= William H. Hodgins =

- Born: 1856; Cloughjordan, County Tipperary, Ireland
- Died: October 17, 1912 (aged 56); Bronx, New York, United States
- Other names: Big Bill Hodgins
- Occupation: Police captain
- Known for: NYPD police captain responsible for the breakup of the Eastman and Humpty Jackson gangs; involved in negotiations to end the Tong wars between the Four Brothers, Hip Sing and On Leong Tongs.
- Children: 2 daughters, 3 sons
- Parent(s): William R. Hodgins, Georgina Hodgins (nee Smith)

William H. "Big Bill" Hodgins (1856 – October 17, 1912) was an American law enforcement officer and police captain in the New York City Police Department. He is credited for the breaking up numerous street gangs, most notably the Eastman and Humpty Jackson gangs at the start of the 20th century. He was also involved in the initial negotiations, along with a number of prominent Chinese-American merchants, which eventually ended the Tong wars between the Four Brothers, Hip Sing and On Leong Tongs.

== Biography ==
Born in Ireland in 1856, William H. Hodgins emigrated to America with his father and nine siblings in 1877 and settled in Kansas. On the death of his father in 1880 he returned to Ireland and was evicted from his father's farm near Cloughjordan, County Tipperary in 1881. Hodgins was an active member of the Land League in Cloughjordan.

After the eviction he emigrated to America again, this time settling in New York. Joining the NYPD in 1888, he was eventually appointed commander of the Tenderloin district. He was also the precinct captain of the district when Harry K. Thaw shot and killed architect Stanford White at Madison Square Garden in 1906.

In 1907, Hodgins was ordered into retirement by Police Commissioner Theodore A. Bingham on the grounds that he was "too fat". As part of his examination, he was made to run around a table forty times. Hodgins would spend the next two years trying to get reinstated and finally succeeded in doing so when Supreme Court Justice Josiah Taylor Marean overruled the police commissioner's order. Hodgins later sued Bingham for $100,000 because his application for police inspector was endorsed "His record poor. He has not the qualifications to command; stupid".

Upon his return to the force, Hodgins was assigned to the Elizabeth Street Station in Chinatown in the midst of the ongoing Tong wars between the Four Brothers, Hip Sing and On Leong Tongs. Hodgins and leaders of the Chinese-American community were able to begin negotiations toward a truce which would eventually lead to an agreement to end the war.

Hodgins left Chinatown and was given command of the Bronx Park police station. He remained precinct captain until his death at his Tremont Avenue home on the evening of October 17, 1912. His wife, two daughters and three sons were all present at the time of his death.
