= David Thai =

Vietnamese-born American gangster

- NYPD mugshot of Thai at the time of his arrest
- Born: Thái Hoàng Thọ; January 30, 1956 (age 70); Saigon, South Vietnam (now Ho Chi Minh City, Vietnam)
- Other name: Anh Hai (Big Brother)
- Education: 1978: Thai briefly attended New York University
- Occupations: Crime boss, gangster, counterfeiter
- Known for: Leader of Born to Kill
- Notable work: As a young teenager on the streets of Saigon, when he wasn't in school, Thái often acted as a mediator between the American G.I.s stationed in Saigon who were in search of drugs, and the Bình Xuyên, an independent military group during the time of the Vietnam War that was also responsible for funding and orchestrating many illegal activities in Saigon during the war.
- Status: Incarcerated at FMC Devens
- Convictions: Conspiracy to commit murder, murder, attempted murder, robbery, racketeering, extortion
- Penalty: 2 consecutive life sentences + 43 years

David Thai (born Thái Hoàng Thọ on January 30, 1956) is a Vietnamese-American gangster. He was the founder and leader of the notorious Born to Kill gang during the late 1980s and early 1990s. He was also responsible for running a massive illegal counterfeit watch operation and at his peak controlled the market and distribution of counterfeit watches in New York by means of "blackmail and extortion." He was the official leader of "New York Vietnamese Born to Kill" from 1988 until his arrest in 1991, which was the combination of months of investigation by the United States Bureau of Alcohol, Tobacco, Firearms and Explosives (ATF) in conjunction with the aid of a former gang member who defected from the gang and became an undercover informant, helping secure the convictions of David Thai and several of his high-ranking officers.

Described as a sly, shrewd and lethal gangster, David Thai fashioned himself as a big brother and the protector to the Vietnamese community in Chinatown. Thai was described by crime writer T. J. English and many others as being well dressed, usually wearing "a tailored sports coat, silk shirt and loft leather loafers" alongside a pair of sunglasses, and was said to have resembled more a businessman than a gangster. During his interview with Peg Tyre after his arrest on murder charges in 1991 and other interviews that went on in the course of his trial, Thai often stated that he was trying to protect and help the Vietnamese community in Chinatown, often by giving the newly arrived refugees money and a place to live. In his interview with Tyre, Thai went on to describe that he sacrificed his first marriage due to his "love for his Vietnamese brothers".

On October 23, 1992, a United States federal judge in Brooklyn sentenced Thai to life in prison for murder, attempted murder, conspiracy, robbery, extortion, and related offenses. Federal prosecutors claimed that David Thai's life sentence significantly impaired Asian gang activity in New York.

== Early life ==
David Thai was born Thái Thọ Hoàng on January 30, 1956, in Saigon, South Vietnam, where his family lived in a home on Tôn Đản street. As a young teenager on the streets of Saigon, when he wasn't in school, Hoàng often acted as a mediator between the American G.I.s stationed in Saigon who were in search of drugs, and the Bình Xuyên, an independent military group during the time of the Vietnam War that was also responsible for funding and orchestrating many illegal activities in Saigon during the war. When Saigon fell at the end of the Vietnam War, Hoàng's father Dieu was jailed by the triumphant communists and sent into a reeducation camp, but Dieu was still able to secure Hoàng's passage out of Saigon, where he thereafter arrived in the U.S. three months later, going by the name David. Initially living in a small house for boys owned by a local Lutheran church in Indiana, in May 1976, David fled from the church house with $150 in his pocket and hopped onto a Greyhound bus destined for New York City.

=== Life in New York and criminal beginnings ===
As a young lost youth in New York, Thai was able to survive in the city by bouncing from job to job, and by various accounts, worked as a busboy in Manhattan restaurants, and was also at one point a dishwasher for the famous Rainbow Room restaurant, located at the sixty-fifth floor of the RCA Building in New York. In his spare time when he wasn't working, Thai began to dabble into the makings of counterfeit watches by constructing a small counterfeit watch factory in his apartment, an industry that he would later come to dominate a decade later.

In 1978, Thai briefly attended New York University, whereupon he met a fellow Vietnamese refugee from Da Nang who was also a student at the university. The two quickly married, and within months, Thai's wife became pregnant. Afterwards, both of them dropped out of attendance from the university and moved into a cramped apartment in Hell's Kitchen. Struggling to provide for his family with his jobs as a busboy and dishwasher however, Thai began making regular trips to Canal Street to delve into financial possibilities, and in 1983, Thai became a member of the Flying Dragons, one of the largest gangs in Chinatown at the time.

Because he was Vietnamese however, Thai and a handful of other Vietnamese members in the gang were cut off from the main gang's lucrative activities, and were forced to form their own sub-group known as the Vietnamese Flying Dragons, whom the Flying Dragons regularly employed to commit the riskiest and most dangerous crimes, since they viewed the Vietnamese as mainly "coffee boys". Seeing no future or further possibilities of advancing himself within the gang, Thai left the Flying Dragons sometime between 1986 and 1987 and began to solidify his control over the counterfeit watch industry in Chinatown, whereupon his profits quickly grew.

At around the same time Thai was establishing himself in Chinatown's underworld, many Vietnamese youths had begun arriving into the city; the majority of them were boat people who were severed from their families and cast adrift at sea prior to arriving in New York. Upon arrival, however, many of these newly arrived Vietnamese refugees struggled to survive in Manhattan Chinatown, mostly because the majority of the social services in Chinatown as well as the banks catered only to the Chinese, where only Mandarin or Cantonese dialects were spoken, thus forming a language barrier. In addition, due to the absence of previous generations of Vietnamese in New York City, there were no residential places where Vietnamese passed on living areas or apartments from one generation to the next, causing the newly arrived refugees, who could not afford to pay for an apartment on their own, to live on the streets.

As Thai's successful watch business continued to grow, his name became well known throughout the back alleys, pool halls and skating rinks throughout New York that many Vietnamese commonly visited. Hearing stories of a wealthy successful businessman who could take care of his own, many Vietnamese youths began approaching Thai and asked for his assistance, which he usually freely obliged to by giving them money, advice, and at times, a place to live. Eventually, Thai was able to build a small gathering of young Vietnamese men around him, whom he often employed as muscle-men to extort from local shop keepers and merchants on Canal Street, or as assemblers of counterfeit watches in safe houses as part of Thai's growing counterfeit watch business. Before long, Thai and his group began to organize and collectively call themselves the "Canal Street Boys". Eventually, however, the name "Born to Kill", a slogan that had originated from the helmets of American GIs from the Vietnam War was gradually used in favor of "Canal Street Boys", and it would eventually become the gang's official name that news media and state police would come to know them by.

== The "Born to Kill" gang ==
=== Formation ===
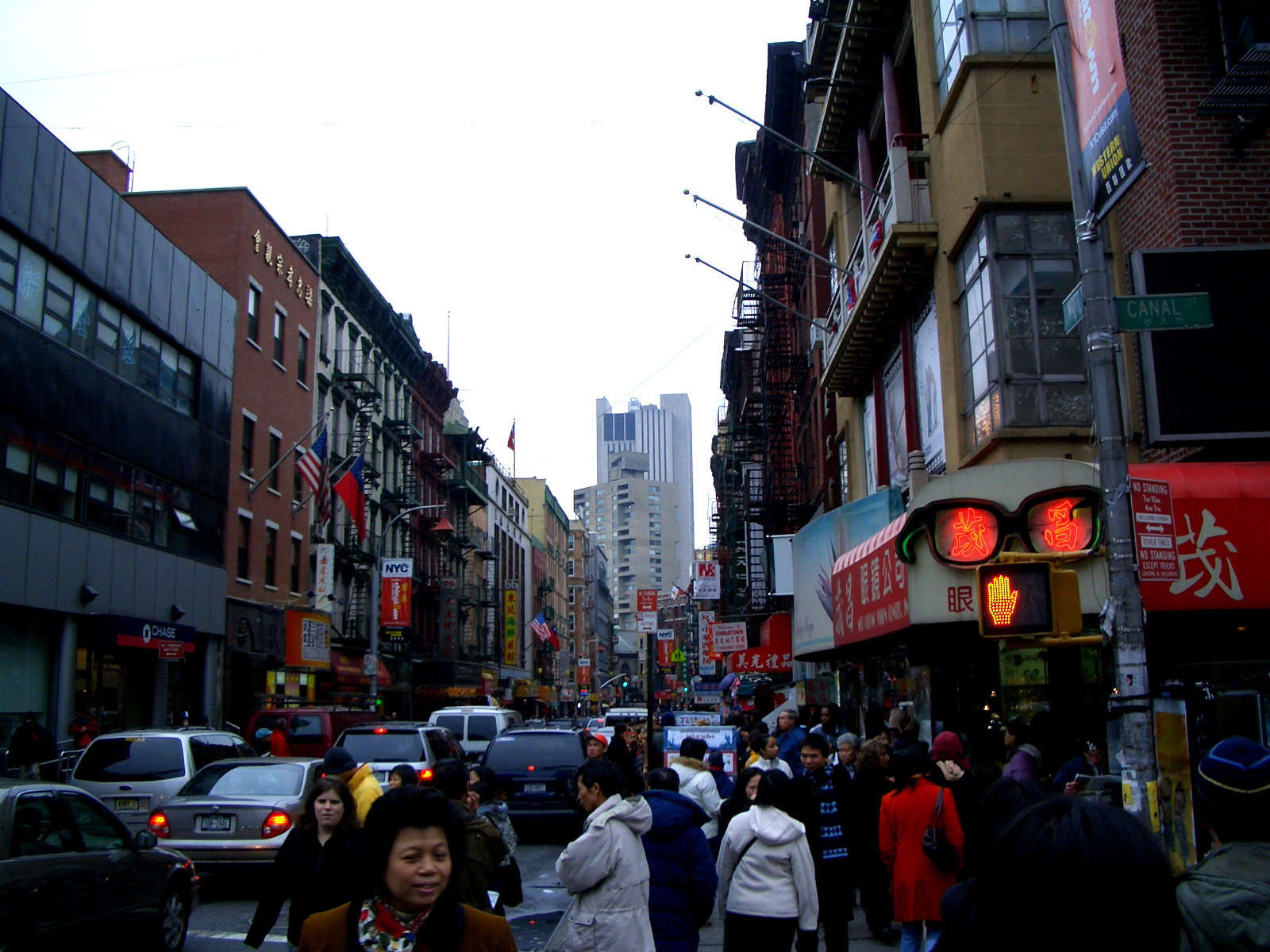
Image of Modern Day Canal Street, the location of the Born to Kill gang's former territory

In June 1989, in a Japanese restaurant in Manhattan, David Thai orchestrated the first major gathering of the Born to Kill gang, in which nearly every gang member attended. At the time, the Born to Kill gang and many of the Vietnamese gangs in New York were in general small unconnected groups that each had their own designated gang name and were only loosely affiliated with one another. During this meeting however, Thai made it strictly clear that all of the many separate Vietnamese factions within the city would go under a single name and banner: Born to Kill, which would override any other name that any of the smaller groups had chosen for themselves. As a result, instead of being a loose confederation of loosely associated gangs, Born to Kill and the Vietnamese gangs in the city coalesced into a single criminal organization that from then on acted under a united hierarchical leadership system, with Thai as the head or the Anh hai of the newly established collective.

In the course of the meeting, Thai had forced all of the gang members who wished to join the gang to sign a paper contract that was passed from table to table throughout the meeting. The contract mainly emphasized the point that gang members had to swear allegiance to the gang, to never cooperate with police, and most importantly, according to Thai, to never undertake criminal action without the permission of the local gang underboss. Thai did however, according to the contract, permit gang members to leave the gang, but only under the condition that they scrape their BTK tattoos off their skin and leave the vicinity of New York altogether and never return.

=== Counterfeit watches ===
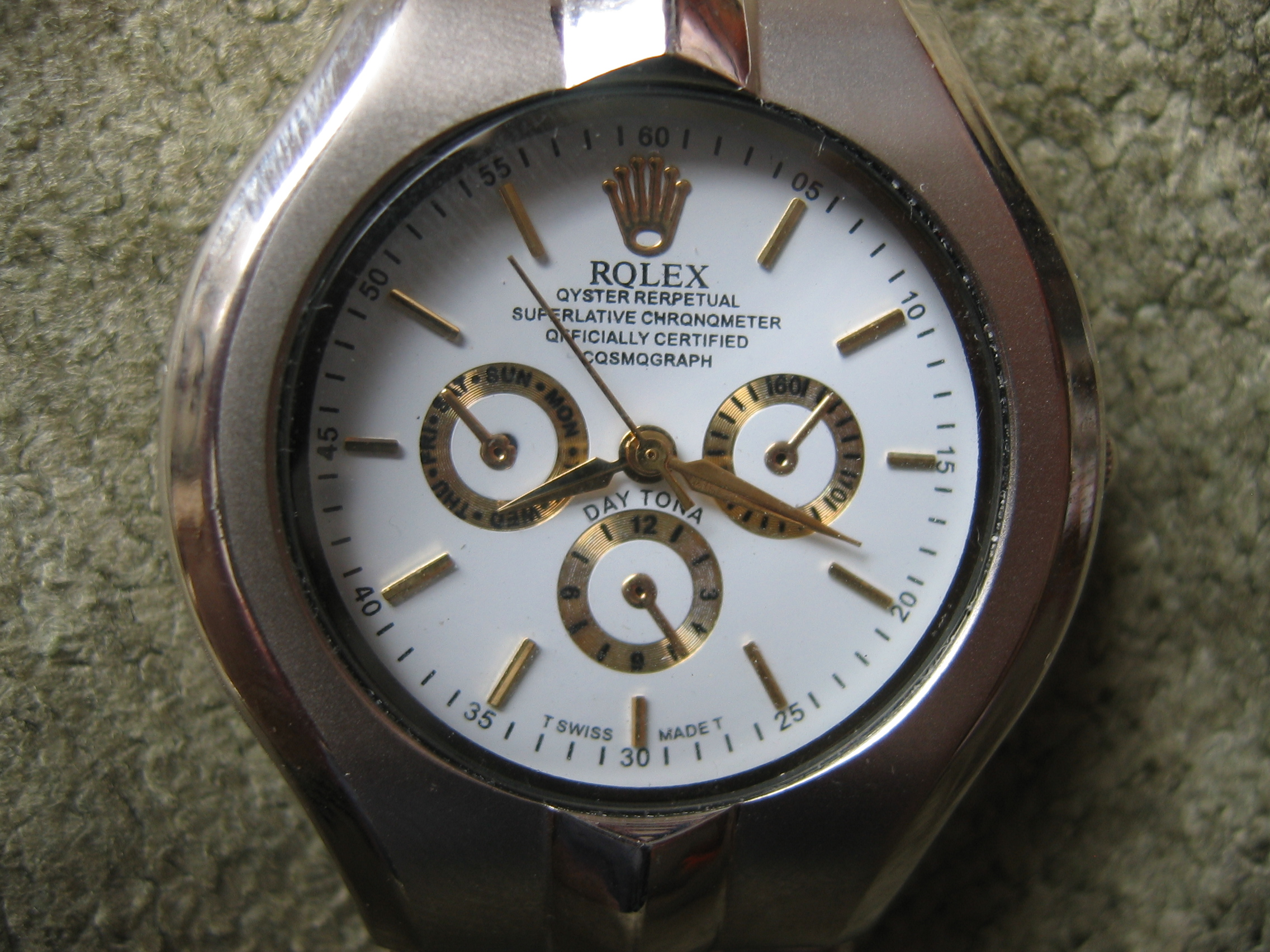
A counterfeit Rolex watch bought in New York City

Thai's most lucrative source of income was the sale of fake Rolex and Cartier watches, an industry that he had spent several years trying to monopolize. Thai's primary method of forcing local merchants and shopkeepers in Canal Street to buy his watches was simple; as the leader of a violent band of criminals, Thai didn't need to be subtle: "Buy my watches or I'll kill you." On other occasions, David sometimes went out on his own to present himself as a conciliator between the local merchants and his own gang, claiming that he could stop the Vietnamese youths from extorting and robbing their businesses, but only if they purchased his merchandise.

In 1988, as Thai's profits grew, New York police became increasingly aware of Thai's illegal watch business; they raided his Canal Street store on multiple occasions. In response, on one instance, when police gathered in front of Thai's store on Canal Street, Thai ordered his members to shower the police with firecrackers from the top of the building. After several successive police raids however, which Thai claimed to have cost him $100,000, Thai decided to order one of his gang members to blow up a police vehicle. The explosion severely damaged the unattended police vehicle and wounded two officers while eleven bystanders suffered minor injuries. In another instance, when Thai's illegal counterfeit watch business came under the watchful eye of a private investigator named Leech, Thai was rumored to have put up a contract on Leech's life.

In 1989, Thai was charged with criminal possession of forgery devices, being accused of possessing 41 printing stamps which he allegedly used to alter 2,000 wristwatches by falsely imprinting them with brand names such as Rolex and Cartier. Thai's defense moved to dismiss the charges, contending the mere fact that he was in possession of forgery devices failed to prove that he acted with the intent to defraud. Thai's motion to dismiss the charges, however, was denied.

When Thai was finally arrested on murder charges alongside several other indictments, he boasted on the TV program 48 Hours that he made $13 million from the sale of counterfeit watches in 1988 alone.

=== Double Homicide on Canal Street ===
On the afternoon of August 5, 1989, as Thai was standing in front of the shopping mall at the middle of the gang's territory on Canal Street alongside a few of his associates, two members of the Flying Dragons approached Thai and began insulting Thai and the gang. The conflict escalated when one of the Flying Dragons members spat on the sidewalk of Canal Street, a signal of disrespect towards Thai and the entire BTK. In response, Thai went to the back of the Asian Shopping Mall and into the Pho Hanoi restaurant cellar where he then retrieved two hand guns that he then proceeded to hand to two nearby BTK members, telling them to "Go shoot those motherfuckers." One of the two BTK members that was given the gun then ran to the front of the shopping mall where the two Flying Dragons had insulted Thai, and in broad daylight on Canal Street, pulled out his .38 caliber pistol and shot dead the two Flying Dragon members, with one of them being shot in the side of the head, while the other was shot through the lung and aorta. Afterwards, the store owners around Canal Street began closing down their stores. Despite the double murder being witnessed by several of the shopkeepers, when law enforcement came, none of them admitted to witnessing it, due to fear of retaliation from the BTK.

=== Conflict with the Hip Sing Tong ===
United under the leadership of Thai, the BTK brazenly committed crimes and robberies whenever and wherever they wanted, because according to Thai, since Chinatown's traditional power structure did not include the Vietnamese, the Vietnamese were therefore not bounded by the rules and laws of the community. The gang had also, as a result of this belief, not sworn allegiance to any particular Tongs or the Triad, unlike many of their contemporary gangs, and as such, frenziedly robbed from establishments that were under control of other Chinatown crime syndicates; on one occasion, a group of six gang members robbed from a gambling den at 1 Catherine Street, in which they stripped several of the customers (including some Tong leaders) in the basement of the gambling den of their cash, jewelry, and credit cards.

Sometime in the summer of 1990, Thai was personally requested to attend a meeting by Kai Sui "Benny" Ong, the adviser-for-life of the Hip Sing Tong, otherwise known to the Chinatown community as the Godfather of Chinatown or Chut Suk, which translates to "Uncle Seven". Hearing of the instability of the Chinatown criminal infrastructure caused directly as a result of the BTK's recent activities, Benny Ong demanded a kong su, an underworld slang for negotiation with Thai, in order to discuss the matter. Presumably, had the meeting taken place, Benny Ong would have offered Thai the ability to hold onto his rackets and control of Canal Street in exchange of giving up the reins over his gang brothers. Though many in the Chinese community felt that Thai should've felt honored to attend a meeting with Uncle Seven, Thai did not respond to Ong's request for a meeting or negotiation. In retaliation, Thai's right-hand man at that point, Vinh Vu, was gunned down at a street corner at 1:00 AM when Vinh and his companion were waiting for a taxi to pick them up from a massage parlor.

==== Funeral of Vinh Vu ====
Vinh Vu's funeral procession took place on July 28, 1990, and lasted over the span of two days in which it was attended by between a hundred-and-twenty-five to nearly two hundred mourners. The funeral service was directed by the Wah Wing Sang Funeral home; the owner of the funeral home claimed that the funeral service was paid by men who did not identify themselves. From the Wah Wing Sang Funeral Home, six pallbearers carried Vinh Vu's coffin accompanied by a crowd of Born to Kill gang members who marched down through the heart of Chinatown, from Mulberry to Bayard Street as some of the gang members paraded openly down Mulberry and Bayard street with the BTK gang banner, which was later folded after a quick scuffle between some of the policemen and gang members in the middle of an intersection.

After the entourage made their way around seven or eight of the densest blocks in Chinatown, they abruptly stopped at Canal Street, the main commercial boulevard of Chinatown, where they then loaded Vinh Vu's coffin into a waiting hearse, with the mourners piling into twenty nearby limousines. The entourage then continued towards Holland Tunnel before eventually arriving at the Rosedale Memorial Park Cemetery. At around 2:30 PM, as the mourners gathered around Vinh Vu's casket, which was adorned with the same gang banner that was marched down Mulberry Street during the funeral procession, two or three men, who were dressed just like the mourners approached the crowd and opened fire, wounding five of the mourners and causing the rest to attempt to flee the cemetery in a panic, with a few of the mourners returning fire back at the gunmen. Afterwards, according to the police, the gunmen reportedly escaped from the scene in a red car. The shooting at the cemetery would be widely recorded and subject by the local news media and national press, which mainly focused on the mourners themselves since the identities of the perpetrators were unknown at the time. Knowledgeable law enforcement and outside observers in the community felt that the shooting was orchestrated by Uncle Seven in retaliation for Thai's refusal to participate in negotiations, while Thai believed that the actual shooting was done by members of the Ghost Shadows.

=== Extortion and murder of Sen Van Ta ===
In early 1991, Thai decided that the gang should rob the Golden Star Jewelry store, a store owned by Sen Van Ta located at 302 Canal Street, primarily because Sen Van Ta had recently been refusing to pay extortion money to the gang and because of the close proximity of his store to Thai's massage parlor. On January 21, 1991, several gang members arrived at the store in two separate carloads, where they forced the store employees onto the ground, stole the money and jewelry from the store and beat down some of the employees before fleeing from the scene in a Cadillac. Although the Cadillac was shortly thereafter pursued by police, who then arrested the four gang members in the Cadillac, another gang member, who had not fled the scene using the Cadillac was able to meet up with Thai and deliver him most of the jewelry from the robbery.

Shortly after the robberies, Sen Van Ta cooperated with police and identified several of the perpetrators in a line up. In response, Thai took a series of actions in an attempt to prevent Sen Van Ta from testifying; first, Thai spoke to Ta in person along with several of the employees, in which afterwards he then told his gang members that he had convinced the witnesses not to testify. In another incident, Ta received an anonymous letter containing broken glass and a newspaper article about the robbery, which was a concealed threat that meant the gang might blow up his store. Finally, Thai again approached Ta in person one morning as Ta was starting to open up his store, where Thai heeded Ta to not open his store and instead go to court to say that the four arrested gang members were not the robbers. Ta ignored Thai's orders and opened the store.

In February 1991, as the BTK began their routine of collecting money from merchants alongside Canal Street, the gang members eventually arrived in Ta's store and demanded that he make payments to the gang. Sen Van Ta continued his refusal to pay the gang, and began reporting these extortion attempts to the police, where he then identified one of Thai's lieutenants along with two other gang members to law enforcement, who then promptly arrested them; they were later released.

After Ta's repeated refusal to pay extortion money to the gang, combined with Ta's cooperation with law enforcement that ended with the arrest of several gang members, Thai decided to hold a meeting with several ranking members of the gang where he declared, "This store owner have to be taken out," and referred to Ta as "…the one who called the policemen." Eventually, Thai's right-hand man, Lan Tran volunteered to carry the duty of executing Sen Van Ta, which he later carried out on the evening of March 10, 1991. Both Thai and Tran would later be convicted in court for conspiring and murdering Sen Van Ta in 1992.

== Arrest and trial ==
In August 1991, after several months of investigation by a team of ATF agents, and with the critical aid of a former gang member turned undercover informant who, over the span of six months starting from February 1991, leaked inside gang information to the police and wore a wiretap to gang meetings in which he recorded several incriminating conversations, the authorities were able to obtain sufficient evidence to arrest Thai and 10 members of the Born to Kill gang during a raid of Thai's house at Melville, Long Island. During the raid, police discovered that Thai was in possession of several unregistered firearms, multiple explosives, and had a counterfeit watch making factory in his basement.

After Thai's arrest along with much of the gang's leadership, law enforcement investigating the gang were more easily able to secure third party testimony from numerous victims of the gang, such as the many merchants and shopkeepers that had been extorted from and victimized, now that they did not have to fear retaliation from the gang if they did so.

During the course of his trial which spanned the course of three months, Thai denied that he was the leader of Born to Kill, and asserted that such an organization never existed in the first place, instead claiming that the police had misinterpreted his criminal organization for an organization that merely assisted young Vietnamese refugees who didn't have money or a place to live. Thai's lawyer during the trial, Mr. Murphy, portrayed Thai as a hard working refugee who worked as a waiter to sponsor his brother and sister to the U.S. According to Murphy, Thai's biggest crime was "making watches and selling them without a license." Thai's answers and explanations however radically changed by the time that he was interviewed by Peg Tyres, at which point he denied being in New York at all during the time frame when most of the crimes were committed, and instead claimed that, for the last three years, he had been working mostly in Philadelphia where he supposedly worked fixing cars.

At the end of the trial, Thai and several members of his gang were convicted of racketeering. Thai was also convicted on fourteen other counts: one count of conspiracy to commit murder in aid of racketeering, one count of conspiracy to commit assault with a dangerous weapon in aid of racketeering, eight counts of conspiracy to obstruct commerce by robbery or extortion, two counts of possession of an unregistered firearm and two counts of possession of a firearm without serial numbers. Thai was sentenced to life in prison without parole and ordered to pay $413,285 in restitution.

=== Effects of arrest on Thai's plans ===
One of the effects of the successful prosecution of Thai by the ATF was that Thai would never be able to fulfill his long-term plans, such as forging a relationship between his gang and "the Italians", and his plans of eventually making ties with and uniting the Vietnamese underworld in the U.S., with the hopes of one day establishing himself as its supreme commander.

== Public image ==
In October of the same year of his arrest, Thai granted a special interview to Peg Tyre, a reporter for Newsday who had also covered the rise of the BTK during his time as a journalist. During the interview, which Peg Tyre documented under the heading "Suspected Gang Leader Denies Link to BTK," Thai presented himself as a community leader that had been merely trying to provide aid and care for the welfare of his "Vietnamese brothers" because he too had lived the same lives that they had, and he claimed that he had attempted to gain the assistance of the Vietnamese community to help the young refugees that struggled to survive in the city.

Author T. J. English, who had written an entire book devoted to the gang, wrote that "Thai always presented himself publicly as a kindly benefactor", as evidenced by his seeming concern for the welfare of his gang brothers by offering them money and a place to live, and that "He even deluded himself into believing that he was the only powerful person in Chinatown who truly cared about the welfare of his Vietnamese brothers", in spite of the fact that he was "venal and brutal" towards his own gang members and others behind closed doors. As stated in the court trial during Thai's 1994 appeal, gang members that disobeyed orders from their higher ups or members that were suspected to be cooperating with police suffered violent retribution at the hands of Thai and one of his lieutenants.

Detective William Oldham who investigated the BTK wrote that "Thai built the gang by masquerading as a father figure leading a benevolent society designed to take care of lost and vulnerable boys, and to protect all Vietnamese from the much larger Chinese population," but then compares Thai to the manipulative Fagin from Oliver Twist, pointing out the fact that while the gang members within the gang barely made enough to survive from their crimes, Thai himself drove a Jaguar and lived in a nice comfortable house on Long Island.

=== Thai's image among gang members ===
Thai was described by T. J. English as being like a "prince presiding over his chosen people". Due to his seemingly genuine concern for the welfare of his fellow gang brothers, Thai was often seen as a godfather or father figure whom many of the young Vietnamese could turn to in times of trouble, either for advice or financially. As a result, many of the gang members within the gang held Thai in supreme reverence, as in the case of Thai's second-in-command, Lan Tran, who referred to Thai privately in his journal as "a model example of a young Vietnamese man."

Thai was also referred to by gang members as Anh hai, a term of clear acknowledgment of Thai's high level of respect, esteem and status within the gang, as "Anh hai" is a term in Vietnamese that is used to refer to the eldest and traditionally the wisest brother in Vietnamese families. The level of respect and loyalty that gang members had towards Thai was underlined when they used the Vietnamese pronoun em to refer to themselves during conversations with Thai, which is a subservient pronoun in the Vietnamese language.

== Poetry ==
During the first few months of his incarceration, Thai wrote several poems which were published in pamphlets that were placed in and around Vietnamese restaurants and newsstands. In one of his poems titled "Carrying the Vietnamese Blood", which was translated from Vietnamese to English in T. J. English's book Born to Kill, Thai wrote:

Leaving my country, I swore to build a new life….
to create my own soul, my own identity.
Even if my body shall be destroyed,
my blood scattered to every corner of the world,
or jailed in a dark room,
my heart shall not fail to remain free….
How I remember the grudges
which I hold forever inside my heart.
But having Vietnamese blood in my veins,
I learn to smile without shedding a tear.

— Tho Hoang "David" Thai
