= Black Dragons (Chinese-American gang) =

Chinese-American gang

Black Dragons 黑龍幫會
- Founded: 1980
- Founding location: Lincoln Heights, Los Angeles, California, Lodi, California, United States
- Years active: 1980–2003, 2020–Present
- Territory: San Gabriel Valley Lodi, California Stockton, California Indianapolis, Indiana
- Ethnicity: Chinese, Vietnamese, Latino
- Criminal activities: Extortion, counterfeiting, illegal gambling, drug trafficking, murder, assault, robbery, arms trafficking, auto theft, and burglary
- Allies: Wah Ching, Vietnamese Boyz Gang, Oriental Lazy Boyz, Asian Boyz, Hop Sing Tong, United Bamboo Triad, 14k Triad,
- Rivals: Tiny Rascals

The Black Dragons (Chinese: 黑龍; Jyutping: Haak^{1} Lung^{4}) is a Chinese-American criminal organization and street gang that was formed in 1980 by Chinese immigrants in Lincoln Heights, Los Angeles, California. It was started by a group of young men who banded together to protect themselves from other Asian and Latino gangs. The Black Dragons operated in Los Angeles and the San Gabriel Valley for over two decades. At the gang's peak it had over 100 core members. They may sometimes be identified by the color black. During their downfall in 2002, the convicted core members have made peace and united with other Asian rival gangs in prison. Over the years, One Black Dragon "Elmo", ( have made allies with numerous leaders and high ranking members of previous rival organizations, this member's information is from a reliable source. This member is also a member of the Hop Sing Tong, the late leader of Taiwan's United Bamboo Triad, (黃少岑 (Huang Shao-tsen), "Yao Yao") is also his godfather, and has family ties with the Asian Boyz Gang, and relations with the Vietnamese Boyz Gang, Cool Boyz Gang, and Wah Ching Gang.

The gang preyed on the Asian American communities as a source of income and is unique compared to other Asian crime groups as they were involved in both organized and street-level crime. The revenue from organized crime came mainly from extorting brothels, prostitution, money laundering, the distribution of narcotics, and counterfeiting merchandise. At street-level, the gang was involved in a wide range of crimes that included murder, robbery, home invasion and car theft.

The Black Dragon's influence was strong in the San Gabriel Valley, during the mid-1990s until its previous downfall in 2002. After two decades, the gang gained the attention of federal authorities because of their involvement in violent criminal activities. The Federal Bureau of Investigation (FBI) opened a case against the Black Dragons in 1999. The FBI then created the Black Dragon Task force and the three-year investigation dubbed "Operation Back Door" led to the convictions of multiple gang members, stemming from murder, attempted murder, armed robbery, extortion, illegal possession of firearms and Racketeer Influenced and Corrupt Organizations Act (RICO) charges. The gang was taken down in one of the largest gang sweeps of 2002, as federal agents simultaneously raided and arrested 30 of its core members, following up with convictions for over half of them in 2003, including a twenty-four year sentence for each of the top three members of the gang.

The gang had been identified as a top threat with a history of violence by various law enforcement agencies, according to FBI Agent Kerry Smith who headed a West Covina FBI unit that targets Asian criminal enterprise and violent crime. "These guys weren't afraid to commit violence," Smith said.

== See also ==
- Flying Dragons
- Ghost Shadows
- White Tigers
