= Johnny Eng =

Drug trafficker

Johnny Eng Siu-hang
- 約翰尼英兆航
- Johnny Eng mugshot (1980's)
- Born: Johnny Eng Siu-hang c. 1958 (age 67–68); British Hong Kong
- Other names: Onionhead, Machinegun Johnny
- Citizenship: British Dependent Territories citizen
- Occupation: Triad gang leader (Flying Dragons)
- Spouse: Lori Eng (d. 2011)
- Status: released from prison on 8 November 2010
- Convictions: Continuing criminal enterprise; importation of heroin; distribution and possession with intent to distribute heroin; conspiracy to distribute and possess with intent to distribute heroin
- Criminal charges: 17 charges related to Continuing Criminal Enterprise Statute and drug trafficking
- Penalty: 24 years in prison & US$3.5 million fine

Chinese name
- Chinese: 約翰尼英兆航
- Hanyu Pinyin: Yuēhàn ní yīng zhào háng
- Jyutping: joek^{3}hon^{6} nei^{4} jing^{1}siu^{6}hong^{4}

Johnny Eng Siu-hang, a.k.a. Johnny Eng (born ca. 1958) (Chinese: 約翰尼英兆航; Jyutping: joek3hon6 nei4 jing1siu6hong4), also known as Onionhead (Chinese: 蔥頭; Jyutping: cung1 tau4) or Machinegun Johnny, is a Hong Konger former Triad gang leader and international drug trafficker. As the former boss of the Flying Dragons gang, Eng was one of the biggest heroin traffickers in New York City during the late 1980's. He was later sentenced to 24 years in prison after being convicted of importing and distributing over 200 kilograms of uncut "China White" heroin sourced from the Golden Triangle.

== Early life ==
Born in British Hong Kong, a teenaged Johnny Eng Siu-hang emigrated to New York City with his parents in 1971. Eng soon got involved in criminal activity such as demanding extortion money from restaurants in Manhattan's Chinatown, as well as clashing with members of the Genovese crime family operating out of Little Italy. Eng eventually came to the attention of Hip Sing Association leader Benny "Uncle Seven" Ong, and paid him a weekly US$10,000 cut from his criminal revenues. Eng was arrested at least five times in the 1970's on various criminal charges including assault, possession of an automatic firearm and promoting illegal gambling.

== Flying Dragons takeover ==
In March 1983, Eng became the leader of the Flying Dragons after the murder of the current Dragon Head Michael Chen, who was shot 14 times having being lured to the Hip Sing Credit Union office on Pell Street in Manhattan after receiving a late night phone call at his apartment. Authorities believed Chen's murder was the result of an internal power struggle within the Flying Dragons' leadership, with Chen wanting the gang to stick with extortion along with running illegal Pai gow and Fan-Tan clubs while Eng wanted to expand into drug trafficking. Investigating officers also theorized Chen was killed by someone he knew and trusted, as he would not have hastily attended an unexpected meeting in the middle of the night with strangers.

In the run up to his takeover, Eng had ruthlessly moved against any perceived threat to the Flying Dragons territory, and was suspected by the NYPD of personally leading a hit team who launched a late night gun attack in December 1982 against the rival White Tigers and Free Mason gangs at the Golden Star Restaurant on East Broadway, which resulted in 3 deaths and 8 people being rushed to hospital with gunshot wounds. Eng's willingness to use automatic weapons during the incident earned him the nickname "Machine Gun Johnny".

By the mid-1980's, Eng had moved into the heroin trade in the greater New York metropolitan area, importing ultra high purity "China White" heroin originating from Asia's Golden Triangle region and taking advantage of the traditional American Mafia suppliers being substantially weakened by a series of court cases such as the Pizza Connection Trial and the Mafia Commission Trial. A 1988 confidential report issued by the Justice Department called Eng "one of the five major heroin dealers in New York City." Eng was estimated to have personally made millions of dollars in profits from heroin trafficking, and owned a US$800,000 mansion on Staten Island as well as farmland in Pennsylvania. Whilst visiting Hong Kong, he drove a new Mercedes-Benz SL and stayed in luxury apartments he owned in Kornhill and opposite Sha Tin Racecourse, while also frequenting the exclusive members only Clearwater Bay Golf & Country Club. Eng also had a controlling interest in several Hong Kong-based shell companies purportedly involved in maritime cargo and the diamond industry which he used for money laundering.

== Heroin importation system ==
Often seen drinking at the Waldorf Astoria while dressed in expensive suits, Eng's flamboyant spending caught the attention of the Drug Enforcement Administration, who set up a taskforce to investigate his illicit sources of income. Investigations revealed that in the late 1980's Eng imported heroin via several methods, such as employing drug mules flying into John F. Kennedy International Airport from airports in East Asia, with the D.E.A. estimating he smuggled around 66 kilograms of uncut heroin using this method. Eng also organized the importation via container ship of 78 kilograms of heroin hidden inside an industrial soybean sprout washing machine sent from Hong Kong, although it was intercepted by federal agents in Boston before the narcotics could be distributed.

However, the primary method used by Eng involved sending packages via regular postal service from the Far East, supposedly containing food items and boxes of Chinese tea, to various addresses in the New York area. The packages actually contained an average of 7 kilograms of heroin hidden amongst legitimate goods (such as odour masking spices), and the apartment owners were paid US$20,000 in return for receiving each package and then handing them over to Eng's lieutenants. Eng's gang had recruited Chinese Americans with no criminal records, but with substantial illegal gambling debts to Flying Dragons loan sharks, to allow their homes to be used as delivery addresses for the shipments. These same people were later flown to Hong Kong at Eng's expense to secretly deliver hundreds of thousands of US dollars in cash to the local trafficker who was sending the shipments of heroin to America. Authorities later estimated the approximately 84 kilograms of heroin sent via mailed parcels, which Eng paid an average of $25,000 per kilo for in Hong Kong, to be worth more than US$64 million at street dealing level in the United States.

== Drug trafficking conviction ==
In early February 1988, United States Customs Service officers in California intercepted 3 packages of heroin sent by Eng's connections in Hong Kong, and the D.E.A. performed a controlled delivery of one of the parcels to Gwendolyn Chan's apartment in New York, where she was arrested after accepting the delivery. Chan agreed to turn state's evidence against her co-conspirators, which resulted in several other members of Eng's gang being identified and then arrested.

After his heroin importation syndicate was discovered, Eng fled back to Hong Kong in January 1989 using a false British National (Overseas) passport to avoid prosecution, however he was arrested there in August 1989 by Independent Commission Against Corruption during an unrelated investigation. When the I.C.A.C raided Eng's office at the Silvercord complex in Tsim Sha Tsui they discovered US$500,000 in cash along with the details of several local bank accounts containing substantial amounts of Hong Kong dollars. After running his details through their systems, they realised Eng was subject to a Interpol notice and was wanted by American federal authorities, then remanded him in custody. Eng fought extradition for nearly three years, but he was finally brought to the United States in November 1991 to face trial.

Despite being represented by top defense attorney Gerald Shargel, in December 1992 Eng was found guilty of 14 of the 17 criminal charges he was indicted on related to the Continuing Criminal Enterprise Statute along with the importation and distribution of 228 kilograms of heroin, and in March 1993 he was sentenced to 24 years in prison and fined $3,500,000 by Federal District Court judge Reena Raggi. The government also confiscated Eng's 200-acre estate in Newfoundland, Pennsylvania, which was reported to have been used for machine-gun practice by members of the Flying Dragons.

== Aftermath ==
On 8 November 2010, Eng was released from prison and was reported to have promptly moved to the People's Republic of China. On 13 July 2011, Eng's wife, Lori Eng (Chinese: 伍羅美玲), was fatally shot by Flying Dragons member David Chea (Chinese: 謝錦徵) at her apartment in Flushing, Queens, New York. Chea then committed suicide.
