= Folex =

Folex may refer to:

- Counterfeit watch, a portmanteau of "faux" (fake) and the Rolex watch brand
- Methotrexate, by trade name Folex
