= Michael Chen =

Michael Chen may refer to:

- Michael Chen (gangster), Chinese-born American gangster
- Michael Chen Wing Sum, Malaysian politician
- Chen He, also known as Michael Chen, Chinese actor
- Michael Chen (businessman and politician), Panamanian businessman, civic leader, and politician

== See also ==
- Mike Chen, American YouTuber
