= Federal Medical Center, Devens =

United States federal prison in Massachusetts

Coordinates: 42°31′32″N 71°37′16″W

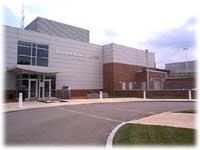
- Interactive map of Federal Medical Center, Devens
- Location: Devens, Town of Harvard, Worcester County, Massachusetts
- Status: Operational
- Security class: Administrative facility (with minimum-security prison camp)
- Population: 1,167 (114 in prison camp)
- Opened: January 1999
- Managed by: Federal Bureau of Prisons
- Warden: F. J. Bowers
- Website: https://www.bop.gov/locations/institutions/dev/

The Federal Medical Center, Devens (FMC Devens) is a United States federal prison in Massachusetts for male inmates requiring specialized or long-term medical or mental health care. It is designated as an administrative facility, which means it has inmates from different security classifications, from white-collar criminals to mobsters and sex offenders. It is operated by the Federal Bureau of Prisons, a division of the United States Department of Justice. FMC Devens also has a satellite camp housing minimum-security male inmates.

FMC Devens is located in north-central Massachusetts, approximately 39 miles (63 km) west of Boston, on the grounds of Fort Devens, which occupied the land before it was scaled back in size.

== Facility and services ==
Upon entering FMC Devens, new inmates undergo a month-long admission and orientation program to meet prison staff, acquaint themselves with the facility, and learn the facility's rules and regulations. They are introduced to the prison's inmate count system: prisoners are checked on five times a day. New inmates also receive a physical exam and educational, vocational, and psychological tests. Inmates at Devens are subject to random, unannounced urine and breathalyzer tests, as well as searches for contraband.

FMC Devens has regular onsite specialists in cardiology, nephrology, endocrinology, surgery, neurology and pulmonology. Inmates often leave the facility, under supervision by officers of Jet Security, to see outside specialists and for tests and medical procedures not available in the medical center, according to Sandra Howard, the clinical director at FMC Devens. There are typically three to six inmates at a time in off-site medical care across civilian hospitals in Massachusetts and southern New Hampshire.

Inmates are allowed six visits a month. Physical contact is allowed so long as it is not deemed excessive. An in-house psychology department offers inmates counseling for depression and suicidal ideation, as well as sex-offender and drug-addiction programs. A chaplain offers religious services and counseling, and volunteers in a prisoner visitation service pay visits to inmates who do not receive many visitors. There are adult continuing-education classes and an electronic library where they can read up on new case law and sentencing guidelines. The prison has a recreation area for floor hockey, basketball, and soccer, a hobby craft room, and a music-practice room.

== Notable inmates ==
=== Current ===
Inmate Name	Register Number	Photo	Status	Details
Danny Heinrich	18854-041		Serving a 20-year sentence; scheduled for release on December 6, 2032.	Kidnapper, child molester, and murderer. Confessed in 2016 to kidnapping and murdering Jacob Wetterling in Minnesota in 1989, but never charged as part of a deal with the police to lead them to Wetterling's body. Sentenced to 20 years in prison for possession of child pornography.
Vittorio "Little Vic" Orena	07540-085		Serving a life sentence.	Former New York City mobster who became the acting boss of the Colombo crime family. Orena is famously known for being the leader of the Orena faction during the Third Colombo War.
Kent Igleheart	71250-019		Serving a 20-year sentence; scheduled for release on October 29, 2034.	Former Roswell, Georgia city councilman. Pleaded guilty to four counts of producing child pornography, one count of receiving child pornography, and one count of possessing child pornography.
Ed Mangano	89707-053		Serving a 12-year sentence; scheduled for release on December 4, 2031.	Former Nassau County Executive; sentenced in 2019 for conspiracy to commit federal program bribery, federal program bribery, conspiracy to commit honest services wire fraud, honest services wire fraud and conspiracy to obstruct justice. Reported to prison in September 2022.
James Ida	43064-054		Serving a life sentence.	Former New York mobster and consigliere for Genovese Crime Family boss Liborio Bellomo; convicted in 1997 of murdering Antonio Dilorenzo and Ralph DeSimone and defrauding charities involved in the Feast of San Gennaro. His application for compassionate release was denied.
David Thai	38263-053		Serving two consecutive life sentences plus concurrent terms of 10 and 20 years.	Born Thái Thọ Hoàng; former New York City crime boss who led the Vietnamese-American gang Born to Kill between 1988 and 1991. In 1992 he and several other Born to Kill members were convicted of racketeering. Thai was also convicted of fourteen other charges: one count of conspiracy to commit murder in aid of racketeering, one count of conspiracy to commit assault with a dangerous weapon in aid of racketeering, eight counts of conspiracy to obstruct commerce by robbery or extortion, two counts of possession of an unregistered firearm and two counts of possession of a firearm without serial numbers.

=== Former ===
Inmate Name	Register Number	Photo	Status	Details
Harold T. Martin III	62332-037		Released from custody on May 24, 2024 after serving 7 years.	Former contractor for the National Security Agency; convicted of one count of willful retention of national defense information.
Richard Goldberg	14321-052		Released from custody on May 24, 2024 after serving 20 years. Currently awaiting trial for child molestation in Long Beach, California.	Serial child molester and FBI Ten Most Wanted Fugitive until his capture in 2007; pleaded guilty in 2007 to producing child pornography, including images of himself engaging in sexual acts with underage girls.
John Franzese	70022-158		Released from custody on June 23, 2017, after serving 8 years.	Former Underboss of the Colombo crime family in New York City; convicted of racketeering conspiracy in 2011 for extorting Manhattan strip clubs; suspected in numerous Mafia-related murders. He was the oldest federal inmate in the United States and the only centenarian in federal custody at the time of his release on June 23, 2017.
Dzhokhar Tsarnaev	95079-038		Transferred to ADX Florence. Sentenced to death on June 24, 2015.	U.S. citizen originally from Kyrgyzstan; convicted of committing the Boston Marathon bombing with his brother Tamerlan Tsarnaev in 2013, which killed 3 people and injured over 200; Tamerlan was subsequently killed in a shootout with police.
John Riggi	12317-016		Released from custody in November 2012 after serving 22 years.	Former Boss of the DeCavalcante crime family in New Jersey; convicted of racketeering in 1990; pleaded guilty to extortion in 1992, and to conspiracy in 2006 in connection with the 1992 murder of acting Boss John D'Amato.
Roger Stockham	75098-012		Released from custody in November 2012 after serving 1 year.	Pleaded guilty but mentally ill in 2012 for plotting to bomb the Islamic Center of America in Dearborn, Michigan, the largest mosque in North America, in 2011.
Daniel Van Pelt	39125-050		Released from custody in December 2013 after serving 41 months.	Member of the New Jersey State Assembly from 2008 to 2009; arrested during Operation Bid Rig in 2009; convicted of bribery in 2010 for accepting $10,000 to provide environmental permits for a development project.
Andrey C. Hicks	21236-055		Released from custody in September 2014.	Found guilty of wire fraud totaling $2,375,204.06; victims include NBA star Kris Humphries.
Rajat Gupta	65892-054		Released from custody in March 2016 after serving 2 years.	Former director of Goldman Sachs; convicted in 2012 of insider trading for sharing inside financial information with hedge fund manager Raj Rajaratnam.
Damion 'D-Roc' Butler	52178-054		Released from custody on September 16, 2008.	Former manager to Biggie Smalls and Lil' Kim. Plead guilty to firing a handgun in a 2001 radio station shootout between Lil' Kim's entourage and rap rivals Capone-N-Noreaga.
Lee Mroszak	71424-053		Released from custody on July 27, 2006.	Lee "Crazy Cabbie" Mroszak was a DJ and former regular guest on The Howard Stern Show. Mroszak was sentenced to one year in prison for tax evasion after "gloating" about not paying his taxes on television.
Raj Rajaratnam	62785-054		Served an 11-year sentence; released in 2021 to home confinement.	Former manager of the now-defunct Galleon Group; convicted in 2011 of conspiracy and fraud for masterminding a $64 million insider trading scheme from 2007 to 2009; the story was featured on the CNBC television program American Greed.
John Gambino	48742-079		Released from custody in September 2006.	Giovanni "John" Gambino was arrested after completing a prison term to be extradited to face drug charges in Italy. He was freed when a federal judge overruled the decision. The judge ruled that Gambino already served a 15-year sentence in the US for drug trafficking and murder and can't be tried again for the same charges in Italy.
Peter Madoff	67118-054		Served a ten-year sentence; released on August 13, 2020.	Brother of Ponzi scheme mastermind Bernard Madoff; pleaded guilty in 2012 to conspiracy to commit securities fraud and falsifying investment records for covering up and distributing funds acquired from the $65 billion scheme.
Anthony Weiner	79112-054		Served 15 months of a 21-month sentence. Released from custody on May 14, 2019.	Former American congressman from New York. Sentenced to 21 months in prison for exchanging sexually explicit text messages with a 15-year-old girl. Released to a New York Residential Reentry Management facility on February 17, 2019.
Kristian Saucier	21868-052		Served a 12-month sentence; released from custody on October 10, 2017.	Former Navy sailor charged with unlawful retention of national defense information and obstruction of justice after photographing classified areas inside a nuclear submarine. Pardoned by President Donald Trump in 2018.
Steven Hoffenberg	35601-054		Served 18 years of a 20-year sentence; released from custody on October 11, 2013.	Former associate of Jeffrey Epstein convicted in 1997 for investment fraud.
Frank LoCascio	36746-053		Died on October 1, 2021 while serving a life sentence.	Former acting Underboss of the Gambino crime family in New York City under Boss John Gotti; convicted of racketeering in 1992 for ordering one murder, and directing criminal activities including illegal gambling, obstruction of justice and tax fraud.
Nicholas Cosmo	49193-053		Transferred to MDC Brooklyn. Serving a 25-year sentence; scheduled for release on November 18, 2030.	Pleaded guilty to fraud for stealing over $365 million from thousands of investors during a 5-year Ponzi scheme; known as the "Mini-Madoff;" Cosmo's story was featured on the CNBC television program American Greed.

== See also ==
- List of United States federal prisons
- Federal Bureau of Prisons
- Incarceration in the United States
