= Michael Chen (gangster) =

American gangster

- NYPD Mugshot of Chen at the time of his arrest
- Born: c. 1950; Guangdong, China
- Died: 13 March 1983 (aged 33); Chinatown, Manhattan, New York City, New York, U.S.
- Cause of death: Gunshot wound
- Other name: The Scientist
- Occupations: Crime Boss, Gangster, Extortionist, Racketeer, Triad member
- Known for: Leader of the Flying Dragons
- Status: Deceased

Michael Chen (c. 1950–March 13, 1983) was a Chinese-American gangster who was leader of the Flying Dragons gang from the late 1970s and early 1980s.

== Early life ==
Michael Chen was born in the Canton region of China in 1950, and the family re-located to British Hong Kong shortly thereafter. During this period, tensions existed in Hong Kong between a corrupt police force, Chinese communist agitators, and the Hong Kong colonial government. This, along with other socio-economic pressures drove Chen's father to emigrate to the United States after Chen was conceived, but before he was born. In 1963, when he was 13 years old, Chen, his mother and his sister left Hong Kong to re-unite with Chen senior in New York City. Chen worked as a delivery boy for a Chinese restaurant in Upper Manhattan while attending Seward Park High School near Chinatown. His father was a taxi driver. He graduated from high school in 1968, and briefly attended college.

== Criminal history ==
In the mid-1970s, Chen became the leader ('Dragon Head') of the Flying Dragons. He was arrested in Queens for homicide in 1976, but the charges were later dismissed. The following year, he was indicted in the slayings of two members of the rival Ghost Shadows during a brazen shoot-out in the crowded Pagoda Theater on East Broadway in Manhattan's Chinatown. However, he was acquitted of these crimes at trial. In a separate incident, he was arrested while carrying 12-gauge shotgun, and had 150 rounds of ammunition hidden in the ceiling of his apartment.

In August 1976, a substantial Federal Grant was awarded to the youths in Harlem to reform children from gang-related activities. In an attempt to swindle money from the same scheme, Chen colluded with Nicky Louie of the Ghost Shadows and Paul Ma of the White Eagles, along with the Tongs, to fake a peace between themselves. The deal, however, fell apart due to the deep animosity between the gang leaders, opposition from the Tongs and reluctance from the lower members of the gangs to maintain a facade of peace. The truce lasted one month until September 10, 1976, when an attack left five people injured.

In 1983, Chen ordered the murder of Chi-ho Lau, who had convinced three members of the Flying Dragons to quit the gang. When the three members changed their minds, Chen would only allow their return if they took out a contract on Lau. On March 5, 1983, Lau was murdered by Tat Li at the Riviera Diner on Astor Place after being shot three times in the back.

== Personality ==
Chen was nicknamed "The Scientist" because of his cool, calm demeanor and patient ways. He had a reputation for being polite and never seemed outrageous or rude; and he was generous toward others especially to his parents and was affectionate toward his grandmother. He did not drink, smoke, or gamble, however, known as a womanizer, he had a weakness for women as well as modern technology. He owned three expensive sports cars and dressed only in designer clothes. Chen thought of himself as a businessman and had invested in nightclubs in Flushing, Queens, a meat market and in a Manhattan paper supply house. Before his death, he allegedly told his friends he was contemplating completely disassociating himself from the gangland of Chinatown and conducting himself as a legitimate businessperson.

== Death ==
On March 13, 1983, Chen was woken in the middle of the night by a phone call, left his apartment located above the Hip Sing Tong Credit Union, and went to a coffee shop adjacent to the credit union. There, he was shot with a handgun fourteen times - four of which went through his eyes. The NYPD Spokesman Sgt. Edwin LeSchack identified Chen's body, which was found at 12:30 pm by an officer of the Hip Sing Association.

Although Michael Chen's murder has never been solved, suspects include renowned Italian mobster Enzo Mangano. Initial speculation by police Captain Robert Larkin was that it was a revenge killing by the Freemasons Gang who accused the Flying Dragons of killing three of their members in a restaurant in Chinatown the previous December. However, after conducting further investigations, police theorized that the killing was carried out by people known to Chen, as he would not have gotten out of bed so late in the night to meet with strangers.

In the early 1980s, a struggle existed amongst the Flying Dragons' leadership with Chen holding the position that the gang should stick to traditional racketeering with the crimes of extortion and gambling. Chen's rival was his underling Johnny "Machine Gun" Eng. Eng wanted to expand into more lucrative crimes such as heroin trafficking. A deeper investigation uncovered that Chen's murder was the result of a power grab by Johnny Eng to take full control of the Flying Dragons. It was speculated since the murder had taken place across the street from the Hip Sing Tong Credit Union, the assassination could not have occurred without the blessing of the Hip Sing Tong leader, Benny Ong. Ong was considered the Godfather of Chinatown and therefore must have sanctioned the murder. Chen's death was a clear message that Johnny Eng was now the new and undisputed leader of the Flying Dragons.

== Murder case reopened ==
On May 8, 1998, Fun Biu Tok was extradited from Los Angeles to New York City to stand trial for Michael Chen's murder. At the time, Fun Biu Tok was a Lieutenant in the Flying Dragons and was instructed to kill Michael Chen by two other gangsters. The reason for the killing was believed to be that Chen was suspected of skimming money from the gang's receipts.
