= Born to Kill (gang) =

Vietnamese criminal gang in New York City

- Founded: 1988
- Founding location: New York City, United States
- Years active: 1988–1992
- Territory: United States
- Ethnicity: Vietnamese
- Membership (est.): peak membership in New York ranged from 75–100, peak numbers outside New York were unknown
- Criminal activities: Drug trafficking, weapon trafficking, counterfeiting, contract killing, extortion, racketeering, prostitution, money laundering, robbery, fraud and murder
- Rivals: Ghost Shadows, Flying Dragons

Born to Kill, also known as BTK or Canal Boys, was a New York City-based street gang composed of first-generation Vietnamese immigrants. They were active in the late 1980s and early 1990s in New York City's Chinatown. The early 1990s proved to be detrimental to the Vietnamese collective following the arrest and prosecution of most of their New York-based operatives by the fall of 1992.

== History ==
The gang that would be known throughout Manhattan Chinatown as Born to Kill was founded by Tho Hoang "David" Thai, who was born in Saigon on January 30, 1956. After the Fall of Saigon, with the help of his father, Dieu Thai, David Thai left Vietnam as a refugee in May 1975, where he then made his way to the U.S. Eventually, David Thai found himself in Lafayette, Indiana, where he lived in a church home for boys. In May 1976, Thai ran away to New York City. There, Thai worked at various different jobs, ranging from being a busboy to being a dishwasher for a Manhattan restaurant, and in 1978, Thai met and married a fellow Vietnamese refugee. Struggling to provide for his new family however, Thai turned to crime, and in 1983, David Thai was consigned as a member of the Vietnamese Flying Dragons, and as a gang member he occasionally committed robberies but was never caught. After a few years, Thai left the Flying Dragons and branched out on his own, establishing a budding multimillion-dollar counterfeit watch business.

During the mid- to late eighties, many Vietnamese youths began arriving in New York City, and many of them, being ostracized by the Chinatown community, were homeless and lived on the fringes of the community. Using his newfound wealth, David Thai began to assist these street youths by freely offering them advice, money and a place to stay, causing many of them to feel indebted to Thai and follow him, forming the beginnings of the gang.

In late 1987, law enforcement had cracked down on and weakened several of Chinatown's established gangs. The previous year, twenty-one members of the Ghost Shadows were arrested on racketeering charges. A few months later, eight members of the United Bamboo gang were arrested on similar charges, weakening Chinatown's traditional gang structure even further. With his watch business in place, Thai seized on the occasion by taking control of Canal Street, which would later become the gang's main base of operations. Using the profits from the watch enterprise, David Thai organized a meeting between him and several high-ranking members of a Vietnamese street gang that called themselves the "Canal Boys", but the gang's name would later be established as "Born to Kill" in 1988. The phrase Born to Kill was adopted from the slogan that U.S. helicopters and soldiers had on their helmets during the Vietnam War.

During the late eighties, as the Born to Kill gang began to attract publicity and notoriety in Manhattan's Chinatown due to their criminal audacity, many smaller groups of organized Vietnamese criminals began to adopt the gang's name. This made Born to Kill a confederation of gangs, which allowed it to expand its criminal operations, exploits and territory into other cities, states, and countries such as Canada. While many of these smaller gangs that had adopted the BTK's name were directly associated with the gang, other groups were not directly affiliated with the BTK, although they were identified as such by the media and some police jurisdictions.

Most of the gang's members were Vietnamese youths who were sent out of their country a few years after the Saigon government had collapsed, in which afterwards they then spent months or years in refugee camps before being put into foster families. These youths then left their foster families and banded together, forming the nucleus of what would become the Born to Kill gang. During the gang's reign of Chinatown from the late eighties and early nineties, the Pho Hanoi restaurant located in the gang's turf on Canal Street served as an informal headquarters and meeting grounds for the gang. The gang's prowess is often attributed to the chaotic environment of guns and drugs in Vietnam. Born to Kill challenged the authority of established Chinatown gangs. While identified by some as predominantly Vietnamese, Born to Kill consisted of New York native Vietnamese as well as immigrants new to the tri-state area. David Thai and his operations birthed the Canal Street counterfeit market and made it a worldwide tourist visit location for bootlegged items.

== Activities ==
Starting out as enforcers for Triads and established Chinese organized crime groups such as Flying Dragons, Born to Kill later organized and distanced itself from the Chinese groups, and was well known to ignore or even challenge the authority of the Triad, as the gang considered themselves as not being a part of the traditional Chinatown criminal structure. During the gang's peak from late eighties to the early nineties, the gang was well known to extort from the approximately seventy shops that were located in and around the gang's turf on Canal Street.

The gang's leader, David Thai, was infamous for operating a multimillion-dollar counterfeit watch business, and he would later go on to claim to have made $13 million from selling counterfeit watches in 1988 alone. David Thai was also known for running a large brothel, where he imported many Southeast Asian women to serve as prostitutes; the brothel was funded mostly by the American mafia, and in exchange, Thai gave the American mafia a cut of the gang's robbery proceeds. Born to Kill had also built up a reputation for robberies, extortion, and murder throughout the city. The gang was also once embroiled in a violent conflict with the Chinese Ghost Shadows over turf of the lucrative activities. To this date they are still regarded as one of the most violent Asian organized crime groups to have ever existed in New York City. Sources have reported that they have moved towards organized crime branching from drug trafficking and murder for hire contracts.

== Peak activity ==
Gang members were predominantly in their teens and 20s, although they ranged from fifteen to thirty-five, and were known to target restaurant owners, storekeepers and merchants along Canal Street. Some members were recruited from areas near the Bronx High School of Science.

In July 1990 there were believed to be as many as 80 active members in New York City and by October 1992, when their activities in Chinatown had diminished significantly, there were still factions of the gang remaining and operating in the state of Georgia and Canada. Peak numbers in New York may have ranged as high as 100, with chapters of the gang operating in New Jersey, California and Texas. Gang members were tattooed with the initials B.T.K, a coffin and three candles, signifying no fear of dying. Born to Kill members were also well known to have fashioned themselves after gangster movies, donning dark sunglasses and black suits along with spiked hair.

=== Outside New York ===
The gang's spread was most prevalent in areas with an established Vietnamese presence, including smaller cities such as Biloxi, Mississippi and larger cities such as Dallas, Texas. Once active in other cities and states, the gang did not always maintain the same activities as they did in New York. In Sacramento, California, Born to Kill was active in less-visible areas such as computer-chip theft, as well as the sale of guns to young Vietnamese.

One of the areas where the gang was most active was Atlanta and Doraville, Georgia where it continued to operate as late as December 1996.

== Decline ==
In August 1991, the gang's founder and leader, David Thai, was arrested along with several other top-tier members of the Born to Kill gang at one of the gang's safe havens in Melville, Long Island. It was believed to have been David Thai's first arrest. This event led to the conviction of seven gang members on federal racketeering charges in April 1992. Most of the gang members were sentenced from between 13 and 60 years, while David Thai and two other members were sentenced to life. After the collapse of the gang's leadership, much of the remaining leaders of the Born to Kill gang that had avoided arrest were believed to have had relocated to the Versailles neighborhood in New Orleans, Louisiana.
