= Continentals (gang) =

- Founded: 1961
- Founding location: New York City
- Years active: 1961-1964
- Territory: Chinatown, Manhattan
- Ethnicity: Chinese
- Membership (est.): 100
- Criminal activities: Vandalism and Assault

The Continentals (Chinese: 大陸幣) were a Chinese American street gang that was prominent in New York City's Chinatown in the early 1960s.

== Origins ==
The Continentals were created in 1961 by ABCs (American Born Chinese) high school students for the purpose of protecting Chinese students from attacks from other ethnic groups, such as Puerto Ricans, Italians and African Americans. One example was when African American Gangs from the Smith Projects where one continental remembers when he used to pass by they would throw dirty diapers out the window and call him Chinaman. The Continentals were the first ABC (American Born Chinese) gang created in Chinatown Manhattan. In the early sixties several "juk tuk" clubs began to appear. Foremost were the Continentals, a bunch who spent a good deal of time looking into the mirror, practicing complex handshakes. The gang got their name from ripping of insignia from Lincoln Continentals cars.

== Criminal history ==
Prior to immigration law in 1965 the only active Chinese street gang were The Continentals. Their crimes were mostly non violent, primarily vandalism as they did not have a reputation of violent crimes, as well as not being founded with a money making purpose.

== Membership ==
The Continentals were a large gang with up to 100 members. After some time they had trouble recruiting new members due to the small number of American-born Chinese, whereas new gangs such as the White Eagles and Chung Ching Yee in California were able to recruit new members who were immigrants from Hong Kong and mainland China.

== Legacy ==
The Continentals will be remembered as members that as a gang that had a nonviolent relationship to the community, compared to later Chinese gangs in New York City. For example, one ex member became a Chinatown social worker who used to be a former continental attempted to negotiate a truce with the Chinatown gangs so they could get a government grant who tried to give up their evil ways and get decent jobs which happened to be a scam to con the Federal government in grant money. The Continentals' inability to integrate with a Tong also diminished its status within the community, contributing to the gang's brief years of activity. They will remembered as having been created to combat other ethnic gangs and racism of their time. In the late sixties with the 1965 immigration law, new gangs began to merge in Chinatown, succeeding the legacy left behind by the Continentals who were known for less violence in comparison to the new gangs that were to come like the Ghost Shadows and Flying Dragons that were significantly more violent and had the principal objective of racketeering.
