= Counterfeit watch =

Unauthorised copy of an authentic watch

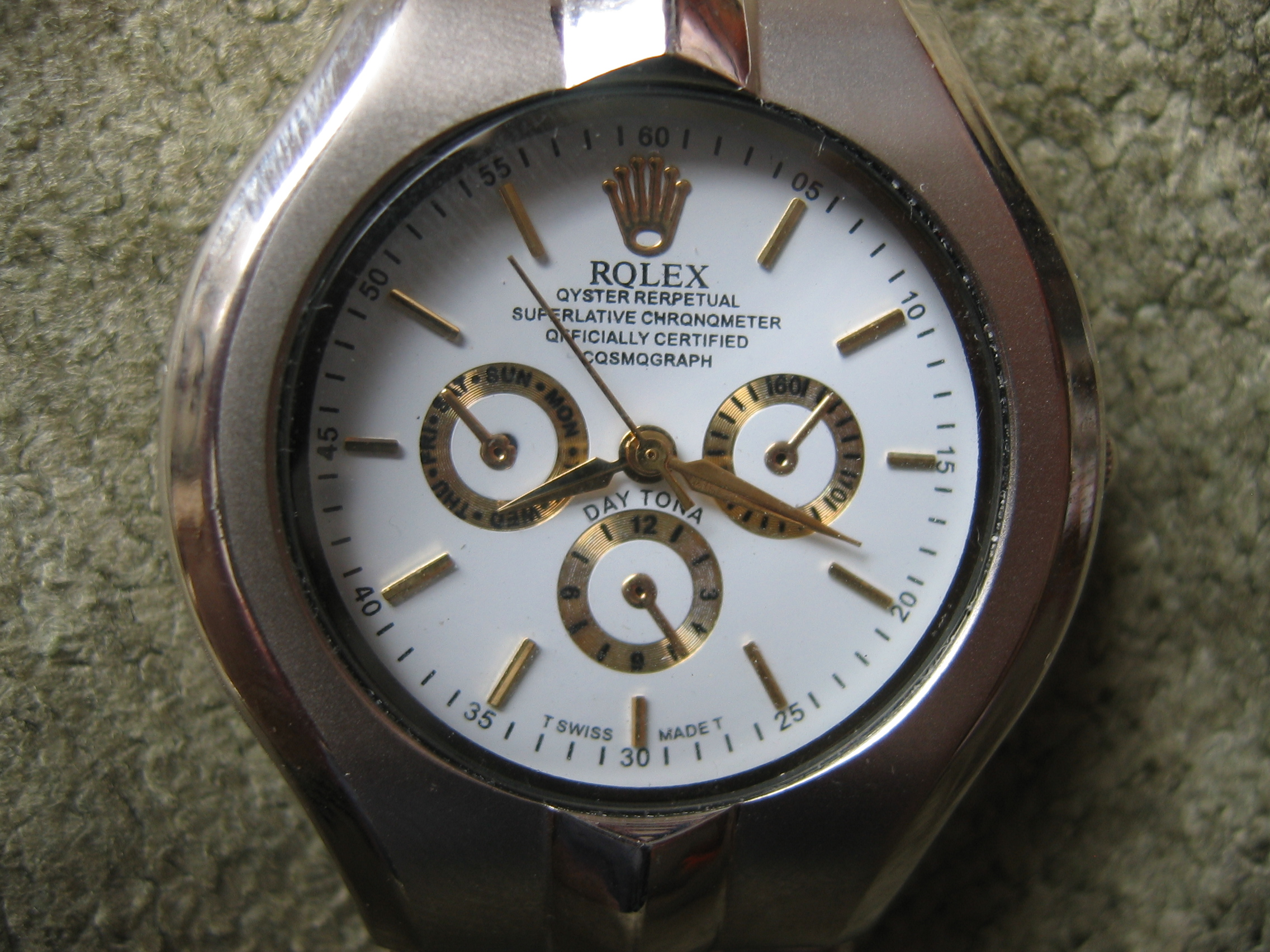
Example of a counterfeit watch; a fake Rolex Daytona bought on the streets in New York City

A counterfeit watch (or replica watch) is an unauthorised copy of an authentic watch. High-end luxury watches such as Rolex, Patek Philippe and Richard Mille are frequently counterfeited and sold on city streets and online. With technological advancements, many non-luxury and inexpensive quartz watches are also commonly counterfeited.

According to estimates by the Swiss Customs Service, there are some 30 to 40 million counterfeit watches put into circulation each year. For example, the number and value of Customs’ seizures rose from CHF 400,000 and 18 seizures in 1995 to CHF 10,300,000 and 572 seizures in 2005. According to a 2012 Federation of Swiss Watches estimate, counterfeit Swiss watch sales generated $1 billion in sales per year.

== History ==
Forgery of watches became a serious problem in the eighteenth century when Britain came to rival France as the leading producer of quality clocks and watches. By the middle of the century, watchmakers in Augsburg (Germany) and in various small towns in French-speaking Switzerland were producing watches falsely signed with the names of well-known English makers such as George Graham and Eardley Norton. Other, less obvious forgeries carried imaginary names with a vaguely English sound, such as 'Samson' or 'Simpton'. In the following century Breguet became a frequent target for forgers; at the same time British makers continued to suffer, many forgeries bearing the name 'M. J. Tobias' – a mistake for a real London maker named Michael Isaac Tobias. In the 1860s, when the American watch industry was gaining strength, the Swiss industry was responsible for many imitations of Waltham watches; these, unlike most of the earlier forgeries, often imitated the appearance of the genuine article quite closely as well as borrowing the names. This practice died out in the early 1870s, as the Swiss could not compete, so surrendered the mass-market field to U.S. firms and focused on branding high end status symbols.

== Modern infringers ==
Replica watches are frequently sold from street stands in districts catering to tourists or Internet websites (mostly Asian). For instance there has been an "open market" for counterfeit watches along Canal Street in Manhattan, New York City for over 20 years. During the 1980s and 1990s, David Thai, the leader of the infamous Born to Kill gang was well known to have run a counterfeit watch operation on Canal Street in which he was able to profit at least $13 million in 1988 alone from the sales of counterfeit Rolex watches.

E-mail spam was a widely used means of advertising to potential customers of replica watches, though e-mail providers have been cracking down in recent years. The auction website eBay was previously known to have many listings for fake watches. Search engines have been increasingly pressured to remove search results of websites that sell fakes. Furthermore, many expensive brands do not sanction any online sales, and instruct customers to only buy watches from authorized retailers.

Swiss Customs estimates that 40% of counterfeit watches come from China, but counterfeits are produced elsewhere, even in the US. EU figures show that at least 54% of fakes seized in 2004 originated in China. The Swiss Customs Service is obliged to confiscate and destroy such goods to prevent re-sale. While there are some exceptions, counterfeit jewelry is confiscated in most cases.

== Types of counterfeits ==
Trademark violations: infringing on the rightfully owned trademarks, hallmarks, symbols and any other distinctive signs of a watch brand, with or without complete trade-dress or design violation. This extends to other false indications and or markings in violation of any law, or official agreement. Typical noted examples would include "Swiss Made", "Water Resistant", "Shock Resistant", false precious metal or any other "noble metal" indications.

Trade-dress or design violations: the second group involves counterfeit watches designed to resemble the original (a trade dress violation). Some high-priced counterfeit watches are produced from inferior materials and have golden parts and leather straps.

Note that designs are extremely difficult to copyright; thus it is legal for watch makers to freely use designs from their competitors. However, all brands have trademarked their name and symbols. Rolex watches have often been more susceptible to counterfeiting compared to other luxury watches, due to their brand enjoying the highest worldwide awareness and ubiquity of their design trademarks (for instance, the Rolex Submariner has inspired plenty of imitations from both higher-end and lower-end legitimate watchmakers). Counterfeit Rolex watches commonly retail anywhere from $5 to upwards of $1,000; the latter for high-end replicas with portions fabricated from solid karat gold, although most gold Rolex fakes utilize gold electroplating. Such watches are known by several nicknames such as Fauxlex.

== Counterfeit characteristics ==
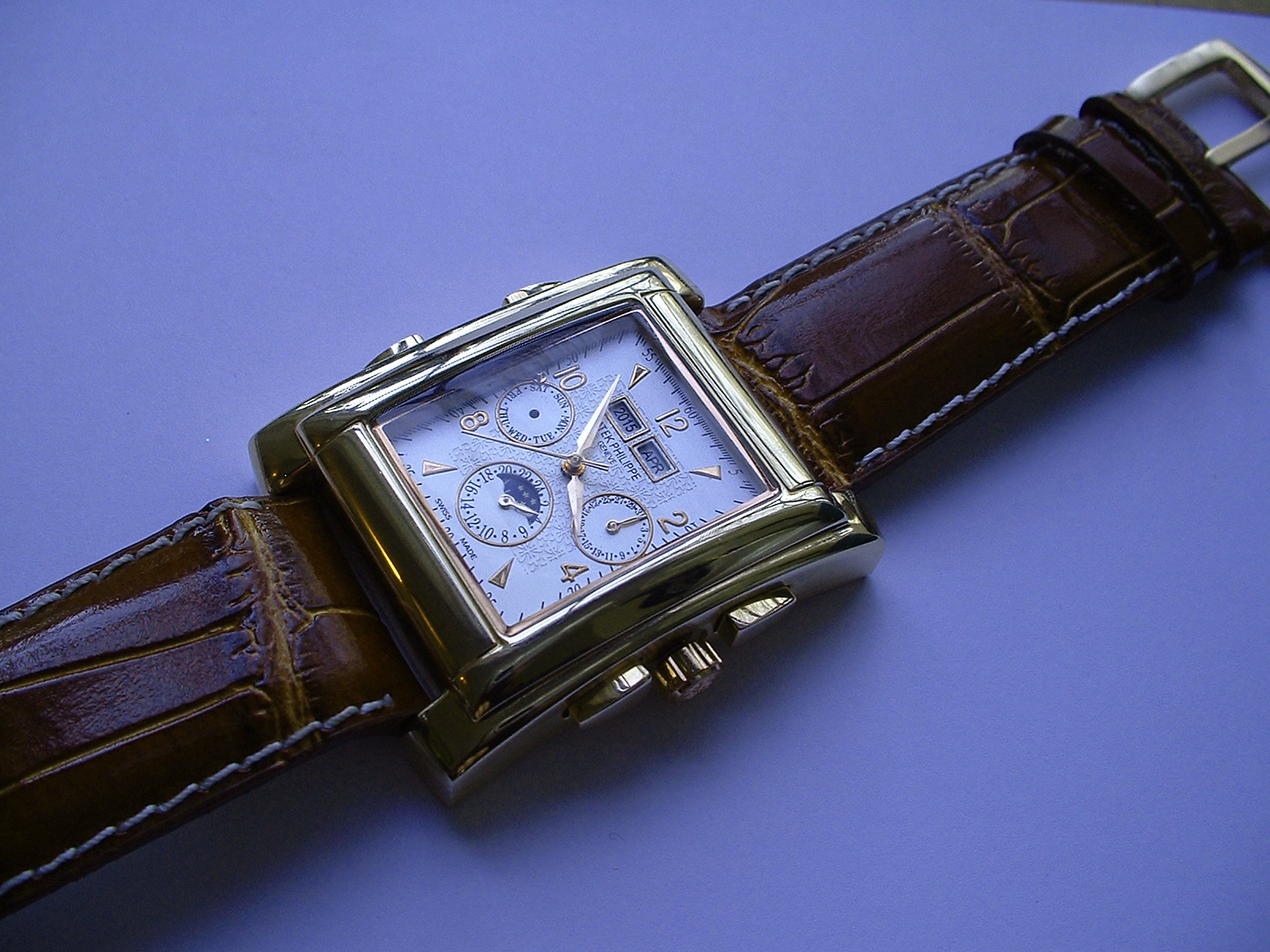
A counterfeit Patek Philippe watch; note the hand on the left sub-dial has fallen off.

A common myth states that a genuine watch can be discerned from a fake by the fluid movement of the sweep hand. This is because many counterfeited watches use inexpensive crystal quartz movements which produces the start/stop once per second sweep. Observed closely, one will see that even a true Rolex movement is not a perfectly smooth sweep, but is actually eight movements per second (or 28,800 per hour) in some models or around 21,000 vph in other models. The only mechanical watches that have a second hand that moves across the dial in a truly uninterrupted sweep are the Seiko Spring Drive series. Nonetheless, some of the counterfeits have automatic movements (genuine or imitation), and Rolex has produced a few models with quartz movements such as the OysterQuartz which produces the distinct quartz movement "ticks".

=== Hallmarks ===
According to the Swiss Customs Service, counterfeit watches can be made in such a manner as to require special equipment to confirm near authenticity. Previously, replica watches could be distinguished by "sloppy printing, soft metal and cheap quartz movements that made the second hand clunk its way round the dial" while recent "fakes feel substantial, keep decent time and have the patina of high quality. Some are so convincing that the only way to tell they're fake is to take the back off".

A high price is not a guarantee of authenticity. Indications of fineness do not necessarily indicate authenticity. Hallmarks can be forged, and may induce a buyer to believe a piece is made of real gold when it may only be made of a cheap metal plated in gold.

=== Frankenwatches ===
High quality replicas are sometimes modified by collectors and amateur horologists with genuine parts, such as movements, dials, hands, and bracelets, and are known as "frankenwatches".

It is possible for a frankenwatch to be made entirely from genuine parts. eBay and other Internet websites have provided the means to buy or sell these parts, which were originally supposed to be after-market spare parts for repair. Some have retrofitted a rare limited-edition dial on a lesser/common version of the same line of watches, and often an original stainless steel watch is disassembled so its dial and movement is placed in an after-market solid gold case. These are difficult to trace, since the watch manufacturer's serial numbers are engraved only in watch case.

=== Counterfeit digital watches ===
Many low-priced digital watches have also been counterfeited in a similar fashion to luxury watches. It is primarily distinguished by its lower build quality than the original and are significantly less accurate. Examples of commonly counterfeited digital watches are popular Casio watch models such as F-91W and various G-Shock models.

== Homage watch ==
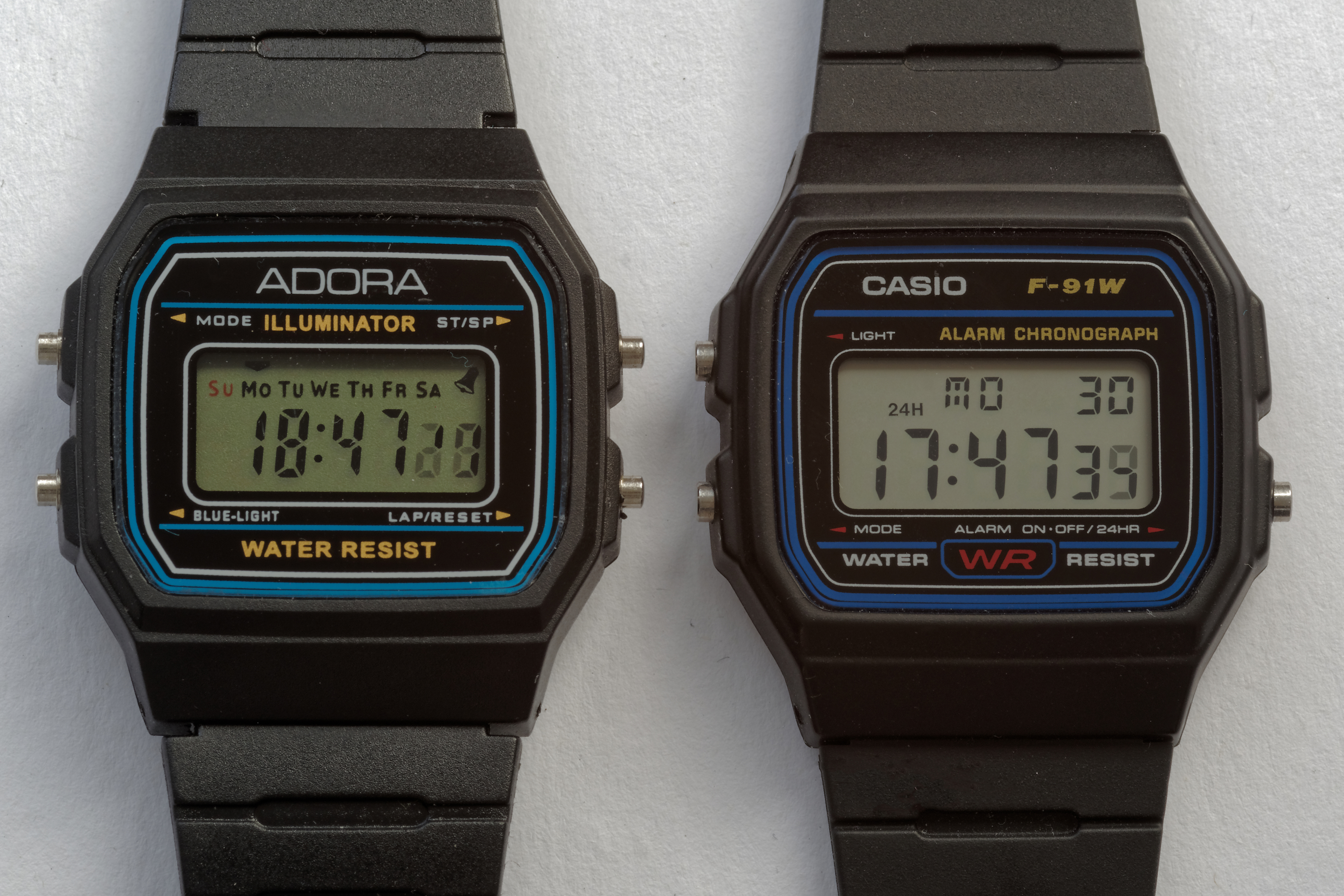
An Adora PWL-19 homage watch beside the original Casio F-91W.

A homage watch is distinct from a counterfeit as it is a totally legal watch, imitating the design characteristics of a well-known watch without directly infringing on its intellectual property. These are timepieces designed to be as similar as possible to iconic watches, and usually of high quality, while avoiding the use of trademarked names, logos or movements. Homages are generally marketed as a more affordable alternative to an equivalent high-end watch of a similar design, though low-end homages have also been produced. Most watch manufacturers offer homage models of varying price tags and designs, and many luxury brands produce watches that are inspired by competitors' designs.

== See also ==
- Watch
- Horology
- List of watch manufacturers
- Timepiece
- Counterfeit
- Replica
- Authentication
- Counterfeit consumer goods
- Watchmaker
- Federation of the Swiss Watch Industry
