= On Leong Chinese Merchants Association =

Chinese-American fraternal organization

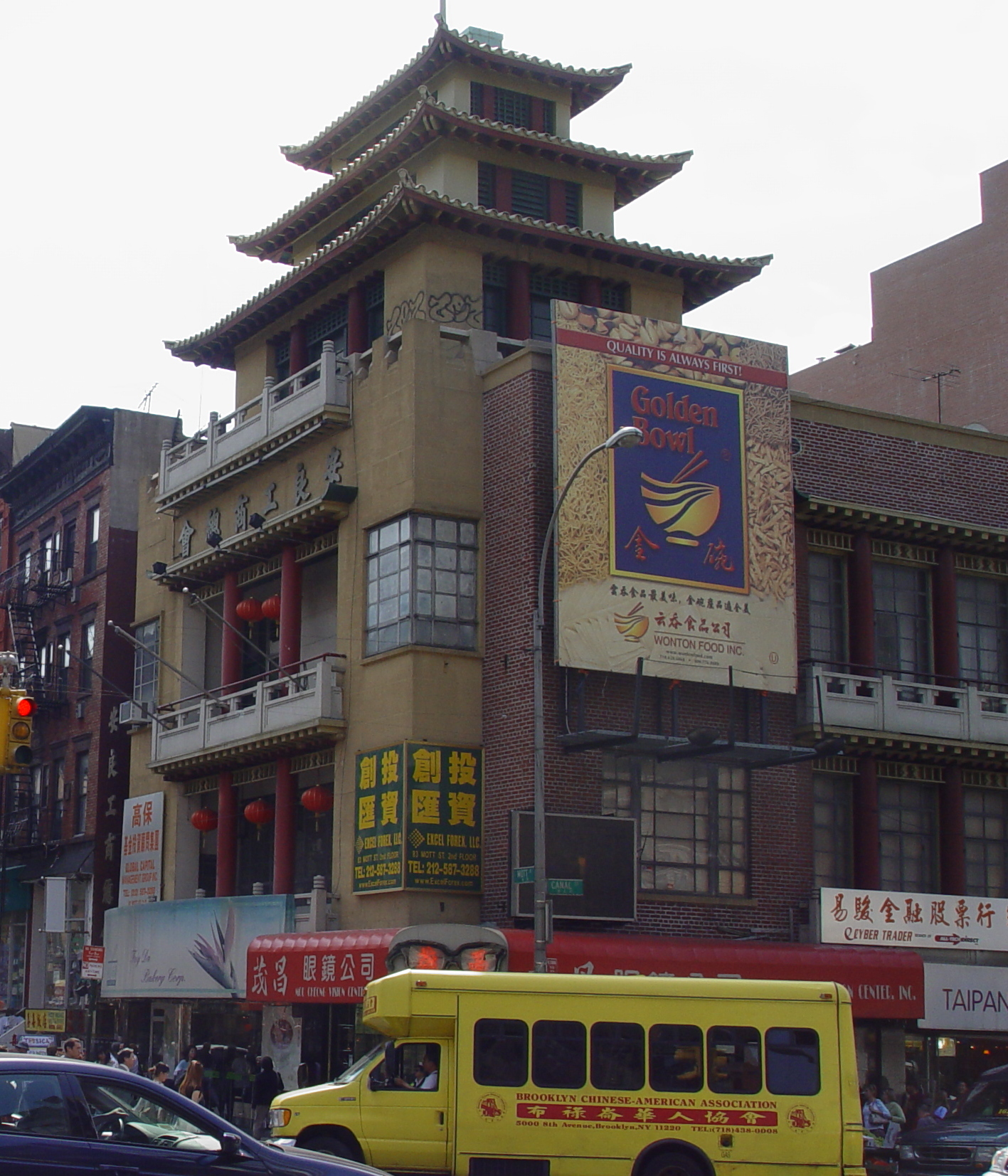
- The landmark On Leong Merchants Association Building in Chinatown, Manhattan (曼哈頓華埠)
- Traditional Chinese: 安良工商會
- Simplified Chinese: 安良工商会
Transcriptions
Standard Mandarin
- Hanyu Pinyin: Ānliáng Gōngshānghuì
Yue: Cantonese
- Yale Romanization: Ōn-lèuhng Gūng-sēung-wúi
- Jyutping: on^{1} loeng^{4} gung^{1} soeng^{1} wui^{2}

On Leong Tong
- Traditional Chinese: 安良堂
- Simplified Chinese: 安良堂
Transcriptions
Standard Mandarin
- Hanyu Pinyin: Ānliángtáng
Yue: Cantonese
- Yale Romanization: Ōn-lèuhng Tòhng
- Jyutping: on^{1} loeng^{4} tong^{4}

The On Leong Chinese Merchants Association, or simply Chinese Merchants Association, formerly known as the On Leong Tong, is a tong society operating out of its territory at the intersection of Canal Street and Mott Street in Chinatown, Manhattan. Established in November 1893, the tong fought a violent war for control of Chinatown's rackets and businesses with the Hip Sing Tong. In recent years, the Tong has been linked to the Ghost Shadows street gang led by Wing Yeung Chan. Currently, there are over 30,000 registered On Leong members, the majority of whom have a commercial or industrial background.

The New York headquarters of the On Leong Chinese Merchants Association was designed by architect Poy Gum Lee.
