= Lee Mroszak =

American radio personality (1968–2024)

Lee Siegfried
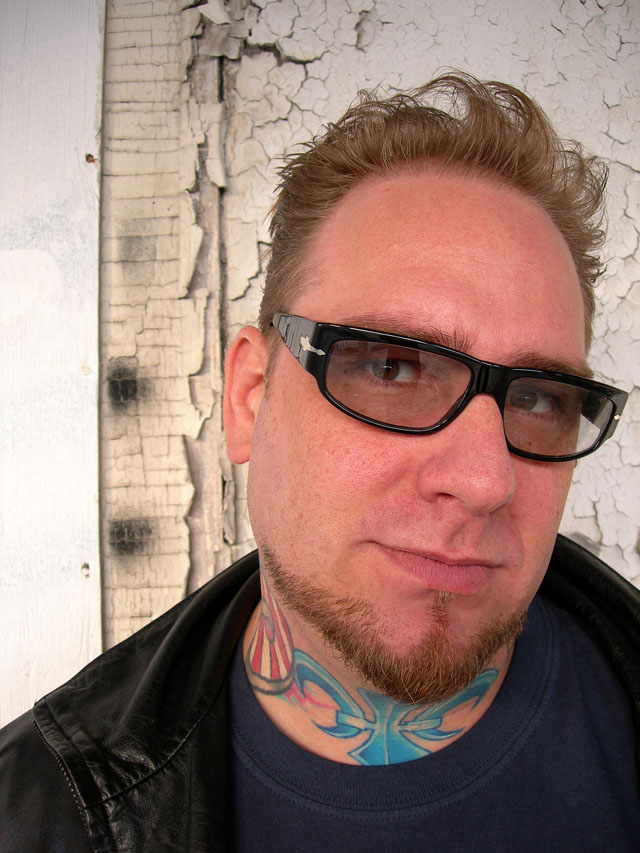
- Siegfried in 2008
- Born: Lee Anthony Mroszak; December 11, 1968; Minnesota, U.S.
- Died: March 30, 2024 (aged 55)
- Other names: Lee Siegfried, Cabbie, Crazy Cabbie
- Occupation: Broadcaster

Lee Siegfried (born Lee Anthony Mroszak, December 11, 1968 – March 30, 2024), known by the on-air moniker Crazy Cabbie, was an American disc jockey. He broadcast on New York City's 92.3 K-Rock for several years as part of the Cane and Cabbie Show and was a regular guest on The Howard Stern Show.

== Early life ==
Lee Mroszak was born to an unwed mother as the product of an affair with a married man in 1968 and quickly given up for adoption. Mroszak left his adopted family at age 13 after years of abuse.

== Minnesota radio career ==
Mroszak began his radio career as a frequent caller known as "Cabbie" on The Andy Savage Show, airing on Minneapolis's 93.7 The Edge. When The Howard Stern Show came to town in 1997, Mroszak moved to the KQRS Morning Show, the highest-rated morning drive show in Minneapolis.

Mroszak raised his visibility at KQRS as a street reporter who took some listeners on a tour of the city's crack cocaine market. In one attempt to be outrageous, Mroszak did a "remote report" in which he claimed to have knocked on NFL star Brett Favre's hotel room door when the NFL's Green Bay Packers were in town for a Monday night game. Mroszak claimed that he intended to offer Favre some Vicodin and a six-pack of beer, but that he instead discovered the quarterback with a naked female who was not his wife. The report ended abruptly, but the press contacted the station for further information. Mroszak was forced into hiding, but eventually admitted that the story was completely fabricated. With his credibility shattered, Mroszak was fired by KQRS and the station apologized to Favre.

== New York radio career and The Howard Stern Show ==
From 1998 to 2004, Mroszak was the co-host of the Cane and Cabbie Show with fellow Minnesota-raised broadcaster Cane Peterson. The show aired in the afternoon drive slot on WXRK FM (or K-Rock) in New York City. During this time, he often interacted with the staff on The Howard Stern Show discussing his service in the 82nd Airborne Division, deployment during the Gulf War, events that occurred during his time at K-Rock radio, and many incidents from his personal life. It was on the Stern show he was reunited with his birth mother.

== Tax trouble ==
Mroszak was arrested for tax evasion after saying on the November 9, 2004 Howard Stern Show that he did not file a tax return in many years and would not resume filing until the U.S. government cured his Gulf War Syndrome. An IRS employee was listening and reported him. Mroszak pleaded guilty to tax evasion in federal court in December 2004, and was sentenced to one year in prison and ordered to pay his outstanding taxes. On July 29, 2005, Mroszak was imprisoned at the Federal Correctional Institution in Fort Dix, New Jersey. On February 27, 2006, it was reported on The Howard Stern Show that he was moved to Federal Medical Center (FMC) Devens in Ayer, Massachusetts. Mroszak was released from prison on July 27, 2006, and appeared on The Howard Stern Show that same day to discuss his prison experiences.

== Illness and death ==
In 2020, it was reported Mroszak suffered from Guillain–Barré syndrome, a rare nerve disorder that can result in paralysis. In 2021 during an interview with Brad Straubinger for the Here's the Pitch podcast, Mroszak disclosed that he could no longer walk, and used a wheelchair but hoped to launch his own podcast.

Mroszak died on March 30, 2024, at the age of 55.
