= Flying Dragons (gang) =

Chinese-American gang

- Founded: 1967; 59 years ago
- Founding location: Chinatown, Manhattan, New York City, New York, United States
- Years active: 1967–1994
- Territory: Chinatown
- Ethnicity: Cantonese and Taishanese
- Membership (est.): 100
- Activities: Drug trafficking, extortion, loansharking, illegal gambling, assault and murder
- Allies: Hip Sing Association
- Rivals: Born to Kill; Ghost Shadows; White Tigers
- Notable members: Michael Chen; Johnny Eng

Flying Dragons
- Traditional Chinese: 飛龍幫
- Simplified Chinese: 飞龙帮
Transcriptions
Standard Mandarin
- Hanyu Pinyin: Fēilóngbāng
Yue: Cantonese
- Yale Romanization: Fēi-lùhng Bōng
- Jyutping: fei^{1} lung^{4} bong^{1}

The Flying Dragons, also known as FDS, was a Chinese American street gang prominent in New York City's Chinatown from the 1970s to the early 1990s. Formed in 1967 by immigrants primarily from Hong Kong, they were affiliated with the Hip Sing Tong. During the 1980s, the gang often engaged in bloody turf wars with the newer Ghost Shadows gang. Their activities included extortion, kidnapping, murder, racketeering, and illegal gambling. The gang moved heavily into heroin trafficking after the Italian-American Mafia lost the trade as a result of the Pizza Connection prosecutions in the mid-1980s.

== Characteristics ==
Similar to the triads of China and the yakuza of Japan, the Flying Dragons were composed primarily of members of a single ethnicity. For a time, in comparison to Western gangs, this allowed organizations such as the Flying Dragons to remain relatively impenetrable by police outside of their homelands.

== Activities ==
The Flying Dragons allegedly maintained significant operations across Chinatowns across in the United States and in British Hong Kong. Much like other Triad gangs, the Flying Dragons ran illegal Pai gow and Fan-Tan clubs while also offering high interest loans to those with illegal gambling debts via loan sharks. In the mid-1980's the gang got heavily involved with the importation and distribution of narcotics, primarily ultra high purity heroin sourced from associates in the Far East. The gang often clashed with rivals, such as a December 1982 gun attack against the White Tigers and the Free Masons at the Golden Star Restaurant on East Broadway, which resulted in 3 deaths and 8 people being rushed to hospital with gunshot wounds.

Flying Dragons leader Johnny Eng, also known as "Onionhead", was charged and convicted in 1992 of masterminding an international heroin importing scheme. Federal prosecutors alleged evidence against Eng including 300 pounds of heroin shipped to New York in stuffed animals, strapped to couriers, and sealed in steel machines used to wash bean sprouts.

In 1994, in what law-enforcement officials called a major blow to the largest and last of the traditional criminal gangs in Chinatown, 33 suspected members of the Flying Dragons were indicted on federal racketeering charges. Sources described these charges as three murders, 12 attempted murders, heroin trafficking, illegal gambling, arson, extortion, and robberies that stretched from Manhattan into Brooklyn and Queens.

== Gang leadership ==
While the Flying Dragons' current leadership is unknown, the most well-known boss of the gang was Johnny "Onionhead" Eng (also known as Machinegun Johnny). His notable tenure as leader is estimated to have lasted from a rise to power in the early 1980s to his incarceration in the 1990s.

Eng is widely believed to have first emigrated from Hong Kong to the United States in the early 1970s, aged around 13. Several sources agree that Eng took over the Flying Dragons in 1983 after the murder of his predecessor Michael Chen in the spring of that year. Nicknamed "The Scientist" for his cool and calm demeanor, Chen was killed in the doorway of the Hip Sing credit union, suffering a total of 14 gunshots, including four rounds fired into his eyes.

== Vietnamese Flying Dragons ==
The Vietnamese Flying Dragons were a former branch of the Flying Dragons gang that consisted of primarily Vietnamese members. One former members, David Thai, a Vietnamese refugee who joined the gang in 1983, decided to leave it in 1987 after being disaffected by the lower status of the members consigned to this particular branch of the gang, who were mostly viewed as "coffee boys" and ordered to carry out those crimes that carried stiff penalties such as robbery and murder, and were excluded from the main gang's more lucrative activities such as drug dealing. David Thai later built his own gang that rivalled the Flying Dragons, called Born to Kill, which began to compete with the Flying Dragons and the Ghost Shadows for control and territory over Chinatown.

== Overseas activities ==
The Flying Dragons have their roots in Hong Kong and historically maintained operations there. They have also been allegedly linked to criminal activities in parts of Canada and Australia.

== Sources ==
- McGarvey, Brendan (August 2002). "Silent Threat: Korean Americans don't talk much about the gangsters in their midst". Philadelphia City Paper. Archived from the original on 21 August 2013.
- Writer, John Pirro, Staff (13 January 2010). "Police tie 2005 Bethel home invasion, rape to violent NYC gang". NewsTimes.
- Chin, Ko-lin (1986). Chinese triad societies, tongs, organized crime, and street gangs in Asia and the United States (Thesis). Archived from the original on September 2, 2006.
- Brunker, Mike (5 April 1997). "Asian gangs are brothers in crime". NBC News. Archived from the original on April 15, 2021.
