= White Tigers (gang) =

New York City Chinese street gang

- Founded: 1980
- Founding location: New York City
- Years active: 1980s–1990s
- Territory: Flushing, Queens, and Chinatown, Manhattan
- Ethnicity: Chinese
- Membership (est.): 10–50
- Leader: Chris Chin
- Criminal activities: Extortion, illegal gambling, racketeering, assault, kidnapping, human trafficking, drug trafficking, arson and murder
- Rivals: Flying Dragons; Green Dragons

The White Tigers (Chinese: 白虎; Jyutping: Baak^{6} Fu^{2}) were a Chinese American street gang that was prominent in New York City's Flushing, Queens, and northern area of Chinatown from the early 1980s to the mid 1990s. They were formed in 1980 by immigrants from China of the ethnicity of Cantonese and Taiwanese, and ABCs (American-born Chinese). They adopted the color white as their clothing to match the name of the set. Throughout the 80s, the gang was often engaged in bloody turf wars with other Queens gangs, such as the younger Green Dragons. Their activities included extortion, kidnapping, illegal gambling, racketeering, drug trafficking, human trafficking, arson and murder.

== Territory ==
In the early 1980s new gangs emerged in the peripheral of other New York City boroughs, such as following the patterns of Chinese immigration. In Queens emerged a Chinese community in Flushing and the White Tigers, were created from this community. As such the gang soon started to prey on residents by robbing and extorting local businesses. The White Tigers did have territory in upper Chinatown in Manhattan, on Mott Street, with permission from the Ghost Shadows, but their territory was primarily in Queens, which considered by specialists as a territory ripe for the picking. With such virgin territory it allowed a new gang like the White Tigers to prosper.

== Membership ==
Sources vary as to the size of the gang. One gang member said it had 10 core members and 20 to 30 peripheral members. Another survey said that, like smaller gangs like the Green Dragons, Taiwan Brotherhood and Golden Star appear to have a maximum of 20 core members and 50 peripheral members. Elizabeth Glazer, the chief of the organized crime unit in the United States Attorney's office for the Southern District, described the White Tigers as a relatively undisciplined gang of 35 to 40 members. What is known for sure for is that membership of the gang was regular to other gangs of the time in Flushing Queens, compared to the larger gangs of Manhattan like the Ghost Shadows and Flying Dragons which had 100 core members and 200 peripheral members.

=== Chris Chin ===
Chris Chin gang leader addressed in the hearing before Asian Organized Crime Permanent Subcommittee on Investigations of the Committee on Governmental Affairs First Session on October 3, November 5–6, 1991.

=== Ah Kin ===
Ah Kin is Chris Chin's brother and who admitted that Lobster had collected a red packet full of money at a new night club in the Dragon's territory named the Fa Chung Fa. Breaking the truce that Elmhurst was for the Green Dragons and that Flushing was for the White Tigers.

=== Wei Hung Lee ===
Wei Hung Lee arrested on June 2, 1993, for immigrant smuggling. He was 32 years old.

=== David Lien ===
David (Lobster) Lien, whose nickname refers to one of his favorite dishes, arrested at a grocery store on Elizabeth Street in Chinatown, that is run by his family, on June 2, 1993. Charged with murder, arson and racketeering activity over a five-year period.

=== Edwin Arroyo ===
Edwin (Lumpy) Arroyo, named for a piece of flesh between two scars on his forehead, was arrested from the Edgecombe Correctional Facility on 163d Street in the Bronx, where he is on a work release program on June 2, 1993. He was charged with murder, arson and racketeering activity over a five-year period.

=== Ruan Jian Wei ===
Ruan Jian Wei was arrested at his residence on Henry Street in Chinatown on June 2, 1993. He was also be arrested with the other gang members be charged with murder, arson and racketeering activity over a five-year period.

== Initiation ceremony ==
The White Tigers, for being a gang non-affiliated to a Tong, did not have the same traditional values as gangs that were allied to older and institutional Triads. In a traditional Triad an especially promising juvenile delinquent is brought to a secret place, where he meets others who have also been recruited, Incense is burned and an oath they would is taken whereby the new recruits are made to swear lifelong allegiance to the Triad society. The oath says:

"I shall suffer death by five hundred thunderbolts if I do not keep this oath (…) I will always acknowledge my Hung [Triad] brothers when they identify themselves. If I ignore them, I shall be killed by a myriad of swords (…) If I am arrested after committing an offence, I must accept my punishment and never try to implicate any of my sworn brothers. If I do, I will be killed by five hundred thunderbolts (…)".

However, one White Tiger member recalled he joined the gang by "accepting their invitation, going to a restaurant, celebrating by eating and drinking until we got drunk". There was no initiation ceremony.

== Human smuggling ==
Like the Fuk Ching gang, the White Tigers typically helped immigrant smugglers by meeting immigrants as they arrived in the United States by air or by sea and holding them captive until payment of a smuggling fee was arranged. Many women were forced into sex trafficking to work at massage parlors, which are used as brothels. In a house in Bayside, Queens, were found 22 Chinese immigrants being guarded by members of the White Tigers. The immigrants had arrived on June 2, 1993 in California.

== Indictments ==
In 1993, 17 White Tigers were indicted for murder by the NYPD and DEA.

== In popular culture ==
The gang was described in the movie Revenge of the Green Dragons being the main rivals of the Green Dragons which lead to tortures and to half a dozen killings.
