= Canal Street (Manhattan) =

Street in Manhattan, New York

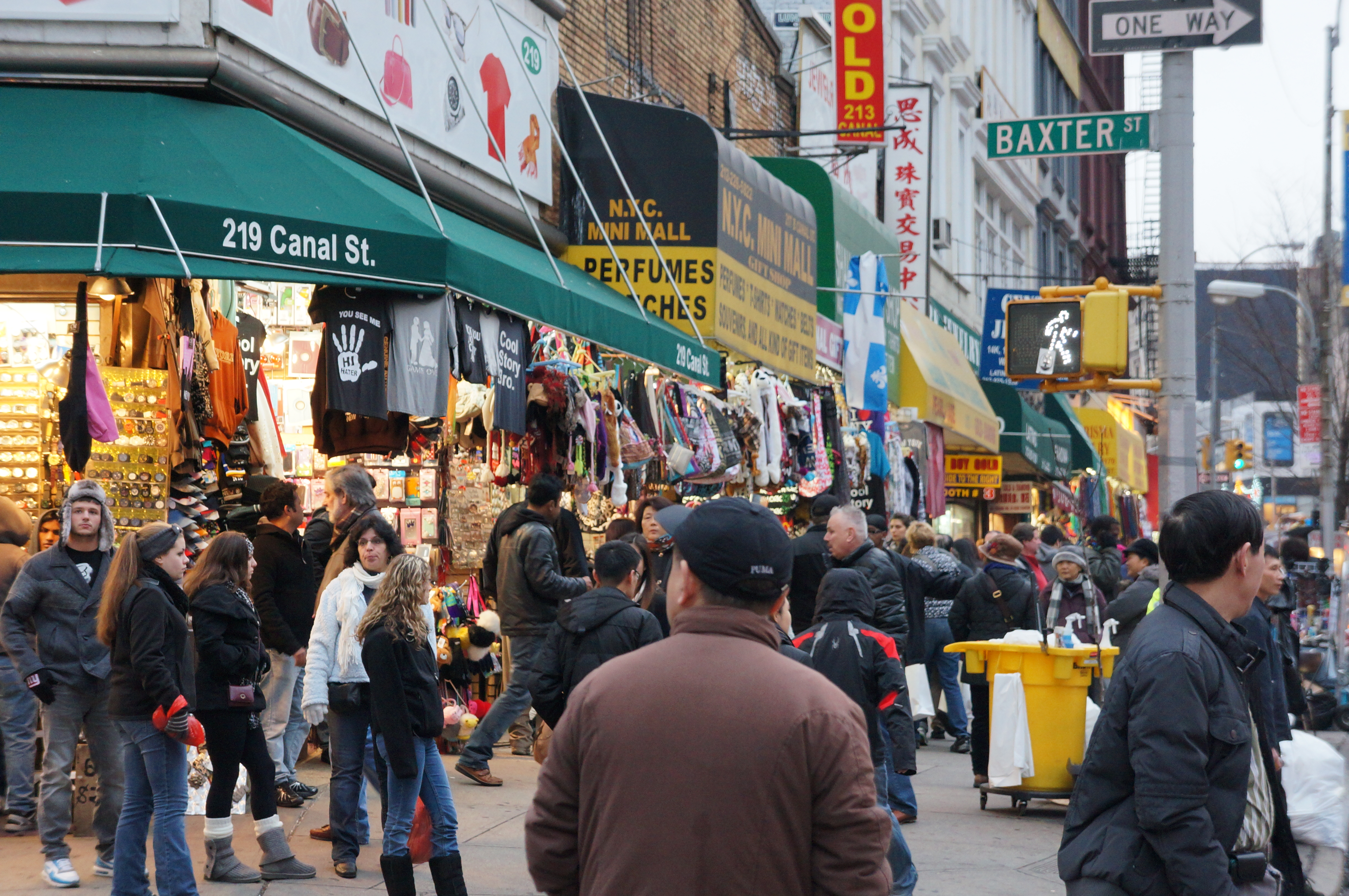
Stores and vendors dot Canal Street, hawking merchandise

Canal Street (Chinese: 堅尼街) is a major east–west street in Lower Manhattan, New York City, United States, running over 1 mile (1.6 km) from East Broadway between Essex and Jefferson Streets in the east, to West Street between Watts and Spring Streets in the west. It runs through the neighborhood of Chinatown, and forms the southern boundaries of SoHo and Little Italy as well as the northern boundary of Tribeca. The street acts as a major connector between Jersey City, New Jersey, via the Holland Tunnel (I-78), and Brooklyn in New York City via the Manhattan Bridge. It is a two-way street for most of its length, with two unidirectional stretches between Forsyth Street and the Manhattan Bridge.

Canal Street follows the path of underground waterworks that had been built in the early 19th century to drain a series of marshy and eventually sewage-filed ponds, including Collect Pond.

== History ==
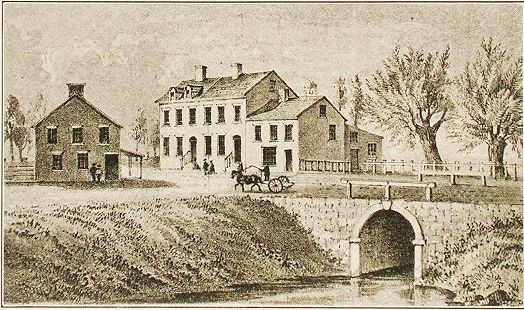
Broadway crossing the canal in 1811

By 1800, Collect Pond, one of New York City's few natural sources of fresh water, had become completely polluted with sewage and run-off from the tanneries, breweries, and other workshops and factories around it. Run-off from the pond, including one "sluggish stream" which traveled part of the route of the future Canal Street, fed nearby swamps and marshes which prevented the city from continuing its northward growth. To deal with this, the city's Common Council ordered that the swamps be drained and, in 1803, that the pond itself be filled in. A drain was built continuing the path of the "sluggish stream" to the Hudson River, which redirected the underground springs which watered the swamps. The pond was successfully drained by 1813 or 1815.

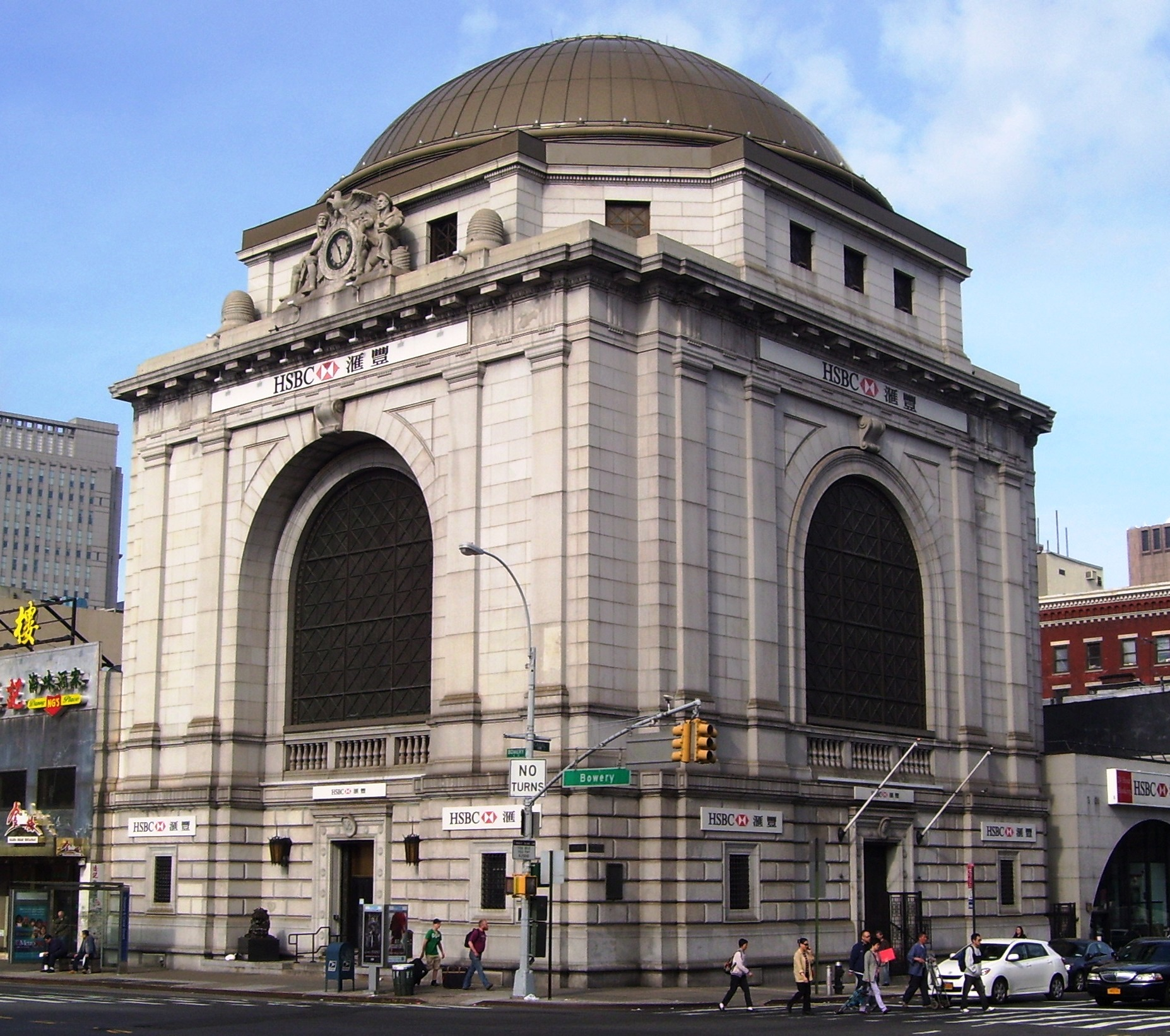
The Citizens Savings Bank building at 58 Bowery on the corner of Canal Street in Chinatown, currently an HSBC bank branch and also a New York City Landmark

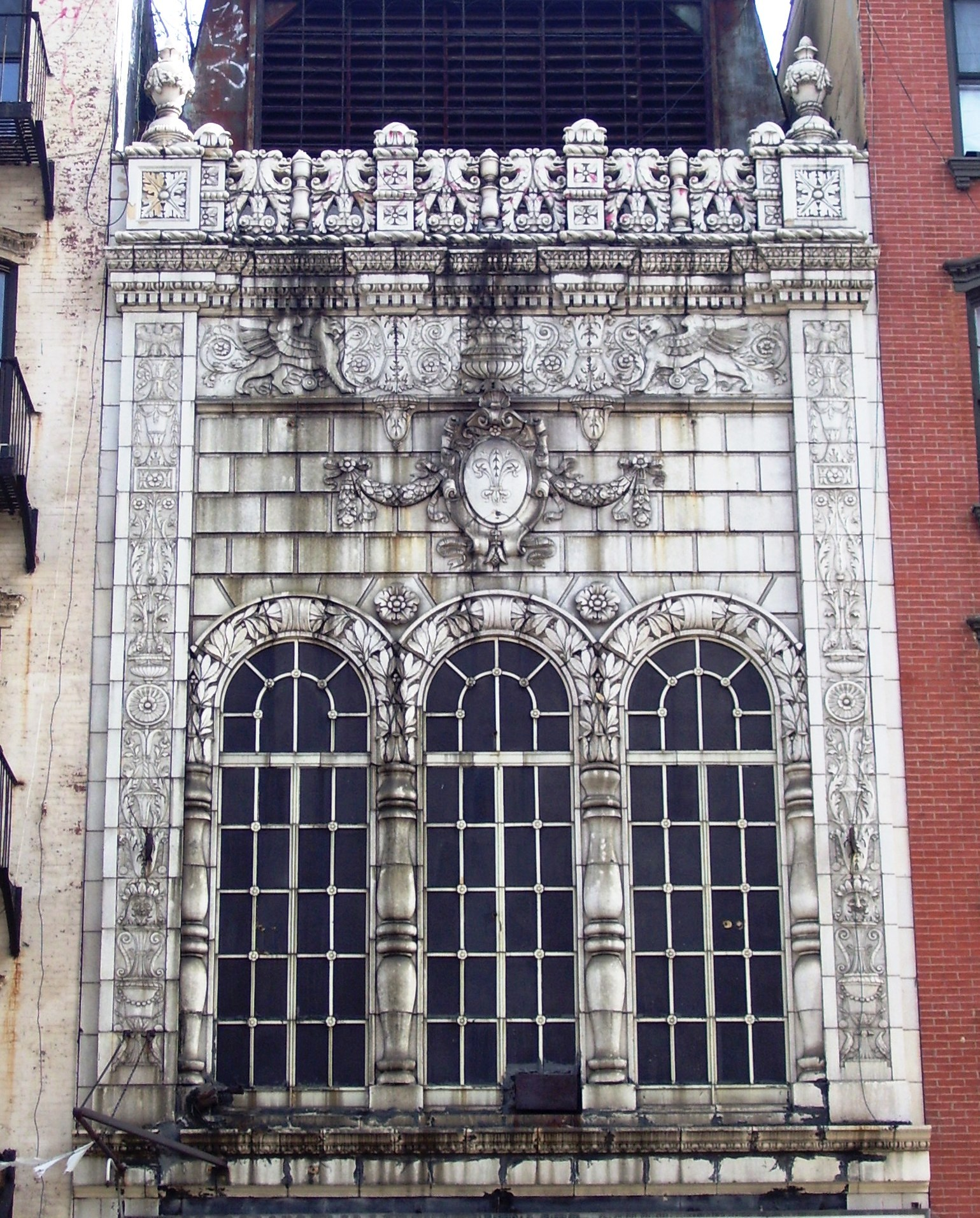
The former Loew's Canal Street Theatre at 31 Canal Street, a New York City Landmark

The area was developed, but the springs remained and caused the "dry" land to be boggy and uneven. The Common Council then authorized a canal, in the form of a 40-foot wide, 8-foot deep ditch, which would continue carrying off the excess water. Because it was not efficient, and did not have sufficient flow, it, too, became an open sewer. The city covered it over in 1819, but as it had no air traps, the covered canal became a stinking covered sewer. Canal Street was completed in 1820, following the path of the covered canal and named for it. The historic townhouses and newer tenements that had been built along Canal Street quickly fell into disrepair, and the eastern stretch of Canal Street came within the ambit of the notorious Five Points slum as property values and living conditions plummeted.

Early in the 20th century, the jewelry trade centered on the corner of Canal Street and Bowery, but moved mid century to the modern Diamond District on 47th Street. In the 1920s, the Citizens Savings Bank built a notable domed headquarters at the intersection's southwest corner which remains a local landmark. The portion of Canal Street around Sixth Avenue was New York's principal market for electronics parts for a quarter-century after the closing of Radio Row to make way for the building of the World Trade Center.

=== Reputation as hawkers' haven ===
Canal Street is a bustling commercial district, crowded with comparatively low-rent open storefronts, and street vendors to the west; banks and jewelry shops to the east. For a generation after World War II, the former segment hosted many stores selling exotic high-tech components to would-be inventors and engineers. Canal Street is also the main Chinese jewelry business district of Chinatown. Tourists as well as locals pack its sidewalks every day to frequent the open-air stalls and bare-bones stores selling items such as perfume, purses, hardware, and industrial plastics at low prices. Many of these goods are grey market imports and many notoriously counterfeit, with fake trademarked brand names on electronics, clothing and personal accessories (including the fake Rolex watches that have become a Manhattan cliché). Bootleg CDs and DVDs were common, and were offered for sale on Canal Street—often before they were even officially released in stores or the theater—in makeshift stands and suitcases or simply laid out on bedsheets.

Widespread sale of these counterfeit goods persists along Canal Street and in its hidden back rooms despite frequent police raids. In addition, legislation was proposed in 2013 to try to make purchasing counterfeit items a crime; this would let the city's economy earn back at least $1 billion annually in taxes.

=== 9/11 attack ===
After the 9/11 attack on the World Trade Center in 2001, Canal Street was the northern-most boundary of the area initially closed to everyone but residents and emergency personnel. When the 9/11 Victims Compensation Fund was established, Canal Street was again the northern cut-off for the World Trade Center Exposure Zone.

== Transportation ==
Canal Street is served by the New York City Subway at seven stations, west to east:

- Canal Street (IRT Broadway–Seventh Avenue Line) at Varick Street, served by the 1 and 2 trains
- Canal Street (IND Eighth Avenue Line) at Sixth Avenue, served by the A, C, and E trains
- Canal Street (BMT Broadway, Manhattan Bridge, and Nassau Street Lines, and IRT Lexington Avenue Line) at Broadway, Lafayette Street, and Centre Street, served by the 4, 6, <6>, J, N, Q, R, W, and Z trains at four separate sets of platforms
- East Broadway (IND Sixth Avenue Line) at East Broadway, served by the F and <F> trains

Canal Street is also served by the New York City Bus system, though no routes actually run on Canal Street. Routes intersecting with the street include M20 at Hudson Street (northbound) and at Varick Street (southbound); M55 at Sixth Avenue (northbound) and Broadway (southbound); M103 at Bowery; M15/M15 SBS at Allen Street; and M9 at Essex/Rutgers Streets.
