= Lung Kong Tin Yee Association =

Worldwide fraternity of ethnic Chinese

- Traditional Chinese: 龍岡親義公所
- Simplified Chinese: 龙冈亲义公所
Transcriptions
Standard Mandarin
- Hanyu Pinyin: Lónggāngqīnyì Gōngsuǒ
Yue: Cantonese
- Yale Romanization: Lùhng-Gōng-Chān-Yih Gūng-só
- Jyutping: lung^{4} gong^{1} can^{1} ji^{6} gung^{1} so^{2}

Four Families
- Traditional Chinese: 四姓
- Simplified Chinese: 四姓
Transcriptions
Standard Mandarin
- Hanyu Pinyin: Sìxìng
Yue: Cantonese
- Yale Romanization: Sei-sing
- Jyutping: sei^{3} sing^{3}

The Lung Kong Tin Yee Association, also known as the Four Families (四姓), is a worldwide ethnic fraternity, primarily a four-surname clan association for overseas Chinese. The Lung Kong Ancient Temple was founded 1662 in Kaiping, Guangdong, China. The first overseas Lung Kong associations were established in 1866 at Singapore and in 1876 at San Francisco, California. Since then, the Lung Kong associations have grown and spread over the world, fueled by the Chinese diaspora, with total membership in the millions.

== History ==
The Lung Kong Ancient Temple (龍岡古廟) was founded 1662 by members of the four clans -- Liu (劉), Guan (關), Zhang (張), Zhao (趙) -- in the village of Lung Kong (Longgang), Shuikou district in Kaiping (開 平), Guangdong (廣 東), to foster the moral community and unity of the Four Families (四 姓 一 家). The solidarity of the four clans can be traced all the way back to the sworn brotherhood in the late Han dynasty of the Four Brothers: Liu Bei 劉 備 (161–223), Guan Yu 關 羽 (160–220), Zhang Fei 張 飛 (?–221), and Zhao Yun 趙 雲 (?–229).

In 184, Lui Bei, Guan Yu, Zhang Fei, took the following legendary oath of brotherhood at the Peach Garden; in 200, Zhao Yun joined them to form the Four Brothers.

We, ... though of different families, vow to be brothers, swear to unite our hearts and strength, to help each other in danger; to serve the country as well as to save the people. We ask not the same day of birth, but are willing to die the same day. May Heaven and Earth, witness our vow. If we forsake righteousness or kindness, may Heaven and men destroy us.

== Lung Kong in the United States ==
=== California ===
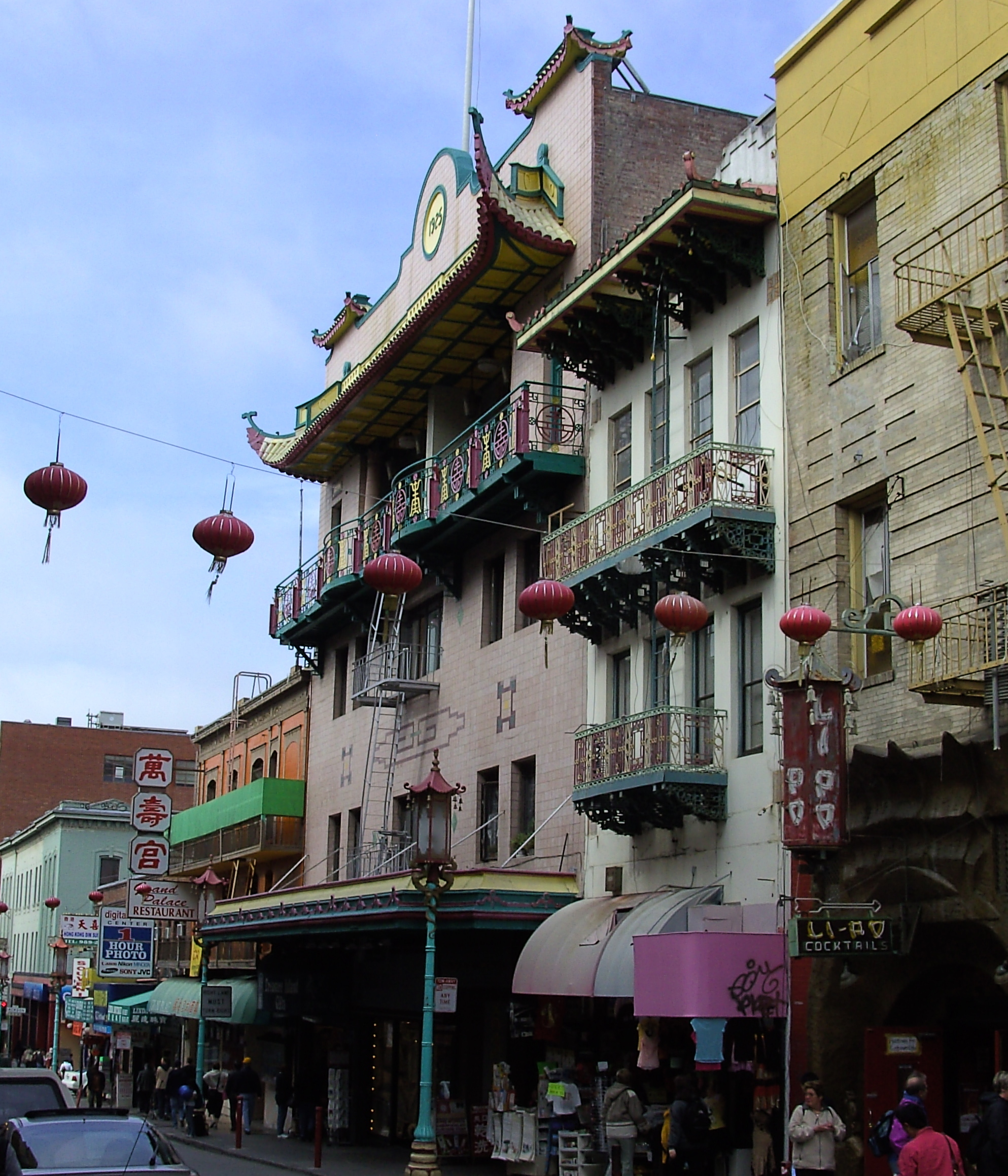
Ming Yee Building at 924–932 Grant Avenue in Chinatown, San Francisco

The California Gold Rush and construction of the transcontinental railroad in the mid-1800s led many men, mainly Cantonese from the Pearl River Delta in Guangdong Province, to immigrate to California. Due to social hostilities and discrimination, most immigrants were forced to stay in the San Francisco Chinatown area. Many different family groups started to form clan associations.

In 1876, the four families of (in Cantonese) Lew (劉), Quan (關), Jung (張), and Chew (趙) built a "Lung Kong Ancient Temple" in the heart of San Francisco Chinatown, a replica of the same Temple in Lung Kong village (龍岡村), Shui Kou town (水口镇) in Hoiping (開平), Guangdong province, built in 1662 as a place of worship and meetings. As years passed, more four-family members arrived in San Francisco. Around 1895, two four-family associations had organized: the San Francisco Lung Kong Association and the San Francisco Mu Tin Association (later changing its name to Ming Yee Association). The former engaged in fraternal activities such as providing a place for meetings, promoting social activities for members, and aiding newly arrived members from Guangdong Province, China. The latter was formed for the protection of its members from unfair hostilities.

The San Francisco earthquake of 1906 completely destroyed the Temple and all historical records. In 1910, the four-family forefathers built a new "Lung Kong Building" at 1034 Stockton Street which became the home of the San Francisco Lung Kong Association. In 1924, another building was acquired at 924 Grant Avenue, named the "Ming Yee Building", in which the San Francisco Lung Kong Association has resided ever since. As economic opportunities began to open across the country, four-family members traveled to different parts of the country to work, settle, and form additional four-family associations with names such as Lung Kong (龍岡), Mu Tin (睦親), Ming Yee (名義), and Four Brothers (四兄弟).
