= Hip Sing Association =

Chinese-American criminal organization

- Traditional Chinese: 協勝公會
- Simplified Chinese: 协胜公会
Transcriptions
Standard Mandarin
- Hanyu Pinyin: Xiéshèng Gōnghuì
Yue: Cantonese
- Yale Romanization: Hip-sing Gūng-wúi
- Jyutping: hip^{3} sing^{3} gung^{1} wui^{2}

Hip Sing Tong
- Traditional Chinese: 協勝堂
- Simplified Chinese: 协胜堂
Transcriptions
Standard Mandarin
- Hanyu Pinyin: Xiéshèngtáng
Yue: Cantonese
- Yale Romanization: Hip-sing Tòhng
- Jyutping: hip^{3} sing^{3} tong^{4}

The Hip Sing Association or HSA, formerly known as the Hip Sing Tong, is a Chinese-American criminal organization/gang formed as a labor organization in New York City's Chinatown during the early 20th century (perhaps c. 1904). The Cantonese name "Hip Sing" (協勝) translates roughly to "cooperating for success." The Hip Sing Tong, along with their rivals the Four Brothers and the On Leong Tong, would be involved in violent Tong wars for control of Chinatown during the early 1900s. During the 1930s and 1940s, the Hip Sings were involved in drug trafficking operations with the Kuomintang (KMT) and later the Office of Policy Coordination (OPC). They would later establish chapters in Chinese-American communities throughout the United States in major cities such as Chicago, Seattle and San Francisco (the latter being subject to a major drug raid by authorities in 1996). Recently some branches have begun to transform back into the legitimate fraternal organization they started as over a century prior.

== Early history ==
Like many Tongs, it was founded to protect its members from the rampant anti-Chinese prejudice of European America society and provide them with a semi-legitimate community structure since they could not rely on police or court systems to resolve internal community disputes. Also like many other Tongs, it eventually became involved in vice in order to fund its operations. While it is arguably most famous for its war with the On Leong Tong in Manhattan's Chinatown, the group that would become the Hip Sing Tong did not actually originate within New York but rather on the West Coast within San Francisco. It moved into New York City in the late 1800s, and soon began to compete with the On Leong Tong for local control under the guidance of its then-leader Sai Wing Mock. This rivalry would eventually erupt into decades of violence, a part of a nationwide conflict between Tongs known as the Tong Wars.

== Recent history ==
In the last fifty to sixty years, efforts began from within the group to clean up their public image by obfuscating their illegal activities, and in several chapters this would transform into a genuine attempt to become a purely law-abiding organization. There were clear transfers of illegal activities to plausibly deniable associated street gangs, like in New York City where the Hip Sing Tong secretly used the Flying Dragons to carry out crimes in their stead. However, due to crackdowns, the links between the Hip Sing Association and their gangs become increasingly frayed and some sources believe that the gang had fully broken out of Hip Sing control as early as 1994.

Since the late 1990s, branches of the group have turned their original attempts at plausible deniability into a genuine trend towards becoming fully law-abiding fraternal organizations like other Tongs. The NYC HSA is a permanent member of the Chinese Consolidated Benevolent Association and has gotten HSA officer Eric Ng elected president of the organization. Under his presidency, the CCBA has specifically focused on public outreach and fostering direct cooperation between the CCBA and the NYPD to counter gangs and street crime, and members of the NYPD regularly appear at CCBANY-hosted public events to meet with Eric Ng and other members to discuss neighborhood issues and educate the public.

However, other branches have seemingly remained involved with organized crime. In contrast to the positive public relationship between the NYC branch and the NYPD, as recently as 2018 a representative of the Chicago police refused to publicly discuss its city's HSA chapter with a journalist due to "ongoing gang investigations". And on the West Coast the Portland branch was subject to a major anti-drug trafficking raid by authorities in July 2012. The secretive nature of the group and apparent relative autonomy between chapters makes it difficult to determine how individual chapters actions reflect on the current trajectory of the group as a whole.

== Notable Members ==
- Sai Wing Mock AKA "Mock Duck"
- Kai Su "Benny" Ong AKA "Uncle Seven"
- Gee Jon
- Warry Charles

== Branches ==
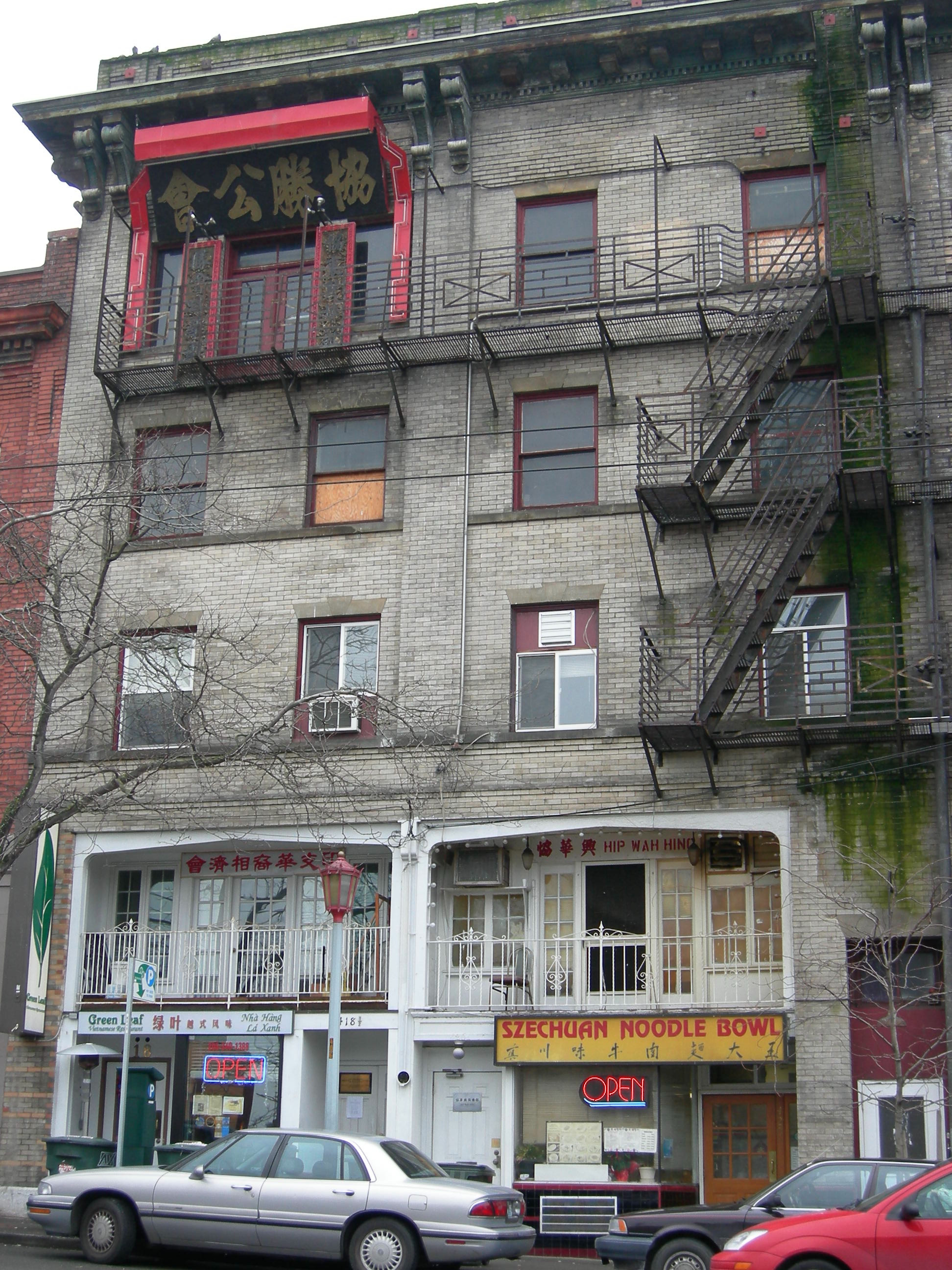
The Hip Sing Association building in Seattle, Washington.

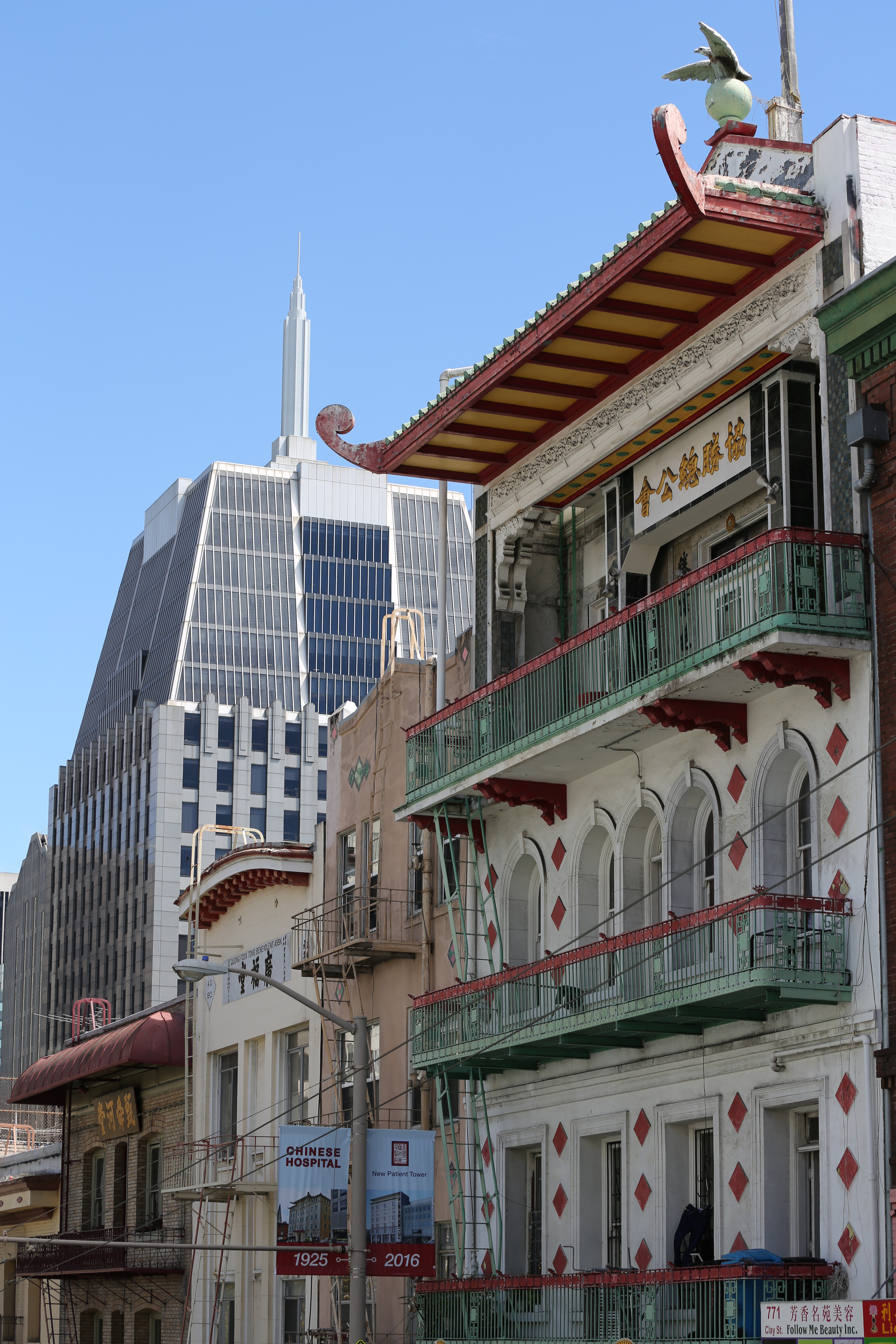
Hip Sing Association building (pale with red diamonds) in Chinatown, San Francisco

The Hip Sing Association has several branches in the United States including in:

- Boise, Idaho – 215 S Capitol Boulevard (defunct)
- Boston, Massachusetts – 162 Lincoln Street
- Chicago, Illinois – 1121 W Argyle Street
- Cleveland, Ohio – 4301 Payne Avenue
- Denver, Colorado – 238 Broadway (defunct)
- Doraville, Georgia – 5799 New Peachtree Road
- Los Angeles, California – 428 Gin Ling Way
- Minneapolis, Minnesota – 2633 Nicollet Avenue
- New York, New York – 15 Pell Street
- Philadelphia, Pennsylvania – 938 Race Street
- Pittsburgh, Pennsylvania – 529 2nd Avenue
- Portland, Oregon – 211 NW 3rd Avenue
- San Antonio, Texas – 1723 Bandera Road
- San Francisco, California – 761 Clay Street
- Seattle, Washington – 420 8th Avenue S
- Silver Spring, Maryland – 12705 New Hampshire Avenue
