= Ghost Shadows =

Chinese American street gang (1971–1990s)

- Founded: 1971
- Founding location: New York City
- Years active: 1970s–1990s
- Territory: New York City, Houston Texas, Providence, Rhode Island
- Ethnicity: Cantonese and Taishanese
- Criminal activities: Racketeering, extortion, illegal gambling, assault, murder, armed robbery and kidnapping
- Allies: On Leong Tong, Big Circle Gang, Tiny Rascal Gang
- Rivals: Flying Dragons

Ghost Shadows
- Traditional Chinese: 鬼影幫
- Simplified Chinese: 鬼影帮
Transcriptions
Standard Mandarin
- Hanyu Pinyin: Guǐyǐngbāng
Yue: Cantonese
- Yale Romanization: Gwái-Yíng Bōng
- Jyutping: gwai^{2} ying^{2} bong^{1}

The Ghost Shadows, or GSS, was a Chinese American street gang that was prominent in New York City's Chinatown from the early 1970s to the mid 1990s.

== History ==
Formed in 1971 by immigrants from Taiwan and Hong Kong, the gang was affiliated with the On Leong Tong. They adopted the colors black and white as their clothing to match the name of the set. Throughout the 1980s, the gang was often engaged in bloody turf wars with other Chinatown gangs such as the older Flying Dragons, affiliated with Hip Sing Tong and the Division Street Boys affiliated with Tung On Association.

Their activities included extortion, kidnapping, murder, racketeering, drug trafficking and illegal gambling. The Ghost Shadows' influence was widespread, having links to Chinatowns in other cities, as well as links to Sicilian-American Mafia families. The organization is defunct due to Federal RICO crackdowns during the 1990s.

== Members ==
=== Wing Yeung Chan ===
Wing Yeung Chan (born January 6, 1945) was president of On Leong Tong and for a decade the leader of the Ghost Shadows. Charged with murder and racketeering, he was sentenced to 10 years in prison.

=== Applehead ===
Shui Ping Wu (born 1956), also known as Applehead (/ˈæpoʊˌhɛd/, with vocalized l), was one of the original founders of Ghost Shadows and a leader of breakaway factions of Ghost Shadows Bayard Boys during the late 1970s, up to his indictments on RICO statutes in the mid-1980s.

In 1977, Wu was charged with four others for extorting money from a restaurant employee in Montgomery County, MD. He pled guilty in a re-trial in 1983, suspending the final few years of his original 5 year sentence.

=== China Mac ===
Raymond Yu (born 1981), a rapper known professionally as China Mac, joined the Ghost Shadows gang at age 12. He was born in Brooklyn to Chinese immigrants from Hong Kong, and lived in a group home from age 8. As a gang member he says he dealt drugs, committed robberies, and served as a lookout at gambling houses. He served 3 years in jail for his gang crimes starting in 2000 at age 18. In 2003, shortly after release, he shot another rapper in an altercation and was imprisoned for 11 years.

Yu later built a career as an entertainer. He became an activist against anti-Asian racism, notably in response to the 2020 COVID-19 pandemic racist incidents in the U.S.
