= Music of New Jersey =

The U.S. state of New Jersey is located in the Northeastern United States and is part of the Mid-Atlantic region.

== Official symbols ==
New Jersey has no state song.

The square dance is "the American Folk Dance of the State of New Jersey".

== Indigenous music ==
The Lenape people were the original inhabitants of present-day New Jersey and surrounding areas to the north, south, and west. Social tribal songs were often named for animals, other tribes or groups, and even food. These brief songs were performed in group dances. A significant amount of this part of Lenape culture was lost as Dutch and later British settlers moved into the region and pushed the Lenape west. Eventually, the U.S. Government forcibly removed the majority of the Lenape to Indian Territory, now Oklahoma.

== Classical and operatic music ==
The New Jersey Symphony Orchestra, based at the New Jersey Performing Arts Center, the New Jersey State Opera, The Baroque Orchestra of New Jersey, and the New Jersey Ballet are located in the Newark area. These groups regularly travel to different venues throughout the state to give performances.

The Cape May Music Festival is held each year at the Mid-Atlantic Center for Arts and Humanities in Cape May, New Jersey, featuring classical and chamber music. The South Orange Performing Arts Center in South Orange, New Jersey, features classical soloists and ensembles. Other classical music performing groups throughout New Jersey include The Bay-Atlantic Symphony Orchestra, the Garden State Philharmonic, the Philharmonic of Southern New Jersey, and the Princeton Symphony Orchestra. These music groups perform throughout the state and present shows at universities, which serve as a home base for some of the groups.

American composer John Philip Sousa performed concerts on the lawn of the historic Congress Hall (Cape May hotel).

World-famous opera singer Frederica von Stade was born in Somerville, New Jersey. Acclaimed operatic tenor Michael Fabiano was born in Montclair and still resides in the state.

In 1796, William Dunlap of Perth Amboy wrote the first professional opera in the United States called, The Archers.

== Folk and bluegrass music ==
The Folk and Bluegrass scene in New Jersey consists of performances at festivals and small venues throughout the state, mostly in small cities and college towns with active music scenes. Some of these towns and cities include Montclair, Hoboken, New Brunswick, and Princeton.

One of the regions for early folk music in the colonial era is the Pine Barrens and shore regions of southern New Jersey. It was in the sandy, dense forests and small shore towns that the earliest settlers played musical elements from their home countries and sang stories of the new land they called home. Some examples ranged from Scots/Irish fiddle tunes to Yiddish and Lithuanian songs. In this region, stories and legends were sung, including the Jersey Devil.

Various workshops, music development institutions, and festivals throughout New Jersey have celebrated folk and bluegrass music for decades. The Folk Project has hosted many folk singers in recent years, including Richard Shindell, Bob Franke, and Odetta. The New Jersey Folk Festival is held every year at Rutgers University, celebrating a variety of artists, both nationally and locally known. Jim Murphy and The Pine Barons have been playing bluegrass at venues in southern New Jersey for over forty years. The Delaware Valley Bluegrass Festival takes place annually at the Salem County Fairgrounds in Woodstown, New Jersey. The Hurdy Gurdy Folk Music Club celebrates folk music in the northern part of the state. The Irish festival at the Jersey Shore celebrates Irish folk music every summer in Sea Girt.

John Dull, a Rutherford native, is a well-known folk artist who has worked with a wide variety of musicians in many genres. Progressive bluegrass band Railroad Earth hails from Stillwater, New Jersey. Hunterdon County, New Jersey native Sharon Van Etten is an acclaimed singer of folk and indie rock music, performing solo as well as with many other famous artists. David Grisman, born in Hackensack, is a celebrated mandolinist and Newgrass composer. Another highly respected New Jersey folk artist is Meg Baird. John Gorka, a leader of the New Folk movement, was born in Edison. New Jersey folk singer and activist Catherine Moon has released several critically acclaimed independent albums. Atlantic City native and folk singer Jim Albertson sings songs that tell stories of South Jersey. The variety of folk and bluegrass music reflects the cultural past of America and New Jersey, including stories of the state's diverse ethnic groups, as well as revivalist styles.

== Jazz ==
In the early 20th century, Newark was an important center for jazz innovation with other smaller New Jersey towns also providing talent. James P. Johnson of New Brunswick and other pioneers helped invent stride. Willie "The Lion" Smith, who grew up in Newark, played stride as well as other styles of jazz piano. Donald Lambert of Princeton was another famous jazz pianist. Jazz alto saxophonist Richie Cole grew up and began playing in Mercer County. Other famous New Jersey jazzmen include bandleader Count Basie, saxmen Hank Mobley, Wayne Shorter and James Moody, vocalist Babs Gonzales, trumpeter Woody Shaw of Newark, trumpeter Johnny Coles of Trenton, and trumpeter Dizzy Gillespie who lived in Englewood from 1965 until his death in 1993.

Newark was also the birthplace and home of the jazz singer Sarah Vaughan – one of jazz's most esteemed vocalists. Viola Wells, also known as "Miss Rhapsody," was a Newark native who began her career singing jazz, blues, and religious songs at clubs in Newark, and eventually throughout the United States and Europe. Bill Evans was born in Plainfield and attended North Plainfield High School. One of the more popular jazz venues in Newark in the first half of the Twentieth century was the Grand Hotel on West Market Street. Savoy Records, an early important jazz record label, was located in Newark. Casa Blanca on Broad Street and The Cadillac Club are just two of the many Newark live jazz venues that have showcased performers in the Twentieth century.

The Institute of Jazz Studies at the Newark campus of Rutgers University has the largest library of jazz and jazz related items in the world. The Newark Museum has annual summer jazz concert series featuring world known artists. Atlantic City, beginning in the 1920s, was a world-famous venue for jazz performers, as well as other music. The Paradise Club on Illinois Avenue was billed as the world's first nightclub and hosted a wide variety of famous artists. Since 1979, Newark has been home to WBGO, the only 24/7 jazz radio station in the New York/Jersey City/Newark metro area.

Other well known jazz instrumentalists from the Garden State include Max Weinberg, drummer for Bruce Springsteen, Leigh Howard Stevens, a marimba musician who re-invented the way the instrument is played by pioneering the "Musser-Stevens Grip, "Nick Lucas, Joe Pass, Jimmy Lyons, Larry Young, Steve Swallow, George Van Eps, Buster Williams, Tony Scott, Bucky Pizzarelli, John Pizzarelli, David S. Ware, Al Di Meola, and Steve Swell. Hundreds of jazz albums for Blue Note Records were recorded in Alfred Lion's home studio Englewood Cliffs, New Jersey.

The Jersey Shore Jazz & Blues Foundation (JSJBF) Festival ran annually in Red bank until 2004 when the local Chamber of Commerce turned it into a food festival. The JSJBF now runs free summer jazz and blues concerts along several shore towns. The Liberty Jazz Festival also occurs every year in Liberty State Park in Jersey City.

== R&B ==
Formed in 1964 in Jersey City, Kool & the Gang is well known for their Billboard Hot 100 #1 hit, "Celebration", as well as various other singles such as "Ladies Night" and "Get Down On It", and the band has won many awards throughout their career.

Blues is still rich in New Jersey, and is supported by two blues societies—North Jersey Blues Society (NJBS), and Jersey Shore Jazz & Blues Foundation (JSJBF).

The North Jersey Blues Society, a 501(c)(3) non-profit corporation, was founded to celebrate the heritage of blues music through the unity of fans, musicians, society members, venues, and business owners who will collaborate and promote the blues in Northern New Jersey. NJBS priorities include: Promoting the performance of local and national blues musicians in the Northern New Jersey; Offering blues artists and audiences artistic programming and venue opportunities; and Providing educational opportunities to increase awareness of blues music and art.

The Jersey Shore Jazz & Blues Foundation (JSJBF) not only organizes up to three free music festivals every summer, but it is also involved in the free weekly Sunday evening outdoor summer blues concerts in the West End section of Long Branch, and the monthly year-round blues venue in the Red Bank Woman's Club. Keb Mo, Kim Wilson, Popa Chubby and many others have played here. George Kerr produced "New Jersey Soul" groups such as the Whatnauts (from Baltimore) and the Escorts. Sylvia Robinson composed The Moments' big hit "Love on a Two Way Street". Paul Kyser produced Soul Generation and Jimmy Briscoe & the Little Beavers.

== Hip-hop ==
Hip hop group Sugar Hill Gang, artists behind one of the earliest major commercial hip-hop songs "Rapper's Delight" is from Englewood, New Jersey. Rapper Lauryn Hill, born in East Orange and raised in South Orange, has been noted as one of the best female rappers of all time by magazines like Billboard, winning the most Grammys of any female rapper. Hill's band, The Fugees, was formed in South Orange along with Wyclef Jean and Pras Michael. Rapper Redman was raised in Newark. Hip-hop trio Naughty by Nature originated in East Orange, New Jersey in 1987, under the group name the New Style. Rapper/Singer and Actress Queen Latifah was born in Newark, New Jersey, and grew up in nearby East Orange. Rapper and actor Ice-T was also born in Newark, and grew up in Summit, New Jersey. Rapper Apache was born in Jersey City. Rapper Coi Leray was raised in Hackensack. Rapper Fetty Wap, best known for his Billboard Hot 100 #2 single "Trap Queen", was born and raised in Paterson. Rapper/R&B artist Akon moved to Union City as a child, but had also lived and grew up in Newark and Jersey City.

== House music ==
See New Jersey house

== EDM ==
Electronic music group Cash Cash formed in 2008 releasing their hit song "Take Me Home" in 2013. The song peaked at No. 57 on the Billboard Hot 100. A collaboration with American singer P!nk earned the group a No. 1 on the Dance Club Songs chart from the song "Can We Pretend".

== Rock ==
=== Rock & roll and classic rock ===
Frankie Valli and the Four Seasons were rock and roll stars in the 1960s, scoring hits with "Sherry", "Big Girls Don't Cry", and "Walk Like a Man". The Shirelles, formed in Passaic, were a girl group popular in the early 1960s. Garage rock band the Doughboys formed in Plainfield in 1965; The Critters were also from Plainfield and formed in 1964; other New Jersey garage bands included Richard and the Young Lions from Newark, and the Myddle Class from Berkeley Heights. Figures of Light were a garage rock band formed in New Brunswick in 1970.

Bruce Springsteen and the E-Street Band became one of New Jersey's most successful rock groups with the release of their Born to Run album in 1975. Springsteen's friends and fellow Jersey Shore natives, Southside Johnny and the Asbury Jukes, also saw commercial success. Donald Fagen of Steely Dan was born in Passaic and grew up in South Brunswick. New Brunswick band Looking Glass scored a number one hit with "Brandy (You're a Fine Girl)" in 1972.

The Jersey Shore sound has been described as a style of rock and roll associated with the music scene of Asbury Park, New Jersey, that developed during the late 1960s and 1970s. It combines rock and roll with influences from rhythm and blues, soul, and blues, often featuring horns and a bar-band-oriented live performance style; one contemporary account described it as the "New Jersey Sound", while later descriptions have characterized it as rock and roll with an R&B influence. The sound became particularly associated with Bruce Springsteen, Southside Johnny and the Asbury Jukes, and the E Street Band, with the Asbury Jukes' horn-heavy combination of rock and roll, soul, blues, and R&B becoming closely identified with the emerging Shore music scene in the mid-1970s.

=== Punk and alternative ===
Punk rock and hardcore have played an important role in the music of New Jersey, with many prominent artists in these genres originating from the state. This included many figures from the punk and new wave movements. Blondie frontwoman Debbie Harry and drummer Clem Burke both grew up in New Jersey (Hawthorne and Bayonne, respectively). Patti Smith grew up in Deptford Township, Tom Verlaine, founder and frontman of the punk/new wave group Television, was from Morristown, and Richie Ramone, the Ramones' drummer from '84-'89, hails from Passaic. The Feelies were formed in Haledon in 1976.

Arguably the most famous and influential punk band from New Jersey is The Misfits founded in 1977 in Lodi, New Jersey, by singer and songwriter Glenn Danzig, who in 1983 broke from the band and formed Samhain and in 1987 Danzig. Among the early hardcore bands was Rosemary's Babies. also from Lodi, whose drummer Eerie Von, would become bassist for both Samhain and Danzig. Adrenalin O.D. is usually credited with igniting the early N.J. hardcore scene at the dawn of the 1980s. A.O.D. were the first New Jersey hardcore band to release their own records (on the punk indie label they formed called Buy Our Records), tour extensively and be featured on some of the biggest compilations in punk. U.S. Chaos influenced North America for Skinhead and OI Predating as The Radicals in 1978. All Hailing from East Paterson, Bergen and Passaic counties. Emerging in 1983 after the breakup of three-piece Impossible Task, seminal skate punk band Hogan's Heroes was founded in South-Central New Jersey in 1984. Indie rock and punk band Titus Andronicus formed in Glen Rock, New Jersey in 2005.

Several prominent college rock bands originated in the state. The Smithereens were formed in Carteret and built up a following in the state, becoming an early success in the alternative genre with songs like "A Girl Like You" and "Behind the Wall of Sleep". Other alternative bands, such as Wayne's Dramarama (of "Anything, Anything" fame) and Westfield's Whirling Dervishes, saw success during the 1980s and 1990s. Indie rock band Yo La Tengo formed in Hoboken in the mid-1980s. Power pop band and New Jersey natives Fountains of Wayne based their name on a shop from their hometown of Wayne.

My Chemical Romance, formed in Jersey City, New Jersey in late 2001, had a number 2 album on the Billboard 200 with their 2006 album The Black Parade. The Early November formed in 1999 in Hammonton, NJ, and after a 4-year hiatus beginning in 2007, reunited in 2011. Often referred to as modern progenitors of the Jersey Shore sound popularized by Bruce Springsteen, The Gaslight Anthem came together in New Brunswick in 2005 and released 5 studio albums to a mix of critical acclaim and high chart positions, including two Top 5 records with Handwritten and Get Hurt. The New Brunswick, New Jersey music scene is heavily influenced by alternative rock and hardcore punk. The city has been home to a large number of rock bands.

=== Hard rock and heavy metal ===
Hair metal group Bon Jovi has been one of the most popular bands in the world since the mid-1980s. Beginning in the 1990s and continuing into the 2000s, Bon Jovi has experimented with other genres, such as country rock. Skid Row is a New Jersey–based heavy-metal band formed in the mid-1980s and reached the height of its success in the early 1990s. Sebastian Bach, formerly of Skid Row, is a Canadian singer who has lived in New Jersey for almost two decades and still fronts bands. Since the early 1980s, the New Jersey bands Overkill and Hades have been recording and performing thrash metal around the world. Trixter is a glam metal band also from New Jersey. Monster Magnet is a very well known stoner rock metal band from Red Bank with releases on labels such as Elektra. Ripping Corpse is a well known thrash metal band from Red Bank. Blues Traveler was formed in Princeton in 1987.

In the early and mid 1980s the New Jersey nightclub culture realized tremendous popularity with various live acts playing hard rock, heavy metal and dance oriented New Wave music. Some of the more notable acts touring the club circuit was Twisted Sister fronted by lead singer Dee Snider.

In 1984 the Crossover Thrash Metal band, Method Of Destruction was formed with Stormtroopers Of Death former frontman, Billy Milano. The 1987 debut, U.S.A. For M.O.D. was released on NJ based label, Megaforce Records and entered the Billboard Top 200 charts soon after. The Dillinger Escape Plan from Morris Plains and The Number Twelve Looks Like You from Paramus were essential in solidifying the state as a forerunner of the mathcore and experimental metal scenes as well as several of the members of Candiria. New Jersey is also home to the highly acclaimed progressive power metal band Symphony X, and funeral doom metal band Evoken. Brielle native Mark Tornillo was the lead singer for New Jersey metal band T.T. Quick and is now the lead singer for the German metal band Accept. Jeff Janiak, vocalist of British hardcore punk groups Discharge and Broken Bones was born in Livingston and has lived in Irvington and Toms River. Zakk Wylde, the founder of Black Label Society and guitarist for Ozzy Osbourne, was born in Bayonne and grew up in Jackson, New Jersey. Jersey City is the birthplace of both hard rock band Rye Coalition and psychedelic rock group The Black Hollies. New Jersey Stoner rock band Core had success with two albums in the 1990s. Hard rock band The Parlor Mob is from Red Bank. Soulfly guitarist Marc Rizzo grew up in Carlstadt.

== Pop ==
Pop music had no shortage of artists from New Jersey. One of the most successful artists of all time with an estimated 150 million record sales, Frank Sinatra, was born and raised in Hoboken. Sinatra began his career during the beginning of the swing era, and his music can be described as classical pop, easy listening, swing, and jazz. Today, Sinatra has three stars on the Hollywood Walk of Fame, a statue in Hoboken, a street and a park named after him in Hoboken, various buildings in universities named after him, as well as various streets named after him throughout the country. Frank Sinatra's daughter, Nancy Sinatra, also went on to become a successful pop artist, peaking in popularity during the 1960s.

Whitney Houston, one of the best selling artists of all time with over 220 million records sold worldwide, was born in Newark but primarily raised in East Orange. Houston's style was a combination of pop, R&B, soul, and gospel music, and became one of the most influential artists of all time as a result of her success and musical techniques. She had 11 number-one singles on the Billboard Hot 100 and is the only artist to have seven consecutive number-one singles on the chart. She has won dozens of awards in her career, and has been inducted into various Halls of Fame.

Italian-born Gioia Bruno emigrated to New Jersey as a child, growing up in Lodi. In 1986, Bruno relocated to Florida and became a labelmate of Houston's as a member of Expose. She later had a solo career on the dance charts. She sang on seven Billboard Hot 100 Top Ten hits, singing lead on three of them.

The Jonas Brothers, consisting of Joe, Nick, and Kevin Jonas, are a pop rock band formed in 2005. The brothers were all raised in Wyckoff and moved to Little Falls. The trio had a Disney Channel show and starred in Camp Rock. Halsey, a successful pop artist emerging in the mid-2010s, was born and raised in Edison.

Charlie Puth, Lea Michele, Debbie Harry, Dom Okon, Dionne Warwick, and Nick Mara also hail from New Jersey.

== Live venues ==
The State of New Jersey, with its dense and diverse population and its long history as a summer entertainment playground for the working and middle classes, produces a significant number of music institutions, events, and live music venues.

=== Small notable live NJ venues ===
Small NJ venues (capacity less than 1000)
Year	Venue	City	Capacity
1980s	The Meat Locker	Montclair	100 (estimated)
2026	Auditorium at the Bruce Springsteen Center for American Music	West Long Branch	241
1940	The Turf Club	Asbury Park	Undergoing restoration
1910	White Eagle Hall	Jersey City	800 standing / 400 seated
2020	The Vogel	Red Bank	800 (standing room)
1962 (renovated 2017)	Asbury Lanes	Asbury Park	700
1959	D'Jais	Belmar	700 (standing room only)
2021	Anchor Rock Club	Atlantic City	650
2019	New Brunswick Performing Arts Center (Elizabeth Ross Johnson Theater)	New Brunswick	463
1991	QXT's Nightclub	Newark	450
2021	The Underground at Carteret Performing Arts Center	Carteret	500
1973	The Stone Pony	Asbury Park, New Jersey	800 (indoor)
1996	Crossroads	Garwood	200
1981	The Court Tavern	New Brunswick	185
2004	Dingbatz	Clifton	200
2019	Avenel Performing Arts Center	Avenel	198
2012 (renovated 2024)	Hamilton Stage at Union County Performing Arts Center	Rahway	199
1993 (closed 2022)	The Saint	Asbury Park	175
2016	Clement's Place	Newark	80
2008	The Loft at Mainstage	Rahway	65
2014	The Lizzie Rose Music Room	Tuckerton	70 (seated)
2024	Bell Theater at Bell Works	Holmdel	285 (seated)

== Additional information on venues and events ==
The State of New Jersey has a diverse population that produces a significant number of live music performances and venues.

=== Rock, indie and punk live music ===
As of 2023, focal points of live local rock include:

- Asbury Park has a number of local venues with open mics and other performances. It is also home of Convention Hall, the Asbury Lanes, The Wonder Bar, The Saint, House of Independents, and The Stone Pony. Acts like Bruce Springsteen, Bon Jovi, and Southside Johnny and the Asbury Jukes frequented Asbury early in their careers.
- Dingbatz in Clifton is a venue for hard rock and metal bands.
- New Brunswick, formerly home to the Court Tavern and the Melody, is known for its "basement show" circuit.
- The "Orange Loop," an off-boardwalk area of Atlantic City, has a growing number of small live music bars, open mics, and rock clubs. Named for the orange-colored streets in the Monopoly (game), it runs roughly from the boardwalk inland to St. Nicholas of Tolentine Church.

=== Other venues ===
- Boardwalk Hall is located in Atlantic City.
- The Spring Camp Jam in The Pines is held every year, allowing people to camp on farms in southern New Jersey and enjoy a variety of live music performances.
- The final American concert of the A Conspiracy of Hope Amnesty International tour was broadcast live on MTV from Giants Stadium on June 15, 1986. The concert was twelve hours long and featured multiple acts including; U2, Lou Reed, Joan Baez, Bryan Adams, Peter Gabriel, and a reunited The Police.
- Live Earth, a worldwide television and Internet-streamed benefit music event promoting causes to stop global warming, took place during the spring of 2007 in the state. It used Giants Stadium in East Rutherford as the stage for its American concert venue. A wide array of performers, from a variety of music genres, took part in raising proceeds. Former Vice President Al Gore helped organize the effort.
- The Velvet Underground gave their first performance as a band at Summit High School in Summit, New Jersey.
- The Folk Project has hosted many local and internationally known folk music acts such as Richard Shindell, Bob Franke, and Odetta.
- The Prudential Center in Newark hosts concerts.
- The New Jersey Performing Arts Center, home of the New Jersey Symphony Orchestra, is also located in Newark.
- The Count Basie Theatre in Red Bank, is an historic venue that has hosted a variety of musical and performing artists over the past decades.
- MetLife Stadium is located in East Rutherford.
- The City Gardens was a famous punk venue 1978–1998 located in Trenton .
- The Capitol Theatre in Passaic hosted a number of famous acts in the late 1970s and early 1980s, including The Clash, Motörhead, Ozzy Osbourne, Van Halen, and Bruce Springsteen. The concert DVD R40 by the rock band RUSH features several songs performed by the band at the venue in 1976.
- The Sports Illustrated Stadium is located in Harrison.
- The Rustic Cabin, which was located on Route 9W in Englewood Cliffs, was the roadhouse where Frank Sinatra was discovered in 1939.
- The New Jersey Folk Festival is held annually by undergraduates of Rutgers University at the Douglass campus.
- The Appel Farm Arts and Music Center in Salem County, offers educational programs as well as performances of a wide variety of the arts.
- RWJBarnabas Health Arena is located in Toms River.
- The Susquehanna Bank Center in Camden is an outdoor amphitheater located on the Delaware River.
- The Osprey Hotel in Manasquan has hosted many Jersey Shore acts for years. The legendary band Salvation played a record 11 summers there from 1969 to 1980.
- The PNC Bank Arts Center in Holmdel is an outdoor amphitheater that hosts concerts and events.
- Palisades Amusement Park in Fort Lee/Cliffside Park staged major concerts at its famous music pavilion, featuring current pop/rock acts and teen idols, throughout the 1960s. They were hosted by then-WABC (AM) Musicradio disc jockey Cousin Brucie, a.k.a. Bruce Morrow. The attraction closed permanently in 1971. Coincidentally, the park's popularity inspired the monster 1962 rock hit, "Palisades Park", by Freddy Cannon. The tune was written by Chuck Barris, before his days as a pioneering TV game show producer. The song was covered by the Ramones on their 1989 album, Brain Drain.
- The CURE Insurance Arena is located in Trenton.
- The Pipeline in Newark hosted massive punk, skinhead, ska, alternative industrial and Goth acts in the 1980s and 1990s.
- The Bergen Performing Arts Center is located in Englewood.
- The Jersey Mike's Arena is located in Piscataway.
- The Paper Mill Playhouse in Millburn, is a venue famous throughout the state for presenting musicals.
- The State Theatre is located in New Brunswick.
- The Crossroads in Garwood hosts a variety of live music.
- The Wellmont Theatre is located in Montclair.
- Starland Ballroom is located in Sayreville.
- Hard Rock Live is located in Atlantic City.
- Maxwell's on Washington Ave., opened in 1978, was the center of the live music scene in Hoboken for decades. The club closed in July 2013. The venue opened under new management in 2014 as Maxwell's Tavern.
- Bruce Springsteen and the E Street Band played a record setting ten dates in a row at Giants Stadium in 2003.
- The Monsters of Rock tour in 1988, headlined by Van Halen, had one of its stops at Giants Stadium.
- Waterloo Village in Byram Township was one of the locations where the Lollapalooza Festival occurred in the early 1990s.
- The first Orion Music + More festival was a large two-day music festival hosted by Metallica in June 2012 at Bader Field in Atlantic City.
- The three-day All Points West Music and Arts Festival was held in the summers of 2008 and 2009 at Liberty State Park in Jersey City.
- The Wildwoods Convention Center is located in Wildwood.
- The Bamboozle was an annual three-day event that has a wide variety of musical acts and comedians. This festival has been held at the MetLife Sports complex as well as in Asbury Park. Bands vary from being independent label acts to acts known throughout the world. This was last held in 2012 and it is currently unknown whether it will make a return in the future.
- The Aquifer Music Venue in Clinton Hosted highly acclaimed Metalcore and Hardcore acts from all over the world in a suburban town off of Interstate 78.
- TD Bank Ballpark is located in Bridgewater.
- The Mayo Performing Arts Center in Morristown has live music performances.
- The Galaxy Night Club Somerdale – Where some of the hottest 1980s metal bands were scouted and signed including Bon Jovi, Skid Row, Cinderella, and Britny Fox.

Frank Sinatra (from Hoboken, died 1998) had at least one #1 Billboard Hot 100 hit with "Strangers in the Night" in 1966. Frankie Valli (who was portrayed in the play Jersey Boys) had 7 #1 Hot 100 hits in the 1960s and 1970s, including "December 1963 (Oh, What a Night)". Kool & the Gang had a #1 Hot 100 hit with "Celebration" in 1981. Bon Jovi had 4 #1 Hot 100 hits, including "Living on a Prayer" in 1987. Whitney Houston (died 2012) had 11 #1 Hot 100 hits in the 1980s and 1990s, including "I Will Always Love You" in 1992. P.M. Dawn had one #1 hit with "Set Adrift on Memory Bliss" in 1991. Lauryn Hill of the Fugees had a #1 Hot 100 hit with "Doo Wop (That Thing)" in 1998. Akon (who moved to Jersey City) had 2 #1 Hot 100 hits in the 2000s, including "I Wanna Love You" in 2006. The Jonas Brothers had one #1 Hot 100 hit with "Sucker" in 2019. Halsey has had 2 Hot 100 #1 hits like "Closer" with the Chainsmokers, in 2016.

== Audio broadcasting ==
Music is broadcast in New Jersey by terrestrial radio stations, cable FM, local wire networks, satellite and the Internet.

Radio stations WFMU from Jersey City, WSOU from Seton Hall in South Orange, New Jersey (winner of awards from publications such as Friday Morning Quarterback, the College Music Journal and Album Network) and WPRB from Princeton are three of the most well known independent/college radio stations in America. Newark's WBGO is one of the country's most important independent jazz stations. WRPR in Mahwah has also gained relevance for its rock programming. WDHA-FM "The Rock of New Jersey," is located in the Dover area and has a long history of providing North Jersey with both classic and modern rock. Madison, New Jersey native Eddie Trunk worked at WDHA early in his career. WGHT Radio is located in Northern New Jersey, and is a spring board for a long list on On Air Radio Talent. WGHT, formally known as WKER-AM, has been broadcasting at 1500-AM since the early 1960s. Jimmy Howes is currently WGHT's morning show host and Program Director. WNNJ in Newton, New Jersey, provides rock music to the Skylands Region of the state. WMGM (FM) in Atlantic City broadcasts rock music to South Jersey. WWNJ in Toms River, WWCJ in Cape May, and WWFM at the West Windsor campus of Mercer County Community College all broadcast classical music. The long running free form program Anything Anything with Rich Russo airs on both WDHA-FM and WRAT-FM. WDVR is a community radio station based in Sergeantsville, NJ broadcasting a variety of music, talk, and educational programming.

Internet radio stations also contribute to New Jersey's music scene. For example, Blowupradio.com, an Internet station devoted to underground Jersey rock, has been contributing to New Jersey's music scene since 2000. Other internet radio stations in New Jersey that contribute to New Jersey's music scene include ThePenguinRocks.com and AltrokRadio.com and DJJD's Metallicave on NuclearRockRadio.com.

== See also ==
- List of people from New Jersey

== Sources ==
- Andrea Witting, (2007) All Grown Up The Movie, U.S. Chaos cited interview, extensive.
- Blush, Steven (2001). American Hardcore: A Tribal History. Los Angeles, CA: Feral House. ISBN 0-922915-71-7.
