= Statue of Frank Sinatra =

Statue in Hoboken, New Jersey, U.S.

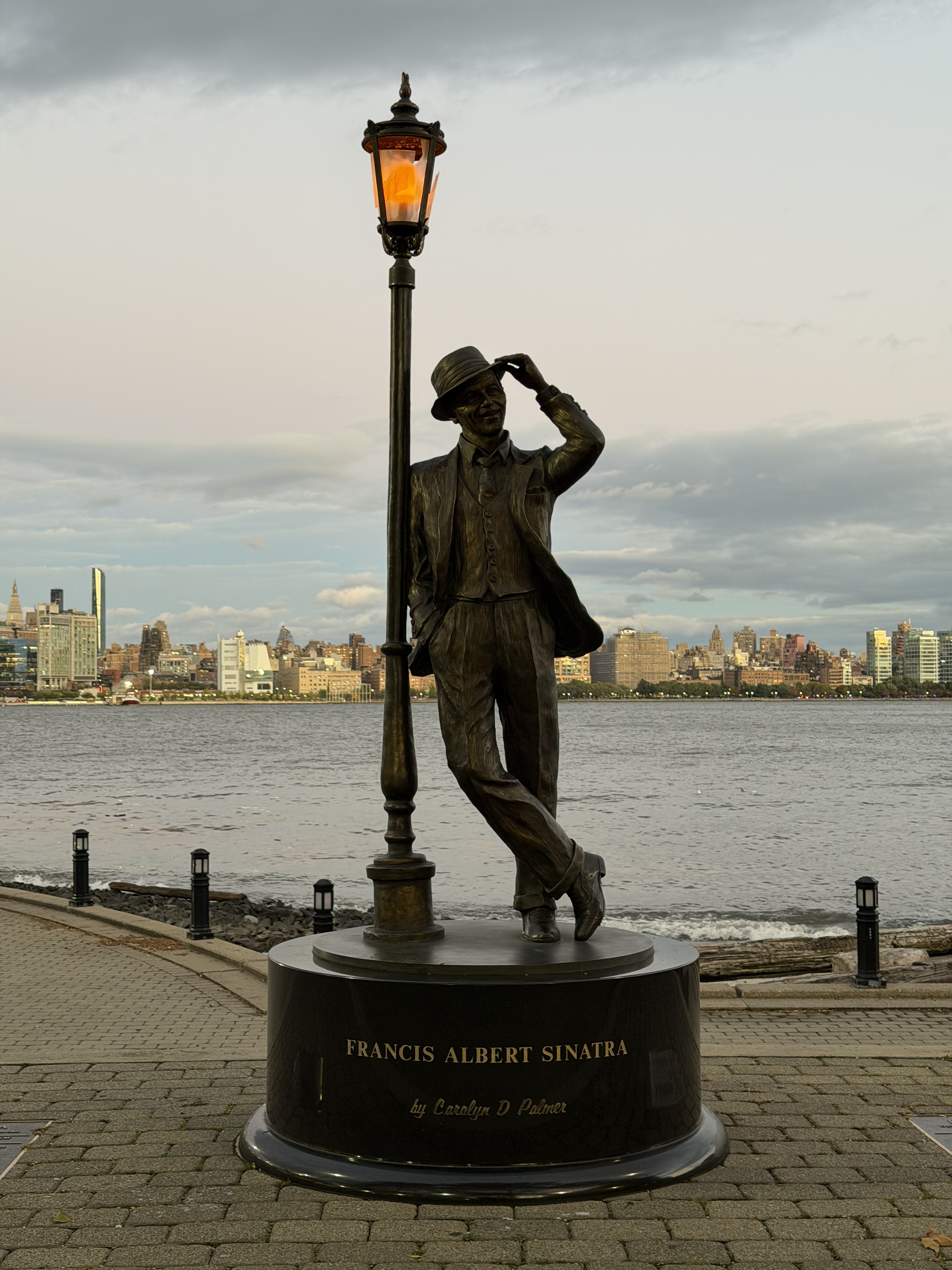
- The sculpture in 2025
- Artist: Carolyn D. Palmer
- Year: 2021
- Subject: Frank Sinatra
- Dimensions: 9 ft (2.7 m) (height)
- Location: Hoboken, New Jersey, U.S.; 40°44′29″N 74°01′34″W

The statue of Frank Sinatra in Hoboken, New Jersey is located along Sinatra Park section of the Hudson River Waterfront Walkway.

== Statue ==
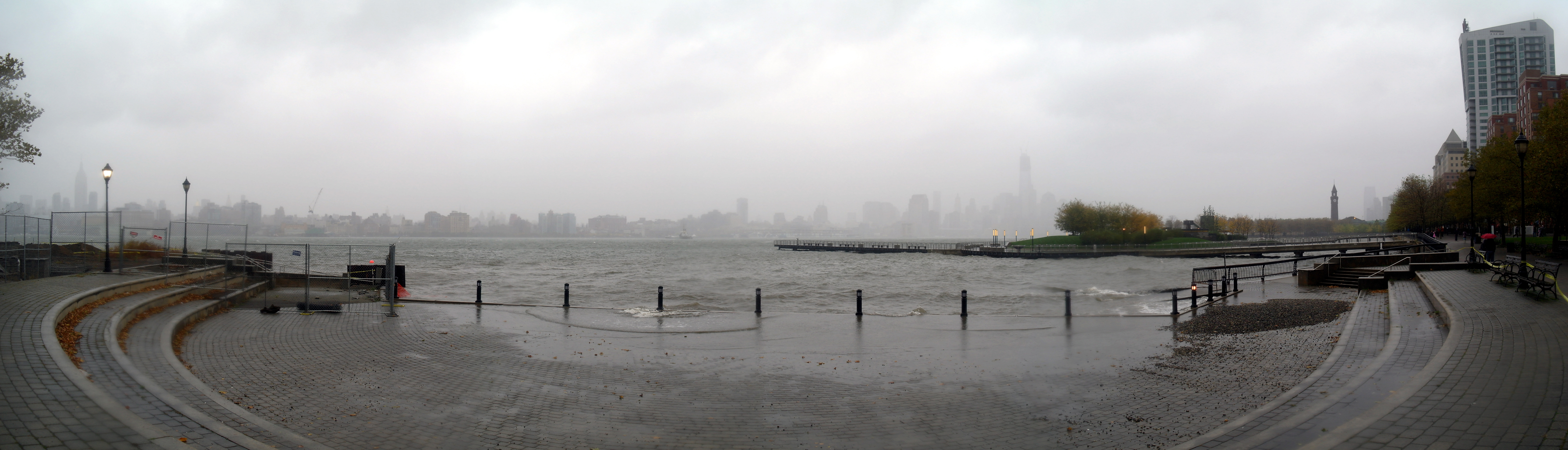
Sinatra Park Amphitheater

The 6-foot (1.8 m) tall bronze work sits atop a round pedestal inscribed with Francis Albert Sinatra. It depicts Sinatra at the age of 45 leaning against a lamppost and tipping his hat. It was created by Carolyn D. Palmer and dedicated in 2021 on December 12, the date of Sinatra's birth in 1915. In attendance were the sculptor, Tina Sinatra, Joe Piscopo, and Mayor of Hoboken Ravinder Bhalla. A plaque placed by the city in 1989 is also located in the park.

== Significance ==
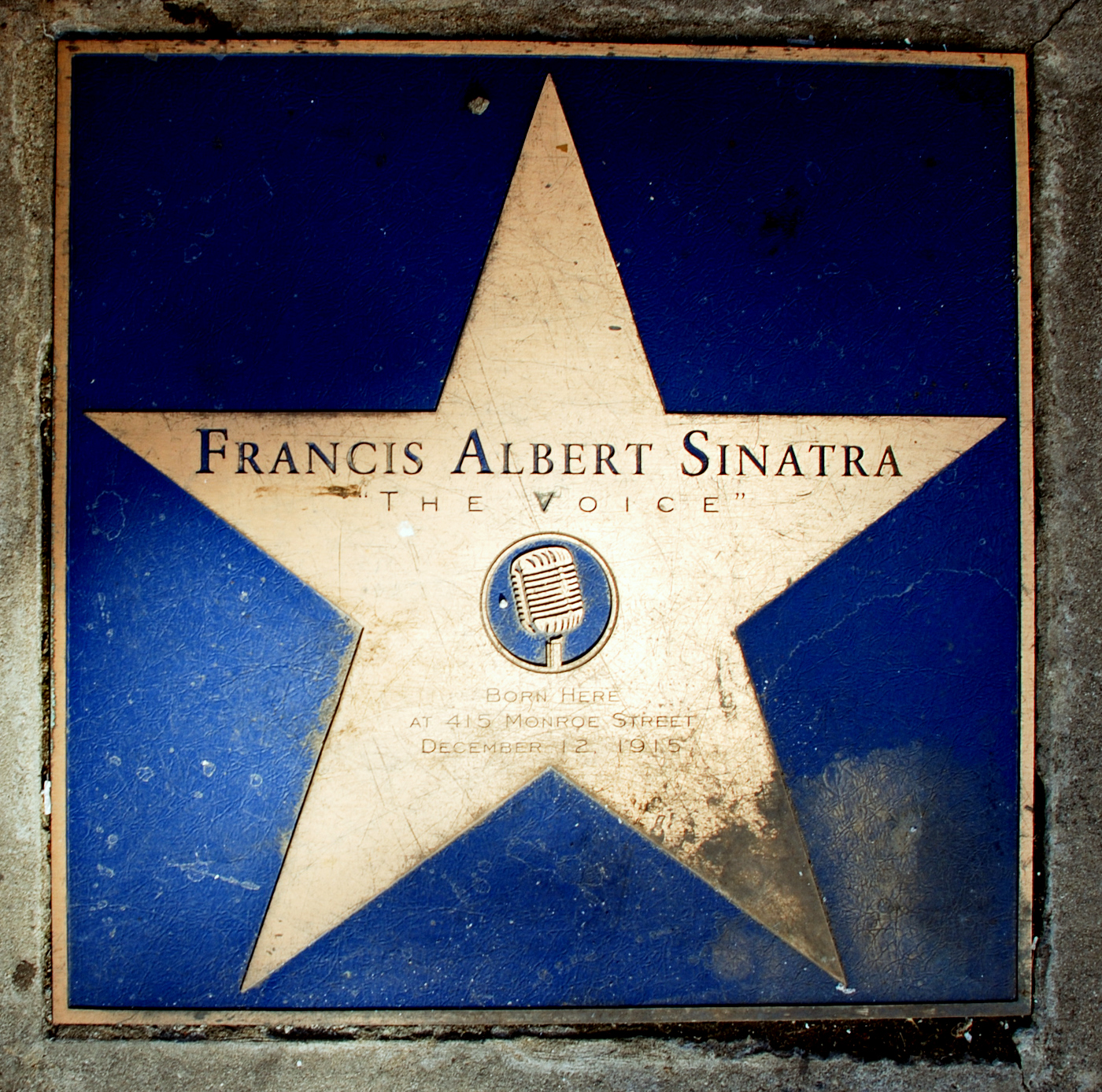

Sinatra's early life was spent in Hoboken, where he was born and raised. He was awarded the Key to the City by Mayor Fred M. De Sapio on October 30, 1947. In 2003 the city's main post office was designated the Frank Sinatra Post Office Building.

A bronze plaque, placed two years before Sinatra’s death in 1998, marks the site of the house where he was born. There is also a commemorative marker in front of Hoboken Historical Museum, which has artifacts from his life and conducts Sinatra walking tours through the city.

== See also ==
- List of public art in Jersey City, New Jersey
- Statue of Lucille Ball
