= QXT's Nightclub =

Live performance club in Mulberry, Newark, New Jersey

- Q's, QXT
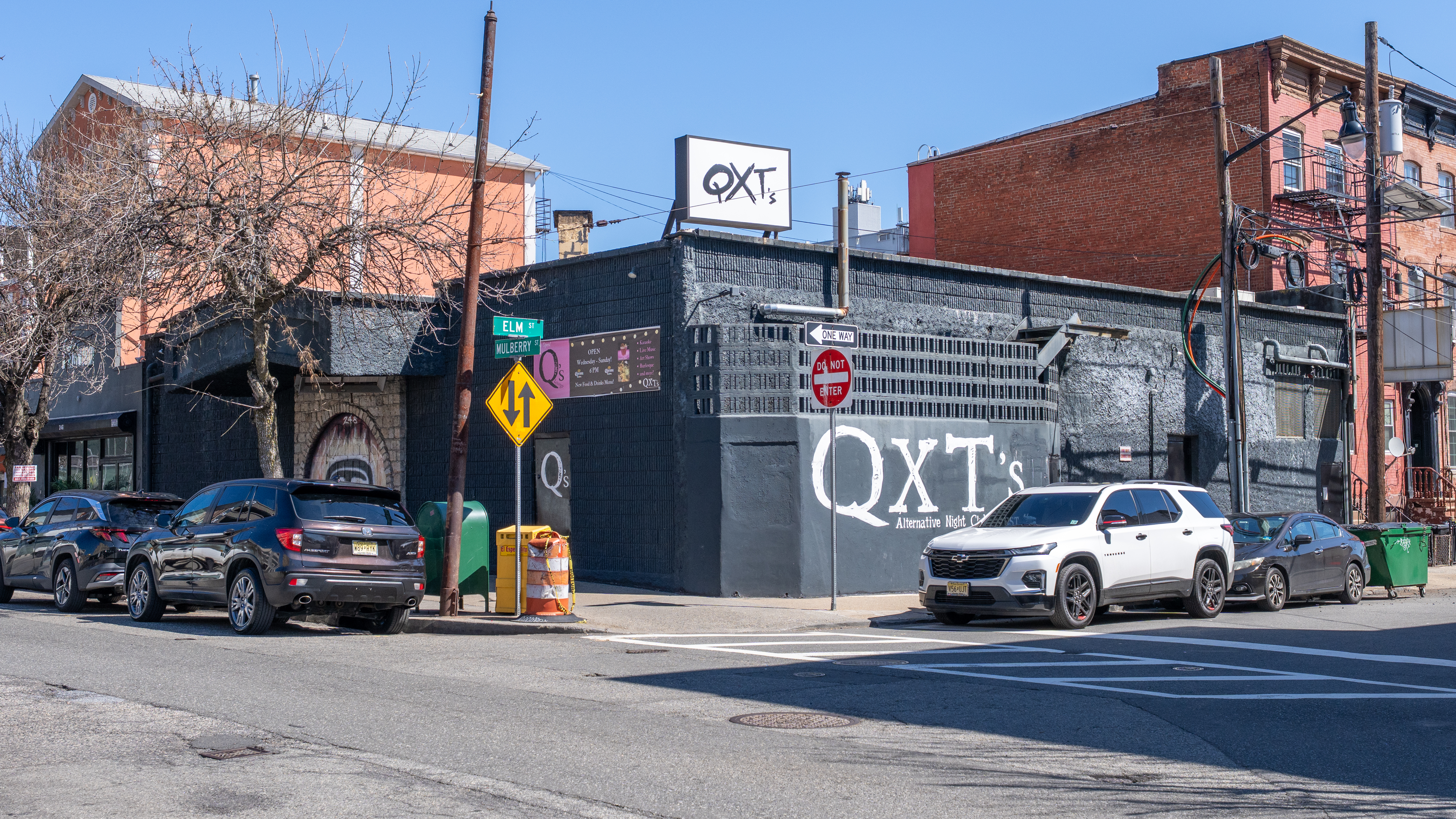
- QXT's front doors in the daytime (2026)
- Interactive map of QXT's Nightclub
- Address: 248 Mulberry Street; Newark, New Jersey, US
- Location: Corner of Elm and Mulberry, two blocks south of the Prudential Center near the western edge of the Ironbound section.
- Coordinates: 40°43′49.3″N 74°10′17.2″W
- Owner: Rolando Manna
- Type: Music venue, dance club, goth club
- Events: Goth, alternative dance

Construction
- Opened: 1991

Website
- www.qxtsnightclub.com

QXT's Nightclub is a live music and dance club on Mulberry Street in Newark, New Jersey catering mainly to a goth clientele.

== Background ==
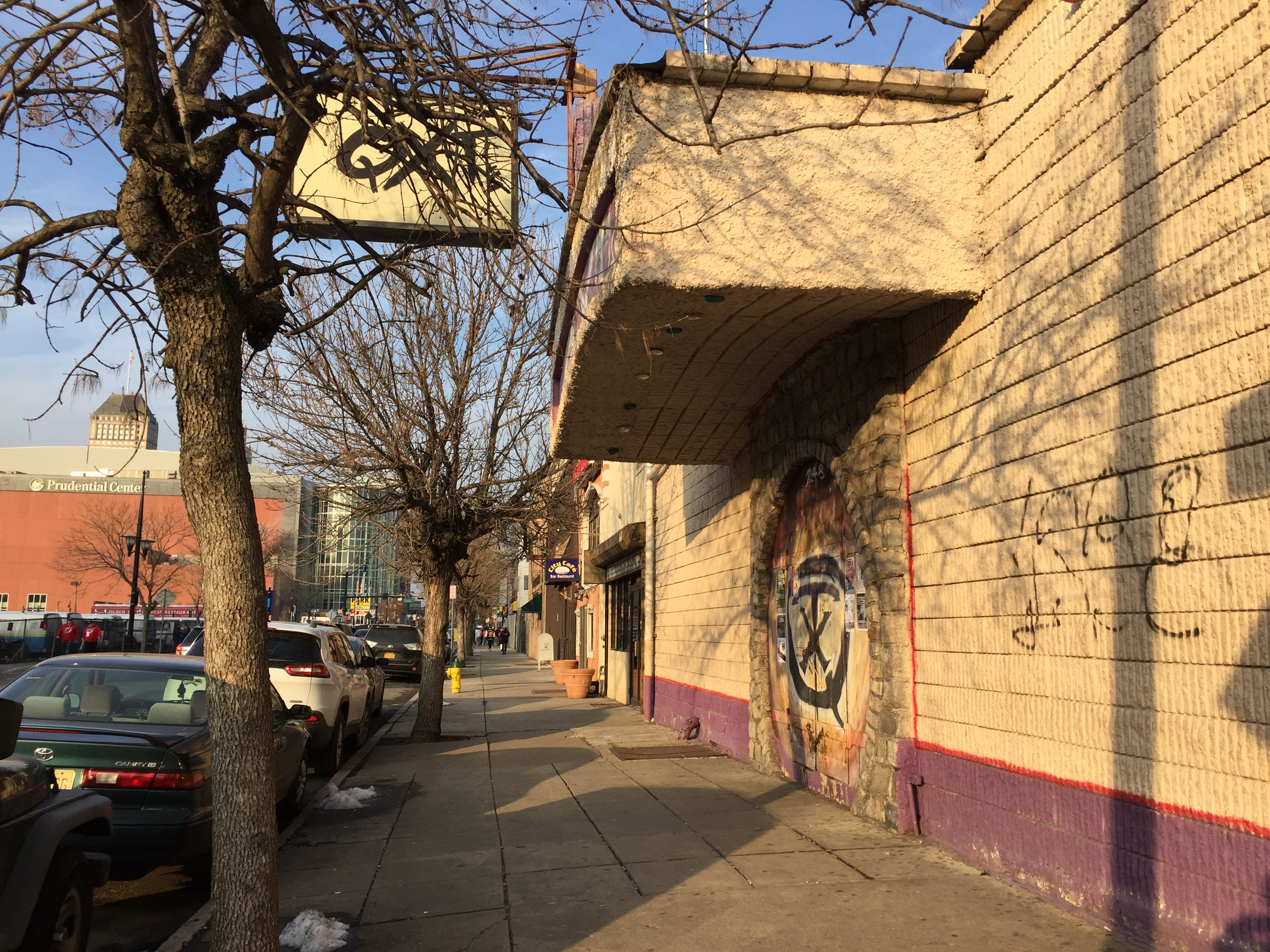
QXT's in 2016

The venue opened as a nightclub in 1991. Formerly the Quixote restaurant from which it gets its initialed name, the venue was built in the style of a Spanish castle in the 1970s. Prior to that, at midcentury, the address housed the Capitol Restaurant. The goth subculture began to predominate at the venue in the 2000s.

The goth club is located in the heart of what was once Newark's Chinatown beginning in the 1890s. It sits in the area of the city between City Hall and the Ironbound. It is host to shows by live punk, goth, and hardcore bands and DJs as well as burlesque acts and a number of film shoots. Terrifier 2, The Trial of the Chicago 7 and others were filmed on location in the club.

== See also ==
- The Melody
- WSOU
- The Aquarian Weekly
- Halsey Street
- Jersey club music
- Newark Paramount Theater
- The Cathedral Basilica of the Sacred Heart
- New Jersey music venues by capacity
