= Wang Ling =

Wang Ling may refer to:

- Wang Ling (Three Kingdoms) (172–251), nephew of Wang Yun, general of Cao Wei during the Three Kingdoms period
- Wang Ling (Qin general), general of the Qin state in the Warring States period of Chinese history
- Wang Ling (Han dynasty), Han dynasty general
- Wang A. Ling, original name of Tom Lee (gang leader) (c. 1837–1918), American gang leader of New York City
- Wang Ling (historian) (1917–1994), Chinese historian known for his collaboration with Joseph Needham
- Wang Ling (basketball) (born 1978), female Chinese basketball player

== See also ==
- Lin Wang (1917–2003), Asian elephant
