= Frank Moss (lawyer) =

American political activist and social reformer

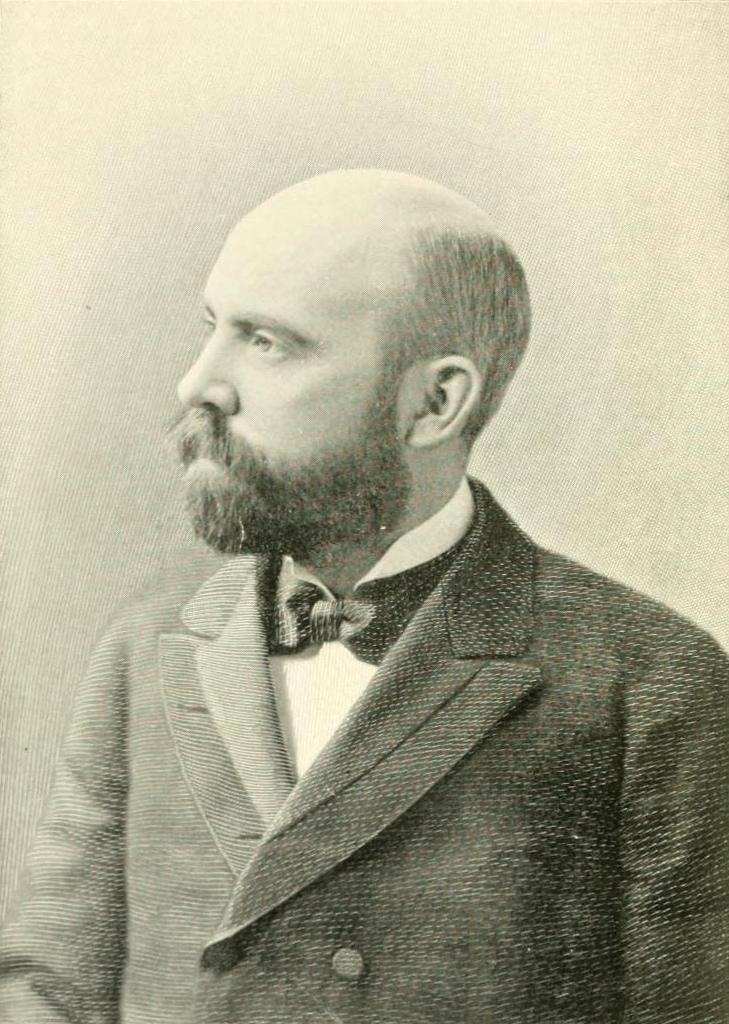
- Born: March 16, 1860; Cold Spring, New York, United States
- Died: June 5, 1920 (aged 60); Manhattan, New York, US
- Education: New York City College
- Occupation: Attorney
- Known for: Political activist and social reformer who served as assistant to District Attorney Charles S. Whitman during the Rosenthal murder trial
- Political party: Republican
- Spouse: Elva E. Bruce
- Children: 2

Signature
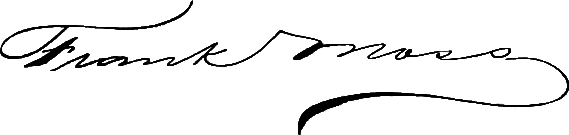

Frank Moss (March 16, 1860 – June 5, 1920) was an American lawyer, reformer and author. He was involved in many of the reform movements in New York City shortly before the start of the 20th century up until his death. As a longtime assistant to District Attorney Charles S. Whitman, he was involved in several high-profile criminal cases such as the Rosenthal murder trial in which police detective Charles Becker was found guilty of murder and executed.

== Biography ==
Frank Moss was born in Cold Spring, New York in 1860 and moved to New York City as a child. Attending New York City College, he became involved in "vice crusades" and other reform movements while studying to pass the bar. Early in his legal career, he held important positions such as president of the City Vigilance League and president of the Society for the Prevention of Crime. He was also a member of the Union League Club and Republican Club.

While council for Dr. Charles H. Parkhurst, Moss helped police in closing down gambling dens belonging to the On Leong Tong in Chinatown. Much of the information was supplied by Mock Duck, a rival underworld figure of Tom Lee and the On Leongs, and who quickly assumed control of these establishments after they were closed. In appreciation, Mock Duck replaced the traditional joss in the Hip Sing Tong House with a crayon portrait of Moss.

Moss first came to prominence during the Lexow and Mazet investigations, as an associate and chief council respectively, where he established himself as an aggressive prosecutor and investigator. While cross-examining Tammany Hall leader Richard Croker during the Mazet inquiry, Moss was able to provoke him into stating the now famous statement admitting his corruption: "I am working for my pocket all the time, just like you, Mr. Moss".

In 1897, he succeeded Theodore Roosevelt as president of the Board of Police Commissioners. In 1901, during Seth Low and William Travers Jerome's campaign against the city's red light districts, Moss famously addressed the court in a speech blaming Croker for the existence of white slavery and forced prostitution. He and Jerome became close friends after the trial, Moss working tirelessly on the case to the point of exhaustion, however the two would later have a falling out when the two noted attorneys faced each other during the trial of John M. Wisker in 1902.

In the fall of 1909, Moss was unexpectedly chosen by District Attorney Charles S. Whitman to become his first assistant. Although Moss was a Republican, he was not a particular favorite of machine politics and Herbert Parsons, political boss of New York County, was reportedly displeased with his appointment. While under Whitman, Moss successfully prosecuted the four members of the Lenox Avenue Gang accused of murdering gambler Herman Rosenthal. It was partly on evidence gained at this trial that he was able to greatly assist Whitman in proving that police detective Charles Becker hired the four gunmen to kill Rosenthal resulting in his conviction and execution.

A devout churchgoer, Moss was an active member of the congregation of St. James Methodist Episcopal Church. He served on the board of directors for the New York Church Extension Society for a number of years and his son, Reverend Arthur Moss, was on the Board of Foreign Missions of the Methodist Church. In November 1919, Moss underwent surgery at Roosevelt Hospital and suffered a relapse four months later from which he would never fully recover. In poor health for the last few months of his life, he died of heart disease at his East 127th Street home on the night of June 5, 1920.

He and his wife Elva E. Bruce had two children, Arthur and Elizabeth Moss.

== Bibliography ==
- Moss, Frank. The American Metropolis from Knickerbocker Days to the Present Time (3 vols.). New York and London: The Authors' Syndicate, 1897.
