= Sai Wing Mock =

Chinese-American criminal (1879–1941)

Sai Wing Mock (麦世荣) "Mock Duck" (麥德)
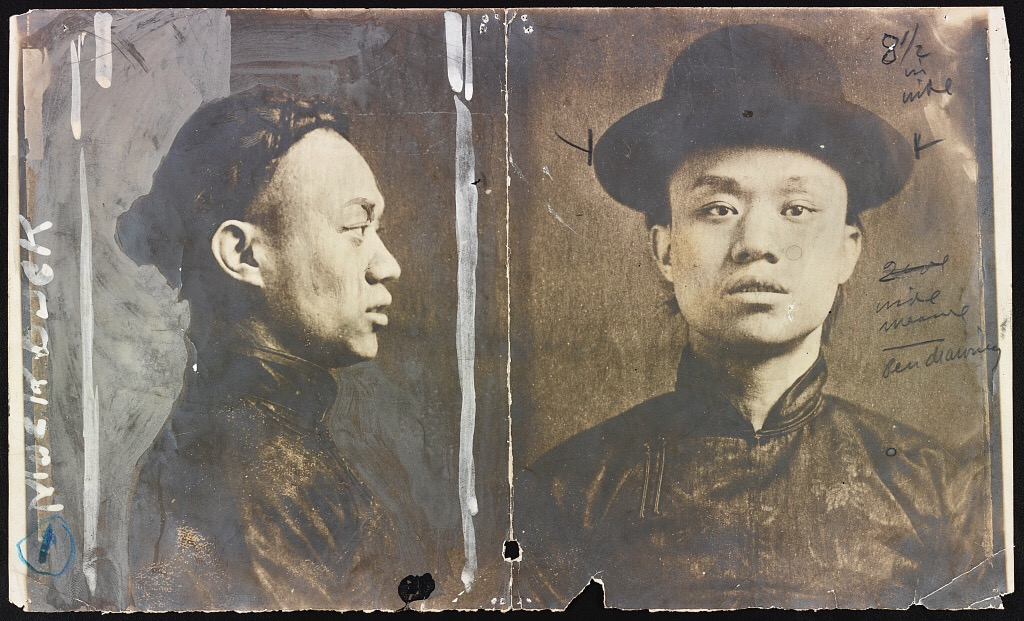
- Early New York City Police Department mugshot of Chinese criminal Tong leader Mock Duck, before going to Sing Sing Penitentiary, 1912
- Born: 1879; San Francisco, California, United States
- Died: 23 July 1941 (age 62); Chinatown, Manhattan, New York City, United States
- Other name: Mark Tuck
- Occupation: Criminal gang leader
- Known for: Being top New York City Chinese Tong gang leader from late 19th-mid 20th century
- Spouse: Tai Yow Chin

Sai Wing Mock
- Traditional Chinese: 麥世榮
- Simplified Chinese: 麦世荣
Transcriptions
Standard Mandarin
- Hanyu Pinyin: Mài Shìróng
Yue: Cantonese
- Yale Romanization: Mahk Sai-wìhng
- Jyutping: Mak^{6} Sai^{3}-wing^{4}

Mock Duck
- Traditional Chinese: 麥德
- Simplified Chinese: 麦德
Transcriptions
Standard Mandarin
- Hanyu Pinyin: Mài Dé
Yue: Cantonese
- Yale Romanization: Mahk Dāk
- Jyutping: Mak^{6} Dak^{1}

Sai Wing Mock (aka Mock Duck) (1879 – 23 July 1941) was a Chinese-American criminal and leader of the Hip Sing Tong, which replaced the On Leong Tong as the dominant Chinese-American Tong in Manhattan Chinatown in the early 1900s.

== Early life ==
Mock was born in the Chinatown area of San Francisco, to Chinese immigrants from Guangdong. Mock's birthyear is typically given as 1878, while his gravestone gives the year 1879. His family's clan, described as "small but influential", was not part of the Six Companies, the largest of the overseas Chinese associations in North America at the time, and as a result, the Mock family were reportedly ostracized by them. Criminologist Jeffrey McIllwain suggested that Mock was possibly related to Mock Wah, a merchant tong leader of the early immigration influx in 1854 during the California gold rush, and Mock Wing, who led the San Francisco Hip Sing Association, which was a communal organization at the time, in 1871. In accordance with Chinese naming, Mock was originally known as Mock Sai Wing, and as a child, he attended a mission school to learn how to read and write English.

== Criminal career ==
In the spring of 1899, Mock, aged 18 or 20, moved to the Manhattan Chinatown of New York City, where the Hip Sing Tong had recently established a headquarters on 10 Pell Street, under leader Lang Yue. Mock already had a good reputation with New York's Hip Sing Tong branch and was known for his wealth and his skill at gambling. He moved into a communal tenement on 19 Pell Street, where fellow Chinese newcomers to the city gave Mock the nickname "Duck", a Cantonese romanization of the Chinese character for "righteousness".

On 12 August 1900, amidst increased unrest between rivalling tongs since the fall of 1899, a quarrel between five Chinese residents on Pell Street led to the shooting death of Chih Kung Tong member Lung Kin by Hip Sing Tong member Goo Wing Chung. All five involved were armed with firearms, blades or blunt weapons, and Goo alleged that the victim attacked him first. Goo was convicted of Lung's murder primarily through the testimony of Ah Fe, a Chih Kung Tong member who was visiting from Newark. On 21 September 1900, during another visit to Pell Street, Ah Fe got into a shootout with Hip Sing Tong member Sue Sing, which led to the death of Ah Fe and the injury of two Italian passersby. While Ah Fe only identified Sue Sing as the perpetrator, Assistant District Attorney Francis W. Garvan claimed the involvement of two other Hip Sing Tong members, those being Mock Duck and Dong Sue.

Mock was arrested, but fled to Buffalo after posting bail. Mock's location was given away by Tom Lee, the unofficial "mayor" of Manhattan Chinatown and leader of the On Leong Tong, the main rivals of the Hip Sing Tong. Tom Lee, a close associate of the Tammany Hall, was shamed by the Chinese community, but maintained his reputation with the police, who had referred to Lee as "The Good Chinese" in newspaper mentions. Defended by four well-regarded lawyers, including social reformer Frank Moss, Mock's legal proceedings in 1901 and 1902 ended in two mistrials. During the same timeframe, Ton Bok Woo, President of the Hip Sing Tong, returned to China, being replaced by Huey Gow, who had Mock Duck and Wong Get, who was Mock's interpreter, act as his close advisors.

=== Chinatown kingpin ===
Under the new leadership, the Hip Sing Tong challenged the On Leong Tong's rule in Manhattan Chinatown. In one instance, when a Hip Sing Tong member was surrounded while visiting his cousin's home on On Leong Tong territory. Although the council had decided not to intervene, Mock Duck defused the situation by going to the scene alone, walking past the armed On Leong Tong soldiers and retrieving the Hip Sing Tong man without incident. The On Leong Tong subsequently placed a $1000 bounty for Mock's assassination. Mock Duck took advantage of the reform crusade started by Charles Parkhurst and posing as a Christian and legitimiate businessman, he supplied information on the On Leong criminal operations to Parkhurst and his Society for the Prevention of Crime, informing them of the On Leong Tong's illegal gambling operations and its bribery of local officials and politicians, also testifying against On Leong Tong members in court. Through supplied addresses, authorities raided On Leong opium dens and gambling houses on Pell and Doyers Streets. However, Mock Duck held back the addresses of the more lucrative Mott Street operations for leverage against Lee. Mock Duck also formed an alliance with the rival Four Brothers Tong.

In summer 1904, Mock Duck demanded half of Tom Lee's revenue from the On Leong Tong's illegal gambling operations. Lee and other high-ranking members rebuffed Mock and two weeks later, the On Leong Tong boarding house on Pell Street was set on fire, resulting in the deaths of two men. War was subsequently declared by both tongs. On 21 July of the same year, the Society for the Prevention of Crime launched a raid on six policy houses in On Leong territory, reportedly after being tipped off by a man named Wong, who was most likely Mock Duck's associate Wong Get. On 16 August, Tom Lee was arrested alongside William A. Hangs and Charles Foon Foos on counts of voting despite not being U.S. citizens. Lee had been naturalized in 1876, but his citizenship was revoked two years later after the 1878 landmark decision of In re Ah Yup. In fall of 1904, the Hip Sing Tong arranged for the transfer of Sing Dock, also known as "The Scientific Killer", to lead a group of gunmen to challenge the On Leong Tong in a pre-arranged gunfight, but no On Leong Tong members showed up to the agreed site. On 3 November 1904, after Sing Dock returned to San Francisco, Mock Duck was shot twice by On Leong gunman Lee Sing. One shot pierced Mock's stomach, while the second was deflected by his belt buckle.

One Chinatown historian describes Mock Duck in 1904 as "strutting around on Pell Street, covered in diamonds," adding that, at that time, "Mock Duck is firmly in control of the Hip Sing, his sinister image bolstered by his long, lethal-looking fingernails, which signal he is too grand to do the dirty work he assigns to others." Mock Duck was considered socially conservative even by contemporary standards, choosing to keep his queue hairstyle even after the 1911 Revolution that ended the Qing dynasty, though this was ultimately rooted in pragmatism, as Mock maintained that braided hair "encouraged the Occidental illusion that all Chinese look alike", thus confusing police in identifying individuals, noting that the braid could also be easily hidden under a hat if needed.

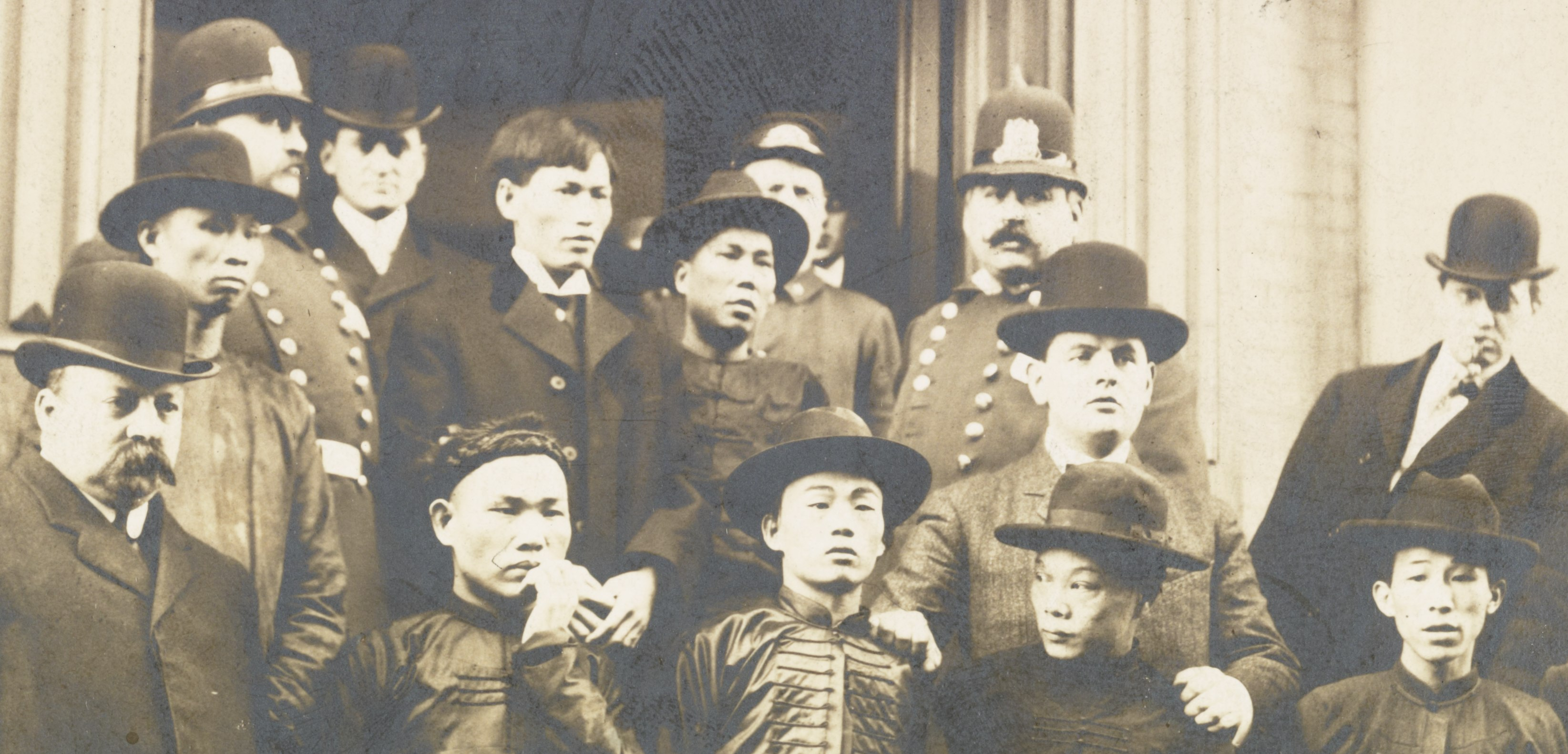
Chinese arrested after Mock Duck and Tom Lee factions' shooting in Chinatown on January 24, 1906

Mock Duck survived repeated attempts on his life, including in February 1932 at his establishment in Newark's Chinatown and wore a chain mail vest. He was named by the press the "Clay Pigeon of Chinatown" and the "Mayor of Chinatown". During several attempts on his life, Mock Duck reportedly squatted down in the street and fired at his attackers with two handguns with his eyes closed.

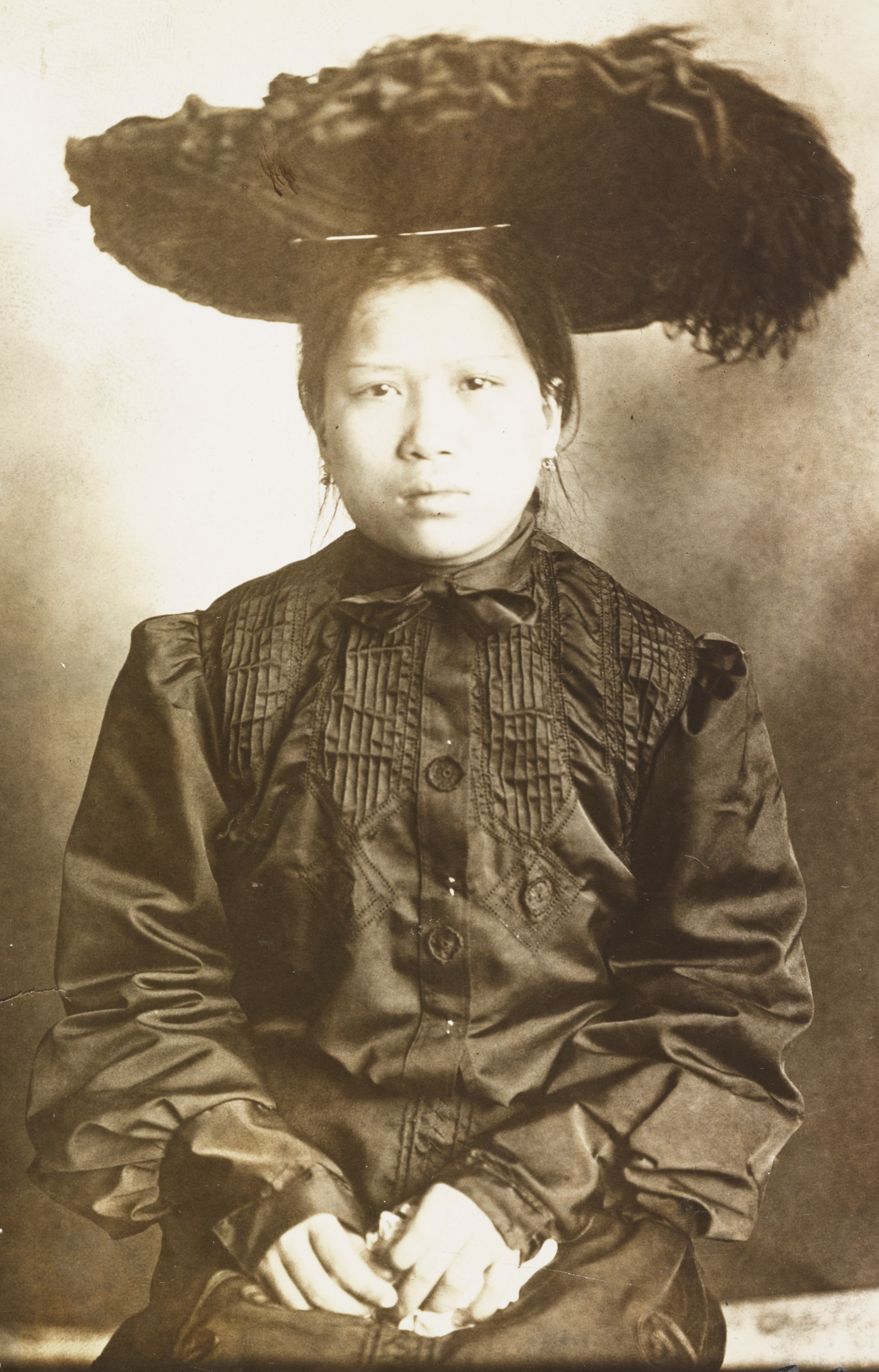
Tie You in March 1906, wife of Sai Wing Mock, leader of Hip Sing Tong organization in Chinatown, New York City

The warring Tongs signed a truce in 1906, but the Hip Sings and the On Leongs were again at war the following year. Mock Duck finally defeated Lee in the "Bow Kum" Tong war of 1909–1910. He was arrested several times during the next decade, during which time a number of attempts were made on his life. But he was convicted only once in 1912, for operating a policy game, and served two years of imprisonment in Sing Sing Prison.

== Retirement and death ==
Following his release, Mock Duck returned to using his original name, Mock Sai Wing. In 1932, Mock Duck agreed to an arrangement with the US and Chinese governments to declare a peace among the Tongs of Chinatown, and he retired to Brooklyn where he lived until his death on 23 July 1941.

== See also ==
- Bing Kong Tong
- Suey Sing Tong
- Hop Sing Tong
- Hui
- Tong Wars
- Triad (underground society)
- Tiandihui
- List of Chinese criminal organizations
- List of criminal enterprises, gangs and syndicates
