= Lucy Does a TV Commercial =

- I Love Lucy episode
- Episode no.: Season 1 Episode 30
- Directed by: Marc Daniels
- Written by: Jess Oppenheimer; Madelyn Pugh; Bob Carroll Jr.
- Production code: 130
- Original air date: May 5, 1952

Guest appearances
- Ross Elliott as The Director; Jerry Hausner as Joe; Maury Thompson as Script Clerk; Jess Oppenheimer as Sound Man (voice)

Episode chronology
| ← Previous "The Freezer" | Next → "The Publicity Agent" |

"Lucy Does a TV Commercial" is the 30th episode of the 1950s television sitcom I Love Lucy, airing on May 5, 1952. It is considered to be the most famous episode of the show. In 1997, TV Guide ranked it #2 on their list of the "100 Greatest Episodes of All Time". In 2009, they ranked it #4 on their list of "TV's Top 100 Episodes of All Time." The initial episode was watched by 68% of the television viewing audience at the time.

== Plot ==
Ricky is given an opportunity to host a television show and is notified that he needs to find a girl to do a commercial spot for one of their sponsors. Lucy begs Ricky to let her do the commercial, but he refuses. Lucy asks Fred to assist her in a scheme to get Ricky to watch her on television. When Ricky returns home from his band rehearsal, she is behind the TV screen – inside the set's empty body – doing a mock commercial as Johnny, the bellhop of Phillip Morris fame. Ricky, disliking the stunt, goes behind the set and plugs the cord back into its outlet, which electrically shocks Lucy and sets off a minor electrical flare-up behind her. Ricky discovers that she has taken each part of the television set out, piece by piece (rather than sliding the whole chassis frame out), so that she could fit inside.

The following morning, Lucy avoids Ricky. Ricky asks Fred if he can wait for a telephone call from the girl willing to do the commercial to tell her the time and studio. After Ricky leaves, Lucy tells Fred she will deliver the message instead. When the girl calls, Lucy tells her she is not needed for the commercial and proceeds to take her place.

The director of the commercial explains to Lucy their sales pitch regarding the "Vitameatavegamin" health tonic. What both Lucy and the director are unaware of – but what the propman realizes to his shock – is that the tonic contains 23% alcohol. Lucy begins her first rehearsal, taking a sip of the tonic, which tastes terrible, as evidenced by her grimace. After a few more practice runs, Lucy riddles her subsequent rehearsals with mistakes as she becomes further intoxicated from the tonic. The director asks the propman to take her to her dressing room to rest until the commercial goes live. When the television show begins, Ricky sings "El Relicario", but Lucy comes out from backstage and staggers toward Ricky. She sways, waves to the camera, starts singing along with Ricky, and repeats her sales pitch in the middle of his singing despite Ricky's attempts to keep her off-screen. When he is finished performing, Ricky desperately carries Lucy off the stage.

== Notes ==
- In later reruns, the scene where Lucy is in a broken television set was edited to remove references to Philip Morris, which was sponsoring I Love Lucy at the time. (The Public Health Cigarette Smoking Act banned tobacco advertisements from broadcast television beginning in 1971.) The DVD release, as well as the colorized episode, restore this, as well as the episode shown on Pluto TV.
- The Vitameatavegamin was originally 11% alcohol, but was increased to 23% on the show. The bottle from which Lucille Ball was at first pouring the tonic, and later drinking from directly, actually contained apple pectin.
- Ethel (Vivian Vance) is absent from this episode; Fred says that she is visiting her mother.
- The central sketch was originally created by Red Skelton and had been part of his vaudeville routine since the 1930s. Skelton granted Ball permission to use it in I Love Lucy.
- As of 2017, the dress Ball wore during the rehearsal scene is owned by actress Laura Dern.

== Enduring popularity ==
The word "Vitameatavegamin" has since become a shorthand for this episode and for the I Love Lucy show in general.

The 1991 CBS television movie Lucy & Desi: Before the Laughter recreated this episode.

In 2009, a statue of Lucille Ball was installed in Lucille Ball Memorial Park in Ball's hometown of Celoron, New York, depicting the scene from this episode in which Ball's character hawks the alcohol-rich patent medicine Vitameatavegamin while under the effects of heavy dosage of the tonic. The statue was deemed "scary" by residents, earning it the nickname "Scary Lucy". In 2016, the statue was moved nearby and replaced by one created by Carolyn Palmer. The new sculpture, which depicts Ball standing on a copy of her Hollywood star, is known officially as "New Lucy" and colloquially as "Lovely Lucy".

In 2011, more than 900 Lucille Ball lookalikes gathered under a "Vitameatavegamin" sign to honor Ball's 100th birthday, setting a world record for the most Lucy lookalikes in one place.

Also in 2011, a talking Lucy doll was produced which recites lines from this episode.

In the April 9, 2020 episode of Will & Grace, Debra Messing recreated the scene.

== See also ==
- Lucille Ball (2009 statue)
- "Dinner for One"
- List of I Love Lucy episodes
