= The Folk Project =

The Folk Project of New Jersey is a not-for-profit folk music, storytelling and dance organization which sponsors or organizes a wide variety of folk activities in the Northern New Jersey area.

The Folk Project was founded in the early 1970s as Project 21, organized by musician Laurie Riley. Since its incorporation in 1976, the Folk Project has promoted folk music through activities including the weekly Troubadour Acoustic Concert Series in Morristown; the Swingin’ Tern contra dance; twice-yearly folk festivals held at a camp in the woods of northwest New Jersey, monthly music parties held in members' homes, occasional special concerts, the New Jersey Storytelling Festival, and the cable TV show "...Horses Sing None of it!" The group celebrated its 40th anniversary in 2015, with a concert featuring Tom Paxton.

Local, national and international artists have been featured at Folk Project events, including the Tannahill Weavers, Richard Shindell, Bob Franke, Odetta, Christine Lavin, Jean Ritchie, Roy Book Binder, Dave Van Ronk, and Utah Phillips.
