= TV Guide's 100 Greatest Episodes of All Time =

List of greatest TV episodes

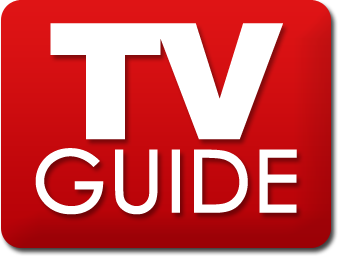

100 Greatest Episodes of All Time (1997) and Top 100 Episodes of All Time (2009) are lists of the 100 "best" television show episodes on U.S. television as published by TV Guide. The first list, published on June 28, 1997, was produced in collaboration with Nick at Nite's TV Land. The revised list was published on June 15, 2009. Both lists exclude game shows and variety shows, but include situation comedies and drama series.

== History and differences ==
About 25 shows from the original list were featured during a special week on Nick at Night on Nickelodeon and TV Land. On the original list several shows, including I Love Lucy, The Mary Tyler Moore Show, The Dick Van Dyke Show, Seinfeld, Cheers, and The Odd Couple had multiple entries, but none did on the 2009 list. The original list included 35 episodes from the 1950s and 1960s, while the 2009 list only included 10. Over one-third of the new list first aired in the twelve years since the original list, including 14 from the most recent two years. The June 2009 list included episodes as recent as the April 12, 2009, "Peekaboo" episode of Breaking Bad and the April 7, 2009, "Baptism" episode of Rescue Me, while the 1997 list included a two-month-old episode of The X-Files.

CBS was the original broadcaster of 35 of the 1997 list members, including both of the top two: "Chuckles Bites the Dust" of The Mary Tyler Moore Show and "Lucy Does a TV Commercial" from I Love Lucy. Several television series were represented by a different episode in 2009 than they were in 1997. The 2009 top rated show was "The Contest" from Seinfeld although in 1997 the show had been represented by "The Boyfriend" (number four) and "The Parking Garage" (number 33), instead of "The Contest". Three of the top 10 1997 episodes were removed although the series continued to be represented by other episodes: "The $99,000 Answer" (number 6) from The Honeymooners, "Thanksgiving Orphans" (number 7) from Cheers; and "Coast-to-Coast Big Mouth" (number 8) from The Dick Van Dyke Show.

The 1997 list included detailed show descriptions for all episodes, while only a select few were accompanied by more than a single sentence in the ascending order 2009 list. Only one of the thirteen contributors to the 2009 list was involved in the 1997 list.

== Top 10 ==
1997 list

1. The Mary Tyler Moore Show—"Chuckles Bites the Dust"
2. I Love Lucy—"Lucy Does a TV Commercial"
3. ER—"Love's Labor Lost"
4. Seinfeld—"The Boyfriend"
5. The Odd Couple—"Password"
6. The Honeymooners—"The $99,000 Answer"
7. Cheers—"Thanksgiving Orphans"
8. The Dick Van Dyke Show—"Coast to Coast Big Mouth"
9. The Bob Newhart Show—"Over the River and Through the Woods"
10. The X-Files—"Clyde Bruckman's Final Repose"

2009 list

1. Seinfeld—"The Contest"
2. The Sopranos—"College"
3. The Mary Tyler Moore Show—"Chuckles Bites the Dust"
4. I Love Lucy—"Lucy Does a TV Commercial"
5. Lost—"Pilot"
6. ER—"Love's Labor Lost"
7. The Honeymooners—"Better Living Through TV"
8. Mad Men—"Nixon vs. Kennedy"
9. All in the Family—"Cousin Maude's Visit"
10. 24—"Day 1: 11:00 p.m.–12:00 a.m."

== Reception ==
Paley Center for Media's James Sheridan regretted the recency bias of the newer list. Hal Boedeker of the Orlando Sentinel viewed the original list as a triumphant result despite its conflict of interest. The original list was derided for omitting Bonanza and The Golden Girls entirely. Daily News' David Bianculli was critical of the original list, saying that many selections would not be on a more legitimate top-100 list. He claimed that episodes chosen from Murder One, The Partridge Family, The Love Boat, and Speed Racer reveal a lack of either maturity or perspective, while others showed taste and bravery. Chicago Tribune critic Steve Johnson complained that it was premature to claim that any episode of ER had established sufficient cultural significance to rank third on the original list. Jaime Weinman of Maclean's complained that the 2009 list was composed of the most well-known episode of famous series, claiming that they were largely unexceptional episodes. He preferred the 1997 list, which he said was produced when TV Guide was a higher caliber publication.

== See also ==
- TV Guide's 50 Greatest TV Shows of All Time
