= Carolyn D. Palmer =

American sculptor

- Born: Chester, New York, U.S.
- Education: Nazareth College (BA)
- Known for: Sculpture
- Notable work: Statue of Lucille Ball (Celoron, NY); Statue of Frank Sinatra (Hoboken, NJ); Papal Busts (St. Patrick's Cathedral NYC); Franklin and Eleanor Roosevelt (FDR Library and Museum)
- Movement: Classical Realism
- Website: https://www.palmersculptures.com

Carolyn D. Palmer is an American sculptor known for large-scale bronze public monuments depicting historical and cultural figures. She gained national attention in 2016 after being selected from a national competition to create a replacement statue of Lucille Ball in Celoron, New York, following widespread criticism of an earlier version by sculptor, Dave Poulin. Her commissions include monuments to Frank Sinatra in Hoboken, New Jersey, four papal busts permanently installed at the entrances to St. Patrick’s Cathedral in New York City, and sculptures of Franklin D. Roosevelt and Eleanor Roosevelt at the entrance to the Franklin D. Roosevelt Presidential Library and Museum in Hyde Park, New York.

== Early life and education ==
Palmer was born and raised in Chester, New York. During her youth, she primarily focused on painting and drawing, though she also practiced sculpting informally. She attended John S. Burke Catholic High School in Goshen, New York, where she was awarded the art medal upon her graduation. In 2017, Palmer was inducted into the John S Burke High School Hall of Fame.

Palmer initially enrolled at Wells College in Aurora, NY, to study the sciences with the intention of pursuing a career in medical illustration and medicine. During a summer break from college, Palmer studied the collections of The Louvre and the Musée d’Orsay in Paris. She was influenced by the works of 18th- and 19th-century French sculptors Jean-Antoine Houdon and Jean-Baptiste Carpeaux. Following her exposure to European sculpture, she transferred to Nazareth College in Rochester, New York, where she graduated cum laude with a Bachelor of Science degree and a concentration in art education.

Although largely autodidactic in the technical application of bronze sculpture, Palmer developed her style through private study of the Old Masters.

== Career ==
Palmer initially began her professional career as a portrait painter and art educator before moving on to sculpture. Her first major sculpture commission was a larger-than-life-size bronze statue of Thomas Jefferson for the Jefferson Center in Syracuse, NY.

Palmer uses the traditional 6000-year-old lost-wax casting technique, in which a duplicate wax model is made from a mold taken from her original model to create a bronze casting.

=== Notable works ===
==== Lucille Ball (2016) ====
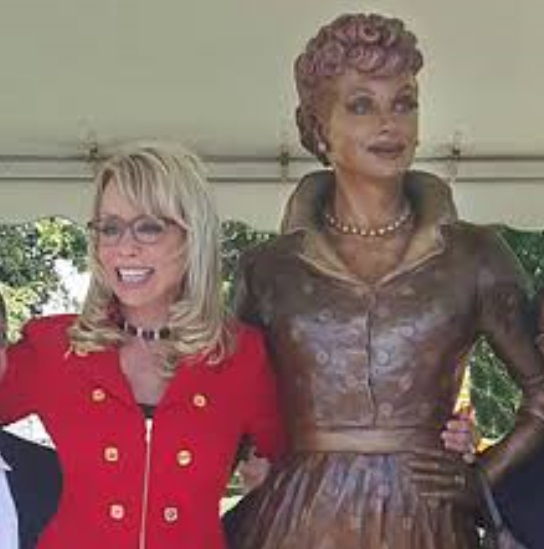
Palmer with the statue of Lucille Ball, 2019

In 2016, Palmer was selected from a national competition to create a replacement for a 2009 statue of Lucille Ball in Celoron, New York, sculpted by artist Dave Poulin, which had been widely criticized and nicknamed "Scary Lucy." The new 6-foot bronze depicts Ball in a 1950s-era polka-dot dress. It was inaugurated on 6 August 2016, during the Lucy Fest, with the earlier statue being moved to a different location in the same park.

==== Frank Sinatra (2021) ====
Palmer was commissioned by the city of Hoboken, New Jersey, to create a monument to hometown legend Frank Sinatra for his 106th birthday. The 6-foot bronze depicts Sinatra at age 45, leaning against a lamppost and wearing a fedora. The statue of Frank Sinatra is located in Sinatra Park along the Hudson River waterfront.

==== Papal and religious works ====
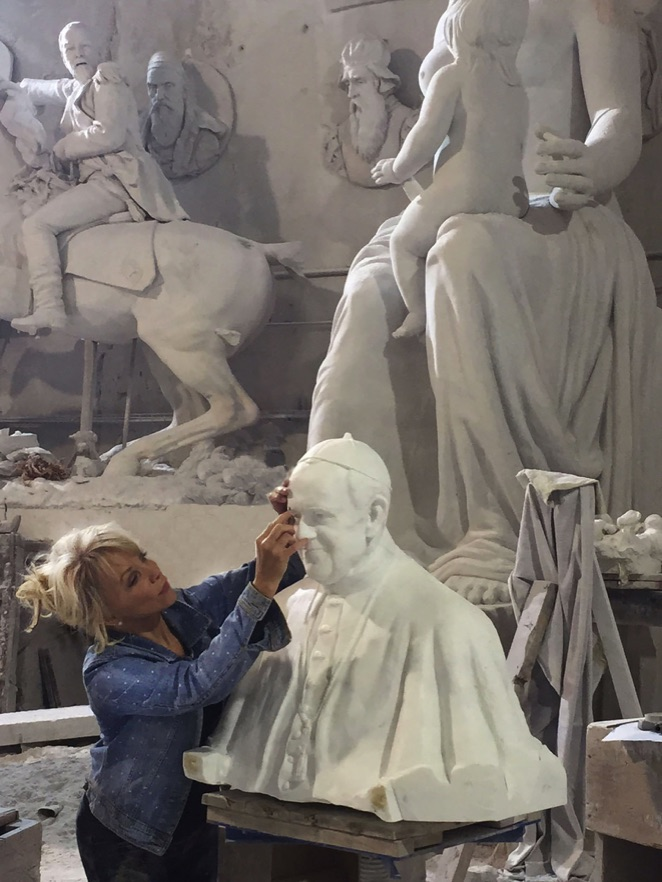
Palmer in Carrara, Italy, working on a Pope Francis for the Papal Residence in NYC

In 2018, four larger-than-life-size bronze papal busts created by Palmer were permanently installed in the Fifth Avenue entrance vestibules of St. Patrick's Cathedral. The busts depict Pope Paul VI, John Paul II, Benedict XVI, and Pope Francis. Palmer had previously created a marble bust of Pope Francis that was blessed by the pontiff during his 2015 visit to the United States.

==== Other major commissions ====
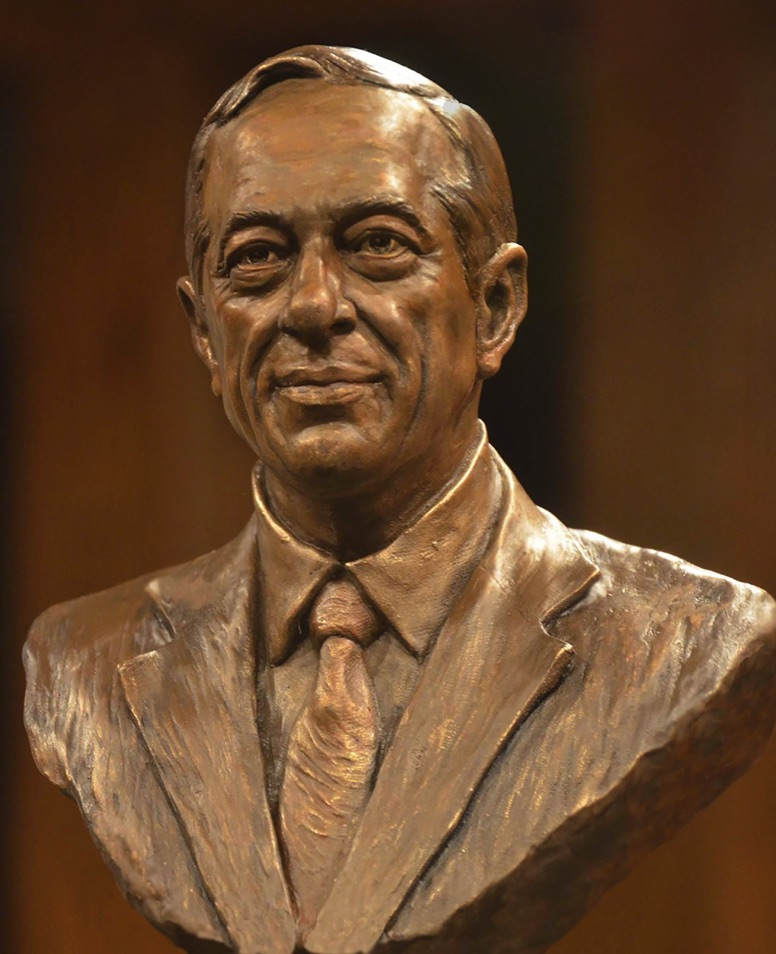
Bust of Mario Cuomo by Carolyn D. Palmer

Subject	Year	Location	Notes
Thomas Jefferson	2004	Syracuse, NY	One of her early bronze commissions
Franklin and Eleanor Roosevelt	2013	Hyde Park, NY	Permanent installation at the FDR Presidential Library and Museum entrance. A second set is in the Sara Delano Roosevelt Memorial House, now owned by Hunter College, and the third set is in the permanent collection of the New York Historical Museum in NYC. Palmer’s Roosevelt sculptures traveled in 2018 -2020 with the Norman Rockwell six-city international tour, Enduring Ideals: Rockwell, Roosevelt & the Four Freedoms.
Governor Mario Cuomo	2017		Commissioned by the National Italian American Foundation to create Governor Mario Cuomo bronze busts.
Sarah Loguen Fraser	2025	Syracuse, NY	Honoring one of the first African American woman physicians.
Elizabeth Blackwell	2025	Syracuse, NY	Honoring the first woman to receive a medical degree in the U.S.
Courtyard of the Founding Mothers	2025	Syracuse, NY	Palmer was selected from a national competition to create the two female doctors for the “Courtyard of the Founding Mothers” at SUNY Upstate Medical University.

== See also ==
- Public art
- Monumental sculpture
- Bronze sculpture
- Lost-wax casting
- Classical realism
- Statue
- List of public art in New York
