= Court Tavern =

The Court Tavern
- The Court; Veganica and SPACE Lounge at Court Tavern
- Interactive map of The Court Tavern
- Address: 124 Church Street New Brunswick, New Jersey, US
- Location: Corner of Church and Spring Streets
- Coordinates: 40°29′45″N 74°26′43″W
- Seating type: standing room
- Capacity: 185
- Type: Music venue, dive bar
- Events: Punk, hardcore, hip-hop and indie rock

Construction
- Opened: 1981
- Renovated: 2024 (as restaurant and bar)

The Court Tavern is a long-standing live music venue and bar located in New Brunswick, New Jersey. Home to local and national acts across all genres, including punk, hip-hop, indie, and hardcore, it temporarily stood closed at 124 Church Street between 2019 and 2024. The venue reopened as a 100% vegan restaurant, bar, and live music venue called Veganica and SPACE Lounge at Court Tavern in 2024.

== History and venue ==
In 1961, Bob Albert Sr. bought the Court Tavern, then at 149 Church Street with a partner. He told a reporter in 1977 that the bar dated to 1902, having operated illegally through the Prohibition era. In 1981, upon being forced to move on the building of a parking deck, the tavern moved across the street to its present location. From 1981 to 2012, the venue, run by Albert Sr. prior to his passing in 1997 alongside his son, Bobby Albert Jr., became a notable location for live music in New Brunswick.

The venue ran into financial trouble, and Patti Smith and her band as well as The Smithereens played a fundraiser for the venue in 2010 at the State Theatre. Bobby Albert Jr. closed the venue in 2012. It was purchased by Michael Barrood at a sheriff's auction in March 2012 and opened in November 2012 after completion of renovations. The club saw closures in 2015 and 2017 before closing indefinitely in 2019.

While DIY underground all-ages live music shows continued, no live rock music venues akin to the Court remained open in the city as of 2024. The Court Tavern was the last venue of its kind following the closure of other popular New Brunswick live indie and punk rock clubs of recent decades, such as the Melody Bar, the Roxy, the Budapest Cocktail Lounge, Patrix and Bowl-o-Drome.

In 2024, the venue reopened as a 100%-vegan establishment, Veganica at Court Tavern. The venue also offers a vegan "speakeasy" bar called SPACE Lounge and hosts nightly live music.

== Notable acts ==
Pavement delivered its first show at the Court, and the bar was home to touring acts like the Butthole Surfers, Mudhoney, Eugene Chadbourne, and The Jesus Lizard. During a tour stop in New Brunswick, The Replacements did an interview with MTV at the venue. The Flaming Lips, Sadat X of Brand Nubian, Ween, NJ Bloodline, X and Henry Rollins also played the venue.

A number of bands from New Brunswick got their start at the venue, the Smithereens considered it their home venue, and it was seminal according to a number of commentators on the New Brunswick, New Jersey music scene.

== See also ==
- The Melody
- WRSU
- New Jersey music venues by capacity
