= Better Living Through TV =

- The Honeymooners episode
- Episode no.: Episode 7
- Directed by: Frank Satenstein
- Written by: Marvin Marx; Walter Stone
- Cinematography by: Doug Downs
- Editing by: Leonard Anderson
- Original air date: November 12, 1955
- Running time: 30 minutes

Better Living Through TV is the seventh episode of the TV series The Honeymooners that aired November 12, 1955.

The 1950s were considered the golden age of advertising, with many brands sponsoring entire shows. Occasionally, the commercials became plotlines, as is the case in "Better Living Through TV", as Ralph and Norton do a commercial for a kitchen gadget Ralph wants to promote.

The episode was ranked #7 in TV Guide's ''Top 100 Episodes of All Time'' 2009 list.

== Synopsis ==
Ralph presents Norton with a money-making idea to get rich. There’s a box of labor saving devices - "Handy Housewife Helpers" - available from a warehouse. The device opens cans, takes corks out of bottles, cores apples, and many other things. Ralph's plan is to borrow money from their wives to buy the box and pay for a live TV commercial. It's a "sure thing".

Alice refuses to loan Ralph the money, so he borrows it elsewhere.

Ralph and Norton work out a commercial in which the "chef of the future" shares the wonders of the kitchen gadget that does everything and makes housewives happy. During the rehearsal, everything goes well, but as the show goes live, Ralph develops stage fright and freezes up, while Norton tries to save the commercial.

== Cast ==
- Jackie Gleason as Ralph Kramden
- Art Carney as Ed Norton
- Audrey Meadows as Alice Kramden
- Joyce Randolph as Trixie Norton
- Eddie Hanley as TV Director (uncredited)

== Reception ==
The episode was ranked #7 in TV Guide's ''Top 100 Episodes of All Time'' 2009 list.

The A.V. Club considers it one of the best episodes of The Honeymooners to watch.
