= Melody Bar =

The Melody
- The Melody
- Interactive map of The Melody
- Address: 106 French Street; New Brunswick, New Jersey, US
- Location: Between Plum and Prospect
- Coordinates: 40°29′37″N 74°27′4″W
- Type: Music venue, dance club
- Events: Alternative rock, goth, New Wave, electronic music, punk, post punk, house, hip-hop and emo

Construction
- Opened: March 1981; 45 years ago
- Closed: 2001; 25 years ago

The Melody Bar was a live music and dance club on French Street in the 1980s and 1990s in New Brunswick, New Jersey.

== Background ==
The venue, formerly a neighborhood bar serving the large midcentury New Brunswick Hungarian community, was opened in March 1981 by Cal Levine and Steve Flaks. The duo kept the name, Melody, after the daughter of the former Hungarian-American family owners.

The Melody rapidly became a hot spot for artists and musicians in the region. The music played and performed at the Melody Bar tended towards alternative rock, goth, punk, New Wave and post punk. DJs spun tracks by bands like The Smiths, The Cure, and Depeche Mode, as well as played genres like dance, house, electronica, and hip-hop on its small dance floor.

The venue drew individuals from the art and music communities in and outside of New Brunswick like Miles Hunt of the Wonder Stuff, Mick Jones of the Clash, and Beat Generation poet Gregory Corso. In its later years it served as a performance venue for post-hardcore and emo bands such as Thursday

MTV late-night alternative-music television presenter and local radio personality Matt Pinfield deejayed at the club prior to MTV, drawing packed crowds.

The Melody also exhibited and incorporated visual art from local artists from the city and Mason Gross and its walls became a local attraction. The venue closed without advance announcement in 2001.

== See also ==
- The Court Tavern
- Fluxus
- Bands from New Brunswick
- WRSU
- QXT's Nightclub
- New Jersey music venues by capacity
