= Early life of Frank Sinatra =

Frank Sinatra's life from 1915 to 1939

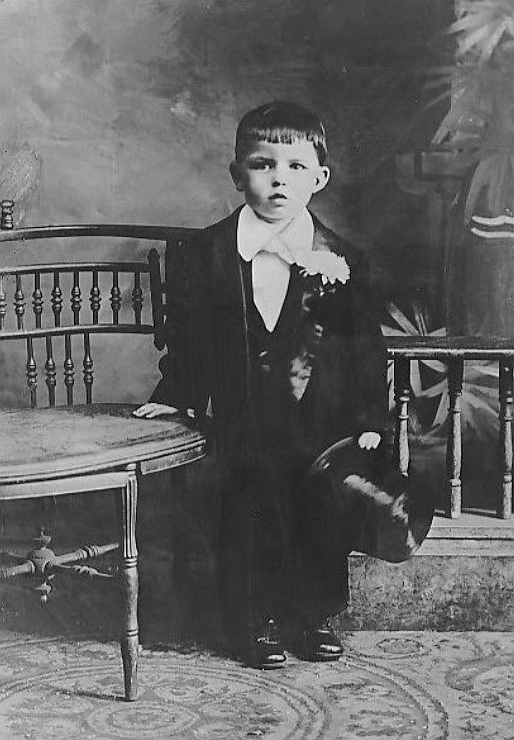
Sinatra at age three, c. 1918–19

Francis Albert Sinatra was born December 12, 1915, in Hoboken, New Jersey, and lived with his parents, who had emigrated from the Kingdom of Italy.

== Family background and early years ==
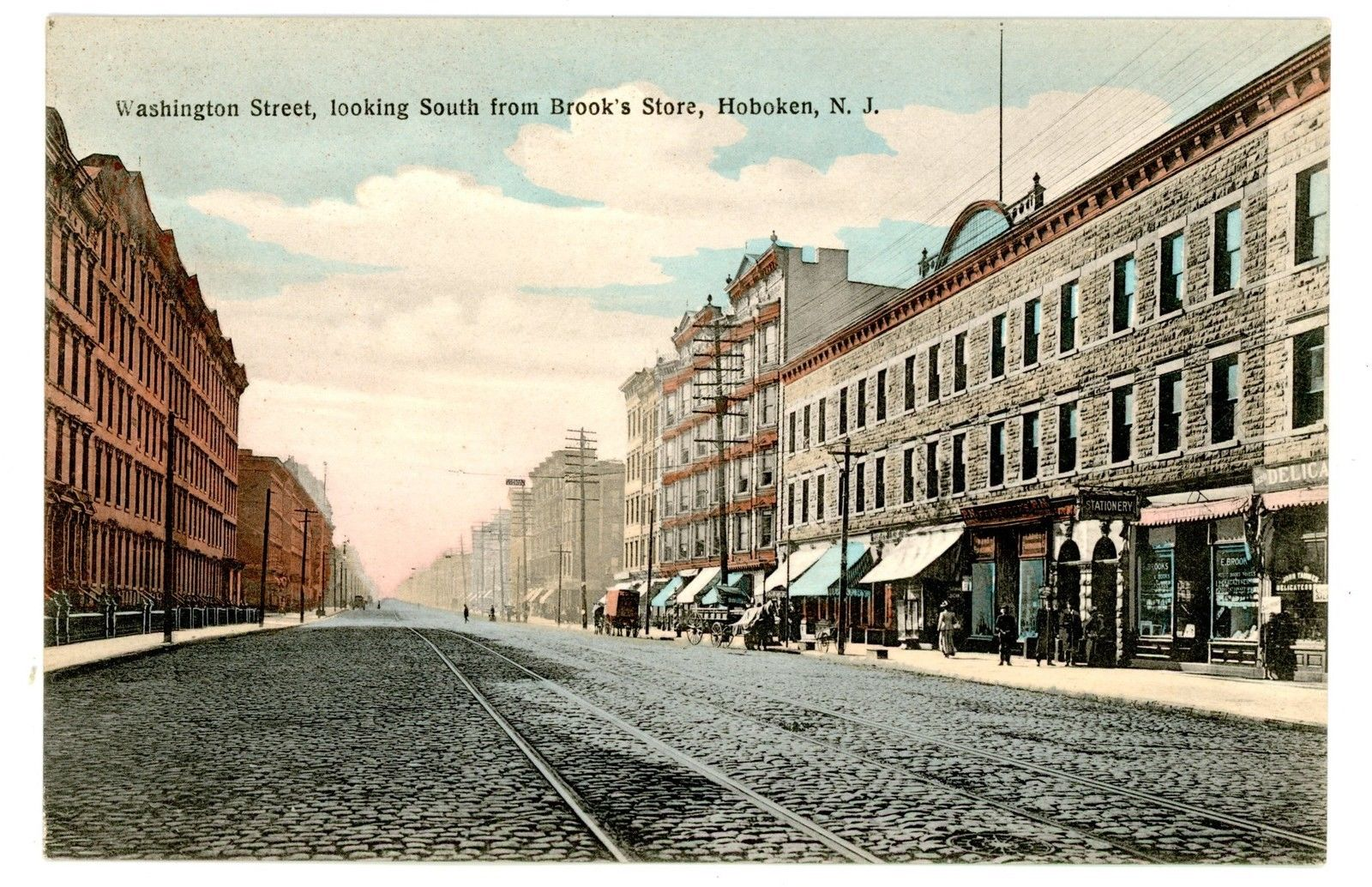
Hoboken, New Jersey, early 20th century

Francis Albert Sinatra was born on December 12, 1915, in an upstairs tenement at 415 Monroe Street (Note: The house no longer exists and burned down before Sinatra's death, but at 417 is a small building with "From Here to Eternity" and an Oscar on the front sign. It was opened as a museum by Ed Shirak in 2001, but had to be closed after five years due to maintenance issues. At 415 there is now an archway and a bronze plaque with his name and "The Voice".) in Hoboken, New Jersey, the only child of Italian immigrants Natalina "Dolly" Garavanta and Antonino Martino "Marty" Sinatra. The couple had eloped on Valentine's Day, 1913, and were married at the city hall in Jersey City, New Jersey; they later were remarried in a church. Sinatra weighed 13.5 pounds (6.1 kg) at birth. His was a breech birth; he had to be delivered with the aid of forceps, which caused severe scarring to his left cheek, neck, and ear, and perforated his ear drum, damage that remained for life. Sinatra's grandmother resuscitated him by running him under cold water until he gasped. Due to his injuries at birth, his baptism was delayed for several months. A childhood operation on his mastoid bone left major scarring on his neck, and during adolescence he suffered from cystic acne that scarred his face and neck. Some children called him "Scarface" when he was eleven; this made him so angry he wanted to physically assault the doctor who had delivered him. Sinatra was baptized at St. Francis Church in Hoboken and was raised Roman Catholic.

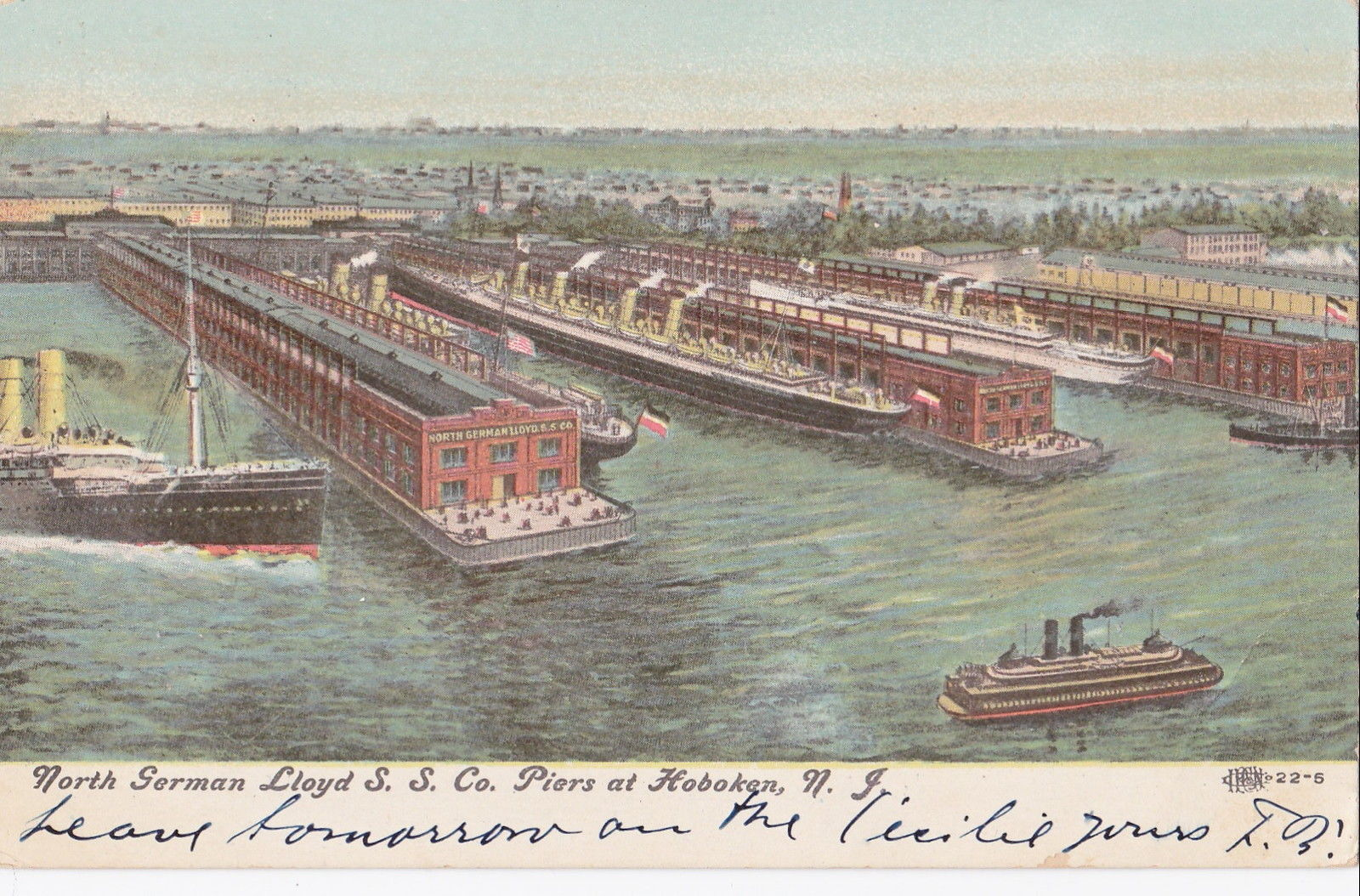
The docks at Hoboken, early 20th century

"They'd fought through his childhood and continued to do so until her dying day. But I believe that to counter her steel will he'd developed his own. To prove her wrong when she belittled his choice of career... Their friction first had shaped him; that, I think, had remained to the end and a litmus test of the grit in his bones. It helped keep him at the top of his game."

— Sinatra's daughter Nancy on the importance of Dolly in Sinatra's life and character.

When Sinatra's mother, Natalina, was a child, her pretty face earned her the nickname "Dolly". As an adult, she stood less than 5 feet (1.5 m) tall and weighed approximately 90 pounds (41 kg). Sinatra biographer James Kaplan describes her as having a "politician's temperament—restless, energetic, unreflective". She was the daughter of a lithographer. Born in Genoa in northern Italy, she was brought to the United States when she was two months old. Dolly was influential in Hoboken and in local Democratic Party circles. She used her knowledge of Italian dialects and fluent English to translate for immigrants during court proceedings, particularly those pertaining to requests for citizenship. This earned her the respect of local politicians, who made her a Democratic ward leader. She was the first immigrant woman to hold that position in her local third ward, and reliably delivered as many as six hundred votes for Democratic candidates. In 1919, she chained herself to city hall in support of the Women's suffrage movement. She also worked as a midwife, earning $50 for each delivery, a fair amount of money at the time. These activities kept Dolly away from home during much of her son's childhood. (Note: According to Sinatra biographer Kitty Kelley, Dolly was a foul-mouthed woman of "such gall that men had to recognize her as their equal".) Sinatra biographer Kitty Kelley claims that Dolly also ran an illegal abortion service that catered to Italian Catholic girls, and was so well known for this doctors referred their patients to her, including in neighboring Jersey City and Union City. (Note: Dolly was reportedly arrested six or seven times and convicted twice for providing illegal abortions, the first of which was in 1937.)

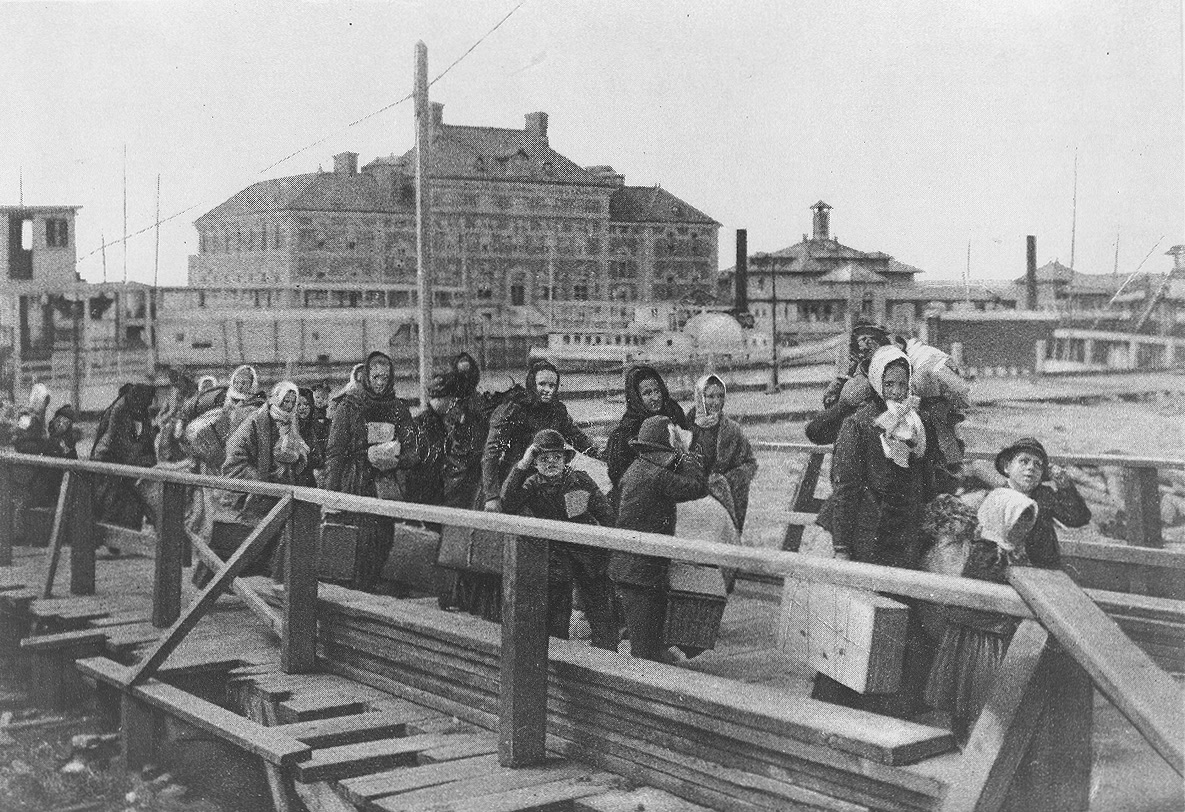
Immigrants arriving at Ellis Island, c. 1902

Sinatra's father, Antonino – a small, blue-eyed, ruddy-complexioned man – was from Lercara Friddi, near Palermo, Sicily. His parents had originally been vineyard cultivators. He arrived at Ellis Island with his mother and sisters in 1903, when they joined his father, Francesco Sinatra, who had immigrated to the US in 1900. Francesco worked for 17 years at the American Pencil company, which "wrecked his lungs" according to granddaughter Nancy. Antonino was a bantamweight boxer who fought under the name Marty O'Brien. Though a boxer, who would talk "loud and rough", he had a gentle, reserved demeanor. He retired from boxing in 1926, after having broken both wrists, and later found work on the docks as a boilermaker, but was soon laid off due to problems with asthma. He served with the Hoboken Fire Department for 24 years, working his way up to Captain. Kaplan claims that Marty never learned to read.

In 1920, Prohibition of alcohol became law in the US. Dolly and Marty ran a tavern during those years, allowed to operate openly by local officials who refused to enforce the law. Kaplan notes the possibility that the Sinatras procured their liquor from members of the American Mafia. They purchased the bar, which they named Marty O'Brien's, with money they borrowed from Dolly's parents. When they were busy with the tavern, Sinatra was watched by relatives and sometimes a Jewish neighbor named Mrs. Goldberg, who taught him Yiddish. When Sinatra was six, his uncle Babe, Dolly's brother, was arrested for driving a getaway car after a Railway Express truck driver was murdered. Though Dolly attended his trial daily and attempted to evoke sympathy, her brother was convicted and sentenced to prison for 15 years. Other family members had minor clashes with the law; Sinatra's father and uncles had been arrested for assorted minor offenses. Sinatra later recalled spending time at the bar, working on his homework and occasionally singing a song on top of the player piano for spare change. During the Great Depression, Dolly provided money to her son for outings with friends, and for him to buy expensive clothes. He also earned pocket money by singing on street corners. Neighbors described him as the "best-dressed kid in the neighborhood" and the "richest kid on the block", aided by the fact that he was an only child, and had his own bedroom. According to Kaplan, Dolly doted on her son, but she also abused him when he angered her, hitting him with a small bat she kept at Marty O'Brien's. Excessively thin and small as a child and young man, Sinatra's skinny frame later became a staple of his own jokes and those of the Rat Pack members during stage shows, one self-effacing joke being: "A little kid, skinny. So skinny my eyes were single file. Between those two and my belly button my old man thought I was a clarinet".

== Education and musical development ==
Sinatra developed an interest in music, particularly big band jazz, from a young age, and became addicted to listening to the radio, "entranced by the new musical and comedy routines and captivated by the huge audiences they commanded", according to biographer Chris Rojek. He began singing at a young age, sitting on top of the piano at his parents' bar in Hoboken, Marty's O'Brien's. Dolly was not enthusiastic at the idea of her son becoming a singer, but she realized when Sinatra was as young as 11 he had something. Sinatra later recalled: "One day, I got a nickel. I said "This is the racket". I thought, "It's wonderful to sing.... I never forgot it." During his early teenage years Sinatra forced himself to develop his voice. wanting to "make something of himself". He listened heavily to Gene Austin, Rudy Vallée, Russ Colombo and Bob Eberly, and "idolized" Bing Crosby, adopting Crosby's props such as a sailor's cap and pipe in his own performances. Sinatra's maternal uncle, Domenico, gave him a ukulele for his 15th birthday, and he began performing at family gatherings.

Sinatra graduated from David E. Rue Junior High, and enrolled at A. J. Demarest High School on January 28, 1931, where he arranged bands for school dances. He left without graduating, having attended only 47 days before being expelled for "general rowdiness". The school principal, Arthur Stover stated that he "showed no real talent for anything", while Macy Hagerty, his Math teacher, described him as a "lazy boy" with "absolutely no ambition at all when it came to school". Sinatra's father was particularly disappointed with his son, hoping that he would make it to college. Sinatra recalled his father scolding him in his strong local accent on the school step after Stover ordered Sinatra senior to "get him out", exclaiming, "What's the matter with you? You don't want to learn nothing?" To please his mother, he enrolled at Drake Business School, but departed after 11 months.

== Early career ==
Sinatra's father, who knew that his son was interested in getting into show business, insisted that his son find a "real job" to avoid becoming a "bum" after leaving school. Dolly found him work as a delivery boy at the Jersey Observer newspaper (since merged into The Jersey Journal), where his godfather Frank Garrick worked, (Note: Sinatra's loss of employment at the newspaper led to a life-long rift with Garrick. Dolly said of it: "My son is like me. You cross him, he never forgets".) and briefly as a riveter at the Tietjen and Lang shipyard. She was also responsible for his job at the Union Club at 600 Hudson Street in Hoboken, run by Joseph Samperi, where he was paid $40 a week for five weeks. He performed in local Hoboken social clubs such as The Cat's Meow and The Comedy Club, and sang for free on radio stations such as WAAT in Jersey City. In New York he found jobs singing for his supper or for cigarettes. Sinatra began taking 45-minute elocution lessons for a dollar an hour under New York-based vocal coach John Quinlan to improve his speech. Quinlan was impressed by his vocal range, remarking, "He has far more voice than people think he has. He can vocalize to a B-flat on top in full voice, and he doesn't need a mike either". Years later, Sinatra professed that he had never had a proper vocal lesson, but that Quinlan had simply helped him work on vocal calisthenics to "help the throat grow and add a couple of notes on the top and spread the bottom". In 1935, he became interested in joining The Three Flashes, who consisted of a talented kid named Jimmy Petrozelli (aka Jimmy Skelly), Freddy Tamburro (aka Freddy Tamby) and Patty Principe (aka Patty Prince).They would perform at Jimmy's grandfather's ice cream shop and at the Rustic Cabin, where Sinatra was a waiter. He didn't want to be a waiter, so he asked to join the group. The response to this request was "We'll see". He went home, complaining to his mother that wanted to join the group. So his mother, Dolly, went to Freddy Tamburro's mother to ask if he could be in the group. After careful consideration, and the fact that Frank had a car (a giant Chrysler), they begrudgingly accepted him into the group. Major Bowes had heard of the Three Flashes and invited them on his nationwide radio show. On September 5, 1935, The Three Flashes and Frank Sinatra showed up on the show, which delighted Major Bowes. Having seen the new addition to the group, he renamed them The Hoboken Four. They went on stage, singing and dancing fools, singing "Shine" by the Mills Brothers, tap dancing, then doing another number by Cole Porter (unfortunately there's no recording of this), winning the contest with an unheard-of 40,000 call-in votes, the highest number of votes ever received by the program. They won the contest, winning a six-month contract to tour across America by bus and train, receiving $50 a week, more money than they had ever received for their performance. Their reputation was such that no group would go up against them, and they had to change their name so other groups wouldn't know who they are.

After three months on the road, Sinatra had become more experienced and cocky, winning the hearts of the prettiest women, which made Freddy Tamby and Patty Prince jealous. Freddy Tamby started beating on Frank after he made a joke at his expense, and Patty soon followed and joined in on the beatings. Counter to what was said in the past, Jimmy did not join in on the beatings, since he was already engaged to his fiancee, Hazel Mengels, and was not interested in other women. After taking these beatings for awhile and being homesick for his mother, he quit the tour and the Hoboken Four. He went back to Hoboken, and the group disbanded soon after.

In 1938, Sinatra found employment as a singing waiter at a roadhouse called The Rustic Cabin in Englewood Cliffs, New Jersey, for which he was paid $15 a week. The roadhouse was connected to the WNEW radio station in New York City, and Sinatra began performing with a group live during the Dance Parade show. Despite the low salary, he felt that this was the break he was looking for, and boasted to friends that he was going to "become so big that no one could ever touch him". Fellow musicians began to resent his cocksure attitude, and according to one Jersey city musician, Sam Lefaso, Sinatra was mocked for displaying little talent and having a "LOOSE, high voice", which sounded "awful". When they told him that he was a lousy singer, Sinatra would flare up, angrily cursing and swearing at the others.

It was while working at The Cabin that he became involved in a dispute between his girlfriend Toni Della Penta, who suffered a miscarriage, and Nancy Barbato, a stonemason's daughter, in 1939. Sinatra had met Barbato in Long Branch, New Jersey, where he spent most of the summer working as a lifeguard. After Della Penta attempted to tear off Barbato's dress, Sinatra ordered Barbato away and told Della Penta that he would marry Barbato, several years his junior, because she was pregnant. Della Penta went to the police, and Sinatra was arrested on a morals charge for seduction. After a fight between Della Penta and Dolly, Della Penta was later arrested herself. Sinatra married Barbato that year, and Nancy Sinatra was born the following year. The site of The Rustic Cabin is now a gas station, commemorated by a plaque recognizing its historical significance in entertainment history.

== Sources ==
- Donnelley, Paul (2003). Fade to Black: A Book of Movie Obituaries. Omnibus. ISBN 978-0-7119-9512-3.
- Goldstein, Norm (November 1, 1982). Frank Sinatra, ol' blue eyes. Holt, Rinehart, and Winston. ISBN 978-0-03-061921-2.
- Hayes, Harold (1969). Smiling through the apocalypse: Esquire's history of the sixties. McCall Pub. Co. ISBN 978-0-8415-0002-0.
- Hazard, Sharon (2007). Long Branch. Arcadia Publishing. ISBN 978-0-7385-4967-5.
- Howlett, John (1980). Frank Sinatra. Simon & Schuster. ISBN 978-0-671-79094-3.
- Kaplan, James (2011). Frank: The Voice. Anchor. ISBN 978-0-7679-2423-8.
- Kelley, Kitty (1986). His Way: The Unauthorized Biography of Frank Sinatra. Bantam Books Trade Paperbacks. ISBN 978-0-553-38618-9.
- Kuntz, Tom; Kuntz, Phil (2000). The Sinatra Files: The Secret FBI Dossier. Three Rivers Press. ISBN 978-0-8129-3276-8.
- Lahr, John (2000). Show and Tell: New Yorker Profiles. University of California Press. ISBN 978-0-520-23377-5.
- Landrum, Gene N (1 November 2007). Paranoia & Power: Fear & Fame of Entertainment Icons. Morgan James Publishing. ISBN 978-1-60037-273-5.
- Petkov, Steven; Mustazza, Leonard (1995). The Frank Sinatra Reader. Oxford University Press. ISBN 978-0-19-509531-9.
- Rojek, Chris (2004). Frank Sinatra. Polity. ISBN 978-0-7456-3090-8.
- Sann, Paul (1967). Fads, Follies, and Delusions of the American People /by Paul Sann. Crown Publishers.
- Santopietro, Tom (November 11, 2008). Sinatra in Hollywood. St. Martin's Press. ISBN 978-0-312-36226-3.
- Sinatra, Nancy (1986). Frank Sinatra, My Father. Simon and Schuster. ISBN 978-0-671-62508-5.
- Summers, Anthony; Swan, Robbyn (2010). Sinatra: The Life. Transworld. ISBN 978-1-4070-6890-9.
- Travis, Dempsey J. (December 1, 2001). The FBI Files: On the Tainted and the Damned. Urban Research Pr. ISBN 978-0-941484-32-9. Archived from the original on April 29, 2016.
- Turner, John Frayn (January 1, 2004). Frank Sinatra. Taylor Trade Publications. p. 93. ISBN 978-1-58979-145-9.
- Wilson, Colin; Wilson, Damon (May 31, 2011). Scandal!: An Explosive Exposé of the Affairs, Corruption and Power Struggles of the Rich and Famous. Ebury Publishing. ISBN 978-0-7535-4732-8.
