= Statue of Lucille Ball (Celoron, New York) =

Sculpture of Lucille Ball

- Type: Sculpture
- Subject: Lucille Ball
- Location: Celoron, New York, United States; 42.11071°N 79.28256°W (2009 statue) 42.110646°N 79.282098°W (2016 statue)

Lucille Ball is an outdoor sculpture of the American actress and comedienne Lucille Ball. The statue was sculpted by David Poulin and installed in Lucille Ball Memorial Park in Celoron, New York in 2009. The statue became known for its disturbing appearance and for the absence of any resemblance between it and Lucille Ball; it was nicknamed Scary Lucy. In 2016, following negative publicity, Scary Lucy was moved nearby and replaced with a new statue of Lucille Ball created by Carolyn D. Palmer. The new sculpture is known officially as New Lucy and colloquially as Lovely Lucy.

== Scary Lucy ==
A life-size bronze statue of Lucille Ball was installed in Ball's hometown of Celoron, New York in 2009. The statue depicts Ball during the climactic scene from a 1952 I Love Lucy episode entitled "Lucy Does a TV Commercial"; in that scene, Ball's character, Lucy Ricardo, hawks the alcohol-rich patent medicine Vitameatavegamin while experiencing the effects of a heavy dose of the tonic.

The statue met with disappointment and anger in Celoron. Celoron residents noted that the statue bore little resemblance to Ball and that it had an androgynous, unhinged appearance. The statue has been likened to singer Conway Twitty, to actor Steve Buscemi, and to the snake from Beetlejuice. It has also been compared to a zombie from The Walking Dead. The New York Times has described the statue as a "glaring hulk that would be unrecognizable were it not for a bottle of Vitameatavegamin in her hand". One columnist from The Buffalo News asserted that the statue's "deranged grimace and jagged teeth inspire more dread than reverence". The statue became known as Scary Lucy.

A Facebook campaign entitled "We Love Lucy! Get Rid of this Statue" was commenced in 2012. Dave Poulin, the creator of the statue, communicated with town officials about potential modifications to the statue; however, Poulin and the town were unable to reach an agreement as to compensation.

Scary Lucy garnered little outside attention until 2015, when images of it went viral and received international media coverage. At that point, Poulin publicly apologized for the statue in a letter to The Hollywood Reporter. He said, "'I take full responsibility for 'Scary Lucy,' though by no means was that my intent or did I wish to disparage in any way the memories of the iconic Lucy image. From the day of its installation, I have shared my disappointment in the final outcome and have always believed it to be by far my most unsettling sculpture, not befitting of Lucy's beauty or my ability as a sculptor'". In addition, Poulin offered to fix the statue at no charge. Celoron Mayor Scott Schrecengost declined Poulin's offer, stating that the town wished to hire a different artist instead.

When a new statue of Lucille Ball (known to many as Lovely Lucy) was installed in August 2016, Scary Lucy--which "remains an attraction"--was placed 75 yards from it so tourists and others could conveniently visit both statues.

As of February 2017, Poulin had given up sculpting.

== Lovely Lucy ==
On August 1, 2016, it was announced that a new statue of Lucille Ball would replace the original. After considering more than 65 sculptors from across the nation, the town of Celoron chose Carolyn Palmer to create the new statue. On August 6, 2016, the day that would have been Ball's 105th birthday, the new statue was revealed. The seven-feet-tall bronze statue depicts Ball standing on a copy of her Hollywood star, "clad in a polka-dot dress, pearls and heels with her hair curly and coiffed". Palmer said in a statement, "I not only wanted to portray the playful, animated and spontaneous Lucy, but also the glamorous Hollywood icon". She added, "I just hope that all the Lucy fans are pleased and that Lucille Ball herself would have enjoyed this image of her".

The new sculpture was placed on display in Lucille Ball Memorial Park in Celoron. It is known officially as New Lucy and colloquially as Lovely Lucy. The statue has received an enthusiastic response.

== See also ==
- 2009 in art
- 2016 in art
- Nathan Bedford Forrest Statue, a statue with a similar reputation
