= Tom Lee (gang leader) =

American gang leader (died 1918)

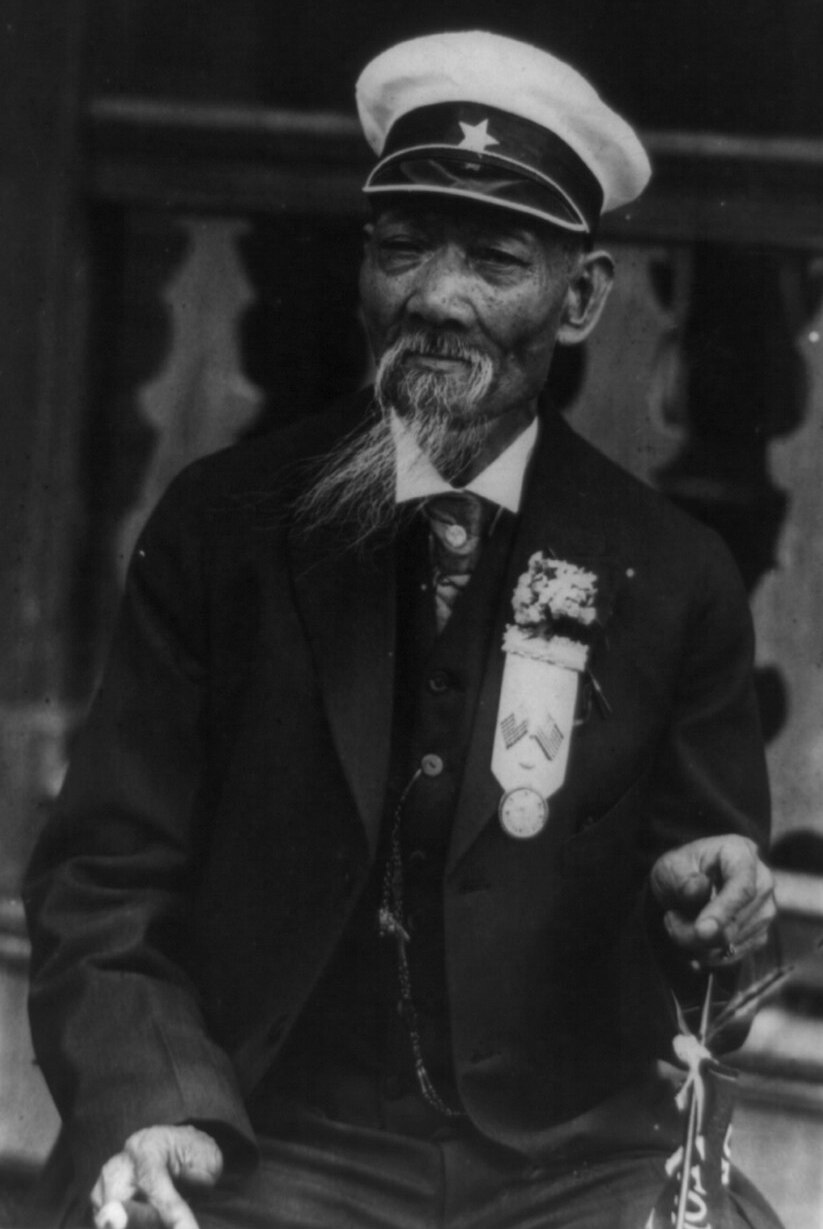
- Lee in 1913
- Born: Wang A. Ling c. 1837; China
- Died: January 10, 1918 (aged 81); Chinatown, Manhattan, New York City, U.S.
- Resting place: San Tin
- Other name: Mayor of Chinatown
- Occupations: Merchant; gang leader
- Known for: leader of On Leong Tong
- Spouse: Elsie Kaylor (died 1916)
- Children: 3

Tom Lee (born Wang A. Ling; c. 1837 – January 10, 1918) was a Chinese American gang leader and merchant. He was leader of On Leong Tong, a tong organization of Chinatown, Manhattan. He was often given the title of "Mayor of Chinatown".

== Early life ==
Lee was born as Wang A. Ling (or Leeng) in China around 1837. He later immigrated to the United States. Lee owned a cooperage business in St. Louis, Missouri. He also worked as a merchant in Philadelphia and as an engineer. He became a naturalized citizen of the United States in 1880.

== Career ==
In 1879, Lee was a member of the Polong Congsee Company. By 1880, he was an importer and merchant in Chinatown, Manhattan. He was the eastern agent of the Chinese Consolidated Benevolent Association. He had a basement merchandise and grocery store on Mott Street. He also had a tobacco store and a restaurant. By 1880, he was a deputy sheriff in Manhattan. In 1883, he was sworn in by Sheriff Davidson to the role. He served in that role for almost 15 years. He was also affiliated with Tammany Hall. He supported Tammany Hall politician Thomas F. Foley. New York City Assistant District Attorney Francis Patrick Garvan discovered a law that Lee could not legally vote, so Lee stopped voting.

In May 1883, Lee was arrested under suspicion of money extortion. In 1894, the Lexow Committee interviewed business owners about Lee. They stated that Lee collected money from their businesses. Lee was called the "Mayor of Mott Street" and the "Mayor of Chinatown".

Herbert Asbury in Gangs of New York described Chinatown in the late 1890s as "peaceful" under Lee's rule. Wong Get had challenged Lee, but was unsuccessful. Lee succeeded Gim Gum as the leader of the On Leong Tong, a tong organization. By 1900, the organization was in a conflict with Mock Duck and the Hip Sing Tong. Leong Tong was also in a war against the Four Brothers. In 1901, Lee was reportedly almost killed when a bullet struck an alarm clock near his bed in his apartment in Chinatown. In 1902, San Francisco hit men were sent to kill Lee. In February 1905, on the eve of the Chinese New Year festivities in New York, red placards were placed in Chinatown calling for the assassination of Lee for a US$3,000 reward and the assassinations of other members of the On Leong Tong. In August 1905, the New York World reported that five Chinese men had been dispatched with revolvers from Philadelphia on the Pennsylvania Railroad to kill Lee. By 1905, he had reportedly been almost shot or stabbed three times. According to contemporary sources, he wore a shirt of chain mail underneath his vest to protect himself in Chinatown. He also carried a pistol on a special permit and had a bodyguard. Gangs of New York describes him as carrying two guns and a hatchet. In February 1912, his nephew Lee Kay was shot leaving Lee's apartment on Mott Street and later died.

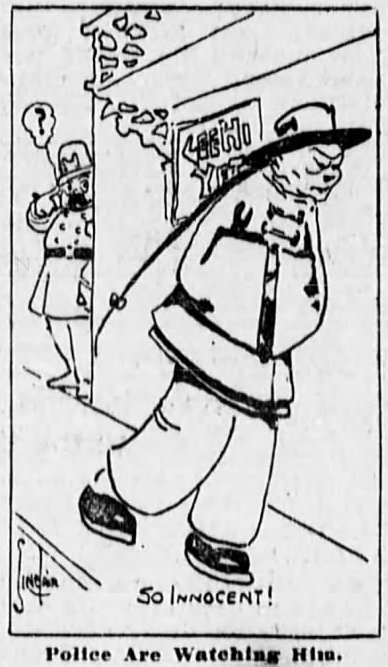
1905 caricature of Lee being watched by the police

On April 26, 1905, Lee was arrested under the order of New York City Police Commissioner William McAdoo following the request of Frank McClintock, an agent of Charley Parkhurst's Society and who was associated with Hip Sing Tong. Lee was charged with running a gambling house. McClintock stated that he wanted to charge Lee for collecting US$15 a week from every table running in the gambling houses of Chinatown. In 1906, Warren W. Foster, judge of the Court of General Sessions, worked with Lee and the leaders of Hip Sing Tong to sign a treaty. After the treaty, Lee reportedly drank 107 mugs of rice wine at the Port Arthur Restaurant of Mott Street to celebrate. By 1909, the peace had soured. He abdicated his role as the head of On Leong for a period in December 1909. He later helped organize a treaty of peace amongst other tongs in Chinatown. In 1911, he retired as "Mayor of Chinatown".

In 1880, Lee was one of the incorporators of Lone We Tong Eng Ti (The United Brotherhood of Masons or the United Chinese Brethren Society), a Masonic order in Chinatown. He later served as the organization's president.

== Personal life ==
Lee married Elsie Kaylor, a German woman. They had two sons and one daughter, Frank, Tom Jr., and Rosa. His wife predeceased him in 1916. His daughter Rosa died in 1883. He lived on Mott Street in Chinatown. He had a home on Butler Place in The Bronx for his family. He also owned an estate in Westchester County. He was a Baptist. He died on January 10, 1918, aged 81, at his home on Mott Street in Chinatown.

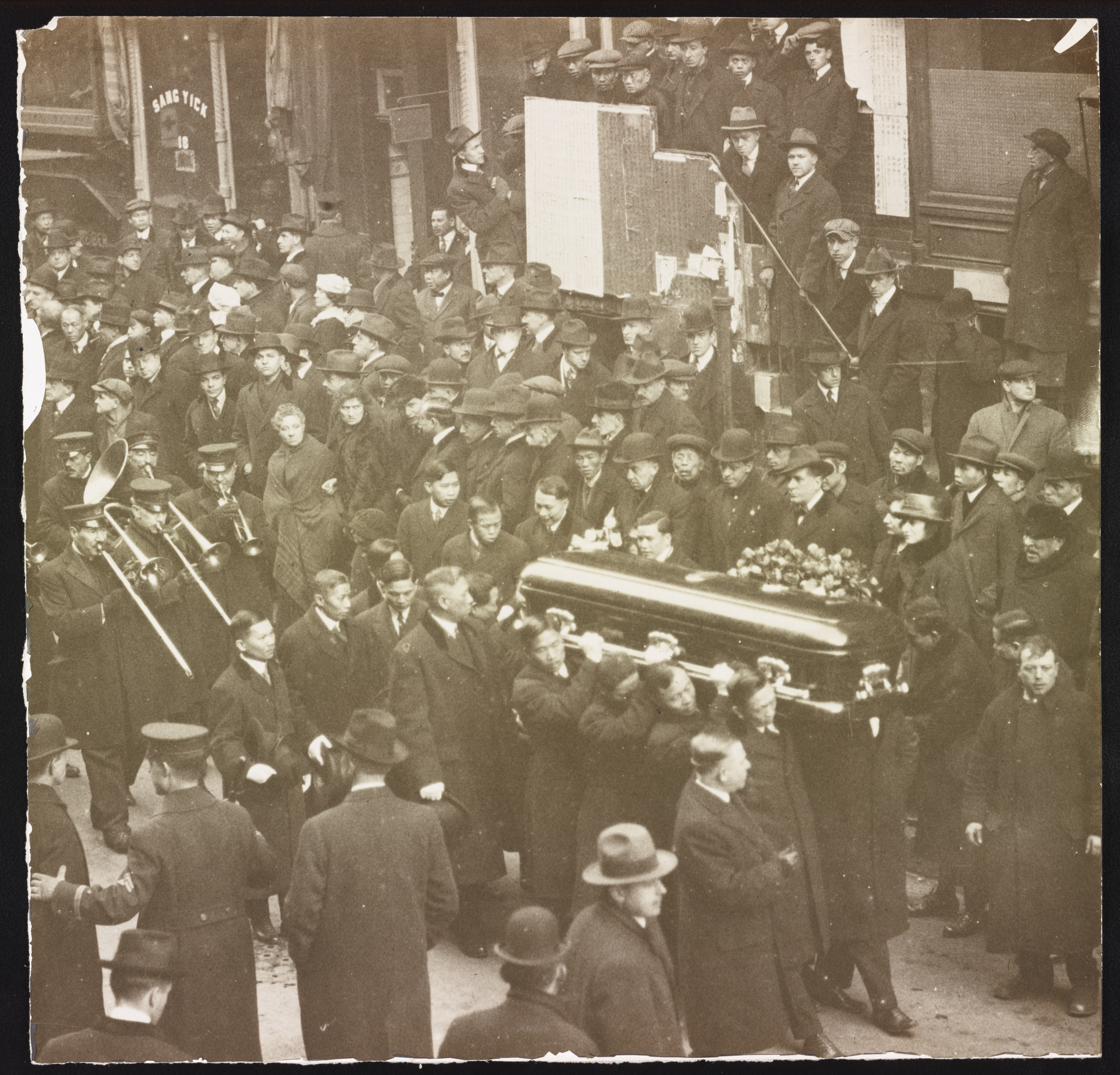
Funeral of Lee in 1918

Lee's funeral procession included a hearse drawn by six black veiled horses. It was led by two brass bands and a Chinese band. His pallbearers included members of the Lee family and his lieutenant and On Leong Tong successor Charley Boston. Reportedly thousands attended his funeral in New York City and there were around 130 carriages at his funeral. There were representatives of On Leong Tong from Chicago, Philadelphia, and Boston. The funeral ceremony was both Baptist and Chinese. He was buried in a plot at Cypress Hills Cemetery owned by On Leong Tong. In April 1918, he was transported back to China to be buried in San Tin.
