= Bob Franke =

American folk singer-songwriter (1947–2025)

- Born: July 25, 1947; Hamtramck, Michigan, U.S.
- Died: October 16, 2025 (aged 78) Antigua Guatemala, Guatemala
- Genres: American folk music
- Occupations: Musician; songwriter
- Instruments: Vocals; guitars; banjo
- Labels: Flying Fish; Great Divide; Daring; Telephone Pole; Waterbug; Fretless; Not On Label
- Website: www.bobfranke.com

Bob Franke (July 25, 1947 – October 16, 2025) was an American folk singer-songwriter.

== Life and career ==
Franke began his career in 1965, while a student at the University of Michigan, and performed at The Ark, a coffeehouse in Ann Arbor.

After graduating from Michigan in 1969 with a degree in English literature, he moved to Cambridge, Massachusetts to attend Episcopal Theological School. He left school to pursue a musical career, and lived in New England, residing in Peabody, Massachusetts.

In addition to his performing career, he taught songwriting workshops and in 1990, wrote a set of songs for a ballet based on The Velveteen Rabbit. In 1999, the young adult novel Hard Love by Ellen Wittlinger, in which Franke's song of the same name features heavily, was published. Many of his songs have been covered by other artists, including Kathy Mattea, June Tabor, Garnet Rogers, Claudia Schmidt, John McCutcheon, Peter, Paul and Mary, and others. His song "Thanksgiving Eve" was covered by Isaac Guillory on the album Slow Down in 1992. Four of Franke's songs are included in the folk song collection Rise Up Singing: "Beggars to God", "The Great Storm Is Over", "Hard Love" and "Thanksgiving Eve".

Franke, a liberal Christian, often covers spiritual and personal themes in his songwriting. His song "Alleluia, the Great Storm Is Over" was written shortly after his young daughter's orthopedic condition was diagnosed, and he has said that he composed the song while working at a chocolate factory, and that the rhythm of the song was based on the rhythm of the machines. "Love Bravely, Elizabeth" is addressed to the same daughter, and the songs on his album The Desert Questions were written after his divorce. Some of his writing is political. The song "Kristallnacht Is Coming" on his album The Heart of the Flower draws parallels between the Holocaust and Americans' attitudes towards immigrants during the 1990s and "El Niño" (on The Desert Questions) protests Proposition 187.

His 1989 album Brief Histories has as its theme the history of Salem, Massachusetts, with songs about the witch trials, the Salem Willows amusement park, and Alexander Graham Bell.

Franke died from a heart attack on October 16, 2025, at the age of 78. He had been recovering from injuries suffered when he was hit by a speeding motorcycle while crossing the street near his new home of Antigua, Guatemala, where he and his wife had relocated earlier that year.

== Discography ==
- Love Can't Be Bitter All the Time (Fretless, 1976) (out of print)
- One Evening in Chicago (Great Divide, 1982)
- For Real (Flying Fish, 1986)
- Brief Histories (Flying Fish, 1989)
- In This Night (Flying Fish, 1991)
- The Heart of the Flower (Daring, 1995)
- Long Roads, Short Visits (Daring, 1997)
- The Desert Questions (Telephone Pole, 2001)
- The Other Evening in Chicago (Waterbug, 2005)
- Until We Must Part (Telephone Pole, 2017)
- Meditations on the Passion (tribute) (Not On Label, 2022)

== Miscellaneous ==
- Marblehead Grows: A Harvest Folk Cantata (w/ Maria Sangiolo) (Not On Label, 1996)

== See also ==
- Rise Up Singing
