= Bow Kum =

Chinese-American human trafficking and murder victim (1888-1909)

- Born: 1888; Guangzhou, Qing Dynasty
- Died: August 15, 1909 (aged 21); Chinatown, New York, United States
- Cause of death: Murdered
- Other name: Sweet Flower
- Employer(s): Hip Sing Tong; On Leong Tong
- Known for: Her murder instigated the Tong Wars in New York's Chinatown between 1909 and 1910.
- Spouses: Low Hee Tong; Tchin Len

Bow Kum (1888 – August 15, 1909) known as Sweet Flower was a Chinese-born human trafficking victim held by the Hip Sing Tong and later the On Leong Tong around the turn of the 20th century. Her murder was one of the most well-publicized and notorious crimes in New York's history and was the cause of the year-long Tong War between the On Leong Tong and its rivals the Hip Sings and the Four Brothers.

== Early life ==
Bow Kum was born in Canton, China, in 1888.

== Chinese Tong slave girl ==
As a young girl, she was sold by her father for only a few dollars and brought to San Francisco around 1907, where she was purchased for $3,000 by Low Hee Tong. Tong, a high-ranking member of the Hip Sings and Four Brothers, lived with her for four years until he was arrested by police.

When he was unable to produce a marriage license for Bow Kum, she was placed with Christian missionaries under Donaldina Cameron, a Scotswoman who spent much of her life helping young Chinese slave girls escape from tongs. Bow Kum eventually married Tchin Len, a truck gardener and member of the On Leong Tong, who took her back to New York as his wife.

== Murder and 1909 New York Tong War ==
Len was eventually confronted by Low Hee Tong, who demanded compensation for the money he had "invested" in the girl, but Len refused to pay him. Low Hee Tong then petitioned the Hip Sings and the Four Brothers in a letter explaining his grievance. The Tong leaders felt his claim was justified and made demands upon the On Leong Tong on Low Hee Tong's behalf. When the On Leong Tong ignored them, the Hip Sings and the Four Brothers declared war.

A few days later, a Tong hatchetman slipped into the Mott Street residence of Tchin Len on the early morning of 15 August 1909, and brutally murdered Bow Kum. Her body was found in their bedroom, stabbed three times in the heart, badly mutilated, with some of her fingers cut off. The war between the Chinatown Tongs would continue for over a year before a truce was arranged through mediation by the US government and the Chinese governments.

== Notable Chinese tongs ==
- Bing Kong Tong
- Hip Sing Tong
- On Leong Tong
- Suey Sing Tong
- Hop Sing Tong

== See also ==
- Hui
- Tong Wars
- Triad (underground society)
- Tiandihui
- List of Chinese criminal organizations
- List of criminal enterprises, gangs and syndicates
