= 1928 Fairfield murders =

Mass murder in California, U.S.

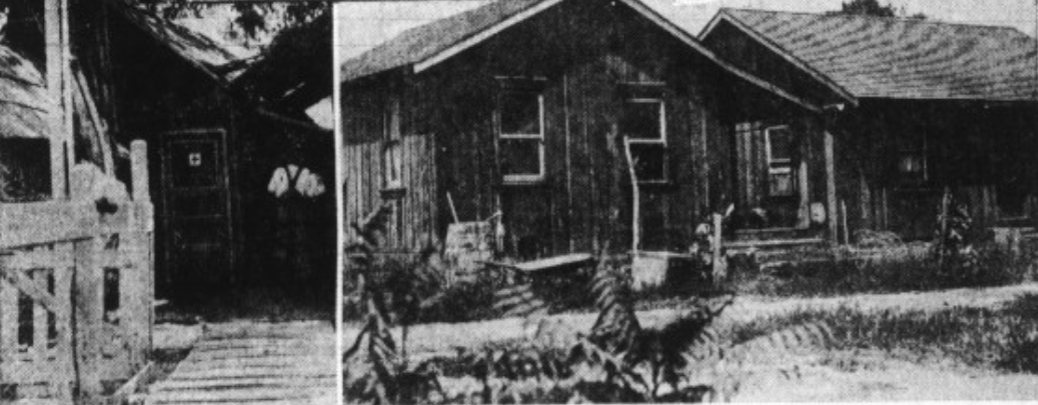
- Dugout (left) and cabin bunkhouses (right) where five of the victims were murdered
- Location: 38.14°N 122.07°W; Bryan ranch Rockville, California, U.S
- Date: August 22, 1928; 98 years ago
- Target: Bryan ranch residents
- Attack type: Mass shooting, stabbing, home invasion
- Weapons: .25-35 rifle; Hatchet
- Deaths: 11 (9 by gunfire, 2 by axe)
- Injuries: 4
- Perpetrator: Leung Ying
- Motive: Revenge against the Wong family over perceived romantic breakup and alleged poisoning attempts (according to Leung); Mental instability caused by substance addiction (police)
- Convictions: Murder x11
- Judge: W.T. O'Donnell

On August 22, 1928, a mass murder took place at the Bryan ranch near Fairfield, California, United States. Eleven people, including seven members of the Wong family, were killed in a shooting and axe attack.

The perpetrator, Leung Ying, fled the scene in a car, but was caught a day later during a manhunt. Following his confession, Leung's actions were attributed to mental instability caused by long-term narcotic addiction. He was sentenced to death the same month in a one-day trial. About three weeks before his scheduled execution date, Leung committed suicide by hanging while on death row.

The Bryan ranch killings were the worst case of mass murder in California history at that time, surpassing the McGlincy murders in Campbell in 1896, and the spree shooting of John Goins in Stockton and Galt in 1926, which each had six victims.

== Background ==
=== Location ===
Solano County had previously gained local notoriety for a different murder, also committed with an axe and with a suspected Chinese perpetrator. On October 17, 1927, 88-year-old Margaret Coghan Shelly, an Irish-born widow, was found dead in her home, having been bludgeoned to death two days earlier. Shelly's Chinese tenant, Sam Wong, was initially suspected before witness testimony implicated Choy Kim, who had fled the area for San Francisco before escaping back to China. Although Solano County police and the Bureau of Immigration had tracked down Choy Kim's location in China, extradition was not approved by Chinese authorities due to a law requiring eyewitnesses to crimes.

=== Ranch ===
The Bryan ranch, also known as the Wong Gee ranch, was a 65 acres (0.26 km^{2}) property, located in unincorporated Solano County at the Suisun Slough, 5 miles (8.0 km) southwest of Fairfield and 1.5 miles (2.4 km) from the state highway between Mankas Corner and Vallejo. The ranch, operated as a pear and peach orchard, was run by Wong Gee (Chinese: 黃朱), also known as Wong Fook Hong (Chinese: 黃福康), who had obtained the land under a forty-year lease prior to the 1913 Alien Land Law. Wong was a prominent leader of nearby Rockville's Chinatown community, most of whom hailed from Dachong and Shaxi, and had previously been a foreman at the A.T. Hatch ranch in Suisun Valley. The Bryan ranch mainly employed fellow Chinese labourers from the Hatch colony as farm hands.

==== Prior incidents ====
On September 17, 1927, eleven months prior to the murders, 38-year-old Jung Lee Fong (also named as Chung Fu Gee), a Chinese worker from the nearby S.C. Armstrong ranch, ran amok at the Bryan ranch, reportedly following a dispute over fruit deliveries with Wong Gee. Jung set fire to the living quarters of the workers and their families using a five gallon barrel of coal oil and armed with an iron bar (later misreported as an axe), he injured five laborers who tried to intervene. Jung was seen dancing around the fire when Wong Gee appeared. Jung attacked Wong with a still-burning torch, at which point Wong fatally shot Jung in the windpipe. Wong was arrested by responding officer Ernest Lockie and jailed, but released the next day. On September 20, the killing was declared a justifiable homicide via self-defense by the superior court. One of those wounded in the attack was Young Foon, who became one of the fatal victims in the 1928 shooting.

In the spring of 1928, Leung Ying was employed for about three months as a cook and fruit picker. Leung was eventually dismissed in June for attacking and attempting to rape Wong Gee's daughter Nellie, though he would later claim that it was a consensual affair. Leung repeatedly tried to reapply for a job at the ranch, but was turned down each time. Although Leung admitted in interrogation that he had physically assaulted Nellie Wong, relatives of the Wong family stated that Leung was instead dismissed for his inability to work due to his regular narcotics use.

== Bryan ranch murders ==
The murders took place in the morning hours of August 22, 1928, beginning either around 6:30 a.m., 8:30 a.m., or just after 9:00 a.m. Leung was armed with a stockless .25-35 rifle (also described as a sawn-off shotgun), and under the influence of "dope", either opium or cocaine.

According to a police reconstruction, Leung first entered what was variously identified as an underground gambling room, or a dugout, where Wong Gee was reportedly smoking an opium pipe. At least one worker was also present, either playing a card game with Wong Gee, or looking to get the day's work orders. Leung opened fire, killing Wong Gee with a shot through the heart and fatally wounding worker Cheung Yueng, who crawled for the main door before succumbing to his wounds. The Oakland Tribune gave a different account, stating that Wong Gee (misspelled as "Ge Tong") was in the dugout to wake two sleeping workers, Cheung (named as "Chan Yim") and Wa Wey (named as "Wah Toy"). Per this version, Wong Gee was killed while standing and Cheung was killed fully dressed on a bed, while Wa was shot in the back as he fled. Another recollection of the dugout shooting by the county sheriff, Jack Thornton, claimed that only two people, Wong Gee and Wong Wing Hong, were killed with shots to the torso.

Leung next went to the residence of Wong Hueng, Wong Gee's brother, which doubled as either a laundry house or office. Leung could not enter as the occupant had locked himself inside and attempted to hide under a bed, but Leung shot through a window, hitting Wong Hueng in the abdomen. Leung then made his way to the cutting shed, which was the home of the ranch's cook, Low Shek Way, who was wounded by a shot through the stomach. Low was later taken to Fairfield hospital, where he died a few hours later. While walking half a mile through towards the home of Wong Gee, Leung shot and killed worker Yeung Foon, who was standing in an orchard collecting pears. Another worker, named in early reports Lo Wa Way, was able to escape the shooting to the neighboring farm of Wong Gee's half-brother, Wong Quay a.k.a. Sam Wong, using a telephone there to call police, at around 9:00 a.m. The Thornton account claimed that Wong Hueng, as Wong Wing Hong, had already been killed at the dugout, identifying the man killed at the laundry house as "the boy of Low Chuck Way", who was shot twice, with the first gunshot breaking his left leg and the second striking him in the heart. Afterwards, Yeung, identified as "Yung Fong", was stated to have been shot to death in his bed in a shack 200 yards (180 m) from the laundry house before Low Chuck Way was killed after crossing paths with Leung in the orchard. A surviving witness stated that he saw an elderly worker, named as Yeung Soon, attempting to reason with Leung before the elderly worker was shot four times in the chest. Another account claimed that Leung encountered one of the victims in company of two white women, whom he asked to step aside before fatally shooting the man.

At the house's porch, Leung shot fifteen-year-old Nellie Wong in the abdomen as she was walking down some steps to go to school in Rockville. Shortly after he entered the home, Wong Gee's wife, cradling her ten-day old son, appeared in the doorway. Leung killed her with a shot between the eyes. Afterwards, Leung walked into the children's room, where Wong Gee's sons, four-year-old Johnnie and three-year-old Willie, were asleep in beds. Johnnie was shot through the head at close range while Willie died of cranial injuries when Leung crushed his skull with a hatchet he carried. It's presumed that Leung had run out of ammunition by then. Before leaving the house, Leung hacked open Mrs. Wong's abdomen with the blade, then turned her over to fatally slash the baby's throat, nearly decapitating him. Two of Wong Gee's other children, seven-year-old Ruth and nine-year-old Helen, escaped unharmed by hiding under a bed in a room located at the back of the Wong residence, though their hiding place has also been misreported as an attic or closet, shortly after awakening after hearing the sounds of their mother's murder. They reportedly fled the house as soon as Leung left and were then hidden by family friends.

Nellie was initially treated at Solano County Hospital in Fairfield before she was transferred to Vallejo General Hospital, where she died on August 27 despite a good prognosis from an infected wound, becoming the eleventh and final victim. She had regained consciousness before her death, but was unable to provide a spoken statement due to her weak state. The attack had lasted less than twenty minutes.

Leung Ying eventually escaped in a Dodge sedan owned by Wong Gee. George and Mary Athanacio, a Spanish couple who lived just a few yards from the Wong residence, saw Leung rummaging through the pockets of Wong Gee, Cheung, and Wa before fleeing the scene from their window. George Athanacio, himself a worker on the Wong Gee ranch, also headed for Sam Wong's ranch to use the phone.

== Manhunt ==
=== Misinformation ===
The perpetrator's identity was disputed for several hours following the killings. Leung's identity was first identified by the name Sam Ying and as aged 35 by surviving workers. Former neighbors at the Hatch ranch provided his real name and that he was Chinese, though some earlier accounts described him as Filipino. The name of the manhunt's subject was frequently misspelled, leading to news reports misnaming Leung Ying as Leung Wing, Leung Ling, Ming Ying, and Loy Yeung, which became the most widespread name for Leung during the search. Initial examinations of Deputy Sheriff Charles Ogle reported that Leung was possibly the same man as a former resident of Walnut Creek, who had been expelled by the Bing Tong-led community two years earlier over an altercation. The weapon used in the attacks was first misidentified as a pistol Afterwards, he was erroneously described as having used a .30-30 Winchester rifle while also carrying a revolver and knife, the latter based on early police assumptions that Leung took a cleaver from the kitchen to kill Willie Wong.

=== Search and capture ===
Immediately after police arrival at the ranch, Solano County Sheriff John R. Thornton ordered all remaining workers to be disarmed and the area checked for additional weapons due to initial suspicions of a gang-related matter and concerns over a potential retaliatory attack by the farmhands. Several firearms and knives, as well as one or two opium pipes were confiscated.

Beginning around 1:00 p.m. that same day, a manhunt, led by Sheriff Thornton, was conducted in Solano and Napa Counties, heavily patrolling the section of I-80 E between Fairfield and Sacramento. Law enforcement of four counties took part in the searches. Besides the police response, 450 tong members of the Bing Kong Tong were dispatched to find Leung. It was assumed that Leung would likely stay in California and remain hidden in the area in order to kill the surviving victims.

Leung drove through Vacaville, initially headed for north, possibly towards Sacramento or Isleton, but at around 11:30 a.m., he turned back south at Dixon, presumably into the Bay Area with the destination of Oakland. In Nevada County, Leung abandoned the stolen car and broke into the house of George Sing. At gunpoint, Leung commandeered Sing's truck and forced Sing to chauffeur him to the Chinatown area of Nevada City, where he had a brother. While in Chinatown, a police patrol questioned Leung, unaware that he was holding the driver of the truck at gunpoint. Since he displayed a calm demeanor and gave a convincing alibi, Leung was let go. After this, Leung made Sing drive to his workplace at the Empire Mine, where Leung stole food from the kitchen.

At around 11:00 p.m., Nevada County Sheriff George Carter and Deputy Sheriff Arthur Hellings spotted Leung in Sing's truck, following him through the night. In the early morning of August 23, the patrol car saw Leung throwing his rifle into some bushes during the ride near Colfax. After recovering the gun, Carter and Hellings continued to follow Leung until around 6:00 a.m., when he jumped off the truck near Grass Valley. The policemen observed as Leung wandered into an abandoned ranch and hid himself in the upper section of a chicken coop to sleep. Five minutes later, the officers revealed themselves and shouted for Leung to surrender. He exited his hiding place without resistance and asked the arresting officers for morphine. Leung presented officers with a hypodermic needle to prove his dependency on drugs and a search of his person yielded "a small black bag, a quantity of Chinese cake, some trinkets and about $100 (equivalent to $1,875 in 2025) in money", the latter sum having been stolen from the Wong residence. Sheriff Thornton was notified and after taking a few photos with Leung and the arresting officers, he was taken to Nevada City, where he was held until the arrival of the Solano County authorities.

== Victims ==
- Wong Gee (黃朱), a.k.a. Wong Fook Hong; (王/黃福康), 48 or 50
- Mrs. Wong Gee (née Young; 楊), a.k.a. Wong Young See (王楊氏), 38 or 41
- Nellie Wong (王鳳嬌), 15 or 16, daughter of Wong Gee
- Johnnie Wong (王贊利), 4, son of Wong Gee
- Willie Wong (王威利), 3, son of Wong Gee
- Frank Wong (王扎平), 10 or 11 days old, son of Wong Gee
- Wong Hueng (王康), a.k.a. Wong Wing Hong (王永康), 40 or 56, brother of Wong Gee
- Wa Wey, a.k.a. Jim Low and Low Way Wey, 36 or 40
- Low Shek Way, a.k.a. Low Chuck and Low Fong, 61
- Young Soon Gum (楊潤金), a.k.a. Young Gum Foon and Young Soon, 66 or 67
- Cheung Yueng, a.k.a. Low Quen Yee, 38 or 65

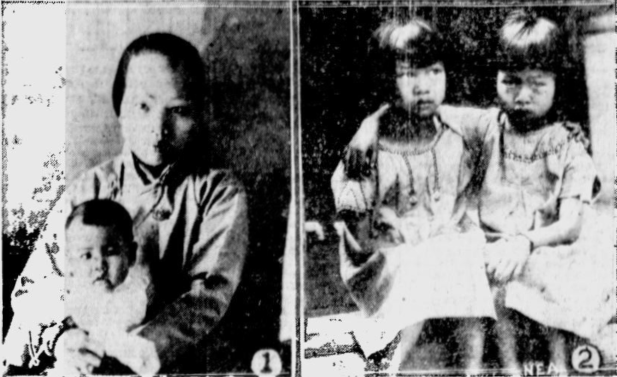
Mrs. Wong Gee with her baby (left) and the surviving Wong siblings Ruth and Helen (right)

Nine victims died at the scene, a tenth died the same day at a hospital while the eleventh victim died five days later. Four of the dead, including Wong Gee, were members of the Bing Kong Tong, though it has also been named as the Hong San tong. One source connects victims Low Shek Way (named as Low Chuck Way) and Wa Wey (named as Jim Low) as father and son. Jim Low was described as either a new farmhand or the superintendent of the James Marshall ranch, having only been at the Bryan ranch on visit. Besides Nellie Wong, all of the injured were treated at the scene and required no hospitalization. One of the injured workers was identified as Gee Fop.

The names and ages of the deceased, particularly those of the four laborers, were reported inconsistently across the press. The workers were also named as Chan Yim, Yung Foon, Wa Wey, and Low Chuck, Chaim Im, Wong Foon, Jim Low, and Low Chuck Way, or Phan Gyim, Young Moon, Wah Toy, and Way Wing, or Chew Yue, Yong Fong, Won Win Fong, and Low Check. Reports after the manhunt consistently identify them as Low Quen Yee, Young Gum Foon, Low Way Wey, and Low Fong.

Wong Gee's name was first widely misreported as Wong Tong, his nephew, who had temporarily held the lease while his uncle spent time back in China a few years earlier. Early reports also claim that the Wong residence was attacked first, that Nellie Wong had leapt out of a window before being shot in the back as she fled, and that Wong Hueng was the final person to be killed at the scene.

== Perpetrator ==
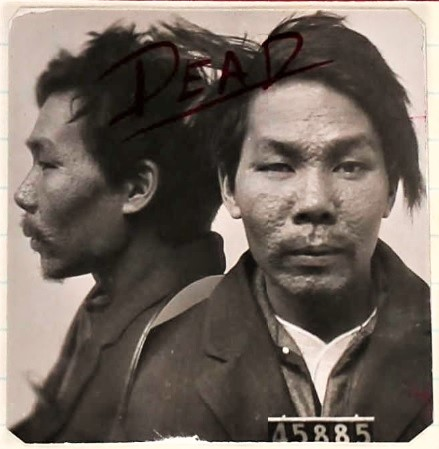
Mugshot of Leung at San Quentin

Leung Ying was born in Canton, China, and immigrated to California, United States, with his parents around 1914 when he was a child. His father was a prosperous farmer in Stockton for twenty years, with both of Leung's parents returning to Canton a few years earlier. Reports directly after the killings described contradictory ages for Leung, typically as 32 years old, but the majority of articles after his arrest give his age as 29. Leung did not know his own birthdate and estimated he was 29 or 30. He was registered in Oakland Chinatown at the time of the murders, though he had reportedly been living in Solano County since at least 1927, possibly as early as 1924 or 1925, having previously worked for the Marshall and Parker ranches in Vacaville. His last known address was at a shack near the Hatch ranch. The night before the murders, Leung was seen walking around Vacaville, apparently talking to himself.

Leung, who also went by the names Wong Gay, Lim Onn, and Frank Chan, previously lived in San Jose, where he was employed at a packing plant. While in San Jose, he was a member of the city's Hop Sing Tong branch, until he was expelled due to his excessive use of narcotics, being a user of morphine and cocaine. According to Leung, he was arrested two times earlier in 1922 or 1923 for "put-up jobs" in Stockton related to his tong, though without being convicted. In 1924, he was arrested by San Francisco police as a gunman and narcotics peddler. Among other Chinese laborers, Leung was already known as a self-admitted murderer, having boasted about fatally shooting three people during a tong war, as signified by three notches on a gun he owned. In addition to his narcotic sales, Leung was also reported to trade in alcohol, which was outlawed at the time, and to procure white prostitutes for numerous ranches. In reports after the shooting, Leung was variously described as a member of the Hop Sing Tong or the Bing Kong Tong.

== Investigation ==
In the immediate aftermath, media speculated that the murders were gang violence related to the Tong Wars, since it was rumored that there was a bounty of $10,000 (equivalent to $187,500 in 2025) on Wong Gee for the 1927 killing of Jung Lee Fong, as he was a member of a rival tong. Shortly after the beginning of the manhunt, Solano County Sheriff J.R. Thornton dismissed any tong involvement, first speculating about a personal feud between Wong and Leung and later blaming Leung's drug use as resulting in mental instability. Similarly, the Hop Sing Tong and the Bing Kong Tong were in agreement that the matter was not gang-related and did not warrant a conflict between the two organisations, although they did warn that if Leung were to escape, both tongs would hunt him down "for weeks, months, years if necessary".

After his capture, Leung told the arresting Sheriff George Carter that he killed the Wong family because they tried to poison him, showing Carter a cake he kept as one such example. When Sheriff Thornton took custody of Leung, he was driven to the Solano County jail, where hundreds of tong delegates, both of the Hop Sing Tong and Bing Kong Tong, had gathered. There were no incidents as Leung was escorted inside, though the group remained at the entrance demanding to be granted access to Leung to confirm his identity and circling the jail throughout the night.

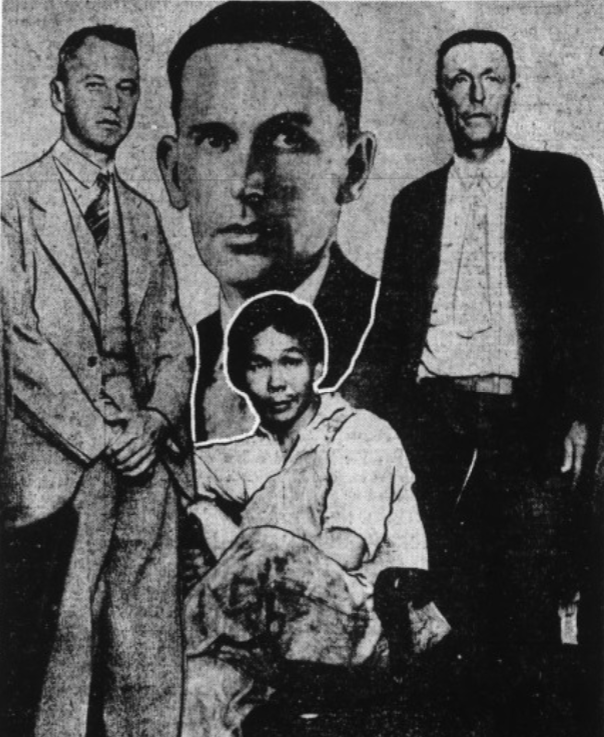
Foreground, left to right: Solano County Sheriff Jack Thornton, Leung Ying, and Deputy Sheriff George Fraser. Background: Nevada County Sheriff George Carter, who captured Leung

During his interrogation with Sheriffs Thornton and Carter, Leung repeated his demand for "the needle" in exchange for a confession, asking for "more shots" throughout questioning. Leung readily admitted to having committed the murders, and stated that he had seen the two police officers trailing him during the night, and, although he had had the opportunity to shoot them at any time, he had refrained from doing so, because he feared he would be hanged if he killed a white man.

When asked for a motive, Leung expressed his admiration for Joe Tanko and Floyd Hall, a pair of robbers and murderers who had gained infamy a few months earlier, saying, "I just like Tanko and Hall – very, very sick." He then told police of his infatuation with Nellie Wong and the disapproval of a potential relationship by her family. Furthermore, he claimed that a "drug-inspired dream" had convinced him that the Wong family and other friends were trying to kill him with poisoned cake, saying he wanted to "kill them first". He also admitted to being "loaded" with cocaine during the murders. Leung refused to maintain any particular explanation. Though Leung claimed he had begun using drugs as a way to cope with his romantic rejection and firing from the ranch, his usage of narcotics had been documented earlier from his residence in San Jose. Additionally, Leung was widely known among other Chinese farm workers as an opium-addicted "hophead", who was frequently forced into withdrawal due to strict anti-drug policies to prevent decreased work efficiency.

In interviews with the press, however, he instead stated that incessant teasing about his lack of intelligence and physical appearance (Leung was of below average height and had deep pockmark scars on his face, likely from smallpox) had pushed him to commit the murders. Leung was disliked by the local Chinese community as an opium-addicted "hophead", as drug use was discouraged among the workforce, leading to him being regularly deprived of drugs.

In the early hours of August 24, Leung attempted to hang himself in his cell. He had knotted a strip of his blanket into a noose, having turned on a water faucet to muffle the sound of tearing fabric. Sheriff Thornton had overheard the running water and a prison guard caught Leung with the makeshift rope around his neck, standing on his bunk to tie the rope around a metal bar of his window. Several guards intervened and after his suicide was foiled, Leung spent the night beating his head against the floor and walls, crying for narcotics.

== Legal proceedings ==
On August 24, Leung was arraigned at the Superior Court in Suisun City. He admitted the murders to the justice of the peace, M.A. Mayward, stating he wished he had the opportunity to kill half a dozen more. He also repeatedly told those present that he "wished to die" and interrupted the testimony of two medical examiners regarding the shooting of Yeung Foon by shouting his agreement of their findings. While in Solano County jail, Leung attempted to convince a guard to temporarily release him, stating that his only regret was that he had not yet killed "a certain elderly Chinese woman" and would return should he be allowed to commit the deed.

Leung's legal process took place at Solano County Superior Court in Fairfield. On the afternoon of August 27, a preliminary hearing was held, which was delayed due to the late arrival of Leung's interpreter, G.S. Dong. Several spectators, most Chinese, had gathered at the court to await Leung's appearance. Leung was escorted through the corridors of the court by six deputies and four traffic officers when, either before or after the hearing, two Chinese men separately attempted to lunge at the prisoner. The men were disarmed by Solano County Sheriff John Thornton and Deputy Sheriff George Fraser and found to have been wielding a 6-inch (15 cm) blade and a sharpened 8-inch (20 cm), 10-pound (4.5 kg) iron bar, but they were let go with a warning. San Francisco Chronicle speculated that the attackers had been motivated by the death of Nellie Wong shortly before the hearing. While Leung declined his right to an attorney, presiding judge William T. O'Donnell assigned Kenneth I. Jones as his defense counsel, despite Jones' protest over representing a murderer. The hearing took thirty minutes, with Jones entering a guilty plea at Leung's request, as his client wanted punishment as soon as possible. Judge O'Donnell scheduled the verdict for August 31 at 10 a.m.

=== Trial and sentencing ===
Leung's trial began in the afternoon hours of August 30 and was described as one of the shortest formal murder trials in state history. State assessors and the county sheriff declared Leung sane. After a five-minute recess, Leung pleaded guilty. In the morning hours of August 31, less than 24 hours after the trial's beginning, the verdict was read, sentencing Leung to death by hanging. In reaction to this, Leung reportedly laughed uproariously and said, through his interpreter, "I'm glad it's over". Leung's execution was to take place on November 9 of the same year.

Chan Gum, a leader of the Solano County Chinese community, voiced support for the sentence, stating "My people are satisfied". Frank T. Green, of Theodore Green Apothecary in San Francisco, challenged the decision to declare Leung mentally fit based on his own chemical "analysis".

=== Imprisonment and suicide ===
Leung was imprisoned at San Quentin Prison, where he was held on death row alongside twelve other men. Leung was set to be executed by hanging on the same date alongside George Costello, Louis Lazarus, and William "Red" O'Brien, a trio of bank robbers convicted of the murder of Oakland Bank teller William McFarlin. It would have marked the first quadruple execution at the prison, as San Quentin had never executed more than two people at the same time as the gallows only had two nooses. While on death row, Leung shared a cell with Leong Fook (also erroneously spelled as Leon Fook and Lee Sook), a fellow Chinese immigrant, convicted of the murder of his sister-in-law Chuey Ying.

On October 22, 1928, after six weeks on death row, Leung killed himself in his prison cell in San Quentin Prison between 9 p.m. and 11 p.m. He had knotted a towel into a noose and tied it around a bar at the cell door, asphyxiating himself by leaning forwards in a standing position. The cellmate Leong Fook did not alert the correctional staff. Leung's suicide was the first successful instance on San Quentin's death row. In November 1928, the handmade noose was given to Sheriff Jack Thornton by Warden James Holohan as an exhibit piece for the Solano County jail. Leung was buried in San Quentin prison cemetery, where he was buried as "Leong Ying", with Ying used as his last name.

== Legacy ==
In the October 1928 issue of 2-0 Police Journal, the manhunt was praised as an example of cooperation between law enforcement officers across different counties.

Although the killings were widely publicized in its immediate aftermath, the event became disregarded as its effects were confined to the Chinese community, which faced considerable ostracization. Closer coverage lasted only a week, ending with Leung Ying's death sentence. His death went largely unnoticed, as his name was again misspelled, this time as "Leong Ying", in all contemporary reports.

Sam Wong took ownership of the ranch and together with the family tong, Sam Wong arranged the interment of the dead. Two days after the murders, a funeral procession was held in Suisun City for six of the deceased, the Wong family (the initially unnamed infant was buried with his mother and Nellie Wong had not yet died by this point) and one of the workers, identified as Young Gum Foon. The rites used a mix of Buddhist, Chinese folk religion and Christian burial traditions. The dead were initially buried in a mass grave in Rockville's cemetery. On September 2, another ceremony was held for Nellie Wong. In 1952, the Tung Sen Benevolent Association, a huiguan for immigrants from the Longdu area of Zhongshan, exhumed the bodies of the Wong family and Young Gum Foon and reburied them at a Chinese cemetery near Colma. The three other fatalities Low Fong, Low Quen Yee, and Low Way Wey, were repatriated to China for burial. Rockville Chinatown was deserted six months after the killings.

The surviving Wong sisters, Ruth and Helen, were taken in by Mary Athanacio in the shooting's immediate aftermath. Three Chinese family friends sheltered the girls for the coming days, allowing them back to the house a day after the shooting when the girls requested to pick up spare clothes from home. They were later housed in an orphanage and on September 25, 1928, other relatives requested custody of the sisters through the juvenile court, with plans to first enroll them at a school in China, during which time they would live with their grandmother and uncle, before sending them back to the United States for further education. As the sisters were jus soli American citizens, the matter was adjourned for a three-month investigation by immigration services. Ruth and Helen Wong were eventually relocated to San Francisco and became nurses as adults.

The December 1985 issue of the Solano Historian magazine published a June 2, 1981 speech to the California Historical Society by journalist Evelyn Lockie, who was a resident of Rockville and involved with its Chinatown community in the 1920s. Lockie was familiar with the family of Wong Gee, who was a friend of her father and traveled to the scene of the Bryan ranch murders as a reporter for The Sacramento Bee, unaware of who the victims were until the deputy in charge mentioned their names. Lockie wrote a speech to commemorate the killings over fifty years after the murders to call for a memorial to the victims as well as Rockville's now largely abandoned Chinatown.

== See also ==
- List of shootings in California

== Bibliography ==
- Lockie, Evelyn: The Village That Vanished in Solano Historian, December 1985.
- Waters, Tony: When killing is a crime; Lynne Rienner Publishers Inc, 2007. ISBN 978-1-58826-514-2
- Solano's Sheriff – Jack Thornton Makes Record in Capturing Murderous Chinese Gunman, in 2-0 Police Journal; October 1928 (p. 8).
- ; Leung, Peter C.Y. and Waters, Tony "Chinese Pioneer Farming Families in the Suisun Valley of California, " in 150 Year of Chinese Presence in California, published by the Sacramento Chinese Cultural Foundation and Asian-American Studies, University of California, Davis 2001.
- Chaddock, Don: Cemetery Tales: Ying and Young, California Department of Corrections and Rehabilitation, October 27, 2022 (includes mugshot)
