= Xia (surname) =

Xia (夏)
- Pronunciation: Xià (Mandarin); Ha (Cantonese)
- Language: Chinese

Origin
- Language: Old Chinese
- Meaning: Summer

Other names
- Variant forms: Hsia (Taiwan), Ha
- Derivatives: Ha (Korean), Hạ (Vietnamese), Chea (Cambodian)

Xia is the Mandarin pinyin romanization of the Chinese surname written 夏 in Chinese character. It is romanized Hsia in Wade–Giles, and Ha in Cantonese. Xia is the 154th surname in the Song dynasty classic text Hundred Family Surnames. As of 2008, it is the 66th most common Chinese surname, shared by 3.7 million people.

== Notable people ==
- Xia Zhengshu (夏征舒; died 598 BC), Minister of the State of Chen who killed Duke Ling of Chen and usurped the throne
- Consort Xia (夏姬; died 240 BC), mother of King Zhuangxiang of Qin and grandmother of Qin Shi Huang
- Empress Dowager Xia (6th century), mother of Emperor Jing of Liang
- Xia Luqi (882–930), Later Tang general
- Xia Song (夏竦; 985–1051), Song dynasty general, Duke of Ying
- Empress Xia (Song dynasty) (died 1167), wife of Emperor Xiaozong of Song
- Xia Gui (fl. 1195–1224), Song dynasty painter
- Xia Yuanji (1366–1430), Ming dynasty government minister
- Xia Chang (1388–1470). Ming dynasty painter and official
- Xia Yan (1482–1548), Ming dynasty government minister
- Empress Xia (1492–1535), Ming dynasty empress, wife of the Zhengde Emperor
- Xia Yunyi (1596–1645), Ming dynasty poet and anti-Qing military leader
- Xia Wanchun (夏完淳; 1631–1647), poet, soldier, and son of Xia Yunyi, executed by the Qing at age 16
- Xia Xie (夏燮; 1800–1875), Qing dynasty historian, author of Ming Tongjian (明通鑑)
- Xia Suntong (夏孙桐; 1857–1941), historian, co-author of Draft History of Qing
- Xia Zengyou (夏曾佑; 1863–1924), historian and educator
- Xia Tonghe (夏同龢; 1868–1925), Qing dynasty zhuangyuan and calligrapher
- Xia Shoutian (夏壽田; 1870–1935), Qing dynasty and Republic of China artist and politician
- Xia Ruifang (夏瑞芳; 1871–1914), co-founder of the Commercial Press, assassinated by Chen Qimei
- Xia Gong (1872–1941), Republic of China politician
- Xia Kaifu (夏偕復; 1874–?), Republic of China ambassador to the United States
- Xia Renhu (夏仁虎; 1874–1963), Republic of China politician and scholar
- Xia Jingguan (夏敬观; 1875–1953), poet, President of Fudan Public School (now Fudan University)
- Xia Chao (1882–1926), Republic of China general, Governor of Zhejiang province
- Xia Douyin (1885–1951), Republic of China general, Governor of Hubei province
- Xia Mianzun (夏丏尊; 1886–1946), educator and writer
- Xia Qifeng (1888–1961), politician of the Wang Jingwei regime
- Xia Suchu (1889–?), politician of the Wang Jingwei regime
- Xia Qin (1892–1950), President of the Supreme Court of the Republic of China
- Xia Wei (夏威; 1893–1975), Republic of China general, Governor of Anhui province
- Xia Guozhang (夏國樟; 1896–1937), lieutenant general and brother of Xia Wei, killed in the Second Sino-Japanese War
- Xia Minghan (1900–1928), Communist revolutionary
- Xia Yan (1900–1995), playwright, Deputy Minister of Culture
- Xia Xi (1901–1936), early leader of the Chinese Communist Party
- Xia Jinxiong (夏晉熊; 1902–?), acting Minister of Finance of the Republic of China
- Xia Jianbai (夏坚白; 1903–1977), academician of the Chinese Academy of Sciences, President of Tongji University
- Xia Chuzhong (1904–1988), Republic of China general
- Xia Zhengnong (夏征农; 1904–2008), writer and politician
- Xia Nai (1910–1985), pioneering archaeologist
- Xia Xiaohua (夏曉華; 1919–2003), founder of the Taiwan Daily and Chengsheng Broadcasting
- Xia Gongquan (夏功权; 1919–2008), Republic of China diplomat
- C. T. Hsia (1921–2013), literary critic and scholar
- Xia Peisu (1923–2014), female computer scientist, academician of the Chinese Academy of Sciences
- Xia Suisheng (1924–2019), surgeon and pioneer in organ transplantation
- Xia Meng (1933–2016), Hong Kong actress and film producer
- Timothy Ha (born 1937), Hong Kong educator
- Ronald Arculli or Xia Jiali (born 1939), former chairman of Hong Kong Exchanges and Clearing
- Xia Taifeng (夏台鳳; born 1949), Taiwanese actress and singer
- Andrew Hsia or Xia Liyan (born 1950), Minister of Mainland Affairs Council of the Republic of China (2015–2016)
- Xia Baolong (born 1952), Communist Party Chief and former Governor of Zhejiang
- Xia Gang (born 1953), film director, winner of Golden Rooster Award for Best Director
- Xia Lingling (夏玲玲; born 1953), Taiwanese actress
- Xia Deren (born 1955), Deputy Communist Party Chief of Liaoning province
- Yuen Biao or Xia Lingzhen (born 1957), Hong Kong actor
- Xia Yeliang (born 1960), former Peking University economist and dissident
- Zhihong Xia (born 1962), Chinese-American mathematician
- Michelle Xia (born 1966/67), Chinese billionaire businesswoman
- Xia Jiaping (born 1969), tennis player
- Ha Hee-ra or Xia Xiluo (born 1969), South Korean actress of Chinese descent
- Tony Xia (born 1976), businessman; owner of Aston Villa F.C.
- Lulu Hsia Chia-lu (夏嘉璐; born 1977), Taiwanese TV Host
- Xia Yu (born 1978), actor
- Xia Xuanze (born 1979), badminton player, world champion
- Xia Da (born 1981), cartoonist
- Xia Ningning (born 1987), football player
- Xia Lina (born 1987), Olympic alpine ski racer
- Xia Kangnan (born 1988), baseball player
- Xia Huan (born 1992), badminton player
- Xia Hanyu (夏瀚宇) (born 1997), singer and dancer. Member of UNINE
- Xia Zhiguang (夏之光) (born 2000), singer and dancer. Member of X-NINE and R1SE
