= Tong Wars =

19th-century disputes between Chinese Americans

Date	1800s–1930s
Location	San Francisco, Los Angeles, Seattle, Chicago, New York

Belligerents
- conflict between Tongs: Bing Kong Tong, Hip Sing Tong, Hop Sing Tong, On Teong Tong, Suey Sing Tong, Ying On Tong

The Tong Wars were a series of violent disputes beginning in the late 19th century among rival Chinese Tong factions centered in the Chinatowns of various American cities, in particular San Francisco. Tong wars could be triggered by a variety of inter-gang grievances, from the public besmirching of another Tong's honor, to failure to make full payment for a "slave girl", to the murder of a rival Tong member. Each Tong had salaried soldiers, known as boo how doy, who fought in Chinatown alleys and streets over the control of opium, prostitution, gambling, and territory.

In San Francisco's Chinatown district, the Tong Wars lasted until 1921, with the various criminal Tongs estimated between nineteen and as many as thirty at the peak of the conflict, though the actual number is uncertain, with frequent splintering and mergers between the various Tongs. While a loose alliance, consisting of the Chinatown police, Donaldina Cameron, the courts, and the Chinese community itself tried to stem the tide of the fighting Tongs, it was the 1906 San Francisco earthquake and subsequent fires caused by the earthquake that was the death knell for the Tongs in San Francisco, as it destroyed the brothels, gambling dens, and opium houses that the criminal organizations had used for the majority of their revenue. Recovery was slow for most Tongs, so they abandoned the old Chinatown.

== Tong structure ==
While diverse, tongs had some similarities. Most tongs did not require new members to be from a specific clan, birthplace, or economic status, since tong members seem to have come from all different aspects of society. Also, while most tong members were Chinese, membership was not limited on the basis of nationality. Japanese, Filipino, and even Caucasians were known, albeit rarely, to join a tong organization. All tongs had harmless and peaceful sounding names, such as The Society of Pure Upright Spirits and the Peace and Benevolence Society, possibly because many of these organizations' original intentions and goals were good. Many of the "traditional" tongs were formed to protect their countrymen from discrimination by others, as well as criminals in general.

The criminal elements of the tongs eventually either found it more profitable to participate in illicit activities, or the criminal elements of the tong wrestled power away. Tongs attempted to corner the market on criminal activities, especially anything that would bring in a nice profit, such as prostitution, opium, gambling, and forcing Chinese merchants to pay protection fees. One interesting aspect of the tongs was that each organization had two to three fluent English speakers, who served a variety of functions for the tong such as skimming local newspapers for mentions of their group, so they could inform their fellow members. They also dealt with the "foreigner" lawyers and Americans if the need arose. Membership numbers varied from as few as 50 to as many as 1,500 members in 1887. It was common for a tong to splinter when it accumulated too many members. One problem that was common throughout the period that would aid in the breakout of wars between the tongs was that some members could be a member of six tongs at any one time, so that if that member was killed by another tong in a war, one of the other tongs he was a member of would, and sometimes did, seek revenge by declaring war.

Only the Hip Sing Tong is known to have established their tong on the East coast, making it the only known bi-coastal tong. A unique aspect of the Chee Kung Tong was that their members used many euphemisms to direct their members, for example: to order a kill on somebody was to "wash his body" (i.e. in his own blood); a rifle was called a "dog"; and, a pistol was suitably nicknamed a "puppy", while bullets and ammo were called "dog feed." When the leader wished for his men to fire, he shouted "let the dogs bark!" Usually, one tong specialized in a specific illegal activity, such as gambling, although some even had legitimate businesses, and some had both, such as the Bo Sin Seer Tong, which ran many gambling dens but also had grocery stores under their ownership. The Wah Ting San Fong Tong and the On Yick Tong were said to specialize in the brothels, with the Kwong Duck Tong and On Leong Tong specializing in sex trafficking of women. Gambling dens were left to the Hip Sing Tong. Most initiation ceremonies were not as elaborate as the first known tong organizations had, as the Chee Kung Tong was quite traditional in this aspect, with accounts stating that the group still used many Triad symbols and signs. While it is uncertain whether or not other tongs adhered to this characteristic as well, the Chee Kung Tong headquarters would not observe any traditional Chinese holidays, and would only fly their flag full mast when it was a tong holiday, or when war was on the horizon.

=== Soldiers ===
The hatchet men, also known to outsiders of the Chinatown as highbinders (so called as they would bind their queue on top of their heads to prevent them from being grabbed by an opponent), were the salaried soldiers of the tongs. These soldiers most likely were from the Chinese lower classes, as many were uneducated and less "motivated" to become a law-abiding citizen of any country. Allegedly, 20% of each of the tong's membership population was said to be the professional soldiers. Known to Chinese as the boo how doy, these men formed the professional toughs of the tong, and usually carried out their missions with precision and fearlessness. It is said that many hatchet men just prior to an assassination mission or battle with a rival tong would consume wildcat meat, in hopes that they would temporarily acquire the reflexes and sight of the animal.

The boo how doy used a variety of weapons to accomplish their bloody deeds, ranging from small knives to hatchets (by far their favorite melee weapon) in the close quarter department, and they seem to have taken a particular fondness to the Colt .45 revolver for their longer range needs. The hatchet that the highbinders used was somewhat modified from what one usually thinks of a hatchet, as they would cut much of the handle off just enough to have a good grip, and cut a hole into it. The hatchet men were also known to use many different materials as body armor, with varying success.

== San Francisco before the Tong Wars (1850–1860) ==
San Francisco's Chinatown prior to the Tong Wars of the 1880s was relatively peaceful. Chinatown's boundaries ran from Broadway, California, Kearny, and Stockton Streets with about a dozen blocks making up the Chinatown Quarter. In the early 1850s, the state of California probably never had a population of more than 25,000 Chinese on any given day. The majority of Chinese held that their stay in America was temporary, solely to acquire money. They were termed sojourners, as most who made the journey were males, either with a family back in the old country awaiting their return, or young Chinese looking to make their fortune and retire easy back home.

In the 1850s and the decade succeeding it, the criminal class in Chinatown was very small, with virtually no major type of crimes such as murder, rape, armed robbery, or assault. Petty crime was frequent in the Chinese block, and could be divided into four categories: lotteries and gambling, opium smoking, prostitution, and minor thievery. The trade in slave-girls was not "big business" during these times, but it was present. Opium was brought to San Francisco on the clipper Ocean Pearl in 1861, and use of the depressant increased gradually, with estimates ranging from 16%–40% of the total Chinese population being opium users, and 10%–20% of the total Chinese population being termed "far gone addicts."

== Anti-Asian movement (1862–1877) ==
Anti-Asian sentiment began in the early 1860s, and lasted until the late 1870s. Prior to this, the Chinese were generally tolerated within society, and some groups even formed to protect them. One such group was called the Chinese Protective Society, a group that protected Asians from hoodlums, and in its first and only year of operation, it spent about six thousand dollars doing its duty. However, many Chinese were unsure and cautious, and only donated what would amount to about a tenth of their first year operation costs, and it was quickly forced to dissolve due to lack of funds. In California during the 1860s and 1870s, much of this previous tolerance was cast off and Chinese found themselves scapegoats. The first real fires were ignited by groups such as the Knights of Labor, who believed that the Chinese were being used as cheap alternative labor, and began marching to demand the expulsion of Chinese from American soil.

The Depression of 1873 intensified anti-Asian feeling with various groups of hoodlums vandalizing Chinese-run facilities, and 1873 was also the year of the Queue Ordinance, where if one was arrested for any crime, the authorities would then cut off the offender's queue. This did not affect the Chinese population as much as the Disinterment Ordinance did. This ordinance slapped on a heavy penalty for shipping the remains of the dead back to China, anywhere from $100–$150 per offense. It was not only parties and groups of marauding hoodlums who took advantage of the vulnerable Chinese, as even many politicians, to increase their public audience, joined in. Two scares also occurred in the 1870s pertaining to Chinatown, both dealing with the false rumor of leprosy and then smallpox epidemics breaking out within the block. Anti-Asian parties began to spring up, with the inception of the People's Protective Alliance, People's Reform Party, and the straightforward Anti-Chinese Party during this period. People with anti-Asian tendencies also liked to point out the increasing prostitution in Chinatown. The ratio of Chinese men to Chinese women throughout this period was vastly disproportionate, with even moderate estimates of the population stating that nine out of every 10 people in the Quarter were male. The tongs would use this social dilemma to make an immense amount of money through prostitution.

The Six Companies, representing practically all Chinese in California, tried to work with local governments in attempts to quell the movements against Asians. The Six Companies were formed to help the Chinese come from and return to China, to take care of the sick and the starving, and to return corpses to China for burial. Later, they tried to protect their people from the abuses San Francisco's Chinese suffered at the hands of racist hoodlums. They were run by the richer and better educated among the immigrants, in the paternalistic manner typical of 19th-century Chinese society. While the Six Companies was preoccupied with the Anti-Asian movements being forced upon them, the fighting tongs were rapidly growing. With the Six Companies busy fighting against the groups who wished for their people to be kicked out of the country, the Chinatown police squad, after many years of little to no violence, had grown quite lax, which had lulled them into failure to act upon the creation of the tongs and their subsequent rise.

== Rise of the Tongs ==
The first tong known to be created was the Chee Kung Tong, the founder of which was Low Yet, a Cantonese leader in the Reds Turban Rebellion (1854–1856) who had to flee China before the rebellion was crushed, and went on to create the Chee Kungs. Quickly the Chee Kung Tong had reaped the rewards of its activities, so much so that it was able to remove the unhappy portions of their membership base. Many of those members who left came to form the tongs that would rival that of their previous one. One reason previously theorized as to why the Tong Wars did not begin earlier was in the 1850s and 1860s there were not enough soldiers for them to fight and run the tong the way it was in the later years, and because most of the Chinese gangs founded in the United States were full-fledged ABCs (American-Born Chinese). An interesting note to the Chee Kung Tong was that in June 1885, they welcomed an eighteen-year-old Chinese to their headquarters during his three-month stay in the United States. This man, named Sun Tai Cheon, better known as Sun Yat-Sen, the founder of the Chinese Republic, learned of the American democratic system as well as accepted the first part of the Chee Kung Tong's "Down with the Manchus!" and set about to bring these ideals to China.

By 1854, three tongs had begun to flourish in the San Francisco area those being the Chee Kung, Hip Yee, and the Kwong Duck. The Hip Yee and Kwong Duck Tongs were both reported to have had a morally decent and good organization, with the Hip Yee tong starting out to protect slave-girls from criminal activities (although the Hip Yee highbinders were said to have started the organized slave-girl importation in 1852 as well), and the Kwong Duck tong's creation was motivated by originally good men to fight the illegal activities of the Hip Yee Tong. Regardless, both tongs and for that matter every tong created during this period eventually turned to criminal activities. The major markets that brought such a rapid rise in the tongs were, as mentioned before, the fan-tan gambling halls and lotteries, opium dens, and the most important to the tongs, the slave-girl (prostitution) houses. The tongs were said to have collected a tax of forty cents per prostitute upon their importation to the country and two cents per week from each slave-girl after that. It is quite understandable how the prostitution business was so profitable by the mere overview of the Chinese population throughout the period, with 30,360 males and only 1,385 females (with perhaps as much as 50% of the women being prostitutes) in the Chinatown in 1884. There were also minor cash markets in the form of protection money from the various Chinese merchants, store owners and shopkeepers in the Chinese Quarter.

== Partial collapse of the Six Companies ==
The Six Companies attempted to fight the rising power of the tongs with little overall success, but held them in check until the 1880s. One incident in which the Six Companies met with success in occurred in 1862. They fought against illegal prostitution and made efforts to send abandoned slave-girls back to the old country. Their success was noticed and praised by the state legislature. But attempts to send back these girls sometimes were thwarted by American businessmen with vested interests in the Chinatown Red Light District. In such failure, they tried on numerous occasions for the United States and China to work on an extradition treaty that would send many of the criminal boo how doy back to China upon criminal offense, which would have caused illegal activities in the Quarter to drop, was denied by the United States. Many politicians in California viewed the Six Companies with dissatisfaction, believing that they had despotic powers which they did not, and that they usurped some of the very powers of the local government, such as the belief that the Six Companies held their own trials, had control in some of the less criminal activities such as gambling, as well as affected their own punishments against those who their courts deemed guilty.

The Six Companies battled the tongs for fifty years, and while moderately successful from 1850 to the 1870s, the criminal elements began to grow exponentially around 1880. The Six Companies was a paternal order that set up the rules and regulations of their society without consenting to the will of their people, in exchange for security and protection. They grouped together to be able to form a single cohesive group to fight against the cases of bigotry, violence, or decrees they deemed infringing upon their rights. The Six Companies were at first known as the Kong Chow Company. The six were: the Sam Yup Company, See Yup Company, Ning Yuen Company, Yeung Wo Company, Hop Wo Company, and Hip Kat Company. The Six Companies could be divided into two groups based on dialects as well. The Sam Yups spoke the Cantonese dialect; the more numerous See Yups, spoke the more common tongue of Mandarin.

By the 1890s, the leaders of the Companies only served a single term, as prior to the term limit to one term there was an unlimited amount of time one could serve, and corruption had slowly found its way in. Many times, both the police and politicians put unwarranted blame on the Six Companies, as the organization to outsiders was shrouded in mystery. One such instance was in 1876, when the state legislature put total blame on the Six Companies after an investigation mistakenly blamed them for controlling the criminal elements of their society, including the fighting tong. But the Six Companies truthfully had no power over the tongs, and attempted to end the tongs criminal acts at every opportunity, even posting the information of delinquents and offering rewards for more information as to their whereabouts leading to their capture. The one true power the Six Companies had was the exit visa power. The exit visa tax was a receipt, which was proof that they had repaid all their debts, and they could go home. This was later taken away by Chief of Police Patrick Crowley, who instead of focusing on the warring tongs, aided in the promulgation of the Felton Act, which removed the power of the exit visa from the Companies.

The collapse of the Chinese Consolidated Benevolent Association came about when the Geary Act passed as it was the one true occasion when the Companies pressured the whole community to protest it by not registering, as well as donating a dollar each for the employment of lawyers to fight for their rights. The leader of the opposition to the Geary Act was Chun Ti Chu, and when the Six Companies lost the battle against the Act and many U.S. officials pointed out that the Six Companies had informed their members to violate the laws of the United States, both Chun Ti Chu and the Chinese Consolidated Benevolent Association had taken a huge loss of face to their society. Quickly, the tongs published that they would pay $300 for Chun's head. Chun Ti Chu was not deterred, and continued his fight against the tongs. Immediately after the severe loss of face and prestige for the Six Companies in their protest of the Geary Act in 1893–1894, the criminal element of the Chinese finally burst its seams and the tong wars erupted onto the streets and alleys of Chinatown, as well as the newspapers of the country. The Tong Wars flourished during this period. But one more blow to the Six Companies would come, after the death of Fung Jing Toy, also known as Little Pete.

The last major blow to the Six Companies was a boycott of See Yup products and stores after the murder of Fung Jing Toy (Little Pete) in January 1897, which ground the economy of the whole Quarter to a halt. A neutral Chinese Consul General, Ho Yow, who knew that the boycott was a serious feature in the strength of the tongs, attempted to bring the two sides to the peace table and nearly succeeded. Ho persistently sought an end to the boycott, and throughout his Consulship fought the tongs. The internal fighting between the two major groups of the Six Companies would last until 1899 at least, with various tongs encouraging the fight so that the Companies would remain weak. Many people, in the face of the escalating tong wars, emigrated away from San Francisco and the United States altogether after the Six Companies was defeated.

== Tong Wars (1880–1913) ==
Tong wars were fought not only on the streets and alleys of the Chinatown, but also on the rooftops in a deadly guerrilla warfare. Often, a tong war began over a woman, whether the failure of one tong to fully pay another tong for a slave-girl (as in the case of the Bing On Tong–Wah Sin San Fan Tong War) or simply because of limited number of Chinese women in the area during the time (Hop Sing Tong–Suey Sing Tong War). Other tong wars started due to issues from defamation of a rival tong's "face" to attempting to take another tong's business. The Bing On Tong–Wah Sin San Fan Tong War was caused when Bing On sold the girl to a Wah Ting member but he did not pay the full amount specified, and the Bing Ons demanded that the bill be paid. The Wah Tings replied that the girl was not even worth $500 and if they wanted to do something about it they were welcome to try at their own risk.

The Hop Sing Tong–Suey Sing Tong War was particularly bloody. By the time a truce was signed, four Hop Sings lay dead and four more were wounded compared to the Suey Sings' two dead, one wounded. This ongoing war was particularly bloody, as even though the truce was signed, they went back to war two more times, including one of a three-month duration in 1900, which produced even deadlier results: seven dead in total, eight wounded and not a single murderer captured by police. The other each killed one member of the other group, and the Hop Sings attempted to dynamite their rivals' headquarters.

In other cases, the tongs went to war with one another and brought their allies with them. Such was the case in the Bo Leong Tong–Bo On Tong War, with the Bo Leong's supporters being the On Yick Tong and Hop Sing Tong, to do battle against the Bo On as well as their supporters, the Suey Sing Tong and Hip Sing Tong. Another example would be the Wah Ting San Fong Tong and the Sen Suey Ying Tong allying with the Hop Sings to fight the Suey Sing Tong. The Chinese population of the San Francisco Chinatown and of the United States dropped dramatically during this turbulent era, from as many as 25,000 to only 14,000 by the beginning of 1900, with the Chinese U.S. population dropping by 16% during this time.

Some officials and scholars began to attempt to rank the tongs in terms of who was the bloodiest. One study came out with the Do On Tong and the Suey Sing Tong on top, while another stated by a Chinatown officer was that the top tongs were the Bing On and the Gee Sin Seer, led by Little Pete. But it should be said that never throughout the Tong Wars did a single tong gain supremacy over all others.

As stated previously, there were cases of a war between two tongs widening due to the fact that any member could be a part of up to six tongs. An example was the Hip Sing Tong–Hop Sing Tong War, in which a Hop Sing killed a member of the Hip Sings, but he also turned out to be a prominent member of the Sen Suey Ying Tong, so they then joined the fray. Later in that same war, a Sen Suey Ying member went to go curse a Hop Sing member, then was ambushed in a temple and mortally wounded, which then brought the Chee Kung Tong into the mix as that man was a member of their tong as well.

== Fall of the Tongs ==
Members of the San Francisco Police Chinatown Squad, 1905

Forces consisting of a militant style police force, Donaldina Cameron, and members of the Chinese community finally united against the tongs, which along with the 1906 San Francisco earthquake brought the end of the tongs and the Tong Wars. Legislation that passed enforcing stricter control of the opium dens and brothels in the 1890s were a factor as well. The Presbyterian and Methodist Missions, led by Donaldina Cameron, had saved at least eighteen slave girls. The Chinese Consul General, Ho Yow, repeatedly attacked the tongs and their activities through posters, and Chun Ti Chu, while leader of the Six Companies, forbid any tong member from joining the company. William B. Farwell's report of 1885 on Chinatown detailed a building by building survey of Chinatown, color-coded to show the geography of crime in Chinatown. This report, coupled with Officer Price's transformation of the Chinatown squad into a flying squad (flying squads usually dealt with riots), earned Price the name of "White Devil" to the tongs, as he used the squad to raid tong headquarters, and immediately went on the offensive and destroyed the Bing On and Suey On tong headquarters in the early 1890s, and would continue to do so until his retirement in 1905, on the eve of the earthquake.

The earthquake, on April 18, 1906, killed about 3,000 people, and its subsequent fires destroyed the Chinatown ghettos, gambling halls, and brothels. This was the death knell for the warring tongs, as many of their staple sources of income never were able to come back. Recovery was slow, most tongs just simply went away with the old Chinatown. The Kwong Duck tong boasted one member after the earthquake, Wong Sing, who held the tong seal, books, flag, and all offices.

The hatchet men were already aging by this time. Some of the boo how doy were extradited, some were dead, and some left for other cities such as Chicago, New York City, Seattle, Portland, Oakland, and Los Angeles. The ones in New York City and Chicago kept up the Tong Wars for another ten to twenty years, with a little bit of Chicago-style gangsterism, but they too died down. There were a few Tong Wars after 1906, but Inspector Jack Manion, leader of the Chinatown squad forced the last six tongs (Hop Sings, Suey Sings, Suey Dongs, Sen Suey Yings, Jun Yings and Bing Kong) to form a Peace Committee in 1913. Afterwards, the San Francisco Chinatown had quieted down, with its last tong related murder in 1921, and by 1925 the last of the slave-girl raids occurred.

== Known Tongs ==
- On Leong Tong (安良堂)
- Po Sang Tong
- Bo Sin Seer (保善社)
- Suey Sing Tong (萃勝堂)
- Hip Sing Tong (協勝堂)
- Suey On Tong (瑞端堂)
- Gee Sin Seer (至善社)
- Sen Suey Ying Tong
- Ying On Tong (英端堂)
- Hop Sing Tong (合勝堂)
- Jun Ying Tong (俊英堂)
- Wing Yee Tong
- Chee Kung Tong (致公堂)
- Hip Sen Tong (協善堂)
- Si On Tong
- Wah Ting San Fong (華亭山房)
- Kim Lan Wui Saw (金蘭會所)
- Bo On Tong (保安堂)
- Suey Dong Tong
- Suey Ying Tong (萃英堂)
- Bo Leong Tong (保良堂)
- Sai Sin Tong
- On Yick Tong (安益堂)
- Hip Yee Tong (協義堂)
- Bing Kong Tong (秉公堂)
- Kwong Duck Tong (廣德堂)

== Notable participants ==
- Patrick Crowley, chief of police
- Little Pete (Fung Jing Toy), founder and leader of the Gee Sin Seer tong, also known as "The King of Chinatown"
- Low Yet, founder and president of the first tong, the Chee Kung Tong
- Chun Ti Chu, leader of the Chinese Consolidated Benevolent Association, also known as the Six Companies
- William Price
- Willard B. Farwell
- Donaldina Cameron
- Jack Manion, inspector who ended the Tong Wars
- Ho Yow, Chinese consul general
- Leung Ying, former Hop Sing Tong member turned mass murderer

== Other cities ==
In New York City, the Fourth Tong War ended only in 1933, although for the last decade the conflicts had been unofficial.

== In popular culture ==
The Tong wars are depicted in the final act of the 1928 film The Cameraman, starring Buster Keaton.

Cinemax produced a television series inspired by a Bruce Lee creation titled Warrior. The series focused on the San Francisco Tongs in the late 1800s.

In the fictional DC character Superman's city, Metropolis, the Tong Wars are given as an explanation for the existence of underground tunnels connecting Chinese homes and businesses in Chinatown.

== See also ==
- Hui
- List of Chinese criminal organizations
- List of criminal enterprises, gangs and syndicates
- Triad
