= Isleton Chinese and Japanese Commercial Districts =

Historic district in California, United States

- U.S. National Register of Historic Places
- U.S. Historic district
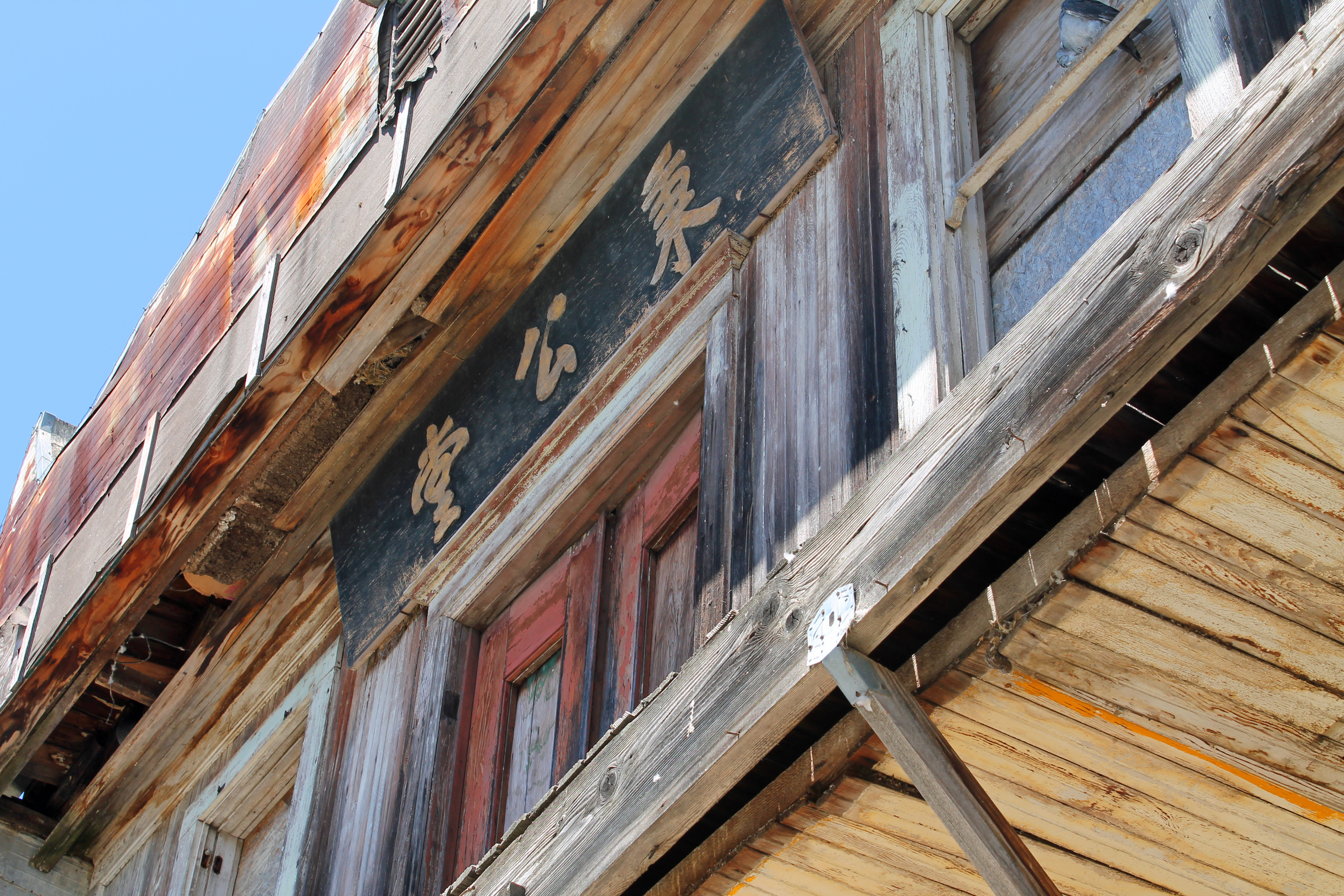

- Location within San Francisco Bay Area Location within California Location within the United States
- Location: Bounded by River Rd. and Union, E and H Sts., Isleton, California
- Coordinates: 38°9′45″N 121°36′18″W
- Area: 6 acres (2.4 ha)
- Built by: Adams, Noah Lumber Co.
- Architectural style: Chicago, Commercial Style
- NRHP reference No.: 91000297
- Added to NRHP: March 14, 1991

The Isleton Chinese and Japanese Commercial Districts is located in Isleton, California in the Sacramento–San Joaquin River Delta, a large agricultural area in Sacramento County, California. Also known as the Isleton Asian American District, it served as the commercial and social center for both the town's Chinese and Japanese residents and the laborers working in nearby canneries, farms, and ranches. Isleton Asian American District is the only Asian community built in the Delta during the 1920s, and the architectural style of the buildings in the districts, particularly the use of pressed tin siding, is unique to other Delta Asian communities and to the town of Isleton.

Isleton's Chinese and Japanese Commercial Districts, while sharing a main street, were considered two distinct areas. They were listed as one historic district on the National Register of Historic Places in 1991. The listing includes 41 contributing buildings on 6 acres (2.4 ha), including a building used by the Bing Kong Tong at 29 Main Street.

Having over 50 original buildings that were built after a fire on May 30, 1926, the two block segment of Main Street was primarily divided; the Japanese-Americans owned homes and businesses on one side while the Chinese-Americans used the other.

After the internment of Japanese-Americans, the area never reclaimed its former multi-ethnic population.

== Gallery ==
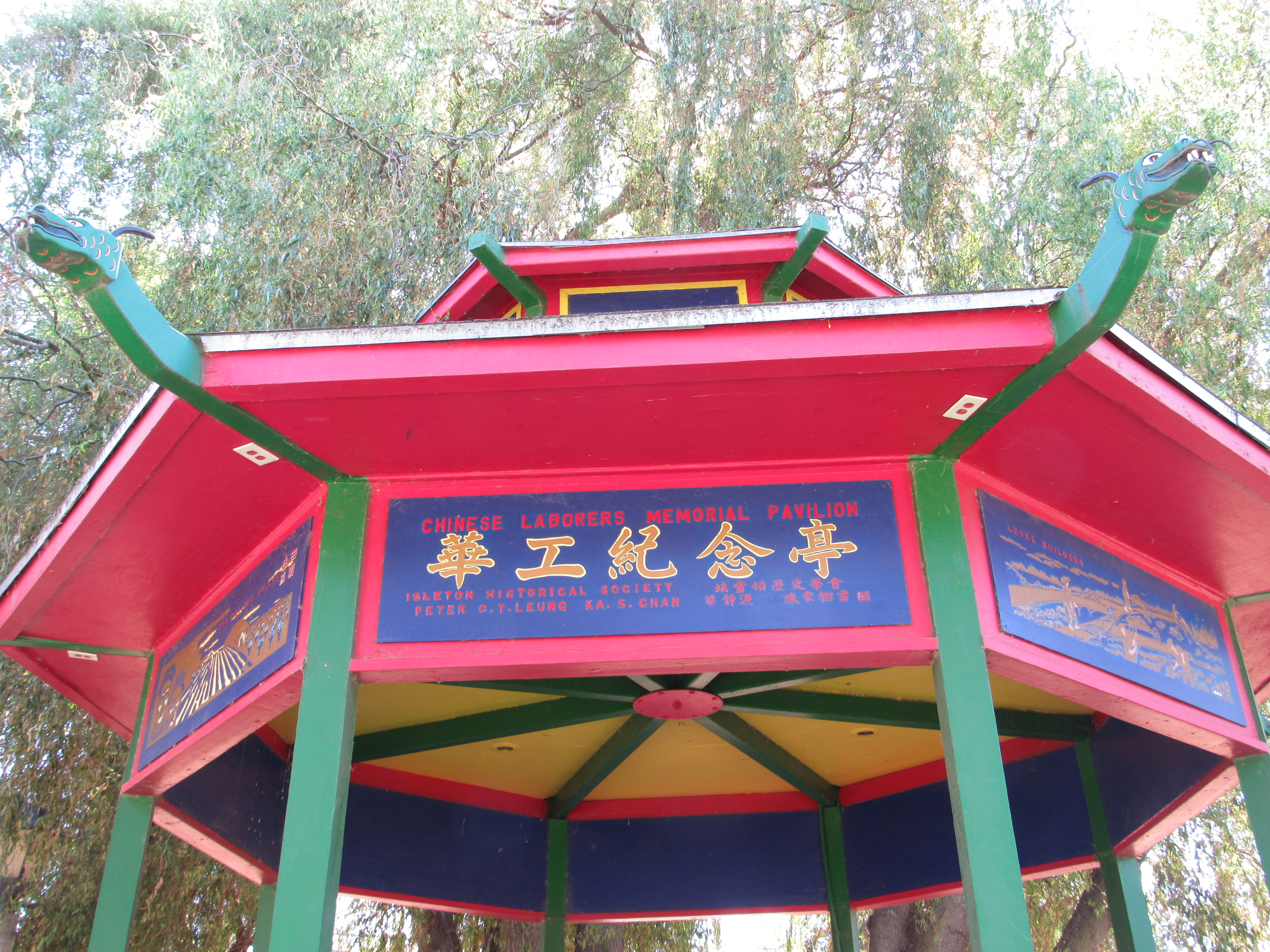
Chinese Laborer’s Memorial Pavilion at Isleton City Park

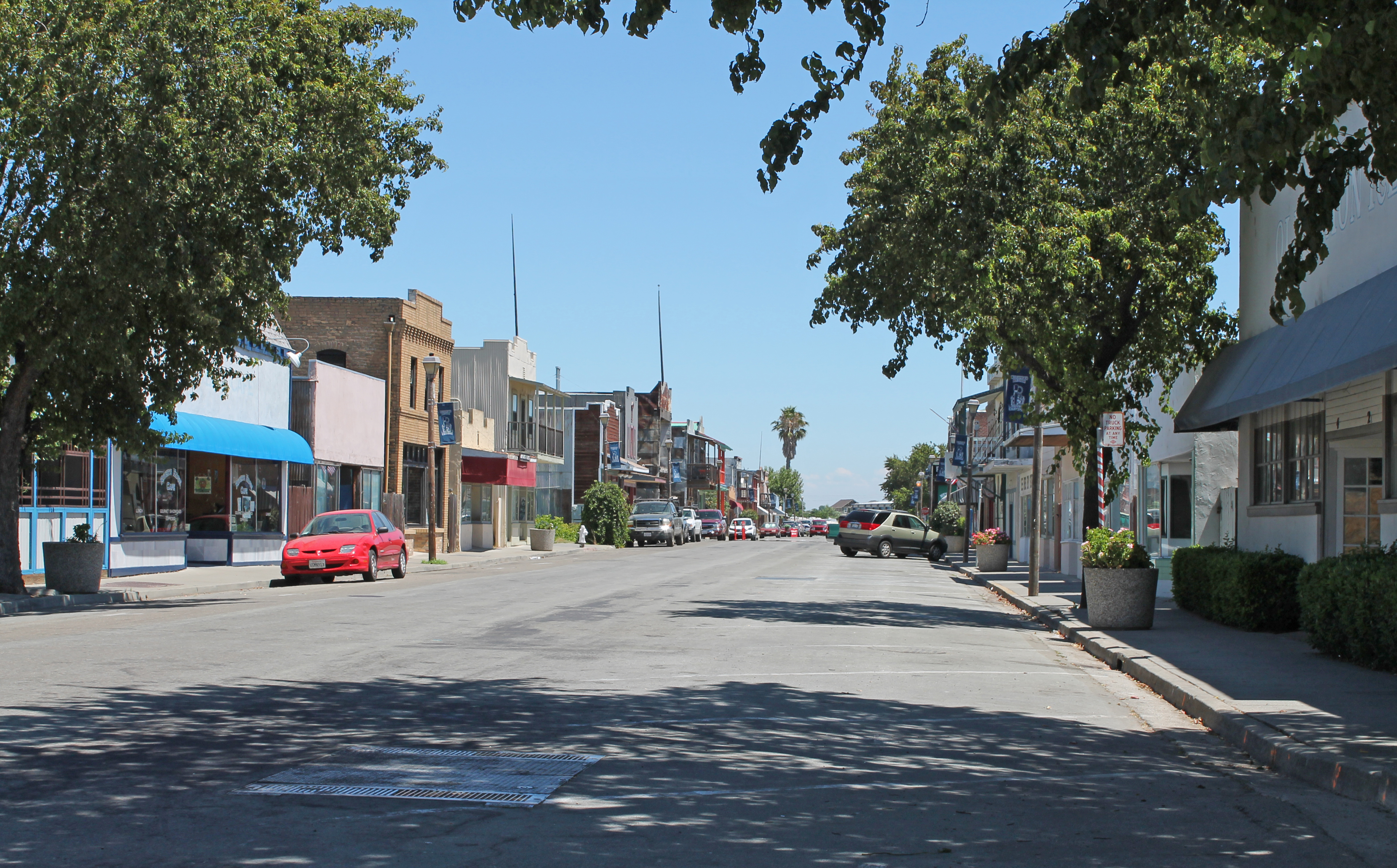
Isleton Chinese and Japanese Commercial Districts main street

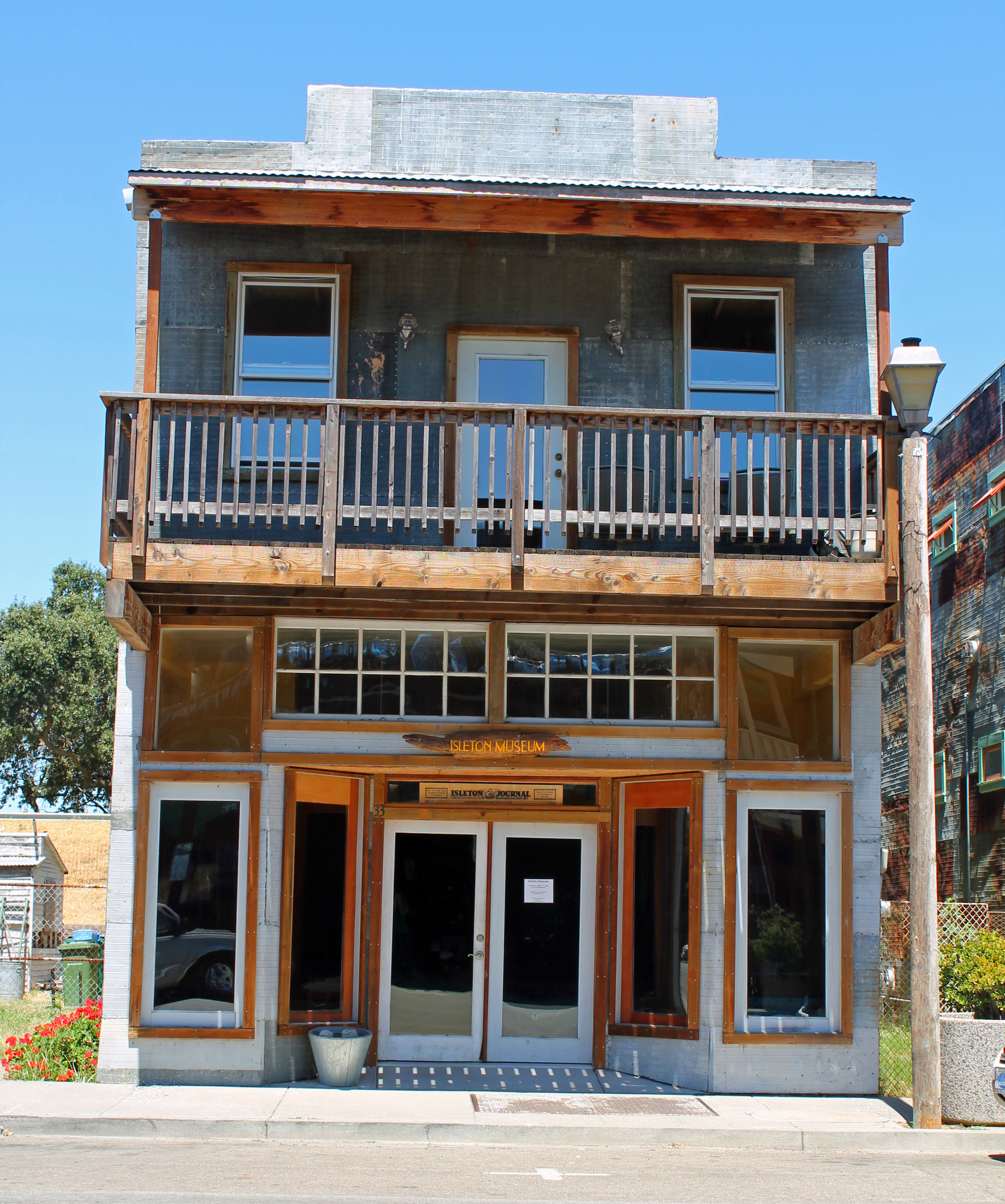
Chinese-style building

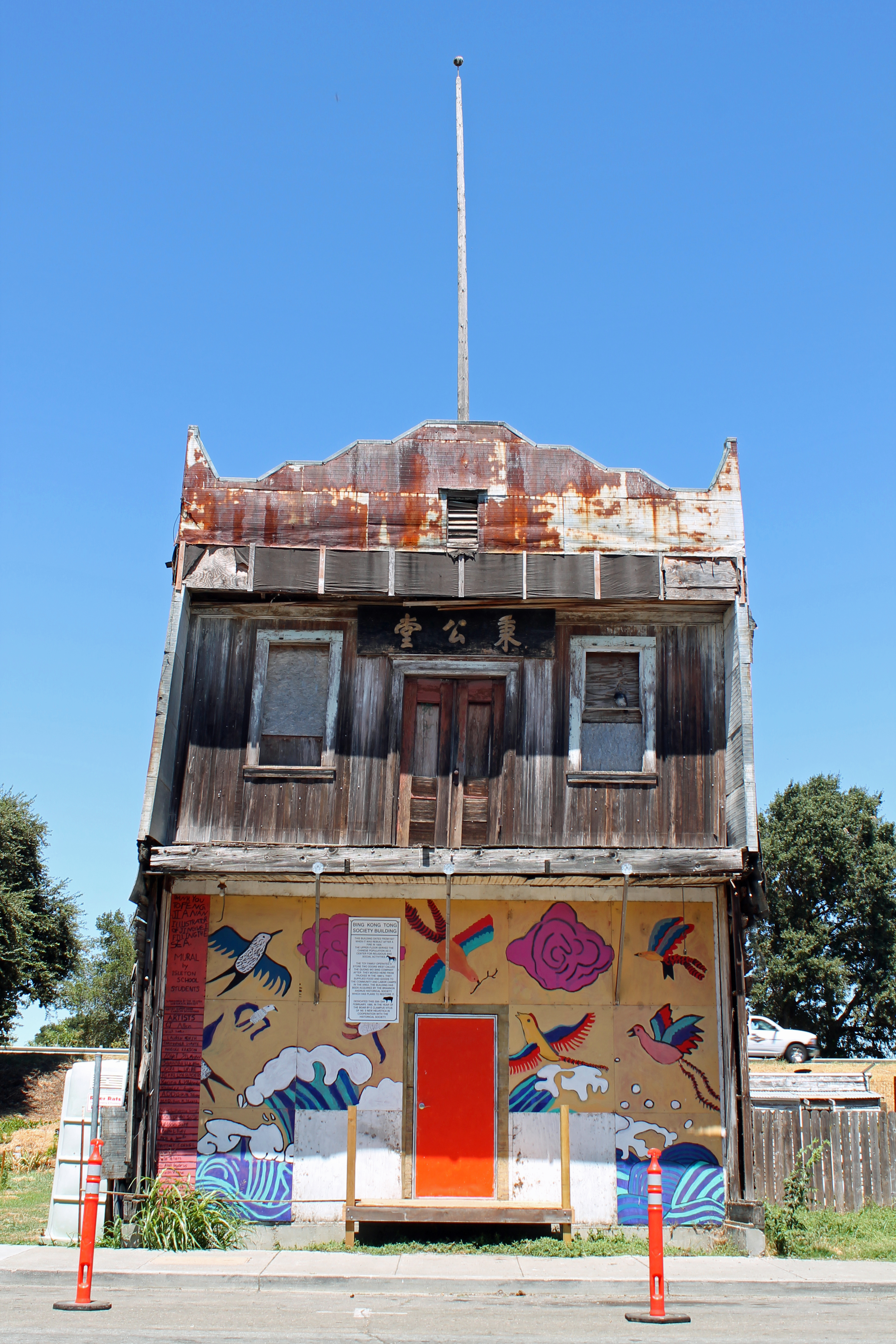
Bing Kong Tong Society building

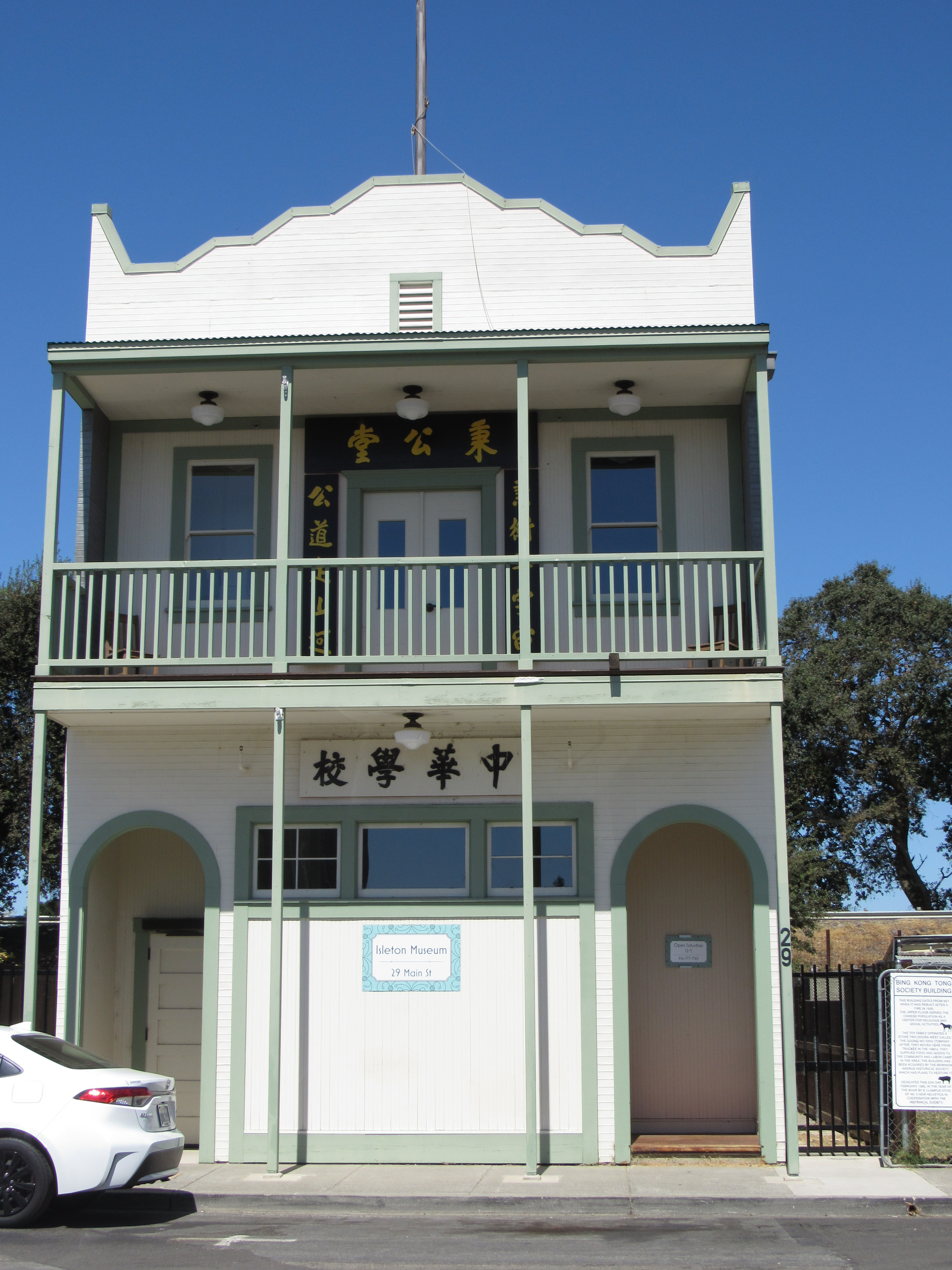
Bing Kong Tong Society Building restored for Isleton Museum

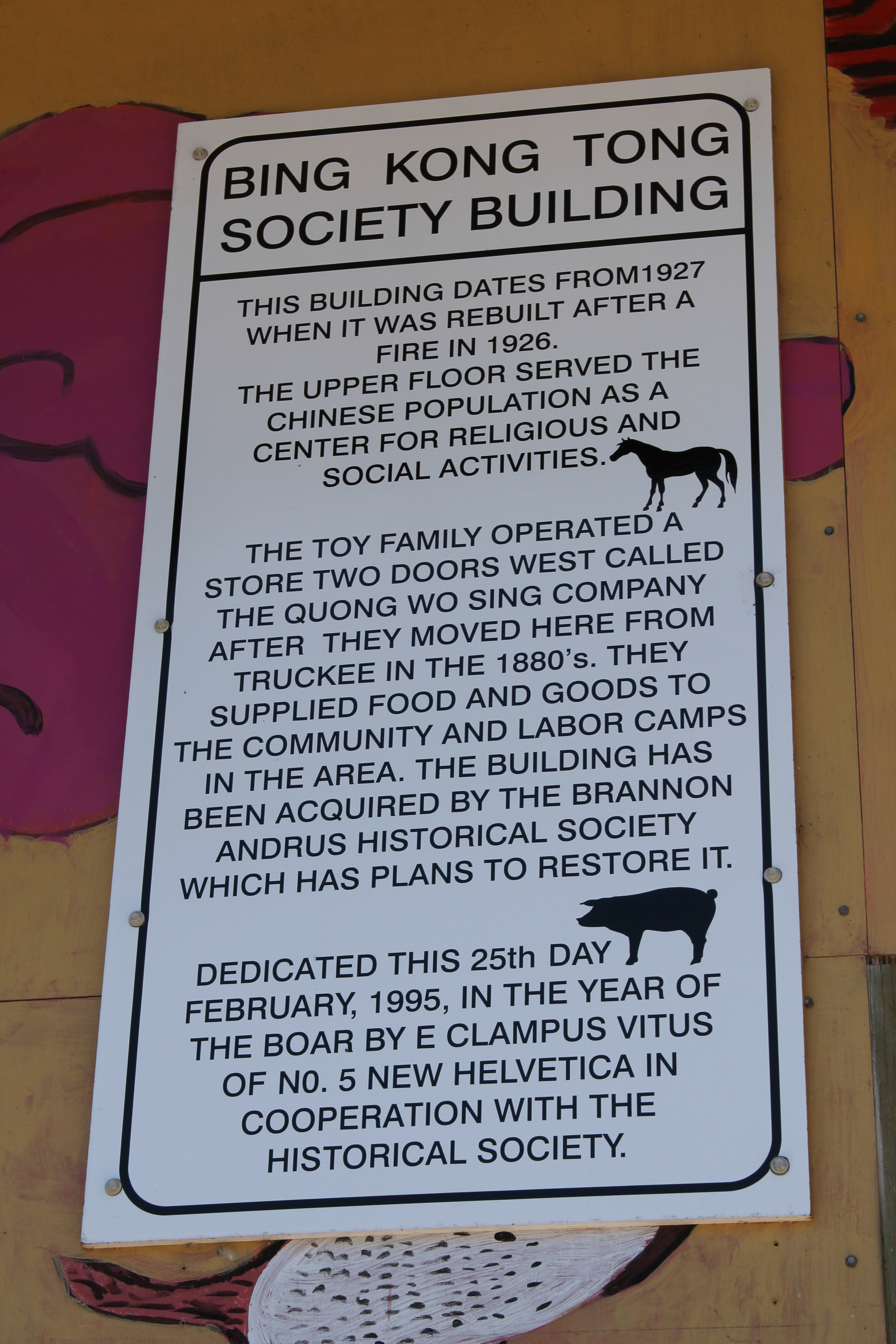
Interpretive sign for Bing Kong Tong Society building

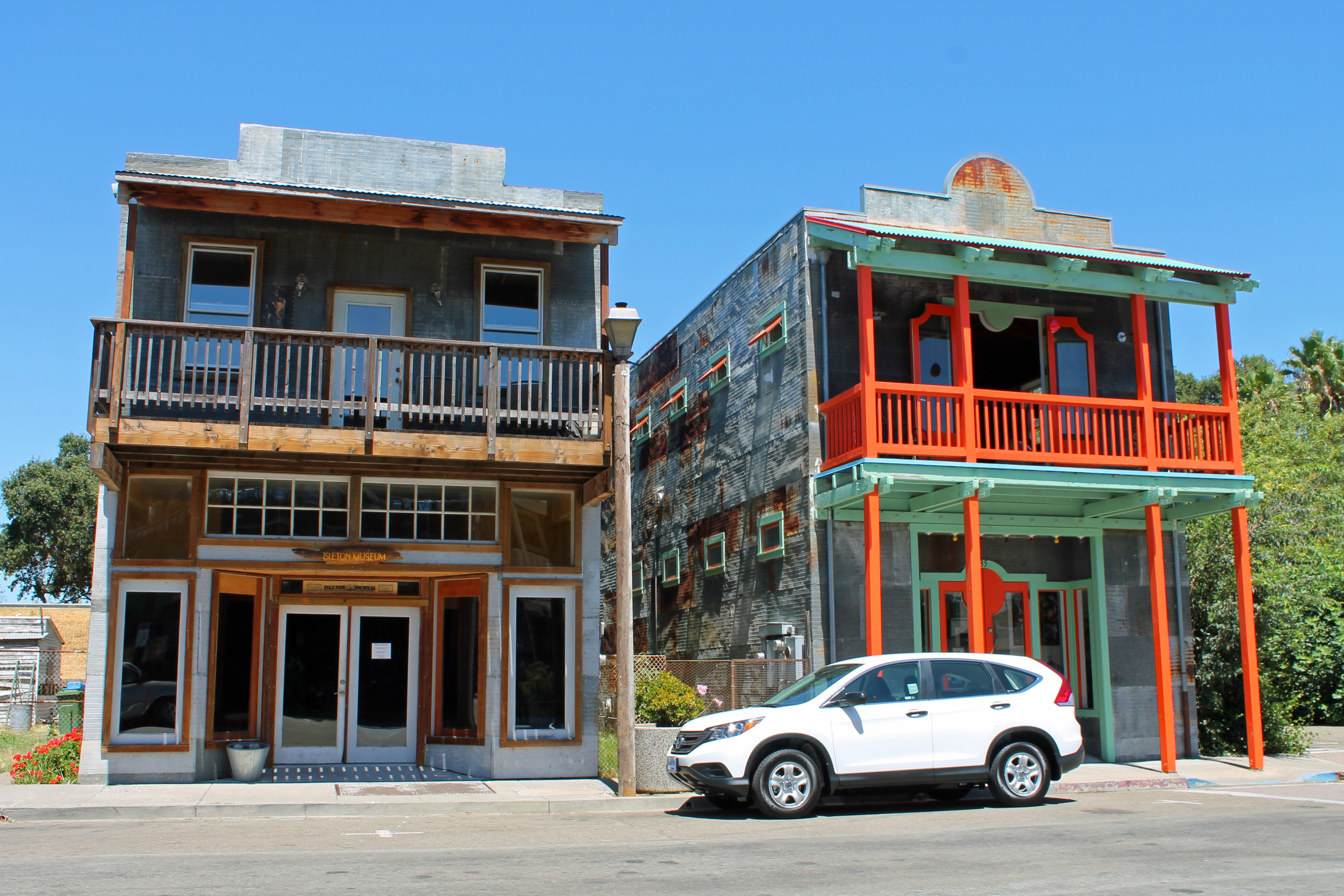
Chinese-style buildings. The one on the left has traditional tin siding.

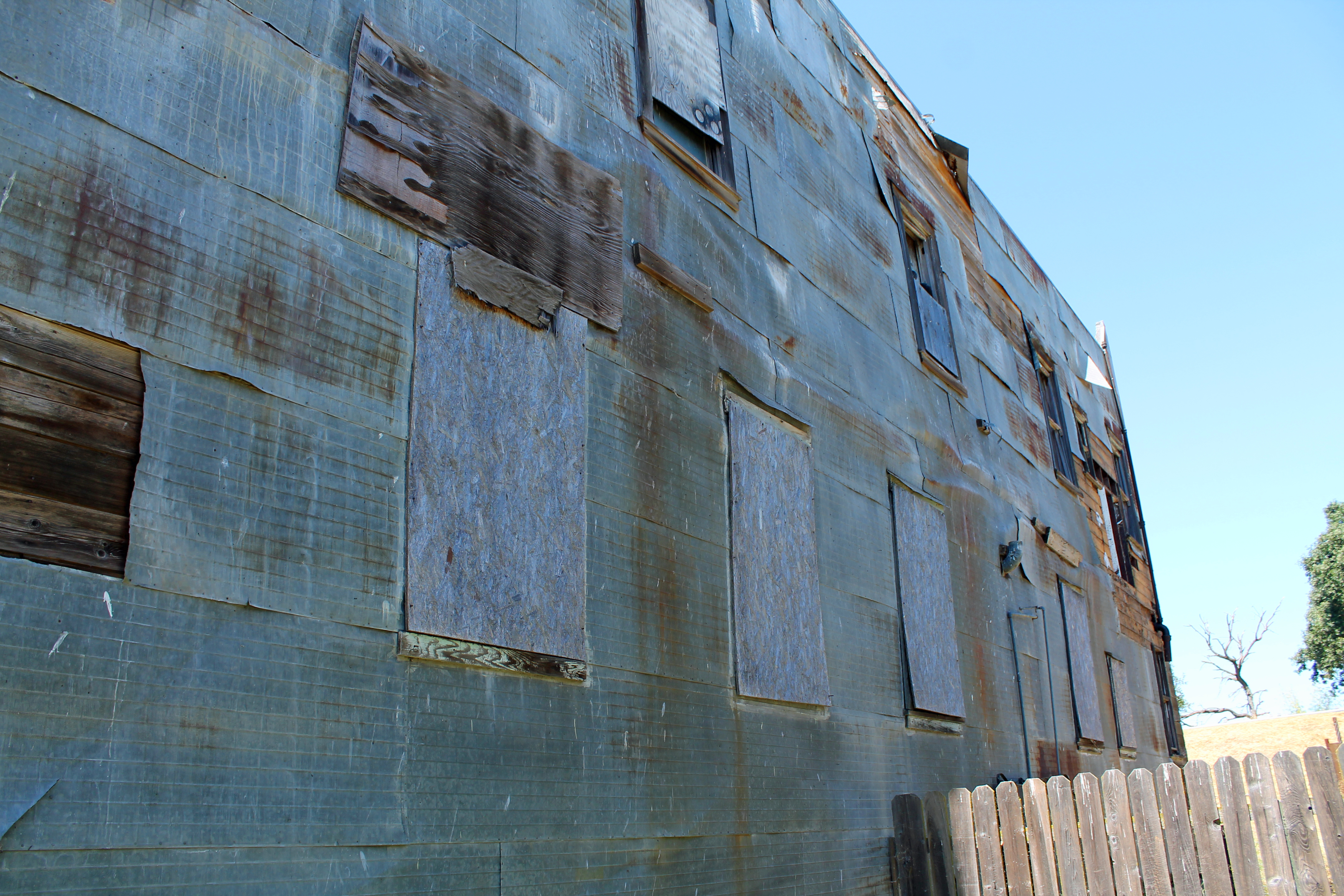
Historic tin siding on building. Pressed tin was used to fire proof many of the wooden buildings after the 1926 fire.

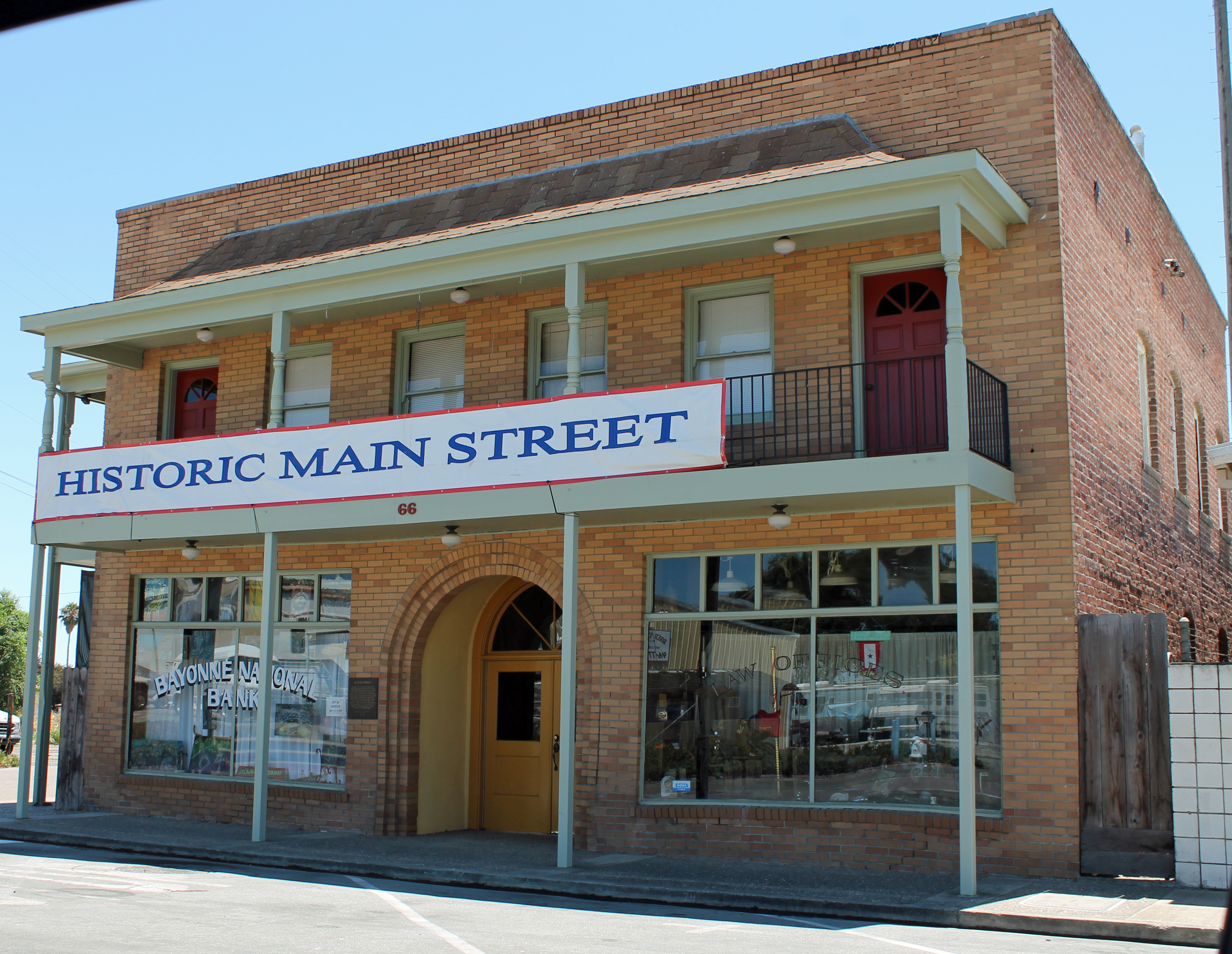
Brick building with second-story balconies typical of buildings in the Chinese section.

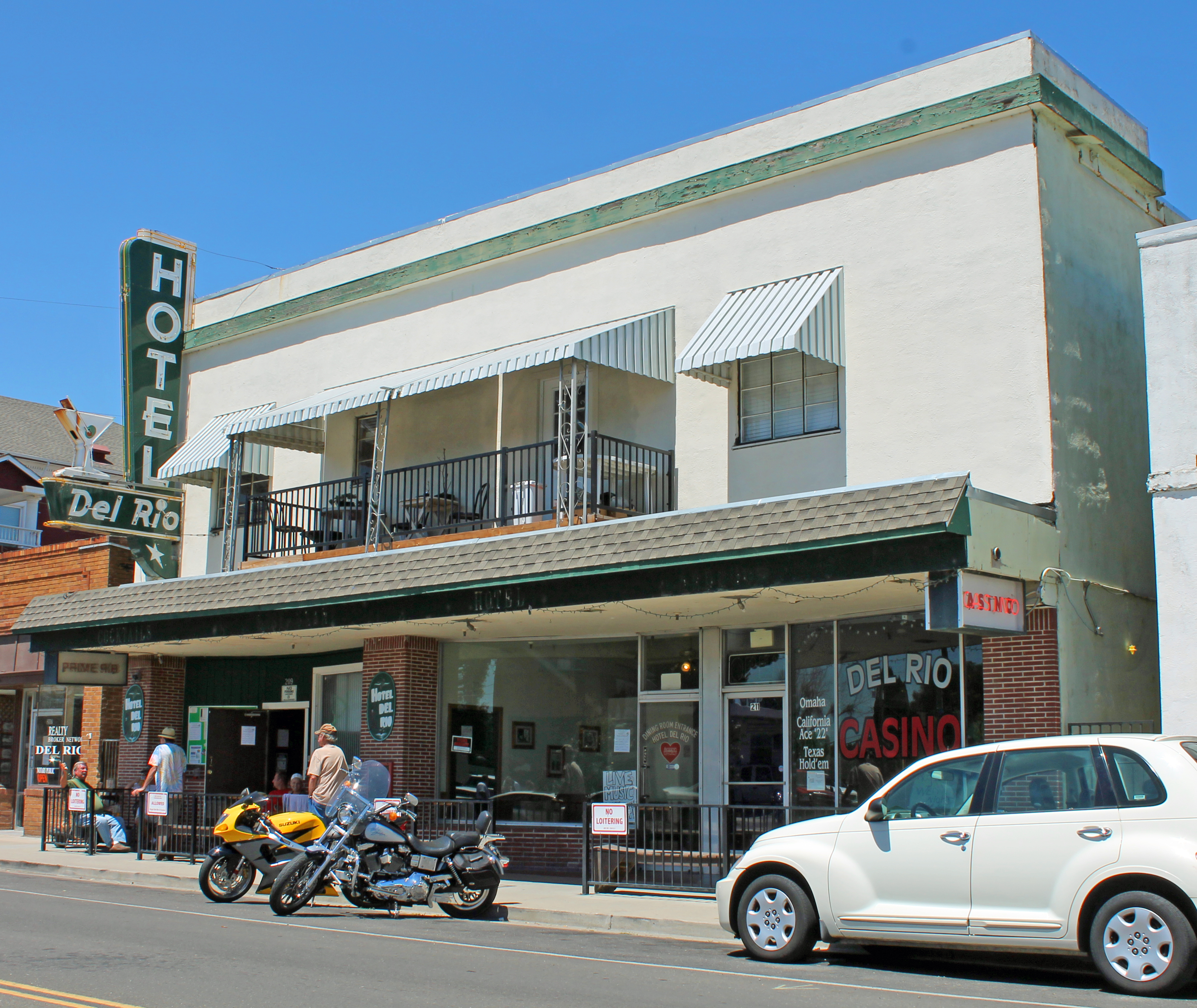
Hotel Del Rio
