= Wang Kaiyun =

- 王闓運
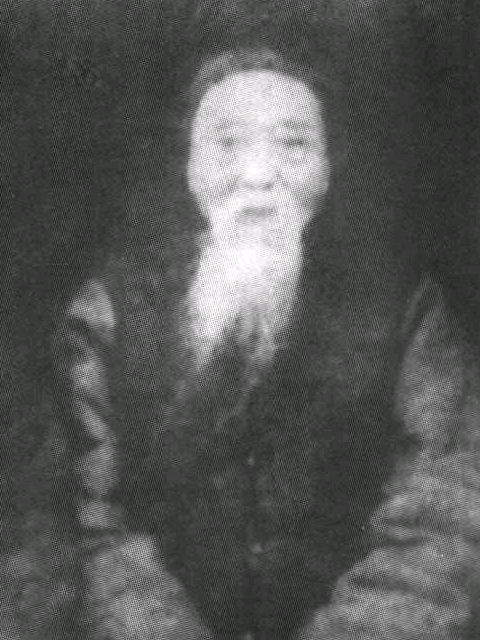
- Wang Kaiyun
- Born: 1833; Xiangtan, Hunan, Qing China
- Died: 1916 (aged 82–83); Xiangtan, Hunan, Republic of China
- Occupations: Scholar, litterateur

Academic work
- Discipline: History of China; Chinese literature
- Institutions: Xiangqilou
- Notable students: Qi Baishi; Yang Du; Liu Guangdi; Xia Shoutian

Chinese name
- Traditional Chinese: 王闓運
- Simplified Chinese: 王闿运
Transcriptions
Standard Mandarin
- Hanyu Pinyin: Wáng Kǎiyùn

Renqiu
- Chinese: 壬秋
Transcriptions
Standard Mandarin
- Hanyu Pinyin: Rénqiū

Renfu
- Chinese: 壬父
Transcriptions
Standard Mandarin
- Hanyu Pinyin: Rénfù

Xiangqilou
- Traditional Chinese: 湘綺樓
- Simplified Chinese: 湘绮楼
Transcriptions
Standard Mandarin
- Hanyu Pinyin: Xiāngqǐlóu

Wang Kaiyun (Chinese: 王闓運; 1833 – 1917), courtesy name Renqiu and Renfu, was a Chinese scholar and litterateur.

== Biography ==
Wang was born in Xiangtan, Hunan, in 1833. In 1857, he achieved the rank of Juren. When Zeng Guofan began suppressing the Taiping Rebellion, he served as a strategic adviser for him. Later, he taught at Zunjing Academy in Chengdu, Sixian Academy in Changsha, and Chuanshan Academy in Hengyang. In 1913, he was hired by Yuan Shikai as curator of the Academia Historica. He also served as a member of the Senate.

His students included Yang Du, Xia Shoutian, Liao Ping, Yang Rui, Liu Guangdi, Qi Baishi, Zhang Huang, Yang Zhuang, and Li Suixun.

== Works ==
- 湘绮楼诗文集 [Collection of Poems and Essays of Xiangqilou] (in Chinese). Changsha, Hunan: Yuelu Shushe. 2008. ISBN 9787806654064.
- 楚辞释 [Interpretation of Chu Ci] (in Chinese). Shanghai: Shanghai Classics Publishing House. 2019. ISBN 9787532593781.
- 桂阳直隶州志 [Prefecture Annals of Guiyang] (in Chinese). Changsha, Hunan: Yuelu Shushe. 2011. ISBN 9787807616375.
- 湘军志 [Records of Xiang Army] (in Chinese). Changsha, Hunan: Yuelu Shushe. 1983. ISBN 9787537136778.
- 论语训·春秋公羊传笺 [Commentary the Analects of Confucius/ Commentary the Spring and Autumn Annals Commentary by Gongyang Gao] (in Chinese). Changsha, Hunan: Yuelu Shushe. 2009. ISBN 9787807612223.
- 尔雅集解 [Commentary Literary Expositor] (in Chinese). Changsha, Hunan: Yuelu Shushe. 2010. ISBN 9787807614203.
- 王闿运手批唐诗选 [Wang Kaiyun's Comments on Tang Poetry] (in Chinese). Shanghai: Shanghai Classics Publishing House. 1989. ISBN 9787532504930.
- 光绪湘潭县志 [County Annals of Xiangtan] (in Chinese). Changsha, Hunan: Yuelu Shushe. 2010. ISBN 9787807613657.
