= Ho Yow =

Chinese diplomat

Ho Yow (Chinese: 何祐; Jyutping: ho4 jau6; pinyin: Hé Yòu) served as Chinese consulate general of San Francisco during a part of the San Francisco plague. His service as consulate general lasted from 1887 to 1902. Ho Yow was born in Hong Kong to a wealthy Guangzhou family. After a British education in his hometown, Ho completed his studies in Oxford and Long before returning to Hong Kong to practice law.

== Early years ==
Ho was born in Hong Kong to Reverend Ho Fuk-tong, an early Chinese missionary under the London Missionary Society. Sir Robert Kai Ho, a Legislative Councilor and community leader, is his brother.

He served as an articled clerk to his another brother Wyson Ho, the first Chinese solicitor in Hong Kong between 1887 and 1897.

Ho left Hong Kong to the United States in 1897 along with Ng Choy, his brother-in-law and the then-Chinese ambassador to the States.

== Chinese Consulate General ==
At the age of 28, Ho was appointed as vice consul of the San Francisco Chinese Consulate to general consul Chang Yin Tang in 1897. Ho was soon promoted to consulate general with the goal of increasing trade relations between the United States and China and serving the prosperity of Chinatown merchants. The arrival of this new consul general seemed to reenergize the Chinese community of San Francisco especially since his immediate superior, the Chinese minister in Washington, was his brother-in-law. Although a novice, San Francisco reacted favorably to Ho's appointment. He was charming, a "good" Chinese, fluent in English. Ho quickly achieved social prominence, not only in Chinatown but also in local political, business, and cultural circles. Despite his youth, Ho's mandarin persona impressed members of San Francisco's elite holding membership in the Bohemian Club. As a consul general, Ho Yow aimed to improve trade between the United States and China by opposing the Exclusion Act and recasting Chinatown's image. Notably in 1899, Ho organized a successful Chinese parade during San Francisco's Fourth of July Celebration. Ho published a series of essays advocating for the modernization of China, arguing that Chinese prosperity would increase Chinese demand for foreign goods, turning their economy into capitalist consumers for the United States to benefit from.

=== Recasting Chinatown's Image ===
When Ho Yow was appointed as the new vice consul in 1897, he also contributed to merchants' efforts to recast Chinatown's image during the 1900s. He helped Chinese merchants regain the allegiance of Chinatown's residents by fighting the secret society leaders and threatening them. This was all an effort to gain control of the tourism industry and change its negative view of Chinatown, which was influenced by white tour guides. Merchants also joined Consul Ho in complaining to city officials that professional guides had begun to establish fake opium dens and hire Chinese men and women to engage in "immoral exhibitions" for tourists. For good measure, Consul Ho issued his own list of regulations for Chinese tour guides, including the mandate that Chinese guides were not allowed to show "opium dens and whore houses" to tourists.

=== Tong Wars ===
The murder of Fung Jin Toy lead to a tong boycott of the See Yup Company goods, hindering the economy of Chinatown. Ho Yow actively worked to bring an agreement between the parties through his consulship authority, nearly succeeding.

=== San Francisco plague ===
On May 16, 1900, after confirmation of several Chinese deaths due to bubonic plague, Ho. along with leaders of the San Francisco Chinese community, recommended vaccinations to their associations and tongs. This recommendation was met with resistance, however Consul Ho and Six Companies tried to calm the concerns. Despite the effort, only 53 Chinese were vaccinated compared to the 530 Japanese and 234 of other races. "Clean-up" efforts moved to a second front in 1900, when health officials discovered the presence of bubonic plague in Chinatown and quarantined the quarter. Chinatown's merchants feared a devastating loss in income from tourists, and they joined Ho in publicly denying the existence of plague. The presumed emergence of plague was an embarrassment to residents. A traditional Chinese maxim counseled that shame should be covered up. Admission of the presence of plague was embarrassing to them, so they tried to hide any evidence of plague. Upon learning of attempts to hide bodies, many public figures derided the Chinese by calling them "heathens". Ho knew that he represented those that fled and hid from the interventions of the white doctors, however Ho denied that his people were actually sick. In an attempt to conciliate non-Chinese authorities, Ho advised Chinese who were sick to seek a "white physician", and if one could not afford that, an Oriental Dispensary doctor would be provided to them free of cost. Consul Ho and the Six Companies remained defiant; they had threatened to file a legal injunction to stop the quarantine before it was lifted. Later, an autopsy of a monkey confirming findings of plague diagnosis made federal officials, the Chinese leadership, and press representatives consider another quarantine. However, San Francisco's sanitarians were content just to follow up with their search and disinfection campaign instead of supporting another closure. Ho reluctantly agreed to support the planned sanitary campaign, offering the assistance of several hundred residents. He issued a proclamation to his countrymen explaining the need for the impending search because not only would it prevent plague but also avoid another disruptive quarantine.

=== The Exclusion Act ===
In the fall of 1901, Ho and Chinese minister Wu Tingfang shifted their attentions to the Exclusion Act, set to expire on May 5, 1902. Their thesis was that the current American legal approach toward Chinese immigration remained an obstacle to expanded and preferential trade, sustaining resentment and hostility between people of both nations. He explained that American labor and the unions opposed the entry of Chinese workers into the country because they profited from a scarcity of labor. Yet these foreign migrants contributed in their own way to the productivity and wealth on the Pacific Coast. In Ho's view, Congress had passed the exclusion laws to appease organized labor even though the Chinese were actually not real competitors; they were essentially menial labors. The consul declared the current lack of assimilation an asset rather than a deficiency: living in separate colonies, the Chinese were not interested in intruding into American domestic life.

=== Boxer Rebellion ===
The Boxer Rebellion in China prompted worries of an anti-Chinese backlash in San Francisco. Ho aimed to ease fears by stating his opinion that anti-Chinese sentiments by health officials did not increase. In a further attempt to reduce anti-Chinese sentiment, Ho, all the presidents of Chinatown associations and 200 Chinese merchants, provided an official statement denouncing the Boxers.

=== End of Consulship ===
Six Companies had filed grievances against Ho, and sent a list of complaints against Ho to the Chinese Imperial government. One of the complaints was the taking of bribes. Another concern was his lack of aggression during the debates on extending the Chinese Exclusion Act. The Chinese Exclusion Act was extended for 10 more years. Ho's title as consulate general was recalled by the Imperial government in 1902.

== Chinese-American Commercial Company ==
After his termination from the consul position, Ho became manager and vice president of the Chinese-American Commercial Company. The company was incorporated in California, backed by $1 million in gold by local and state bank presidents, and international, with several offices in Hong Kong, San Francisco, Chicago, and New York.
