= Little Pete =

Chinese American gangster

Little Pete (c. 1864 – January 23, 1897) was a prominent leader of the Som Yop Tong during the Tong wars of San Francisco's Chinatown in the 1890s.

Born Fung Jing Toy (Chinese: 馮正初; Jyutping: fung4 zing3 co1; pinyin: Féng Zhèngchū) in Kow Kong, Foshan city, Canton, China, around 1864, Little Pete emigrated to the United States with his family at the age of five in 1870. As a child he was said to have witnessed a battle between the Suey Sings and the Kwong Docks Tongs in 1875 and studied how the outcome of the battle could have been saved. Becoming involved in San Francisco's underworld by 1885, Little Pete had become a well known Tong hatchetman involved in prostitution, illegal gambling, and opium peddling. On one occasion, he was attacked by members of the rival Suey On Tong. Little Pete, wearing a steel-reinforced hat and chain mail, managed to fight the men armed with hatchets and clubs, driving them off and soon throughout Chinatown he was considered invincible. By 1890, at the age of twenty-five, Little Pete was the leader of the Som Yop Tong and quickly became involved in a gang war with rival Sue Yop Tong during which Little Pete was said to have killed over fifty Tong members.

During this time the local press first began to take notice of him and dubbing him "Little Pete". Little Pete regularly began to walk around Chinatown in his chain mail armor, accompanied by three bodyguards, as his regular payoffs to city officials, particularly Christopher Augustine Buckley, convinced rivals of Little Pete's influence in San Francisco. This fear of Little Pete using his influence to eliminate his rivals may have been the cause of hired Tong assassins Lem Jung and Chew Tin Gop who attacked Little Pete in a barbershop with one of the assassins grabbing him by the hair and shooting him five times in the spine under his chainmail on January 23, 1897. Lem Jung and Chew Tin Gop later returned to China as wealthy men as a result of Little Pete's murder.
