= Jack Manion =

American police officer

Inspector John J. Manion (1877–March 1959), San Francisco Police Department, was a veteran officer assigned by Chief Dan O'Brien in 1921 to head up the notorious 16-member Chinatown Squad which had been established in 1875.

In the 1920s, San Francisco's Chinatown covered eight city blocks between Bush and Broadway, and three blocks up Nob Hill from Kearny Street to Powell Street. Grant and Stockton streets were the main north-south thoroughfares. As early as the 1850s, Chinese immigrants began organizing into protective associations based on family, business, or their home districts. Shunned and fiercely discriminated against on race as well as economics by the wider community, the people in Chinatown, a segregated population, banded together in associations, companies or the label applied by the press, tongs.

Five of the district associations formed the Chinese Consolidated Benevolent Association in the late 1850s, known as the Five companies by non-Chinese in California. In 1862, a sixth association was added and the grouping became known to outsiders as the Chinese Six Companies.

Manion was set to the task of controlling the tongs that controlled illicit gambling, lotteries, narcotics, prostitution and other criminal enterprises with hired gunmen and the so-called "hatchetmen."
