= Xia Suntong =

Chinese scholar

Xia Suntong (Chinese: 夏孙桐; pinyin: Xià Sūntóng; 1857–1941) was a Chinese scholar who co-authored the Draft History of Qing. A native of Jiangyin, Jiangsu, Xia became a jinshi in 1892 and was admitted into the Hanlin Academy. He was also a prolific painter and poet.
