= Bing Kong Tong =

Chinese-American fraternal organization

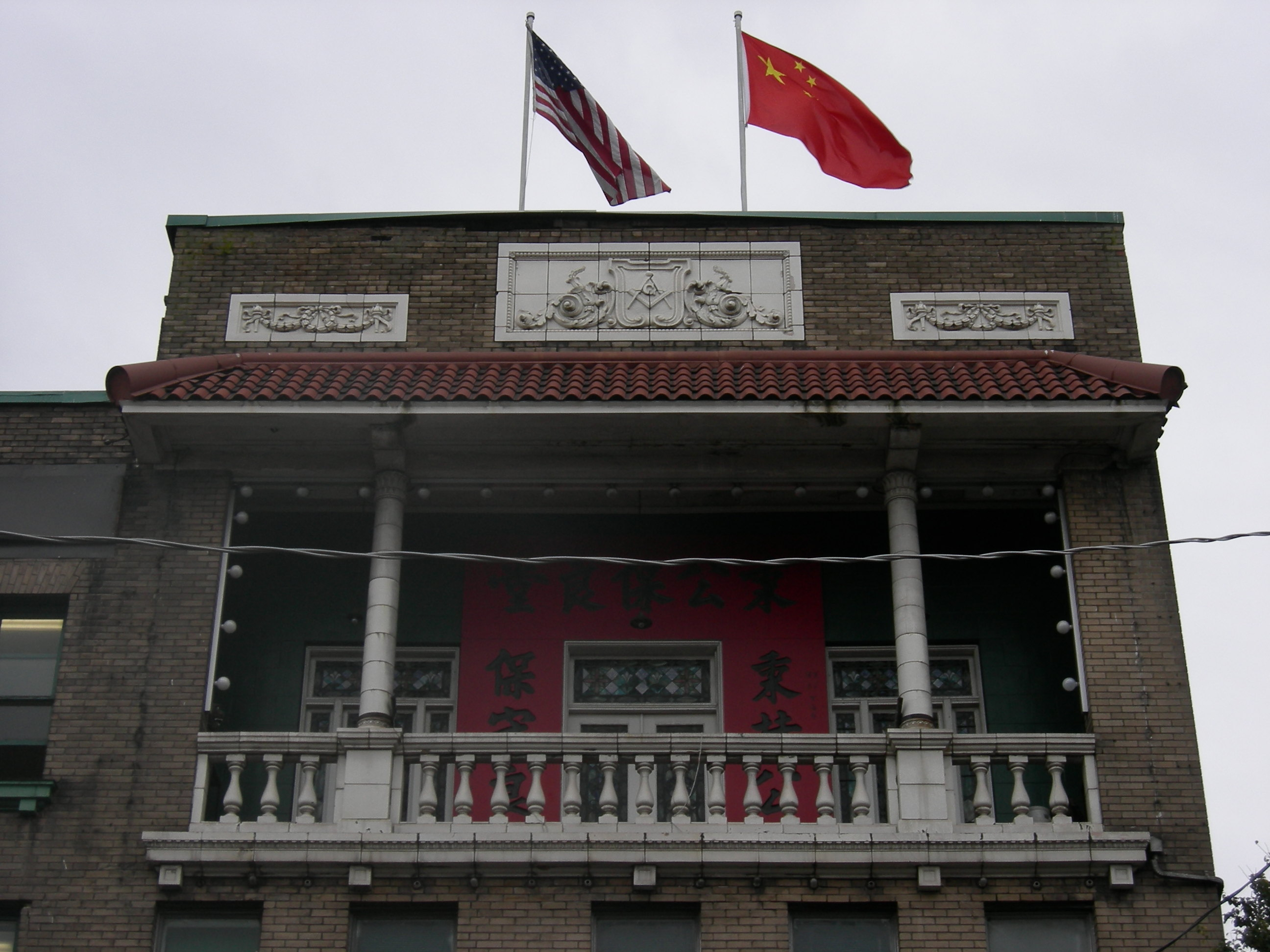
Bing Kung Association building in Seattle Chinatown

The Bing Kong Tong (Chinese: 秉公堂; Jyutping: bing2 gung1 tong4; pinyin: Bǐnggōng Táng) was one of the most powerful Tongs in San Francisco's Chinatown during the early 20th century. Since most immigrants from China to the United States during the 19th century were from the province of Guangdong, Chinatowns founded at that time used place names which were transliterated from Cantonese. The literal translation of 堂; tong4 is "hall", while 秉公; bing2 gung1 translates to "with justice."

== History ==
Also known as the Bing Kong Tong Society (or Bing Kung Association in Seattle, Washington), the organization was one of the largest in California when the Hop Sing and Suey Sing Tongs allied against the Bing Kong Tong, instigating one of the most violent Tong wars in the United States. As the gang war continued, the numerous murders caught the attention of the press as the often gruesome slayings were detailed. Eventually an investigation headed by Santa Rosa, California, attorney Wallace L. Ware, in cooperation with the district attorney's office, exposed the extent of the Bing Kongs' influence throughout the Chinese American populations along the west coast and southwestern United States (as far as the conviction of four members for a Tong murder in Kingman, Arizona).

Weakened by the decade long war against the rival Tongs as well as state authorities, the Bing Kongs would eventually emerge as a trade union, although it is suspected by federal and local law enforcement officials to still have remaining ties to organized crime.
