= Hui (secret society) =

Term for a secret society

Hui (Chinese: 會) is a Chinese word, generally meaning 'conference', but which is sometimes used to refer to a secret society. It is often mutually interchangeable with terms like kongsi (Chinese: 公司; pinyin: Gōngsī), a term generally used to mean 'corporation' or 'company'. For overseas Chinese, kongsi can also denote a Chinese clan or a Chinese district association (Chinese: 會館; pinyin: Huìgǔan). The Hokkien-derived term kongsi (公司, Pe̍h-ōe-jī: kong-si) is more widely known in Southeast Asia, however, whereas in China, the secret societies were just simply known as hui.

In modern Hawaii vernacular, hui is used to refer to any group or organization. Similarly, in Māori, the word hui retains its traditional meaning as a gathering.

== See also ==
- Tiandihui
- Triad society
- Tong (organization)
- Chinese migration
- Chinese Clan Association
- Tongmenghui, precursor to the Kuomintang (Chinese Nationalist Party)
- Hui (Māori assembly)
