= Hop Sing Tong =

Chinese-American fraternal and criminal organization

- Formation: 1875

Chinese name
- Traditional Chinese: 合勝堂
- Simplified Chinese: 合胜堂
Transcriptions
Standard Mandarin
- Hanyu Pinyin: Hé Shèng Táng
Yue: Cantonese
- Jyutping: Hap6 Sing3 Tong4

The Hop Sing Tong is a Chinese American Tong.

The Hop Sing Tong's official records place its establishment in 1875 in San Francisco, though the tong may have been active as early as the 1860s. Newspaper reports on the Hop Sing Tong first appeared in the mid-1870s, placing the group and its activities in Virginia City, Nevada, where many Chinese immigrants lived as silver miners, only noting a presence in California since 1881. Additional branches were established throughout the northwestern United States by the end of the decade.

Historically, the Hop Sing Tong was noted for its particular use of violence in conflicts with other tongs, particularly during the Tong Wars, and its fine calligraphy used on official documents and building inscriptions. Examples of the latter include the front entrance signage of the San Francisco and Seattle branches, by Zhu Ruzhen and Xia Tonghe respectively. Until the end of the Qing dynasty, the tong kept close ties to imperial authorities.

== Branches ==
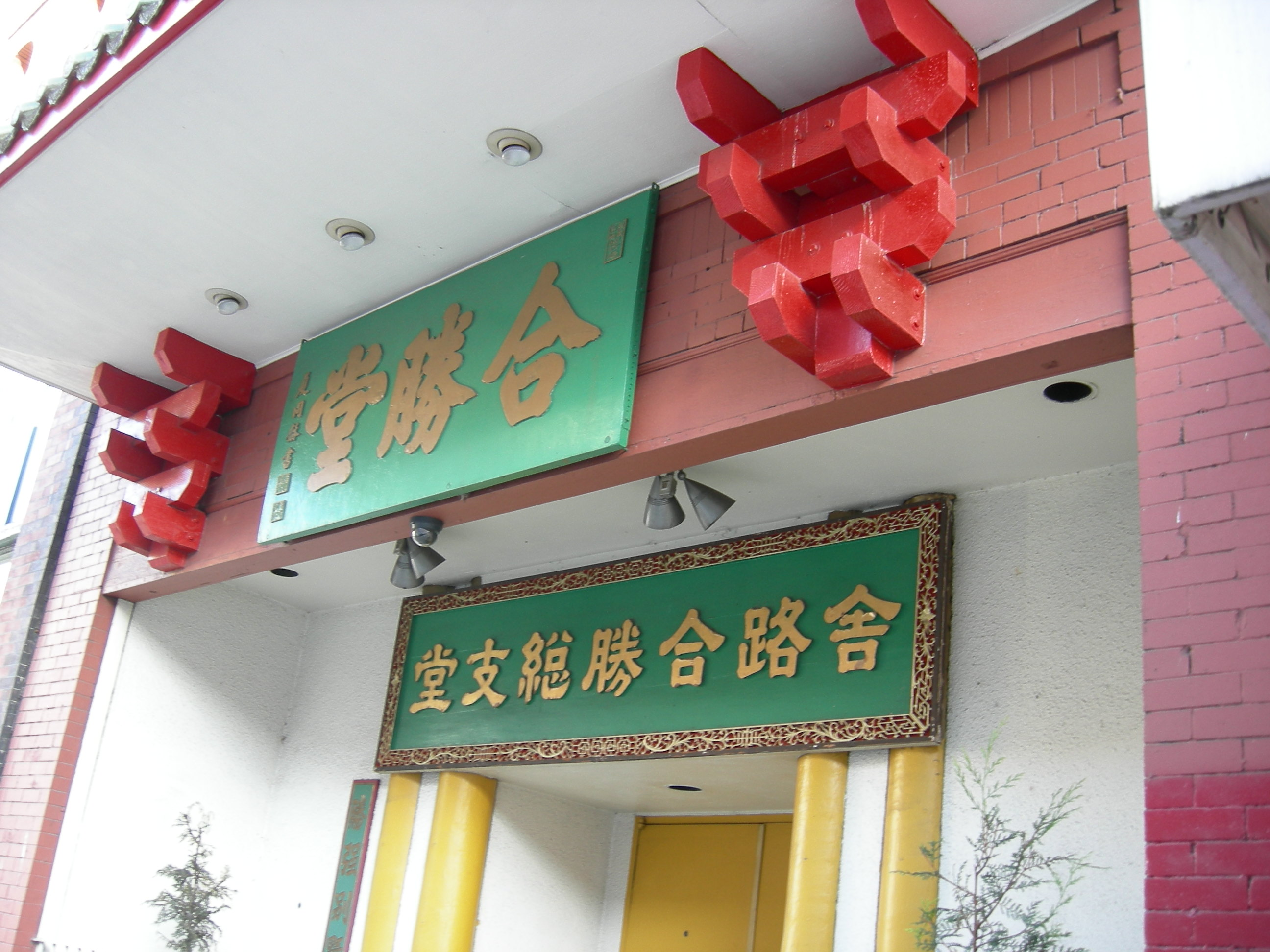
The Hop Sing Tong building signage in Seattle, Washington.

The Hop Sing Tong has several branches in the United States. Branches include:

- Boise, Idaho - 706 Front Street (defunct)
- Denver, Colorado - 4130 E Colfax Avenue
- Los Angeles, California - 428 Gin Ling Way
- Marysville, California - 113 C Street
- Portland, Oregon - 317 NW 4th Avenue
- Reno - 260 Lake Street (defunct)
- San Francisco, California - 137 Waverly Place
- San Jose, California - 639 N 6th Street (defunct)
- Santa Barbara - 100 East Canon Perdido Street (defunct)
- Seattle, Washington - 512 Maynard Avenue S
- Vallejo, California - 404 Marin Street (defunct)

Historic locations for which no present addresses are known also include Calexico, Monterey, and potentially Folsom.
