= Xia Shoutian =

Chinese artist and politician

Xia Shoutian (Chinese: 夏壽田; 1870 – 1935) was a Chinese artist and politician active in both the Qing dynasty and the Republic of China.
