= Xia Tonghe =

Chinese scholar and calligrapher

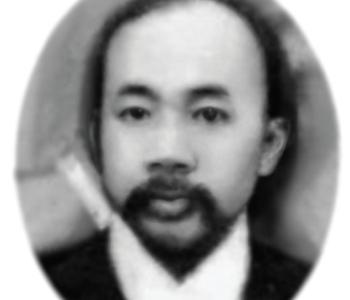
Xia Tonghe.

Xia Tonghe (Chinese: 夏同龢; 1868–1925) was a Chinese scholar and calligrapher active in the Qing dynasty. He was a member of the secret society Hop Sing Tong.
