= Tong (organization) =

Chinese immigrant secret societies in Western cities

- Territory: United States, United Kingdom, Canada, Australia, New Zealand and other similar organizations in Southeast Asian countries
- Ethnicity: Han Chinese, Chinese Americans and other Overseas Chinese diaspora
- Activities: Illegal: gambling, corruption, white-collar crime, money laundering. Legal: Lobbying, construction, hospitality industry
- Allies: Triads

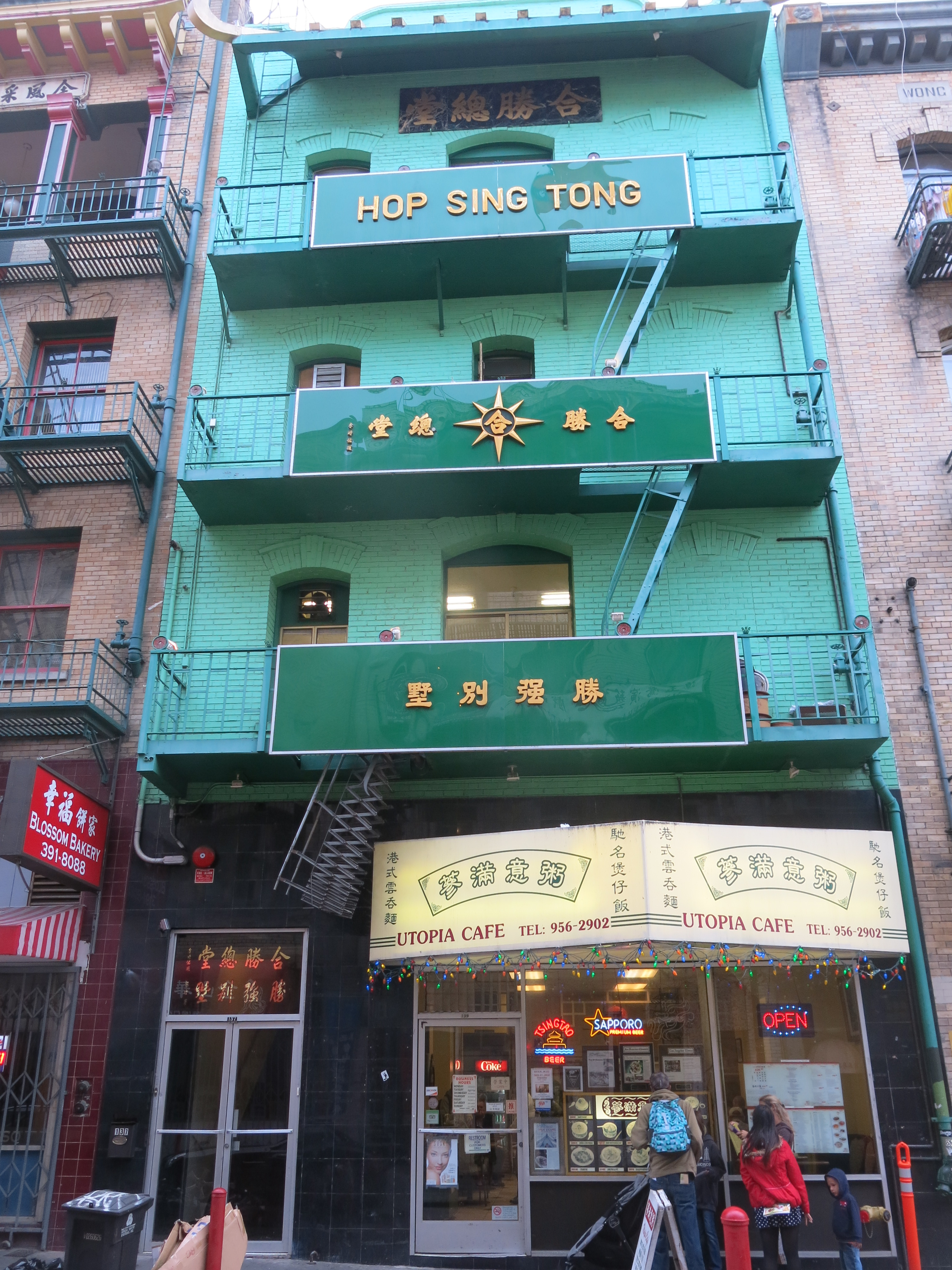
Hop Sing Tong Building, San Francisco Chinatown

A tong (Chinese: 堂; pinyin: táng; Jyutping: tong4; Cantonese Yale: tòhng; lit. 'hall') is a type of organization found among Chinese immigrants predominantly living in the United States, with smaller numbers in Canada, Australia, New Zealand, and the United Kingdom. In Chinese, the word tong means 'hall' or 'gathering place'. These organizations are described as secret societies or sworn brotherhoods and are often tied to criminal activity. In the 1990s, in most American Chinatowns, clearly marked tong halls could easily be found, many of which have had affiliations with Chinese organized crime.

These associations often provide services for Chinatown communities such as immigrant counseling, Chinese schools, and English classes for adults. Tongs follow the pattern of secret societies common to southern China and many are connected to a secret society called the Tiandihui, which follows this pattern. Other groups worldwide that follow this pattern and are connected with the Tiandihui are known as hui, Hongmen, and triads.

== History ==
Tongs first appeared in China in 1644 when the Ming dynasty was overthrown by the Qing dynasty. One of the first tongs was established by the secret society Chee Kung Tong, which aimed to restore the power of the Ming dynasty by removing the new Manchu rulers of the Qing dynasty. These Zhigongtang tongs were located in the province of Guangdong, which was home to many of the first Chinese migrants heading to the United States—some of whom would take with them the notion of a tong as an organization to set up there.

=== Establishment of tongs in various Asian countries ===
After the 17th century, large numbers of Chinese, particularly from the Fujian and Canton areas, migrated to seek their fortunes in Southeast Asia and Taiwan. These Chinese immigrants quickly formed a trader and merchant class in many societies in various Asian countries such as the Philippines, Indonesia, and Malaysia.

=== Tongs in English-speaking countries ===
Before the 1840s, very few Chinese had emigrated to the United States, Canada, Australia, or New Zealand. However, by the mid-19th-century, Chinese immigrant numbers dramatically increased. Beginning with a few hundred immigrants, their numbers increased to an estimated hundreds of thousands of Chinese immigrants.

Former Taiping Heavenly Kingdom military commander Yang Fuqing is alleged to have fled to the United States following the rebel state's defeat and started a secret society in Los Angeles.

== Tongs in the United States ==
After settling in San Francisco and other California cities, Chinese workers were willing to work for lower wages than their American counterparts. Labor unions and American workers discouraged undercutting wages, so many Chinese left and went east. As a result, many Chinese immigrants moved to cities such as New York, Philadelphia, and Boston. Today these cities still have ethnic Chinese communities large enough to have developed Chinatowns. They have also been joined by new immigrants of the late 20th and early 21st centuries.

Many Chinese soon organized voluntary benevolent associations for support and protection. These are usually formed by people originating in their district in China, family name, or depending on what native dialect, for example in the case of Hakka speakers, or sworn brotherhoods. The tongs provided services for immigrants such as employment and housing opportunities. They also helped resolve individual and group disputes within the community. Many of these volunteer societies did not have the financial ability to fund community events or look after their members, and those that did tended to focus inward and provide help only to their own members. As a result, many tongs with little or no hereditary financial value had to either disband or operate criminal activities such as gambling houses and prostitution. This transformed them from benevolent associations to providers of illegal services. The term tong became unfavorably associated with the secret brotherhoods in Chinatowns, and they often battled with other associations in that area. Tongs were usually composed of young men, some with criminal backgrounds, or outcasts who had been expelled from their associations. Notably, many of the traditional tong activities, such as gambling, were legal in China, but not in North America.

Early Chinese populations in the United States and Canada were overwhelmingly male, especially after sex-restrictive immigration laws were passed in 1875 in the U.S. and 1923 in Canada, respectively (see Page Act of 1875 and Chinese Immigration Act, 1923). For this reason tongs participated heavily in importing women from China for both marriage and prostitution. Many of these women did not come to America by choice, and some were deceived and forced into prostitution by procurers. Tongs associated with importing women to America fought over territories and profits. This became known as the "Tong Wars", which were a series of violent attacks between two branches of the Tong Gang, the Hip Sing Tong and On Leong Tong. The reasons for this conflict vary, from struggles over territory to assassinations of members. The "Tong Wars" of the 19th and early 20th centuries were often based on control of these women. In the early years the tongs employed "hatchet men" or boo how doy (Chinese: 斧頭仔), also called highbinders, as hired killers to fight the street battles that ensued over turf, business and women.

=== San Francisco, California ===
San Francisco was the home of the first Tong in the United States; it formed in reaction to the hostility that Chinese immigrants faced from American workers upon their arrival to America. In Bill Lee's memoirs in "The Chinese Playground", which recalls the activities of the Tong Gang in San Francisco, he states that the oppression Chinese immigrants faced led them to turn to the Tong for protection. While it is true that the Tong offered protection, it is unclear if this protection was forced as a means to gain control of territory for the distribution of the group's illicit activities. During the plague outbreak in Chinatown of San Francisco in the 1900s, the Chinese Six Companies recommended the vaccination plan to their members and the tongs. Doubting the effectiveness of vaccinations, many Chinese residents of Chinatown refused inoculations. Several tongs went so far as to threaten harm to those who did get vaccinated, as well as the Chinese leadership that endorsed doing so.

== Structure and aims ==
Tongs in North America showed many similarities to the triads of Hong Kong and British colonies in Southeast Asia. These included similar initiation ceremonies and paying respect to the same deities. This is because both are similar organizations that follow the patterns of southern Chinese secret societies and sworn brotherhoods. The triad societies were underground organizations in British colonies that also existed for self-help of members, but spoke of the overthrow of the Qing dynasty. Ko-lin Chin outlined that most tongs have similar organization and have a headquarters where one can find a president, a vice president, a secretary, a treasurer, an auditor, and several elders and public relations administrators. Today their main aims are to care for their members and their respective communities.

== Notable Chinese tongs ==
- Bing Kong Tong, California, Washington
- Hip Sing Tong, New York and branches in 13 other states
- On Leong Tong, New York
- Suey Sing Tong, California, Oregon, Washington, U.S. and British Columbia, Canada
- Hop Sing Tong, California, Oregon, Washington, Idaho, Colorado.

== See also ==
- Hui
- Secret society
- Tong Wars
- Triad (organized crime)
- Tiandihui
- List of Chinese criminal organizations
- List of criminal enterprises, gangs, and syndicates

== Bibliography ==
- Chin, Ko-lin. Chinatown Gangs: Extortion, Enterprise, and Ethnicity. Oxford University Press, 2000
- Chin, Ko-lin. "Chinatowns and Tongs". In Chinese Subculture and Criminality: Non-Traditional Crime Groups in America. New York: Greenwood Press, 1990, pp. 47–66
- Dillon, Richard H. The Hatchet Men: The Story of the Tong Wars in San Francisco's Chinatown. New York: Coward-McCann, 1962, p. 18
- Ebrey, Patricia Buckley. The Cambridge Illustrated History of China. New York: Cambridge University Press, 1999
- "Tong War (United States history)" - Britannica Online Encyclopedia. http://www.britannica.com/EBchecked/topic/599143/tong-war (accessed February 12, 2011)
- Huston, Peter. Tongs, Gangs, and Triads: Chinese Crime Groups in North America. Boulder, Colorado: Paladin Press, 1995
- Chan, Sucheng; Hsu, Madeline Y. Chinese Americans and the Politics of Race and Culture. Temple University Press, 2008
- Asian Organized Crime Groups - Chinese - Tongs and Street Gangs
- SF Weekly Feature Article Profiling Member of Hop Sing Tong -- Raymond "Shrimp Boy" Chow (2007)
- Tongs Encyclopedia of Chicago
