= Suey Sing Association =

Chinese-American fraternal organization

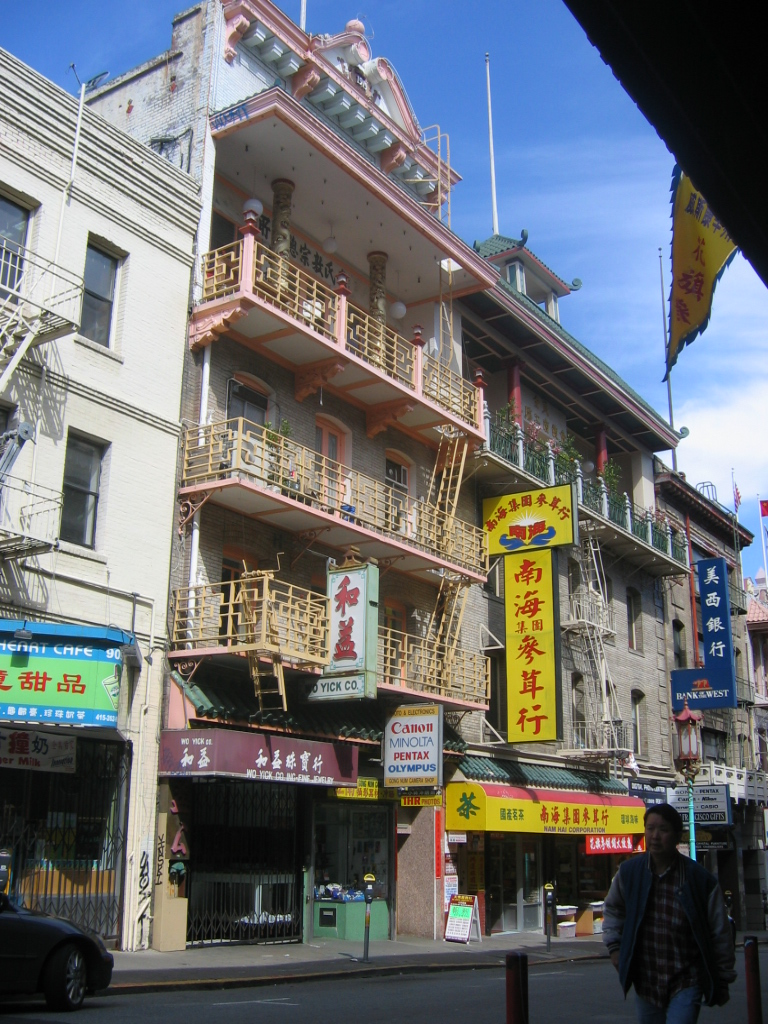
Suey Sing building in Chinatown, San Francisco (919–925 Grant Avenue), between the prominent yellow sign and the Bank of the West sign

The Suey Sing Association (Chinese: 萃勝工商會; Jyutping: seoi6 sing3 gung1 soeng1 wui2) is a historical Chinese American association that was established in 1867. Formerly known as the Suey Sing Tong (Chinese: 萃勝堂; Jyutping: seoi6 sing3 tong4), this was changed to its current name in 1920. In early 1994, the Suey Sing Association became the first organization in the Chinese community to fly the flag of the People's Republic of China. Currently there are more than 1000 members.

== Branches ==
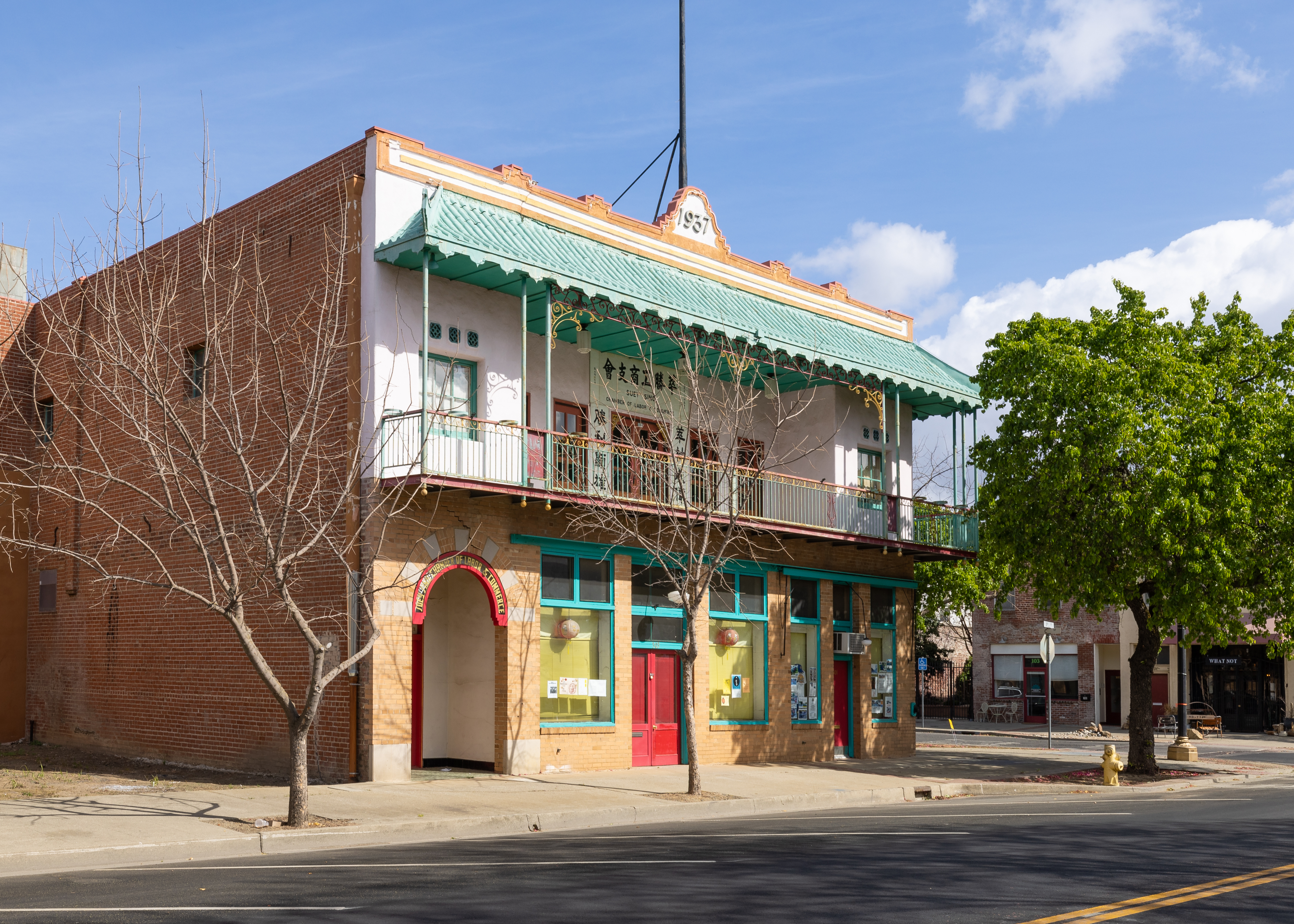
Suey Sing building in Marysville’s historic Chinatown

The Suey Sing Association has several branches in the United States and Canada including in:

- Los Angeles, California - 755 Yale Street
- Marysville, California - 305 1st Street (defunct since 2011; relocated to Sacramento)
- Oakland, California - 331 8th Street
- Portland, Oregon - 8743 SE Powell Blvd
- Sacramento, California - 1716 Broadway
- Salinas, California - 25 Soledad Street
- San Francisco, California - 925 Grant Avenue
- Seattle, Washington - 815 S Weller Street Suite 112
- Stockton, California - 345 S San Joaquin Street
- Watsonville, California - 118 Bridge Street (defunct)
- Richmond, British Columbia - 11180 # 210 Bridgeport Rd
