= Chin (surname) =

- Pronunciation: /tʃɪn/
- Language: Chinese, Korean, English

Other names
- Variant forms: Chinese: Chen, Jin, Qian, Qin; Korean: Jin; English: Chinn

Chin is a surname. As a Chinese surname or Korean surname, it could originate from various Chinese characters (including 陳, 錢, and 秦), and it is also a surname in other cultures as well.

== Origins ==
As a Chinese surname, Chin could originate from numerous Chinese characters including the following, listed by their spelling in Mandarin Pinyin:

- Chen (traditional Chinese: 陳; simplified Chinese: 陈), spelled Chin based on its pronunciation in multiple varieties of Chinese including Hakka (Hagfa Pinyim: Cin^{2}; IPA: /t͡sʰɨn¹¹/). This spelling of the surname is particularly common in Jamaica, to the extent that other Jamaicans will often use the nickname "Miss Chin" to address any Chinese Jamaican woman whose name they do not know.
- Jīn (Chinese: 金; IPA: /t͡ɕin⁵⁵/), spelled Chin in the Wade–Giles system used until the mid-20th century and still widespread in Taiwan.
- Jìn (Chinese: 靳; IPA: /t͡ɕin⁵¹/), spelled Chin in the Wade–Giles system.
- Qián (traditional Chinese: 錢; simplified Chinese: 钱), spelled Chin based on its pronunciation in Cantonese (Jyutping: Cin4; Cantonese Yale: Chìhn; IPA: /t͡sʰiːn²¹/). Written with a character meaning "money", according to tradition this originated as an occupational surname during the Western Zhou dynasty.
- Qín (Chinese: 秦; IPA: /t͡ɕʰin³⁵/), spelled Chin based on a simplification of the Wade–Giles spelling Ch'in. This originated as a toponymic surname, referring either to the state of Qin or to later places with the same name.

As a Korean surname, Chin is the McCune–Reischauer romanisation of the four surnames more commonly spelled Jin in the Revised Romanization of Korean (Korean: 진; Hanja: 陳, 秦, 眞, or 晉; IPA: /t͡ɕin/). There is no modern Korean surname which Revised Romanization would spell as Chin (친).

As an English surname, Chin is a variant spelling of Chinn (from Middle English chinne or chyn), which originated as a nickname for people with prominent or distinctive chins.

== Statistics ==
The 2000 South Korean census found 170,980 people with the four Korean surnames spelled Chin in McCune–Reischauer. However, relatively few South Koreans with these surnames choose to spell them as Chin. In a study based on year 2007 application data for South Korean passports, 94.3% of the applicants with one of these surnames chose the spelling Jin for their passport, while only 4.7% chose the spelling Chin.

According to statistics cited by Patrick Hanks, 1,504 people on the island of Great Britain and 17 on the island of Ireland bore the surname Chin in 2011. In 1881 there were 53 people with the surname in Great Britain, primarily at Cornwall.

The 2010 United States census found 27,487 people with the surname Chin, making it the 1,279th-most-common name overall. This represented an increase in absolute numbers, but a decrease in relative frequency, from 25,673 (1,255th-most-common) in the 2000 Census. In both censuses, slightly more than three quarters of the bearers of the surname identified as Asian, about 6% as White, and about 6% as Black. It was the 50th-most-common surname among respondents to the 2000 Census who identified as Asian.

== People ==
=== Government, law, and politics ===
- Larry Chin (金無怠; 1922–1986), Chinese-born American CIA officer
- Chin Harn Tong (钱翰琮; born 1938), Singaporean politician
- Peter Chin (陳荣和; born 1941), New Zealand politician
- Ming Chin (陳惠明; born 1942), American judge
- Peter Chin Fah Kui (陈华贵; born 1945), Malaysian politician
- Elias Camsek Chin (born 1949), Palauan politician
- Chin Young (진영; 陳永; born 1950), South Korean politician
- Chin Hsiao-hui (金筱輝; born 1951), Taiwanese politician
- Chin Tet Yung (陈德镛; born 1951), Singaporean politician
- Denny Chin (陳卓光; born 1954), American federal judge
- Margaret Chin (陳倩雯; born 1954), American politician of Chinese descent
- Maria Chin Abdullah (born Chin Cheen Lian 陳清蓮, 1956), Malaysian politician
- Ben Chin (진병규; born 1964), Canadian political advisor
- Chin Wan (陳雲; born 1964), Hong Kong localist activist
- Doug Chin (born 1966), American lawyer and politician from Hawaii
- Chin Bun Sean, Cambodian politician
- Gabriel J. Chin, American law professor
- Chin Liew Ten, Singaporean philosophy professor

=== Music ===
- Eddie Chin (born 1948), American bassist
- Vincent "Randy" Chin (1937–2003), Jamaican record producer
- Leonard Chin (born 1953), Jamaican reggae record producer
- Clive Chin (born 1954), Jamaican record producer
- Gordon Shi-Wen Chin (金希文; born 1957), Taiwanese composer
- Unsuk Chin (진은숙; 陳銀淑; born 1961), South Korean composer of classical music
- Tessanne Chin (born 1985), Jamaican recording artist
- Esther Applunius Chin (born 1987), Malaysian singer
- Robotaki (born Preston Anthony Chin, 1991), Canadian DJ and producer
- Meg Lee Chin, American musician
- Valentine Chin, Jamaican guitarist

=== Science and engineering ===
- Chin Fung Kee (1920–1990), Malaysian civil engineer
- Roland Chin (錢大康; born 1952), Hong Kong electrical engineering professor
- Wynne Chin (born c. 1960), American management information systems professor
- Lynda Chin (born 1968), Chinese-born American medical doctor
- Karen Chin (fl. 1996–present), American paleontologist and taphonomist
- James Chin, American public health epidemiologist

=== Sport ===
- Chin Kuai-Ti (靳貴第; 1915–?), Chinese boxer
- George Chin (born 1929), Canadian ice hockey player
- Honson Chin (born 1956), Jamaican cyclist
- Aurora Chin (born 1958), Romanian archer
- Colin Chin (born 1961), American ice hockey player
- Carla Chin (born 1966), Canadian football goalkeeper
- Tiffany Chin (born 1967), American figure skating coach
- Jimmy Chin (born 1973), American mountaineer
- Krissy Chin (born 1980), American figure competitor
- Chin Eei Hui (陈仪慧; born 1982), Malaysian badminton player
- Gordon Chin (陳珩琛; born 1983), Canadian soccer midfielder
- Chin Chum (born 1985), Cambodian football striker
- Chin Kah Mun (陳嘉雯; born 1985), Malaysian badminton player
- Dennis Chin (born 1987), Jamaican football forward
- Marc Chin (born 1987), Caymanian cricketer
- Shawn Chin (born 1989), American soccer midfielder and forward
- Andrew Chin (born 1992), American baseball pitcher
- Casey Chin (born 1992), Canadian football linebacker
- Lee Chin (born 1992), Irish hurler, Gaelic football, and soccer player
- Alex Chin (錢兆琛; born 2000), Hong Kong footballer
- Christian Didier Chin (born 2000), Malaysian tennis player

=== Television and film ===
- Chin Tsi-ang (錢似鶯; 1909–2007), Chinese martial artist and actress
- Chin Han (actor, born 1938) (金漢), Hong Kong actor
- Chin Han (actor, born 1946) (秦漢), Taiwanese actor
- Charlie Chin (秦祥林; born 1948), Taiwanese actor
- Glen Chin (1948–2018), American actor of Chinese descent
- Chin Shih-chieh (金士傑; born 1951), Taiwanese actor
- Marcus Chin (陈建彬; born 1954), Singaporean actor
- Chin Siu-ho (錢小豪; born 1963), Hong Kong actor
- Chin Ka-lok (錢嘉樂; born 1965), Hong Kong actor
- Sheila Chin (陳淑蘭; born 1969), Hong Kong actress
- Feodor Chin (born 1974), American actor
- Cheryl Chin (born 1979), Singaporean actress
- Jolene Chin (陳影雯; born 1980), Malaysian actress
- Ashley Chin (born 1982), English actor of Jamaican descent
- Felicia Chin (陈凤玲; born 1984), Singaporean actress
- Jasmine Suraya Chin (born 1989), Malaysian television presenter and actress
- Lee Lin Chin, Indonesian-born Australian radio and television presenter

=== Writers and humanities scholars ===
- Chin Shunshin (陳舜臣; 1924–2015), Japanese novelist from Taiwan
- Frank Chin (born 1940), American writer
- Annping Chin (金安平; born 1950), American history lecturer
- Marilyn Chin (陳美玲; born 1955), Hong Kong-born American writer
- Chin Jung-kwon (진중권; 陳重權; born 1963), South Korean aesthetician
- Justin Chin (1969–2015), Malaysian-born American poet
- Staceyann Chin (born 1972), Jamaican poet
- Mei Chin (born 1977), American writer
- Jason Chin (born c. 1978), American children's writer
- Abby Chin (born 1982), American sports journalist

=== Other ===
- Chin Gee Hee (陳宜禧; 1844–1929), Chinese merchant in Guangdong and Seattle, Washington
- Chin Chun Hock (陳程學; 1844–1927), first Chinese man to settle in Seattle, Washington
- Anna-Marie Chin, New Zealand architect
- Arthur Chin (陳瑞鈿; 1913–1997), American World War II fighter pilot in China
- Chin Iee-chong (진의종; 陳懿鍾; 1921-1995), South Korean politician and Prime Minister of South Korea (1983-1985)
- Chin Peng (陳平; 1924–2013), Malaysian communist leader
- Leeann Chin (restaurateur) (1933–2010), Guangzhou-born American restaurateur
- Mel Chin (born 1951), American visual artist
- Chin Dae-je (진대제; 陳大濟; born 1952), South Korean businessman and politician
- Vincent Jen Chin (陳果仁; 1955–1982), American murder victim
- Curtis S. Chin (born 1965), American businessman
- Alan Chin (artist) (born 1987), American artist of Chinese descent
- Alan Chin (photographer), American photographer
- Francis Y. L. Chin, Hong Kong computer science professor
- Walter Chin, Jamaican photographer

=== Fictional characters ===
- The Crimson Chin, from American animated television series The Fairly OddParents
- Jordi Chin, from Ubisoft's video games series Watch Dogs

== See also ==
- Chinn, surname
- Chin Kung (born 1927), Chinese Buddhist monk (Chin Kung is his dharma name)
- Eusoff Chin (full name Mohamed Eusoff bin Chin, born 1936), Malaysian lawyer (Chin is a patronymic)
- Chin Sian Thang (1938–2021), chairman of the Zomi Congress for Democracy in Myanmar (Burmese names do not have surnames)
- Botak Chin (1951–1981), Malaysian gangster (botak is an epithet meaning 'bald', and Chin is part of his given name)
