= Madeline Y. Hsu =

American historian of Chinese American and Asian American history

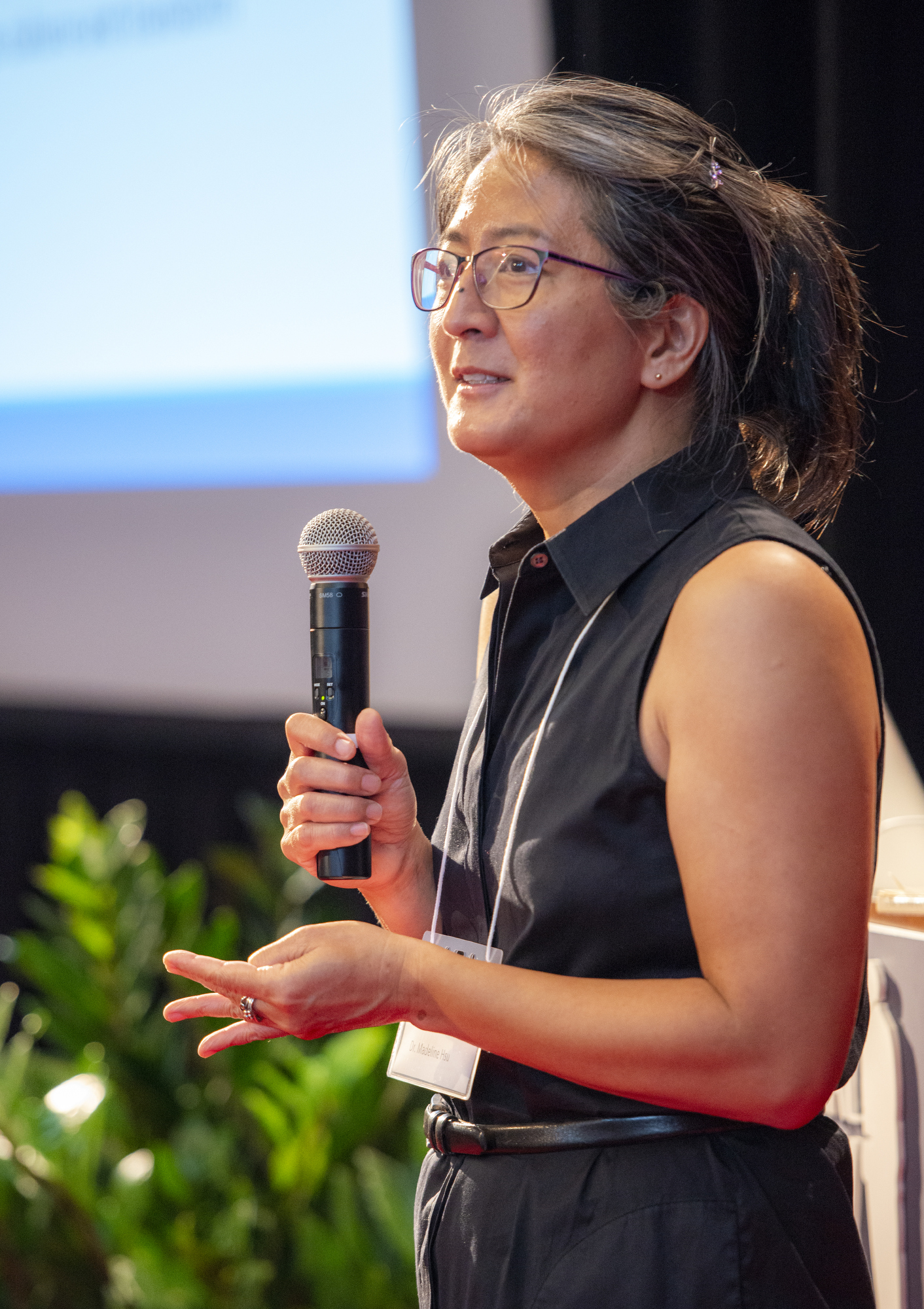
- Born: 3 October 1967 (age 59); Columbia, Missouri

Academic background
- Education: Pomona College; Yale University

Academic work
- Discipline: History, migration studies
- Sub-discipline: Chinese Overseas History; Asian American History; US Immigration History
- Institutions: San Francisco State University; University of Texas at Austin

Madeline Y. Hsu (Chinese: 徐元音; born 3 October 1967) is a historian known for her scholarship in Asian American, US immigration, and migration history. She is the director of the Center for Global Migration Studies at the University of Maryland and is an elected Fellow of the Society of American Historians. She is the eldest granddaughter of the neo-Confucian scholar Xu Fuguan.

== Early life and education ==
Born in Columbia, Missouri, Hsu spent her childhood between her maternal grandparents' home in Arkansas and where her father found employment in Taiwan and Hong Kong. She completed a BA (1989) in history at Pomona College, followed by a MA (1993) and PhD (1996) in history from Yale University. During her graduate studies, she studied modern Chinese history with Jonathan Spence and Betsy Bartlett, and US immigration history from David Montgomery.

== Career ==
Hsu taught at San Francisco State University from 1996 to 2006, before taking a post at the University of Texas at Austin in 2006, where she served as Director of the Center for Asian American Studies (2006–2014) and was Mary Helen Thompson Centennial Professor in the Humanities and Professor of History and Asian American Studies.

In 2021, Hsu was elected a Fellow of the Society of American Historians. She has also served as President (2018–2021) of the Immigration and Ethnic History Society. In 2023, she joined the University of Maryland to direct the Center for Global Migration Studies.

=== Research and writing ===
Hsu's work in Chinese American and Asian American history has been well received, with her first two books, Dreaming of Gold, Dreaming of Home (2000) and The Good Immigrants (2015), given the History Book Award by the Association for Asian American Studies in 2002 and 2017, respectively.

Dreaming of Gold, Dreaming of Home, based on her PhD dissertation, studies the lives of Chinese men working in the US during the era of Chinese Exclusion, and their transnational connections with their home villages. While Chinese laborers were racially targeted as unwelcome immigrants up until the 1940s and 1950s, her second book, The Good Immigrants, focuses on the recruitment of Chinese students who were seen as benefiting both China and the extension of U.S. influence abroad. During World War II, their high levels of education and attainments made them attractive as “good” immigrants. This shift to “brain drain” policies became permanent with the Immigration and Nationality Act of 1965 which consolidated the transformation of many Asians, and especially Chinese, from “yellow peril” to "model minorities".

The Good Immigrants received several other honors including the 2016 Robert H. Ferrell Book Prize; the 2015 Theodore J. Saloutos Book Award; the 2015 Chinese American Librarians Association Award for non-fiction; and named as a 2014–2015 Asian Pacific American Librarians Association Adult Non-Fiction Honor Book.

Hsu is the lead scholar for “Teach Immigration History," a curriculum project cosponsored by IEHS, the NEH, and UT Austin for high school teachers of U.S. history and civics, as well as for general audiences. The website provides an 80-item chronology of key events, laws, and court rulings that are further explained by a dozen thematic lesson plans on topics such as citizenship, an overview of major laws, gender and immigration, and migration within the Americas.

== Selected publications ==
- Hsu, Madeline Y. (2000). Dreaming of Gold, Dreaming of Home: Transnationalism and Migration Between the United States and South China, 1882-1943. Stanford University Press. ISBN 978-0-8047-4687-8.
- Hsu, Madeline Y. (2015). The Good Immigrants: How the Yellow Peril Became the Model Minority. Princeton University Press. ISBN 978-0-691-17621-5.
- Hsu, Madeline Y. (2017). Asian American History: A Very Short Introduction. Oxford University Press. ISBN 978-0-19-021976-5.

Edited Works

- Co-edited with Sucheng Chan. Chinese Americans and the Politics of Race and Culture. Temple University Press, 2008.
- Editor. Chinese American Transnational Politics by Him Mark Lai. University of Illinois Press, 2010. Honorable Mention, 2012 Association for Asian American Studies History Book Award.
- Co-edited with Maddalena Marinari and Maria Cristina Garcia. A Nation of Immigrants Reconsidered: U.S. Society in an Age of Restriction, 1924-1965. University of Illinois Press, 2019.
- Co-edited with Marcelo Borges and Donna Gabaccia. Cambridge History of Global Migrations, Vol. II. Cambridge University Press, 2023.
- With Borges, Hsu co-edits the Studies of World Migration book series published by the University of Illinois Press.
