= Mark C. Elliott =

American historian

- Other name: 欧立德

Academic background
- Education: Yale University (BA, MA); University of California, Berkeley (PhD)
- Doctoral advisor: Frederic Wakeman
- Influences: Jonathan Spence; Beatrice Bartlett

Academic work
- Institutions: Harvard University
- Doctoral students: David Brophy; Max Oidtmann
- Notable ideas: New Qing History

Mark C. Elliott (Chinese name: Chinese: 欧立德; pinyin: Ōu Lìdé) is an American sinologist who is the Mark Schwartz Professor of Chinese and Inner Asian History at Harvard University, where he is Vice Provost for International Affairs. He is also a seminal figure of New Qing History school of thought.

== Biography ==
Elliot graduated summa cum laude from Yale University with a Bachelor of Arts in history in 1981 and a Master of Arts in East Asian studies in 1984. As an undergraduate at Yale College, he developed an interest in the Chinese language and East Asian history, and was a student of Jonathan Spence and Beatrice Bartlett. After several years of study and archival research in Taiwan, mainland China, and Japan, he earned his Ph.D. from the University of California, Berkeley, specializing in the history of the Qing dynasty under the guidance of Frederic Wakeman. Thereafter, he taught at the University of California, Santa Barbara and the University of Michigan, before coming to Harvard in 2003. He teaches a wide variety of courses, including the History of Relations between China and Inner Asia, the famous "Qing Documents" seminar, and regular reading courses in Manchu documents, along with the module on the Qing dynasty offered via Harvard Online as "Modern China’s Foundations: The Manchus and the Qing" Elliott also oversees the Department's instruction in Manchu and Mongolian language.

Elliott is considered a prominent scholar of the New Qing History school. His The Manchu Way: The Eight Banners and Ethnic Identity in Late Imperial China is a representative work of this approach to the history of the last dynasty, which focuses attention on the important part played by Inner Asian political traditions and ethnic identity in the success of Manchu rule over China. Elliott's second book, a biography of the Qianlong emperor (r. 1736-1795), explores these themes through the life of China's longest-ruling monarch.

From 2010-11 and again in 2013-15, Elliott was director of the Fairbank Center for Chinese Studies. Beginning in 2015, he has served as Vice Provost of International Affairs at Harvard. In March 2018, Elliott inaugurated Harvard's Lakshmi Mittal South Asia Institute in New Delhi.

== Selected works ==
In a statistical overview derived from writings by and about Mark Elliott OCLC/WorldCat encompasses roughly 10+ works in 20+ publications in 3 languages and 600+ library holdings.

Books

- Emperor Qianlong: Son of Heaven, Man of the World. Pearson-Longman, 2009.
- New Qing Imperial History: The Making of Inner Asian Empire at Qing Chengde. Co-edited with James Millward, Ruth Dunnell, and Philippe Forêt. RoutledgeCurzon, 2004.
- The Manchu Way: The Eight Banners and Ethnic Identity in Late Imperial China. Stanford University Press, 2001.
- The Archives of the Bordered Red Banner: Research Guide to the Qing Eight Banners and Catalogue of Materials in the Toyo Bunko. Co-edited with Kanda Nobuo, et al. Toyo Bunko, 2001.

Selected articles and book chapters

- “Zai ershiyi shiji yuedu Lie Wensen : kua shikong de duihua”「在21世纪阅读列文森：跨时空的对话」(Reading Levenson in the 21st century: a conversation across time and space). With Geremie Barmé, Timothy Cheek, Gloria Davies, Madeleine Yue Dong, and Wen-hsin Yeh. Afterword to Liu Wennan, trans. Joseph Levenson, Confucian China and Its Modern Fate: A Trilogy 《儒家中国及其现代命运：三部曲》 (Hong Kong: Chinese University of Hong Kong Press, 2023), pp. 543–584.
- “Jintian women ruhe yuedu Lie Wensen?” 「今天我们如何阅读列文森？」(How do we read Levenson today?). Dushu《读书》532 (2023.7).
- “Xin Qingshi yanjiu de yingxiang yu huiying” 「新清史研究的影响与回应」(The influence of and response to the New Qing History). In Fudan wenshi jiangtang 9 (Beijing: Zhonghua shuju, 2022).
- “Zuowei ‘diguo’ de chuantong Zhongguo” 「作为‘帝国’的传统中国」(Traditional China as “empire”). In Fudan wenshi jiangtang 9 (Beijing: Zhonghua shuju, 2022).
- “Should American Universities Engage with China?” with Daniel Murphy. In Adele Carrai, Jennifer Rudolph, and Michael Szonyi, eds., The China Questions 2 (Cambridge, MA: Harvard University Press, 2022).
- “Manchu Sources and the Problem of Translation.” In Barbara Mittler, Joachim & Natascha Gentz and Catherine Vance Yeh, eds., China in the World – the World in China: A Transcultural Perspective (Gossenberg: Ostasien Verlag, 2019), pp. 251–264.
- “What Is the Source of Ethnic Tension in China?” In Jennifer Rudolph and Michael Szonyi, eds., The China Questions (Cambridge, MA: Harvard University Press, 2018), pp. 33–42.
- “Dang women tan ‘diguo’ shi, women tanxie shenma: huayu, fangfa yu gainian kaogu” 「当我们谈“帝国”时, 我们谈些什么——话语、方法与概念考古」 (What are we talking about when we talk about ‘empire’? Discourse, method, and begriffsgeschichte). In Exploration and Free Ideas《探索与争鸣》June 2018, pp. 49–57.
- “The Case of the Missing Indigene: Debate over a ‘Second-Generation Ethnic Policy’.” The China Journal 73 (January 2015), pp. 186-213.
- “Abel-Rémusat, la langue mandchoue et la sinologie.” Comptes Rendues de l’Academie des Inscriptions et Belles-Lettres 2014.2 (April–June), pp. 973–993. Revised version published in Pierre-Etienne Will and Michel Fink, eds., Jean-Pierre Abel-Rémusat et ses successeurs. Deux cents ans de sinologie française en France et en Chine (Paris: Peeters, 2020), pp. 49–69.
- “Frontier Stories: The Periphery as Central in Qing History.” Frontiers of History in China 9.3 (December 2014), pp. 336–360.
- “Chuantong Zhongguo shi yige diguo ma” 「传统中国是一个帝国吗」(Was traditional China an empire?). Dushu 《读书》2014.1, pp. 29–40.
- “Ershiyishiji ruhe shuxie Zhongguo lishi: ‘Xin Qingshi’ yanjiu de yingxiang yu huiying” 「21世纪如何书写中国历史：“新清史”研究的影响与回应」(Writing Chinese history in the 21st c.: the influence and response to the “New Qing History”), with Ding Yizhuang 定宜庄. In Peng Wei 彭卫ed., Lishixue pinglun《历史学评论》(Critical Historical Review), vol. 1 (Beijing: SSAP, 2013), pp. 116–146.
- “Guanyu xin Qingshi de jige wenti” 「关于新清史的几个问题」, in Liu Wenpeng et al., eds., Qingdai zhengzhi yu guojia rentong 《清代政治与国家认同》(Politics and national identity in the Qing) (Beijing: Renmin daxue cbs, 2012), pp. 3–15.
- “Hushuo 胡說: The Northern Other and the Naming of the Han Chinese.” In Thomas Mullaney, et al., eds., Critical Han Studies (Berkeley: University of California Press, 2012).
- “National Minds and Imperial Frontiers: Inner Asia and China in the New Century.” In William Kirby, ed., The People’s Republic of China at 60: An International Assessment (Cambridge, MA: Harvard University Press, 2011).
- “Shindai Manshūjin no aidentitii to Chūgoku tōchi”「清代満洲人のアイデンティティイと中国統治」 (Manchu identity and rule in the Qing). In Okada Hidehiro, ed., Shinchō to ha nani ka 『清朝とは何か』 (What was the Qing?), Special Number 16 of Kan: History, Environment, Civilization (Tokyo: Fujiwara Shoten, 2009), pp. 108–123.
- “Manshū tōan to shin Shinchō shi” 「満洲档案と新清朝史」 (Manchu archives and the new Qing history). In Hosoya Yoshio, ed., Shinchōshi kenkyū no aratanaru chihei 『清朝史研究の新たなる地平』 (New perspectives on Qing historical research) (Tokyo: Yamakawa, 2008, pp. 124–139.
- “The Manchus as Ethnographic Subject in the Qing.” In Joseph Esherick, Madelein Zelin, and Wen-hsin Yeh, eds., Empire, Nation, and Beyond: Chinese History in Late Imperial and Modern Times. Berkeley: Institute of East Asian Studies, 2006.
- "Manwen dang'an yu xin Qingshi" 「滿文檔案與新清史」 (Manchu archives and the new Qing history). National Palace Museum Quarterly 『故宮博物院季刊』, December 2006.
- "La Chine moderne: les mandchous et la définition de la nation." Annales. Histoire, Sciences Sociales, November–December 2006.
- "Ethnicity in the Qing Eight Banners." In Pamela Kyle Crossley, Helen Siu, and Donald Sutton, eds., Empire at the Margins: Culture, Ethnicity, and Frontier in Early Modern China. University of California Press, 2006.
- "Whose Empire Shall It Be? Manchu Figurations of Historical Process in the Early Seventeenth Century." In Lynn Struve, ed., Time and Temporality in the Ming-Qing Transition (Honolulu: University of Hawai'i Press, 2005), pp. 30–72.
- "Highlights of the Manchu-Mongolian Collection." Co-authored with James Bosson. In Patrick Hanan, ed., The Treasures of the Yenching. Harvard-Yenching Institute, 2003.
- "The Eating Crabs Youth Book." In Susan Mann and Yu-yin Cheng, eds., Under Confucian Eyes: Documents on Gender in East Asian History. University of California Press, 2001.
- "The Manchu-Language Archives of the Qing and the Origins of the Palace Memorial System." Late Imperial China 22.1 (June 2001).
- "The Limits of Tartary: Manchuria in Imperial and National Geographies." Journal of Asian Studies 59.3 (August 2000).
- "Manchu Widows and Ethnicity in Qing China." Comparative Studies in Society and History 41.1 (January 1999).
- "Chūgoku no dai'ichi rekishi tōankanzō naikaku to kyūchū Manbun tōan no gaijutsu" (An outline of the Manchu holdings of the Grand Secretariat and Imperial Palace archives at the No. 1 Historical Archives, Beijing). Tōhōgaku 85 (January 1993).
- Bannerman and Townsman: "Ethnic Tension in Nineteenth-Century Jiangnan". Late Imperial China 11.1 (June 1990).
