= Chinn =

- Pronunciation: /tʃɪn/
- Language: English

Other names
- Variant form: Chin

Chinn is a surname, originating both in England and among overseas Chinese communities.

== Origins and statistics ==
As an English surname, it originated as a nickname for people with prominent chins, from Middle English chinne or chyn. It is also a spelling, based on the pronunciation in some varieties of Chinese including Hakka, of the surname pronounced Chen in Mandarin. The similarly spelled surname Chin also shares both of these origins.

According to statistics cited by Patrick Hanks, 1,316 people on the island of Great Britain and four on the island of Ireland bore the surname Chinn in 2011. In 1881 there were 1,032 people with the surname in Great Britain, primarily at Warwickshire and Cornwall.

The 2010 United States census found 6,211 people with the surname Chinn, making it the 5,601st-most-common name in the country. This represented an increase in absolute numbers, but a decrease in relative frequency, from 6,146 (5,220th-most-common) in the 2000 census. In both censuses, about half of the bearers of the surname identified as White, one-quarter as Asian, and one-fifth as Black.

== People ==
- Adrienne Chinn (1960), Canadian author
- Alva Chinn (fl. 2011), American model
- Andrew Chinn (1915–1996), American artist and art educator of Chinese descent
- Anthony Chinn (1930–2000), Guyanese-born British actor
- Benjamen Chinn (1921–2009), American photographer
- Betty Kwan Chinn (fl. 1980s–present), American philanthropist who works with homeless people
- Bob Chinn (film director) (born 1943), American pornographic film director
- Bob Chinn (restaurateur) (1923–2022), American restaurateur, owner of Bob Chinn's Crab House
- Bobby Chinn (born 1954), New Zealand chef and television presenter
- Carl Chinn (born 1956), English historian
- Conor Chinn (born 1987), American soccer forward
- George M. Chinn (1902–1987), United States Marine Corps colonel and weapons expert
- Howard A. Chinn (1906–?), American audio engineer
- Ian Chinn (1917–1956), Australian rules footballer
- Jeanne Chinn, American actress
- Jeremy Chinn (born 1998), American football player
- Joseph W. Chinn (1866–1936), American lawyer and judge from Virginia
- Julia Chinn
- Kathy L. Chinn (fl. 2004–present), American politician from Missouri
- Ken Chinn (1962–2020), Canadian punk rock musician
- Lenore Chinn (born 1949), American painter
- Lori Tan Chinn (fl. 1982–present), American actress
- Marlin Chinn (born 1970), American basketball coach
- Menzie Chinn (born 1961), American economist
- May Edward Chinn (1896–1980), African-American woman physician
- Mike Chinn (born 1954), English horror, fantasy, and comics writer
- Nicky Chinn (born 1945), English songwriter and record producer
- Oscar Chinn (fl. 1934), British transport company operator in Congo, involved in the Permanent Court of International Justice's Oscar Chinn Case
- Phyllis Chinn (born 1941), American mathematician
- Simon Chinn (fl. 1997–present), British film producer
- Thomas Withers Chinn (1791–1852), American politician from Louisiana
- Sir Trevor Chinn (born 1935), British businessman and philanthropist
- Trevor Chinn (glaciologist) (1937–2018), New Zealand scientist
- Wing Sam Chinn (1897–1974), Chinese-American architect

== Fictional characters ==
- Maya Chinn, minor character in the American soap opera Passions

== See also ==
- Chin (surname)
