= List of Chinese American associations =

This is a list of Chinese American associations. Some of these Chinese Associations may also exist outside the United States.

== B ==
- Bing Kong Tong 秉公堂

== C ==
- Camau Association of America (Thien Hau Temple) 美國金甌同鄉聯誼會 (天后宮)
- Cantonese American Association
- Chinese American Citizens Alliance 同源會
- Chinese-American Museum of Chicago (CAMOC) 芝加哥美洲华裔博物馆 - 李秉枢中心
- Chinese Consolidated Benevolent Association 中華會館 / 中華公所
- Chinese Freemasons (Chee Kong Tong) 洪門致公堂
- Chinese-American Planning Council 華人策劃協會
- Chinese Historical Society of America 美國華人歷史學會
- Chinese Historical Society of Southern California 南加州華人歷史學會
- Committee of 100 (United States) 百人会

== H ==
- Hip Sing Association 協勝公會
- Hop Sing Tong 合勝堂

== K ==
- Kong Chow Clan Association 岡州會館

== L ==
- Lin Sing Association 聯成公所
- Lung Kong Tin Yee Association 龍岡親義公所

== N ==
- National Association of Chinese-Americans 全美华人协会

== O ==
- On Leong Chinese Merchants Association 安良工商會
- Organization of Chinese Americans 美華協會

== S ==
- Soo Yuen Benevolent Association 遡源堂 / 遡源公所
- Suey Sing Association 萃勝工商會

== U ==
- United Chinese Society of Hawaii 檀香山中華總會館

== Y ==
- Ying On Labor & Merchant Association 英端工商會
