= Murder of the Zhuo family =

2013 murders in Brooklyn, New York City

The murder of the Zhuo family occurred on October 26, 2013, when perpetrator Mingdong Chen murdered his cousin's wife and four children in their Brooklyn, New York home.

== Crime ==
Chen, who was an illegal immigrant to the United States and living temporarily with his cousin's family, murdered his cousin's four children, Linda Zhuo (9), Amy Zhuo (7), Kevin Zhuo (5), and William Zhuo (1), and their mother, Qiao Zhen Li (37), in their home in the Sunset Park neighborhood of Brooklyn, in New York City. All five died of cut wounds to the neck made with a butcher knife. The perpetrator was discovered at the scene of the crime, spattered in blood. He said, "I know I am done."

Chen had previously lived in Chicago and in Florida as well as in New York, and had been staying with his cousin's family for about a week at the time of the killings.

== Perpetrator ==
Chen was an unemployed transient and an illegal immigrant. He arrived in the United States in 2004.

He underwent psychiatric treatment and evaluation for fitness to stand trial.

According to the China Daily, Chen arrived in the United States from Fujian age 16 with $70,000 debt to the "snakehead" gang that smuggled him into the country illegally and worked in Chinese take-out restaurants to pay off his debt. He applied for asylum in the United States in 2007 with fake testimonials that a fraudulent Chinatown immigration agency helped him forge, but lost his final appeal in June 2013.

=== Motive ===
The perpetrator is said to have been disappointed with his failure to succeed in America, and jealous of those who had found employment. According to Edward Chiu, head of the Lin Sing Association, arguments and even fights between new immigrants and relatives who have begun to establish themselves are not uncommon, and are a result of the unrealistic expectation many Chinese immigrants have of becoming rich in America, and the resentment they experience when they fail where others succeed.

Chen, who did not speak English, had held a series of restaurant jobs as a waiter, but had been fired after a week or two.

NYPD Chief Philip Banks III stated that during his confession, made via a translator, that he killed his cousin's family because he had failed to make it in America and was envious of his cousin, who was more successful. Chen stated that, "Everyone here is doing better than me."

Several Chinese-language newspapers reported that Chen had been the victim of a Green card marriage scam in which a woman promised to marry him in exchange for a sum of money, then made off with the money. Chen's gambling buddy, Erdong Chen (37) told a reporter that Chen had told him that he had paid his fiancé $70,000 and that she had run off with the money. According to the friend, the day before the killings Chen told him that he wanted to kill his absconded fiancée.

== Arrest, trial, and conviction ==
Chen punched a police officer when apprehended and later made a full confession of the crime.

Chen, who spoke little English, pled guilty to three counts of second-degree murder and two counts of first-degree manslaughter, speaking through an interpreter.

He was convicted and sentenced to 125 years to life in prison.

== Film ==
The 2017 indie film Gold Fortune by Shiyu “Rhyme” Lu revisits the murder in the context of the struggles of new immigrants to America.

== See also ==
- Illegal immigration to the United States and crime
