= Parcel C protests =

1993 protests in Boston, Massachusetts

The Parcel C protests were a community organized grassroots movement in the Chinatown of Boston, Massachusetts led by the Coalition to Protect Parcel C for Chinatown, which formed in response to the 1993 deal between Boston Redevelopment Authority (BRA) and New England Medical Center (NEMC) to create a hospital parking garage in Chinatown. The space in question, named Parcel C, is a small plot of land bordered by Oak Street, Nassau Street, May Place, and Ash Street. The surrounding areas were primarily residential, with a day care center directly adjacent to the plot, which raised health and safety concerns. The protest helped bring awareness to environmental injustice in urban cities and cultivated systems and methods for successful activism in a non-English speaking community.

== Background ==
Boston's Chinatown has historically been the most crowded neighborhood in Boston; in 1990, there were over 111 residents per acre. It also has the least amount of open space per resident, at about 9600 residents per acre. The population is primarily recent immigrants, and over 2/3 of residents speak Chinese at home. In terms of land, Chinatown is a smaller neighborhood of 43 acres. In 1990, 27% of the land in Chinatown was owned by Tufts University or New England Medical Center (NEMC). Geographically, it is bordered by the Massachusetts Turnpike to the south and the Southeast Expressway to the east. During Boston's period of urban renewal in the 1960s, the homes on the land that would later be called Parcel C were seized by eminent domain by the Boston Redevelopment Agency (BRA). It was later sold to Tufts and NEMC, but remained untouched for 20 years.

=== Medical Center Garage Proposal ===
In 1985, the NEMC made its first proposal for Parcel C: an 850 car garage that would require the demolition of Acorn Day Care, the only public day care facility in Chinatown at the time. Both the Chinatown Neighborhood Council (CNC), City Hall's advisory group on Chinatown, and the BRA quickly declined. In 1987, the NEMC proposed a smaller, 600 car garage on Parcel C. It was denied again by the BRA and CNC, and resulted in the BRA announcing that Parcel C would be designated for a 90,000 sq. ft. Chinatown community center. NEMC responded with a lawsuit, which was ultimately thrown out. In the settlement, NEMC would receive 2 adjacent parcels of land, hence the name Parcel C.

However, due to economic downturn in the early 1990s, the community center lost funding and Parcel C remained untouched. Then, NEMC proposed $11 million to buy back the land for a 455 car garage, in which 55 spots would be reserved for Chinatown residents, and 10,000 sq. ft. for a small community center. At this point, the CNC was composed of business interests rather than community residents and activists and its operating costs were funded by the NEMC. The CNC voted on May 17 to support the plan by a 12–2 vote, with 3 members abstaining. Despite community opposition and protest, the BRA, who at the time faced an $8 million deficit for the fiscal year, approved the garage on June 10, 1993.

== Protest ==
Community activists started by circulating petitions opposing and fliers to disseminate information regarding the garage proposal on Parcel C. The days before the BRA's hearing for preliminary approval for the garage plan on June 10, the Chinatown community organized a rally in front of the NEMC to express their protest to the proposal, in which over 250 community members participated. In response to the preliminary approval, Chinatown community activists and residents united to form the Coalition to Protect Parcel C for Chinatown. All meetings were conducted in Cantonese and English. The activists main arguments were that the 8 story parking garage would worsen already existing traffic and pollution problems in the area.

They also argued that the BRA and CNC's decisions were financially influenced, despite both parties denying such. At the time of the hearing, the organizers had already acquired over 2500 signatures in opposition of building the garage, contradicting the CNC's representative decision in May. Andrew Leong, co-chair of the Coalition to Protect Chinatown and Assistant Professor at the Law Center in the College of Public and Community Service at the University of Massachusetts Boston, stated "Like so many minority "leaders" that are recognized as legitimate by white governments, the Chinatown Neighborhood Council acted as City Hall's puppet".

Over time, the Coalition additionally formed alliances with environmental groups such as the American Lung Association, Environmental Diversity Forum, and gained legal support from the Conservation Law Foundation. Health Care for All, a Massachusetts-based advocacy organization, effectively aided the Coalition in gaining public attention, and exposed the NEMC hospital paying thousands of dollars for antique pillow cushions for its CEO.

In July, Director of the BRA, Paul L. Barrett, offered to exchange a parcel of land on Tyler Street for $1, in order to gain the Chinatown residents' support on the NEMC garage. 130 Chinatown residents unanimously rejected the offer, citing that the new land would not outweigh the health and safety hazards posed by the garage.

In late August, the Coalition, along with environmental activist groups and lawyers from Greater Boston Legal Services, presented evidence against the garage on an environmental front to the state's environmental agency. This ultimately resulted in an order for the NEMC to conduct a full environmental review of its proposal. When NEMC completed the report in late February of the following year, the Coalition realized upon reading it that there were still many inadequacies. The states' environmental agency sided with the Coalition, and the hospital was required to prepare a supplemental report.

In September, the Coalition sought out a neutral party, the American Friends Service Committee, to conduct a referendum, which resulted in 1692 against and 42 in favor of the garage. Over the next year, and after 75 published news articles, multiple television broadcasts, several community-organized rallies, legal advocacy, and thousands of letters, the Coalition achieved their goal of preventing construction of the parking garage on Parcel C. In October 1994, Mayor Menino renounced the approval for the NEMC's garage, and instead will designate the land to the Chinese Consolidated Benevolent Association (CCBA) for community use.

=== Outcome ===
While regaining rights to Parcel C was their top priority and a huge success, several members of the Coalition remained dissatisfied. Mayor Menino's decision did not involve any members of the Coalition, rather it was an agreement between the BRA and the CCBA. According to Coalition officials, the CCBA "enjoys a mixed reputation in Chinatown as moderates who have at times knuckled under to financial and political power". According to Nancy Lo, Menino's liaison to the Asian community, "The CCBA is the oldest, most established group in Chinatown...The mayor asked the CCBA to assist him in working out a resolution, and what they had in mind was more in keeping with the mayor's plans for the community". In the end, the Chinatown community had achieved their goal but ultimately still did not have a seat at the decision-making table.

== Significance ==
This movement provided opportunities for previously underrepresented community members, such as the elderly and the non-English speaking, to voice their opinion and concern for Chinatown. Besides their goals for Parcel C, the Coalition paved the way for future organizing in non-English speaking communities. All Coalition meetings were conducted in both English and Chinese. The state's environmental agency required that the second, supplemental environmental report would be translated into Chinese, for the first time in history. Ultimately, the coalition set a precedent for future environmental issues involving linguistic minorities.

As of 2006, the land hosts one of three Boston Chinatown Neighborhood Center locations, and is a certified green building according to the LEED Green Building Rating System.
