= The Search for Modern China =

1990 history book by Jonathan Spence

- Author: Jonathan D. Spence
- Genre: History
- Publisher: Century Hutchinson, W. W. Norton & Company
- Publication date: 1990
- ISBN: 978-0-393-97351-8

The Search for Modern China is a history book by Jonathan D. Spence, published by Century Hutchinson and W. W. Norton & Company. The first edition was published in 1990, updated by the second edition in 1999, and the third edition in 2013 with new scholarship.

The first edition chronicles the history of China from the late Ming dynasty (circa 1600) to the 1989 Tiananmen Square protests. Acclaimed for its "narrative techniques" and "wealth of illustrations", the book went on The New York Times' best-seller list and is widely adopted as a standard text for university-level courses on Chinese history.

== Contents and editions ==
The Search for Modern China narrates China's trajectory from the late Ming collapse through the Qing rise and crises, the 1911 Revolution and Republican fragmentation, the Sino-Japanese War and Civil War, to the PRC's Maoist campaigns (Land Reform, Great Leap Forward, Cultural Revolution) and the post-1978 reform era, ending—via later editions—with the 1990s–2000s market transformation and persistent one-party rule. Across this sweep Spence frames a recurring "search" for modernity—an effort to reconcile indigenous traditions with foreign pressures. Spence stated that he chose 1600 as the starting point so he could "get a full sense of how China's current problems have arisen, and of what resources – intellectual, economic, and emotional – the Chinese can call upon to solve them." According to Spence, the book was about the efforts to create a "Modern China", which he defined as "both integrated and receptive, fairly sure of its own identify, yet able to join others on equal terms in the quest for new markets, new technologies, new ideas." By this definition, Spence held that a Modern China had not yet come into being.

The Search for Modern China was developed from Spence's high-demand lecture series at Yale. Its 1990 publication right after the Tiananmen Square protest draw heightened interest from the public, as it provided valuable historical background and contexts to understand the event. However, there are issues with the book's references, as it relies on a single source for its account of the protest, while selectively reporting details from this source. Among other issues, Spence omits all details of protester's attempts to break into government officials' residences, as well as all attempts by local and national official's attempts to resolve the protest peacefully. In another instance, Spence relies heavily on The Private Life of Chairman Mao, which has been widely discredited since its publication. Yet, the book adopts a "vivid storytelling" of "individual lives and odd moments", unfolding the big picture of Chinese history in small details.

The 1990 edition has a total page count of 876 with 49 maps, 49 tables, and dozens of illustrations. There is an additional section containing endnotes, as well as a Further Reading section that provides supplementary materials dedicated to each chapter. Munford stated the items of photography "are refreshingly different from the ones that are normally reproduced in Chinese history books", "especially the black and white" ones. Very little hanzi are in the book. According to Munford, the ones there "are so poorly printed as to hardly be legible."

The second edition published in 1999 incorporated new discussions including the early development of Chinese nationalism, the roots of Chinese communism and alternatives to Mao, among others; as well as a new Chapter on economic, cultural, and political developments since 1989.

The third edition in 2013 extends the narrative of modern China to include significant changes from the 1990s. It covers China's extensive social and economic transformation, growing integration into the global economy, and its increasing regional and international political and military influence, while highlighting the Chinese Communist Party's continued hold on political power. The revised final chapter explores these developments alongside ongoing issues, such as urban-rural wealth inequality, difficulties maintaining central authority in western regions, ethnic tensions between minority groups and the Han majority, and disputes regarding control over Tibet and the treatment of Tibetan populations.

A companion book containing primary sources supplementing Spence's book became available with the second edition in 1999, with updates in 2014, edited by Princeton professor Janet Chen and others. The Documentary Collection presented a "sound and broad" selections of translated documents, letters, journalism, treaties, declarations, speeches, and court dispositions, many of which were translated into English for the first time.

The book has been translated into Chinese and published in Taiwan with its original contents and scope. The mainland edition covers chapters from 1600 to 1949. Post-1949 chapters with critical analysis of Mao Zedong, the Cultural Revolution, Deng Xiaoping, and the 1989 Tiananmen Square incident were censored out of mainland China editions.

== Reception ==
George Jochnowitz of National Review wrote that the book had been "highly praised"; Jochnowitz added that he felt this was "deservedly so", citing the "relaxed and natural style" and "fascinating information".

Theresa Munford in Far Eastern Economic Review, praised the book as "well-designed", and described it as "more of a textbook" than The Gate of Heavenly Peace, an earlier work by Spence on Chinese revolutions from the late nineteenth to the late twentieth century, which she described as lighter reading.

Vera Schwarcz of The New York Times wrote that Spence's "excellent" book was a best starting point to understand China's past burdens, struggles, and efforts in its modernization. She commended the book's "thematic focus", "wealth of illustrations", and "narrative technique" that were not present in other books of similar topics.

Frank Ching, when commenting on the first edition, stated that of Spence's works, this was "the most ambitious" for its encyclopedic scope.

Arif Dirlik described the book's writing style as an "easy fluency that makes it accessible to the nonspecialist reader."

== Bibliography ==
- Ching, Frank (1990b). "Reviewed work: The Search for Modern China, Jonathan D. Spence". Journal of the Hong Kong Branch of the Royal Asiatic Society. 30: 336–339. JSTOR 23889775.
- Dirlik, Arif (1992). "Sisyphus in China". Transition (55): 94–104. doi:10.2307/2934853. JSTOR 2934853.
- Jochnowitz, George (1990-08-06). "Read China". National Review. Vol. 42, no. 15. New York City. p. 43. ProQuest 229616121.
- Spence, Jonathan D. (1990). The search for modern China (1st ed.). New York, N.Y.: Norton.
