= David Brophy (historian) =

Australian historian of Modern Chinese history

- Awards: ARC Discovery Early Career Research Fellowship

Academic background
- Education: Harvard University
- Thesis: 'Tending to unite?: The origins of Uyghur nationalism' (2011)
- Doctoral advisor: Mark Elliott

Academic work
- Institutions: University of Sydney (2013–present); Australian National University (2011–2013)
- Main interests: Modern Chinese history, international relations history
- Notable works: China Panic: Australia's Alternative to Paranoia and Pandering (2021)
- Website: University of Sydney Homepage

David John Brophy is an Australian historian of Modern Chinese history at the University of Sydney where he is senior lecturer. He is noted for his work on the Xinjiang Uyghur Autonomous Region and his contribution to the debate in Australia on the Sino-Australian relationship, for which he has received significant press coverage.

== Academic work ==
In 2011 Brophy completed his PhD at Harvard University in the Committee on Inner Asian and Altaic Studies (IAAS)., where he studied under Mark Elliott. After graduating, in 2011, Brophy accepted a position at Australian National University, where he was a member of the Australian Centre on China in the World. In 2013 Brophy moved to the University of Sydney to be a member of its Department of History.

Brophy has published three monographs as well as contributed numerous chapters and journal article. His most notable work to date is China Panic: Australia's Alternative to Paranoia and Pandering, which was published in 2021. However he has written other books, including Uyghur Nation: Reform and Revolution on the Russia-China Frontier in 2016.

Brophy has written variously for the Guardian Australia, The Monthly, the Australian Book Review, The China Story, The Sydney Morning Herald and the Conversation. As early as 2009 – when he was a PhD candidate – Brophy was critical of the Chinese Government's approach towards the Uighurs. In 2021 Brophy co-signed a letter in support of Dr Joanne Smith Finley, an academic targeted by the Chinese Government in the United Kingdom.

=== Sino-Australian relations ===
With his most recent book he has advocated for a third way approach to the Sino-Australian relationship, one that neither capitulates to the People's Republic of China, nor one that seeks to provoke hostilities in the bilateral relationship.

"What we need is a position not beholden to the paranoid vision of the security agencies or to the priorities of trade, but one that lives up to its profession of universal values."

Brophy argues that this is a societal problem, not just a governmental one. An example is the predicament that Australian universities face:

"What this highlights, I think, is the need for a perspective that’s independent of both the government and the corporate university, one that’s able to make the necessary criticisms of universities as institutions and international actors, without falling into uncritical subservience to the government’s foreign-policy objectives. This is not the first time that universities have had to face this challenge. During the first cold war, through both enticements and pressure, western universities were encouraged to align their work with the state’s diplomatic and military interests. The conditions then were not conducive to free, critical inquiry, and they’re not likely to be a second time around either."
