= Chinese Consolidated Benevolent Association =

Overseas Chinese association in North America

- Traditional Chinese: 中華會館
- Simplified Chinese: 中华会馆
Transcriptions
Standard Mandarin
- Hanyu Pinyin: Zhōnghuá Huìguǎn
Yue: Cantonese
- Jyutping: Zung^{1}wa^{4} Wui^{6}gun^{2}

Alternative Chinese name
- Traditional Chinese: 中華公所
- Simplified Chinese: 中华公所
Transcriptions
Standard Mandarin
- Hanyu Pinyin: Zhōnghuá Gōngsuǒ
Yue: Cantonese
- Jyutping: Zung^{1}wa^{4} Gung^{1}so^{2}

Second alternative Chinese name
- Chinese: 六大公司
- Literal meaning: big six companies
Transcriptions
Standard Mandarin
- Hanyu Pinyin: Liù Dà Gōngsī
Yue: Cantonese
- Jyutping: Luk^{6} Daai^{6} Gung^{1}si^{1}

The Chinese Consolidated Benevolent Association (CCBA) is a historical Chinese association established in various parts of the United States and Canada with large Overseas Chinese communities. The association's clientele were Chinese immigrants of the late 19th and early 20th centuries, mainly from eight districts on the west side of the Pearl River Delta in Guangdong, southern China, and their descendants. The later wave of Chinese immigrants, after 1965, who came from a much wider area in China, did not experience the level of hostility faced by the pioneers and did not join the CCBA, which greatly lessened its influence.

== Names ==
In English, the association is also known by other names, such as the Chinese Six Companies in San Francisco, especially when it began in the 19th century; Chong Wa Benevolent Association in Seattle; and United Chinese Society in Honolulu.

In the Western and Midwestern United States as well as Western Canada, 中華會館 is the common Chinese name. In the Eastern United States and Eastern Canada, 中華公所 is the common Chinese name. 中華 means "Chinese" in the context of the Chinese nation (Zhonghua minzu), while both 會館 and 公所 have historically referred to trade associations.

== Influence ==
Since its organization in the 1850s and formal establishment in 1882 in San Francisco's Chinatown, the Chinese Consolidated Benevolent Association (CCBA) has received diverse publicity from American media. Much of the attention often overlooked inherent cultural differences, leading to misunderstanding by much of the American population. This factor, together with increasing anti-Chinese sentiment, hastened the need for an empowered Chinese organization in the US. Thus, the CCBA was formed out of the need for the Chinese to have organized social, political, and economic structures.

The CCBA was set up to help Chinese people relocate and travel to and from the US, including returning bodies of the deceased to China. With many families fragmented between China and across the US, the association also allowed for communal care of the sick or poor. When the association became more prominent and anti-Chinese sentiment increased, the organization also offered legal and physical protection. Physical abuse was not uncommon in Chinatown from racist Americans. Such incidents led to the rise of groups like the tongs, which were noted to have protected the Chinese from abuse by white miners.

The CCBA also exerted political power, becoming authorized to speak on behalf of Chinatown throughout the US. Its board of directors became increasingly powerful, consisting of wealthy merchants and business people. The board had many dealings with local and federal governments, exerting influence in various methods. One was the use of a Caucasian attorney, who was also the spokesperson of the organization, which likely helped reduce pushback.

Through the 1800s, a large portion of Chinese immigrants to California came for the promise of work in the gold mines, and their contribution was integral to the economic boom the state experienced due to the discovery of gold. When this industry declined, the Chinese found other opportunities, such as fishing, food service, farming, and railroad building. Many in the mid-to-late 19th century argued that the influx of Chinese immigrants decreased job availability for American citizens. However, the job competition theory is disputed due to the strong language barrier that forced many Chinese to create their jobs.

== San Francisco ==
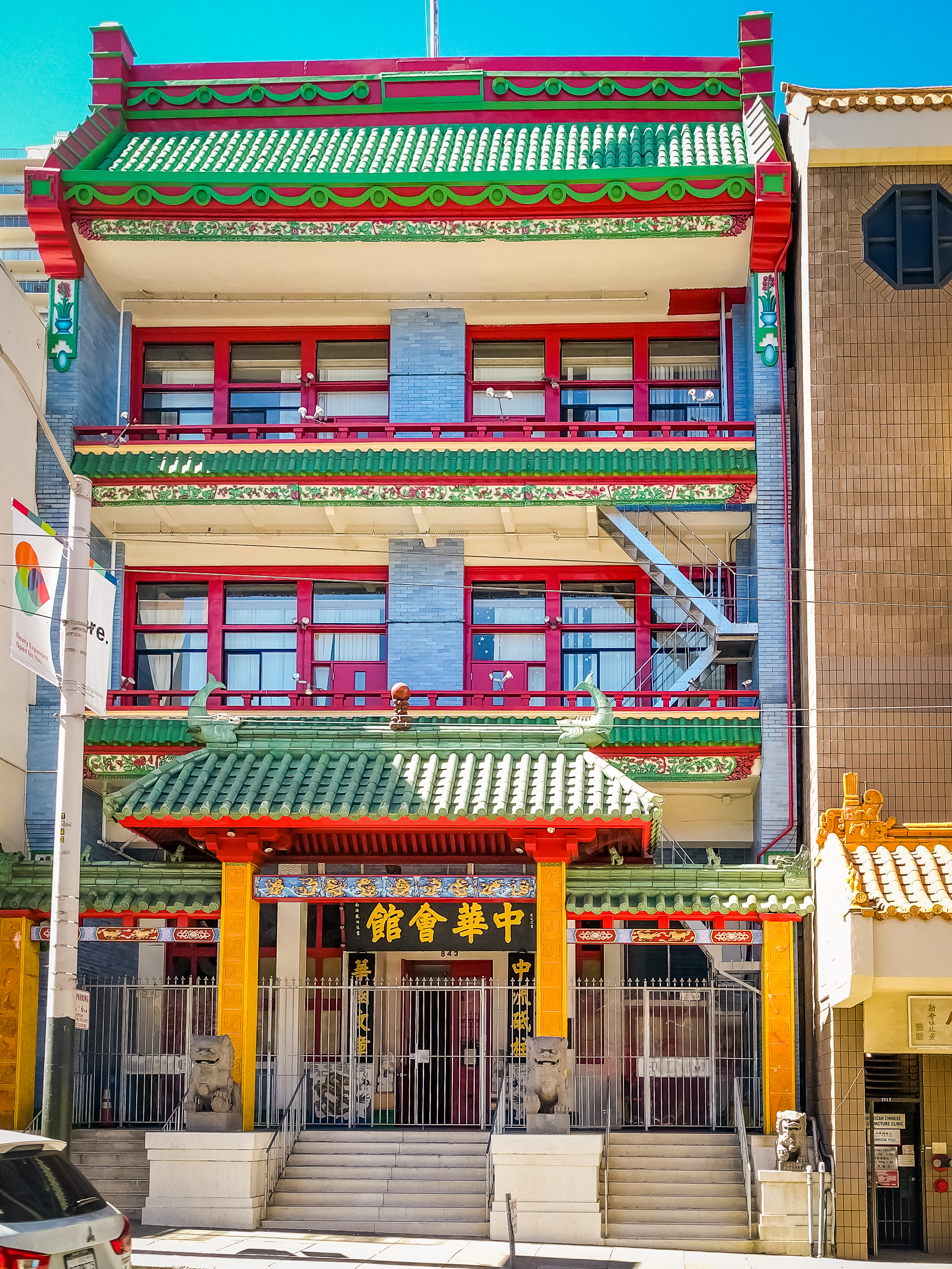
Headquarters of the CCBA (a.k.a. Chinese Six Companies) in San Francisco, on Stockton Street

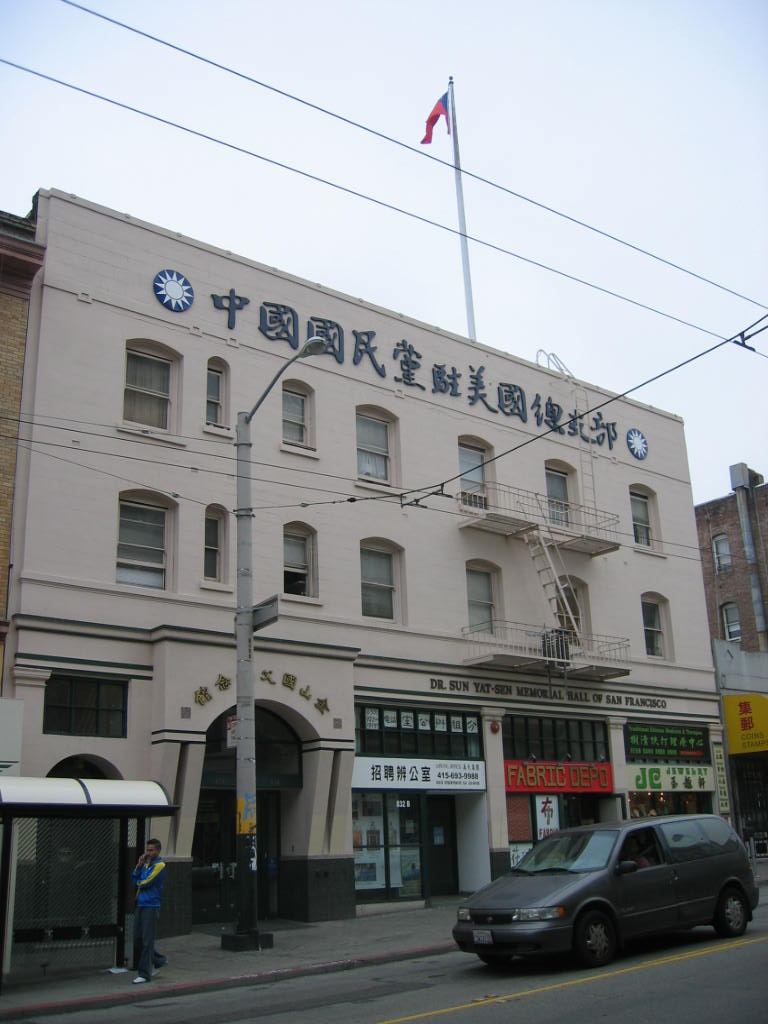
The KMT maintains offices in some of the Chinatowns of the world, and its United States party headquarters are located in San Francisco's Chinatown, on Stockton Street, directly across from the Chinese Six Companies.

=== History ===
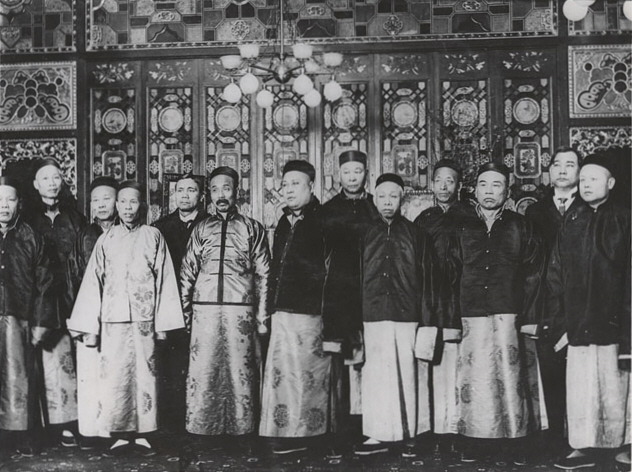
Early officers of San Francisco's Six Companies in traditional Qing dress, with riding jackets over changshan, circa 1890.

Chinese Six Companies in Chinatown, San Francisco
- Headquarters
- Six Companies
- Later addition
1 Chinese Consolidated Benevolent Association (中華會館) headquarters
2 Sam Yup (三邑)
3 Yeong Wo (陽和)
4 Kong Chow (岡州)
5 Ning Yung (寧陽)
6 Hop Wo (合和)
7 Yan Wo (人和)
8 Sue Hing (肇慶)

Upon their arrival during the California gold rush, Chinese immigrants felt the government in Gold Mountain did not protect their interests. To protect and support one another, these Chinese pioneers from the Pearl River Delta formed the Sze Yup and Sam Yap associations in San Francisco's Chinatown. With more Chinese immigrants from other districts, who spoke different dialects, two more associations formed in 1852, followed by two more splitting off Sze Yup. These organizations became the six most important Chinese district associations in California. The associations had some mutual coordination before the CCBA was established, in 1882.

These immigrant organizations were rooted in the Chinese tradition of huiguan (traditional Chinese: 會館; simplified Chinese: 会馆; pinyin: huìguǎn; Jyutping: wui^{6}gun^{2}), viz., support groups for merchants and workers originating from a given area. The vast majority of Chinese in California were from various districts on the west side of the Pearl River Delta, in Guangdong province. Thus, the first huiguan, or ui-kun, as it was locally known in Cantonese San Francisco, the Sam Yap (Chinese: 三邑; pinyin: sānyì; Jyutping: sam1 jap1; lit. 'Three counties') Company, emerged in 1851. It was associated with the Nanhai, Panyu, Shunde, Sanshui, and Xingyun districts. Towards the end of 1851, the Sze Yap (Chinese: 四邑; pinyin: Sìyì; Jyutping: sei3 jap1; lit. 'Four Counties') company of Xinhui, Kaiping, Xinning, and Enping districts was created. This was followed by the Yeong Wo (Chinese: 陽 和) company of Heung-shan, Tung-kun, and Tsang-shing districts, in 1852; and the Hip Kat company, formed by Hakka immigrants from Bow On, Chak Tai, Tung Gwoon, and Chu Mui districts, in 1852. In this manner, "Chinese in California had become organized into four regional dialect groupings" or, as locally known, "four Ooe-Koons, or great Chinese houses of San Francisco".

Owing to internal disputes in the large Sze Yup company, the Ning Yung (Chinese: 寧 陽) company emerged in 1853, and the Hop Wo (Chinese: 合 和) company split off in 1862. In 1867, the twice-reduced Sze Yup was reorganized as the Kong Chow (Chinese: 岡 州) company. Friction within the Hop Wo company led to the formation of the Sue Hing (Chinese: 肇 慶) company in 1878.

The Six Companies served as ambassadors of the Qing government, which did not have a consulate in Chinatown until the end of the 1870s, and provided services for arriving Chinese immigrants and workers in San Francisco. Their early efforts included deterring prostitution in the Chinese community, encouraging Chinese immigrants to lead moral lives, and discouraging excessive Chinese immigration, which was causing hostility towards them. The Six Companies also created a safety net for sick Chinese workers, by lending them money. They opened a Chinese-language school, settled disputes among members, maintained a Chinese census, and helped members send remittances to their home villages through district associations. In 1875, they endorsed the position that continued Chinese immigration caused a general lowering of wages for both whites and Chinese in America.

One of the most important roles of the CCBA was that of defender and sometimes litigator of civil rights. For example, they hired police officers to watch over Chinese businesses and properties in San Francisco. They also hired White lawyers to help them fight anti-Chinese legislation on the city, state, and federal levels. The 1898 landmark case of Wong Kim Ark, which established US citizenship for American-born children of Chinese parents, was successfully argued in the US Supreme Court with the assistance of legal representation from the CCBA.

=== Immigration in the 1960s ===
Though the Six Companies discouraged the continuing immigration of Chinese to the US, the phenomenon persisted. In the 1960s, discrimination began to arise within these Chinese communities. Assimilation of Chinese communities increased through the years, causing a cultural clash between new arrivals and those who were American-born and had assimilated to the culture. Many new Chinese immigrants came to America without savings, as most of their money was spent on transportation to the US. Many immigrant children were also affected by these conditions, having to work when they were not in school, and struggling to learn English. This led to many of the children of new immigrants dropping out and joining gangs that engaged in violence in Chinatown. In 1968, during a human rights commission hearing held in San Francisco, the Wah Ching gang asked for a community clubhouse and a two-year program to help them gain vocational skills and earn high school diplomas. The CCBA advised the commission: "They have not shown that they are sorry or that they will change their ways. They have threatened the community. If you give in to this group, you are only going to have another hundred immigrants come in and have a whole new series of threats and demands."

In 2022, the first female CCBA president, head of the Yan Wo company, was installed.

== New York City ==
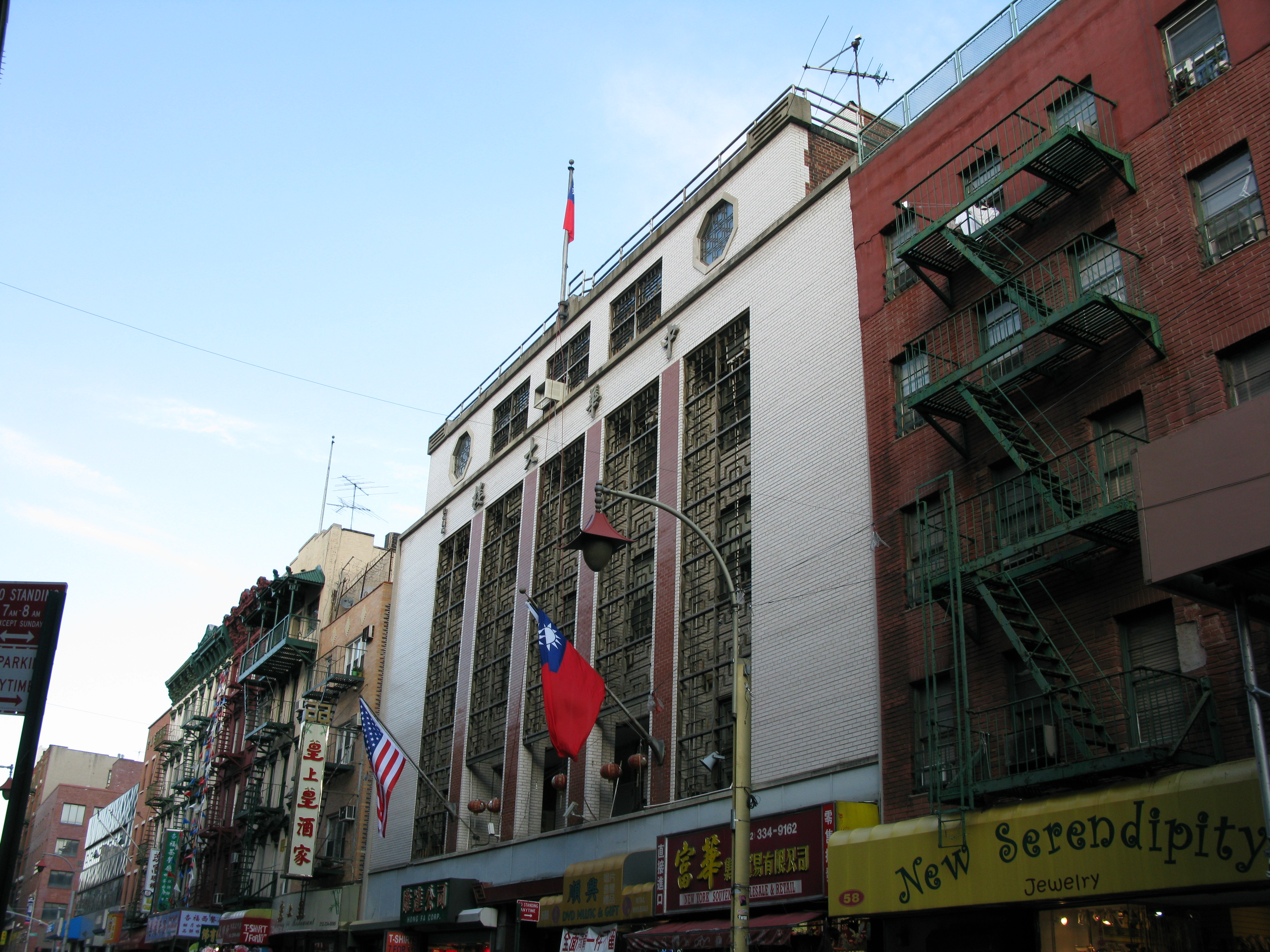
The CCBA in New York

In New York City, the CCBA was established in 1883. It acts as an umbrella organization for sixty member organizations representing a cross section of New York's Chinese community. They include professional and trade organizations, civic, religious, cultural, and women's groups, and organizations such as the Lin Sing Association.

The CCBA spearheaded the move to form the Chinese Voters Federation in May 2004 to encourage qualified Chinese American citizens to register and vote in the 2004 presidential election.

Immediately following the 2004 Indian Ocean earthquake and tsunami, the CCBA led an emergency community-wide campaign to raise funds for the victims, a drive that raised more than $500,000 for the American Red Cross Emergency Response Fund. In September 2005, right after the Hurricane Katrina disaster, the CCBA and Sing Tao Daily teamed up and raised $170,000 for the victims.

The CCBA also works with many mainstream organizations to provide services to the Chinese American community, such as the Visiting Nurse Service of New York and the American Cancer Society. In December 2006, the CCBA and the American Red Cross of Greater New York signed a memorandum of understanding to coordinate programs in Chinatown that will help prepare and train the Chinese community for any kind of emergency.

== Chinese Consolidated Benevolent Association of New England ==
The Chinese Consolidated Benevolent Association of New England, popularly known as CCBA, is a tax-exempt organization established in 1923. Currently with 35 members consisting of family associations and community organizations, the CCBA serves as the umbrella organization for the Chinese communities of New England.

Besides sponsoring activities, the CCBA manages Tai Tung Village and Waterford Place, apartment complexes that provide affordable housing to the Chinese community. Partnering with Chinatown Main Street and other organizations, the CCBA coordinates activities such as the lion dance celebration for the Lunar New Year and the annual August Moon Festival, to attract visitors and to further economic growth in Chinatown; it also hosts dignitary visits to the Chinatown community.

== Seattle ==
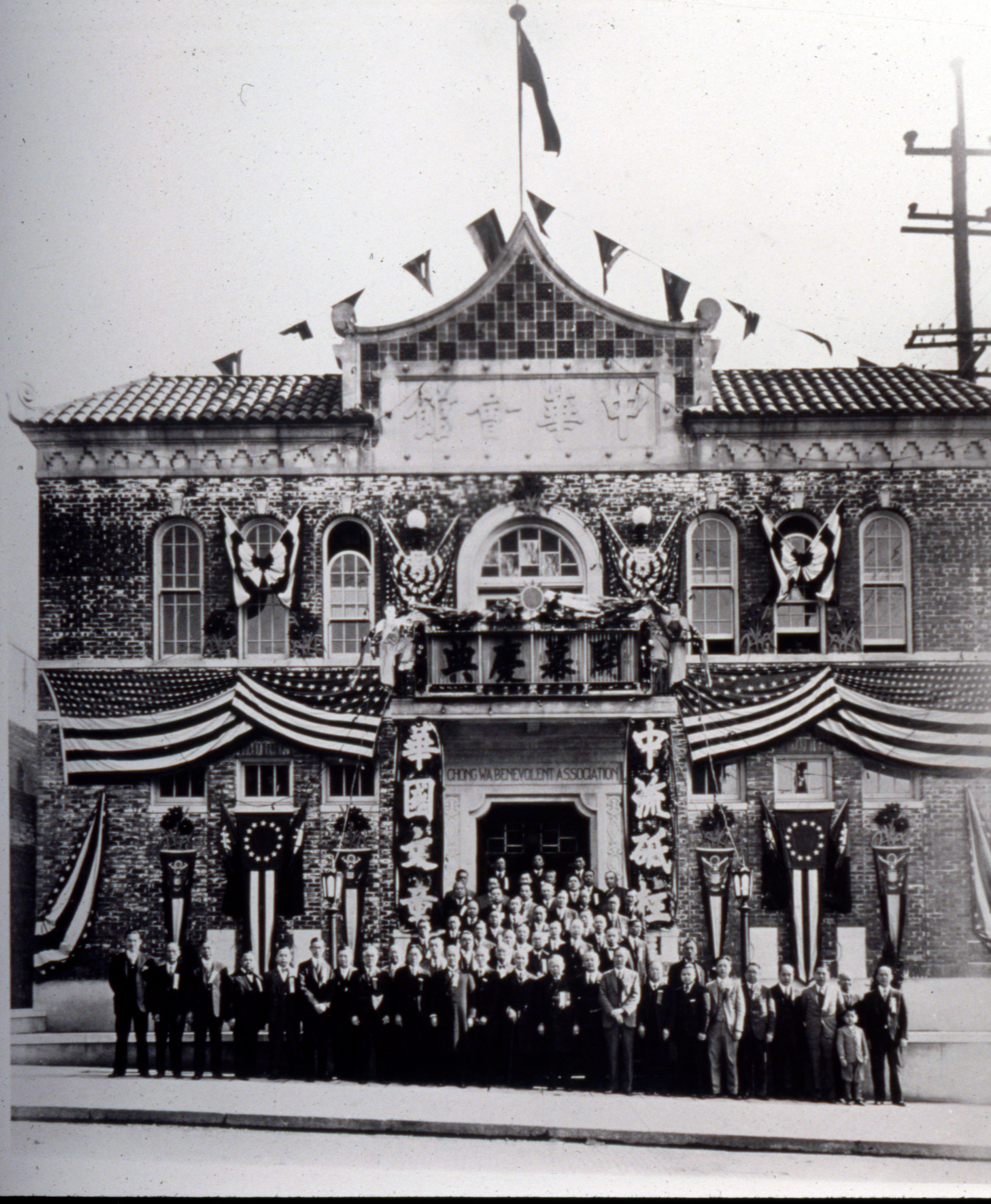
Chong Wa Benevolent Association, Seattle, circa 1930

In Seattle, Washington, the Chong Wa Association was established around 1915. Its aim was to help Chinese immigrants with finding jobs, housing, and loans; support with language needs and legal disputes; as well as political advocacy and conflict mediation. In 1929, the association built a center at 522 Seventh Avenue South, which is still in use. Max A. van House designed the building with the help of Wing Sam Chinn, who later became the first Asian-American to graduate from the University of Washington's architecture department and to hold an architect's license in Washington.

When the U.S. entered World War II, anti-Japanese sentiment was high, and the Chinese Exclusion Act was still enforced. Chong Wa created red and white buttons that read "China" for Chinese Americans to wear as a shield against anti-Japanese sentiment, although these buttons and similarly labeled cars were sometimes shared to protect Japanese Americans as well. Chong Wa also sponsored celebrations for Seattle's Chinese American community, like hosting Chinese New Year events in Chinatown-International District, with dragon teams from San Francisco. Ruby Chow started a public relations effort within Chong Wa to combat the city's racism and fear of Chinese Americans by hosting outreach events to raise awareness of Chinese culture. She formed the Seattle Chinese Community Girls Drill Team with Chong Wa's sponsorship. The association created a dragon team in 1952, and both teams began performing in Seafair.

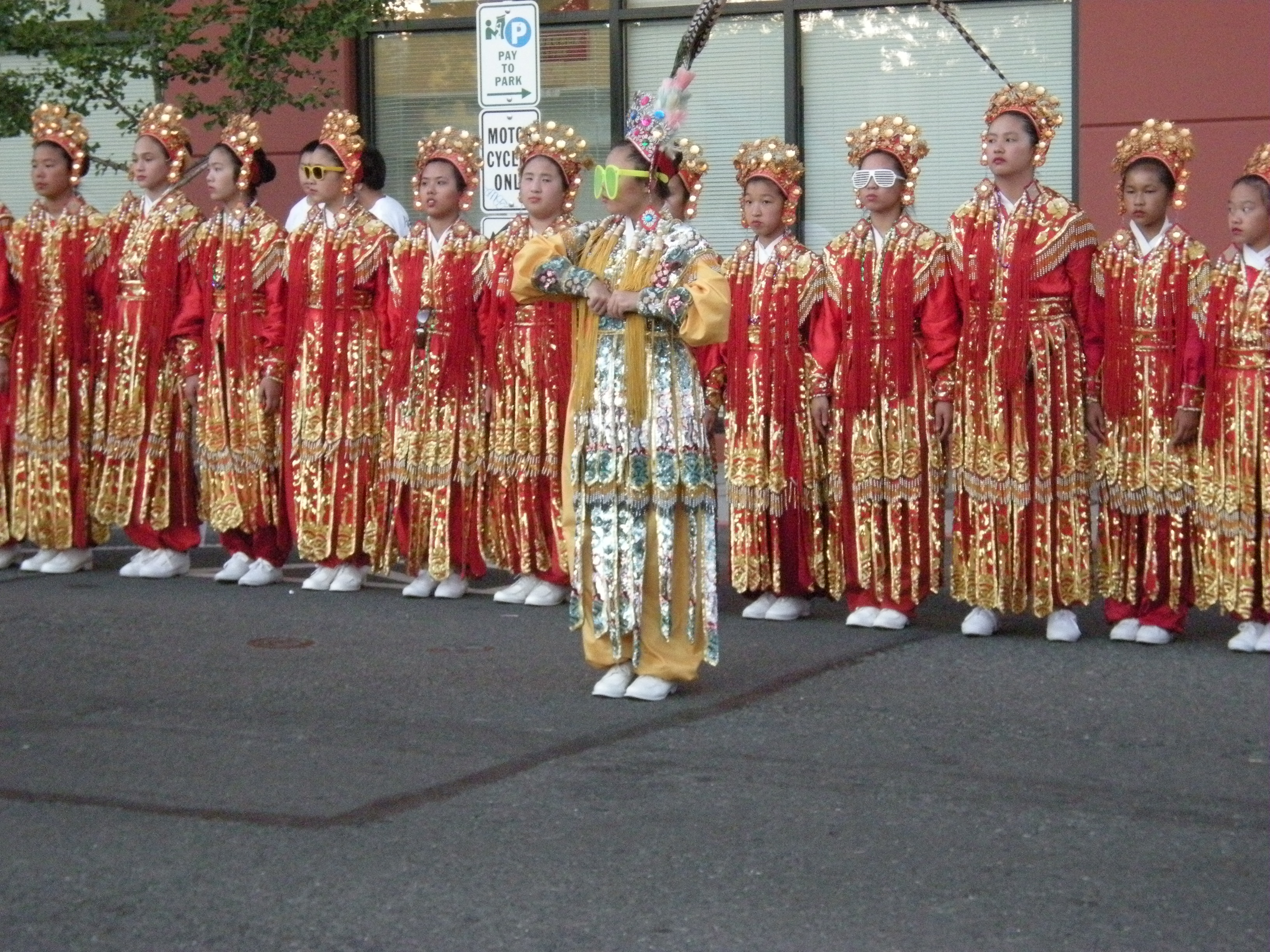
Drill team at 2008 Seafair Chinatown Parade

In 1957, Chow was elected to the Chong Wa board, becoming the first woman to sit on a board of the CCBA. Wing Luke ran for a Seattle City Council position in 1962 and thus became the first Asian-American to hold a major elected office in the U.S. He asked Chong Wa for support during his campaign, but they demurred for the sake of remaining neutral in city politics. In 1975, Chow was elected president of the Chong Wa board, thus becoming the first woman to hold that position for the CCBA.

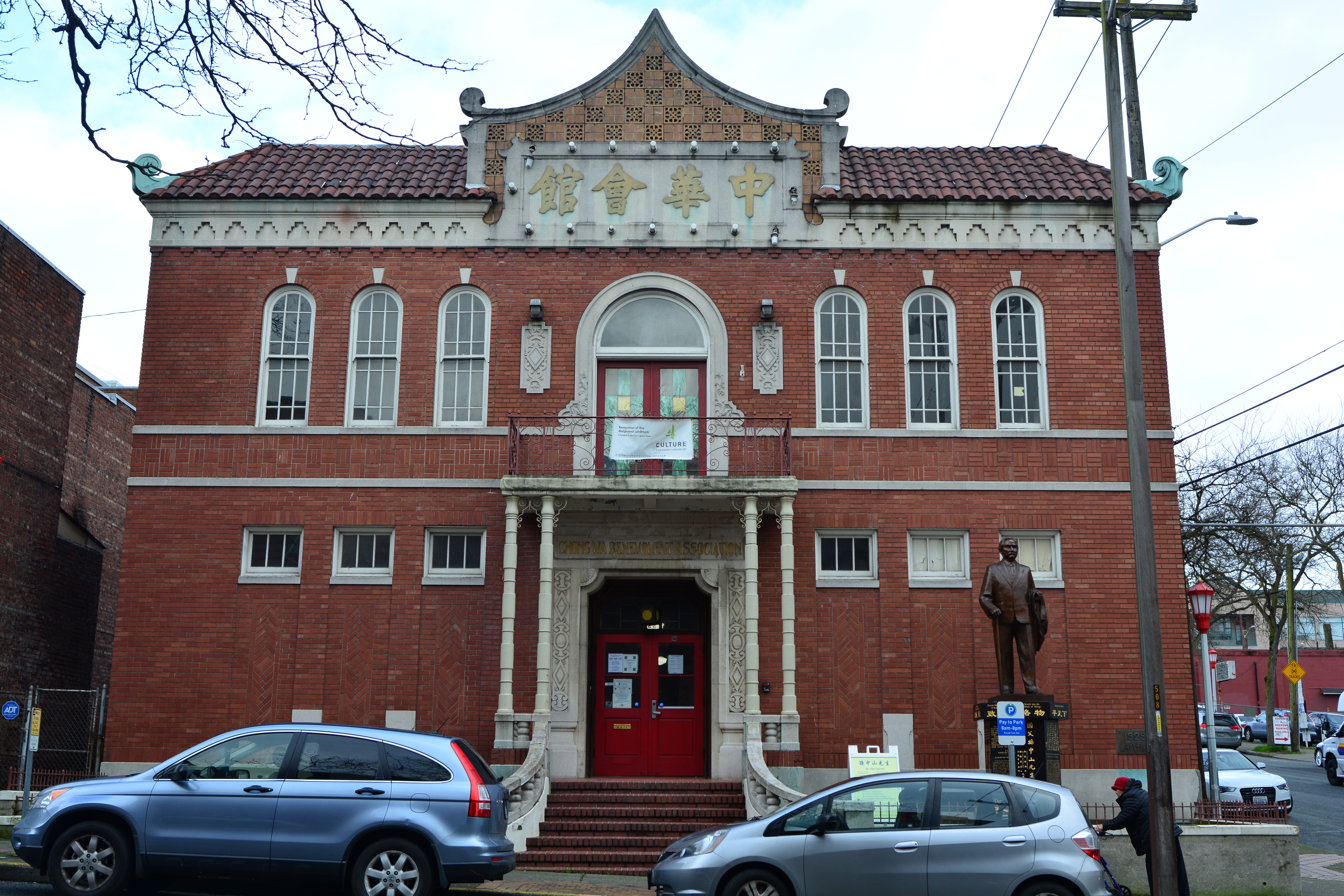
Chong Wa Benevolent Association, Seattle

The association has hosted language classes, Seattle Chinese Opera and Luck Ngi Music Club performances, and Seattle Chinese Community Girls Drill Team practices. The Chong Wa Education Society originally offered Cantonese classes, and it also offers Mandarin classes to children and adults. In 2018, the organization erected a statue of Sun Yat-sen outside its building. He had visited Seattle in 1911.

The association remains politically engaged and has recently spoken out against Sound Transit's proposal to build a Link light rail station on 5th Avenue in Chinatown-International District, pushing for a 4th Avenue alternative placement to decrease impacts on the community.

== Branches ==
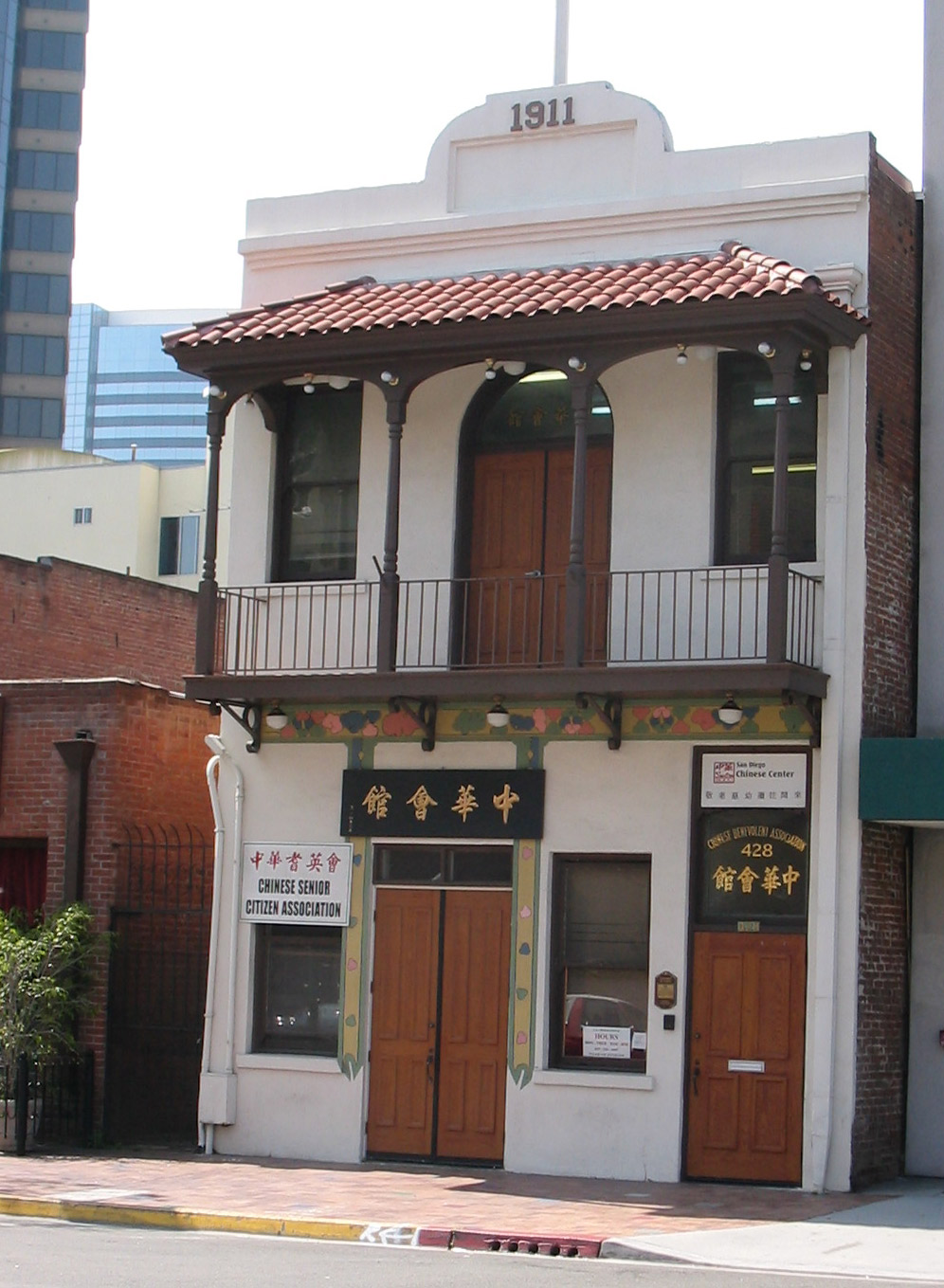
CCBA, San Diego

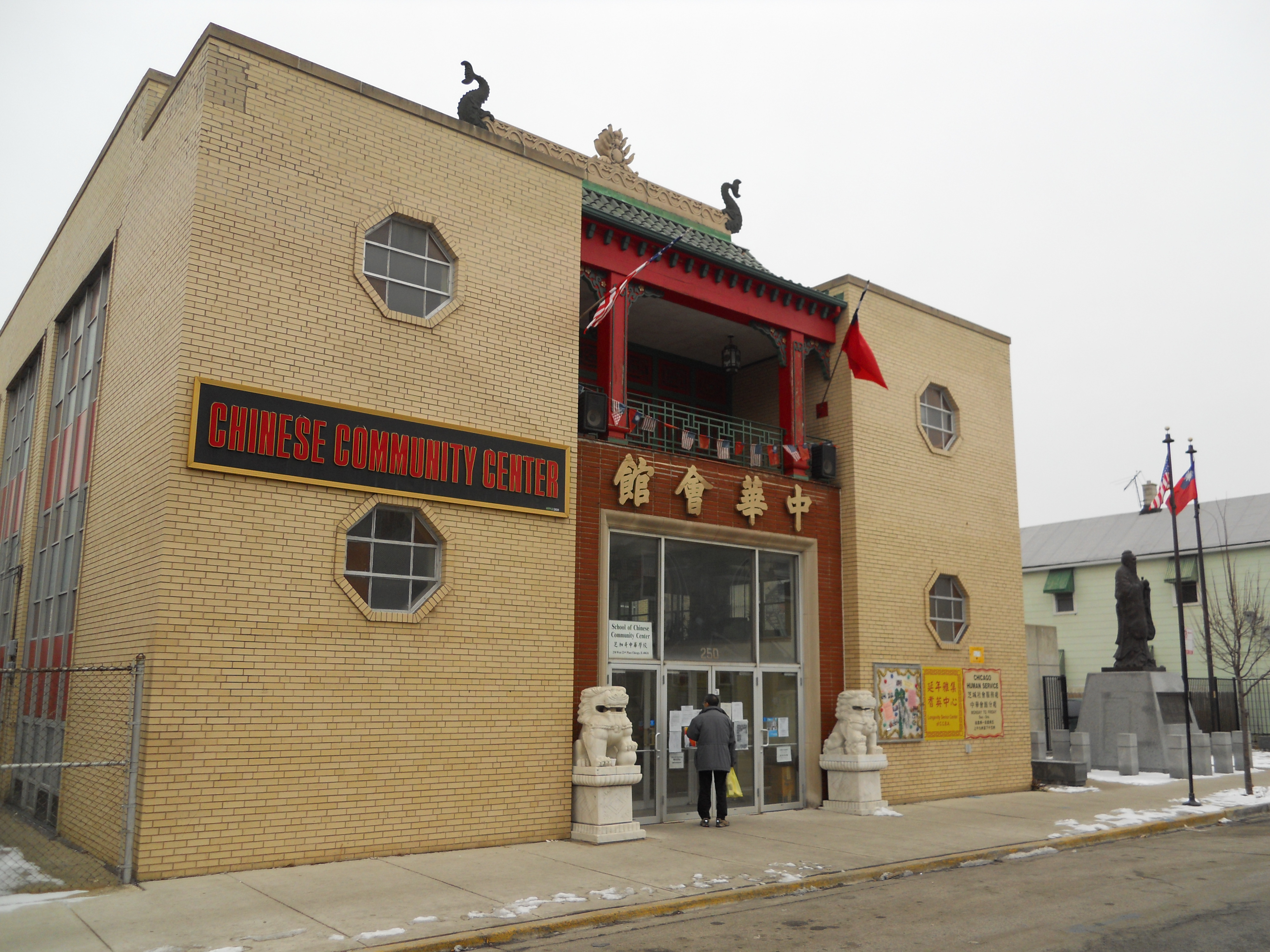
CCBA, Chicago

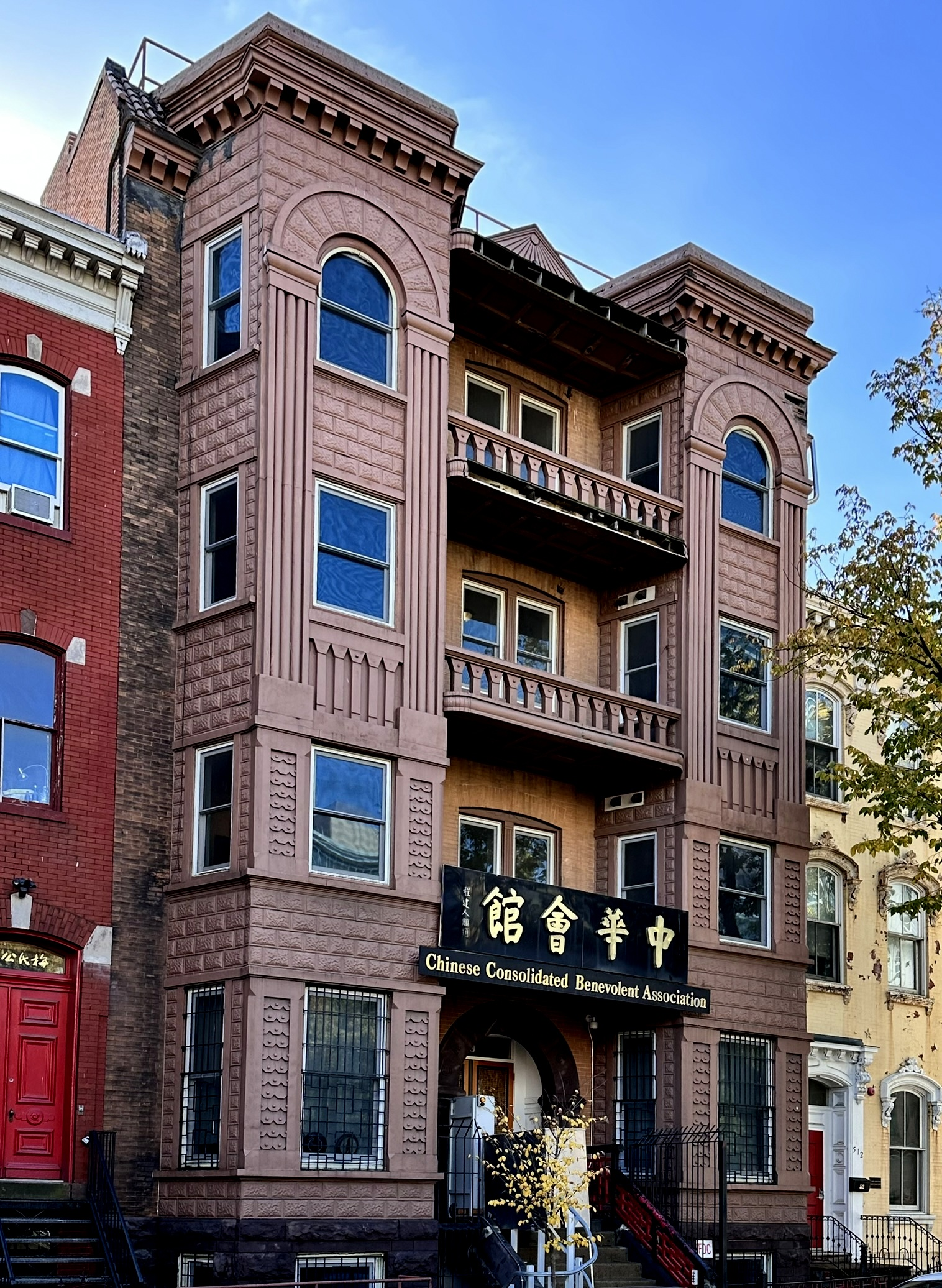
CCBA, Washington, D.C.

The CCBA has several branches in the United States and Canada, including:

- Augusta, Georgia
- Bakersfield, California
- Boston, Massachusetts
- Chicago, Illinois
- Cleveland, Ohio
- Detroit, Michigan
- Edmonton, Alberta
- Fresno, California
- Honolulu, Hawaii
- Houston, Texas
- Littleton, Colorado
- Los Angeles, California
- Marysville, California
- Montreal, Quebec
- New York City, New York
- Oakland, California
- Philadelphia, Pennsylvania
- Portland, Oregon
- Regina, Saskatchewan
- Sacramento, California
- Salinas, California
- San Diego, California
- San Francisco, California
- Seattle, Washington
- Stockton, California
- Toronto, Ontario
- Vancouver, British Columbia
- Victoria, British Columbia
- Washington, D.C.
- Windsor, Ontario

== See also ==
- Chinese Clan Association
- Kongsi
- List of Chinese American Associations
- Chinese Boycott of 1905
- Chinese Cemetery of Los Angeles
