= Wing Sam Chinn =

American architect (1897–1974)

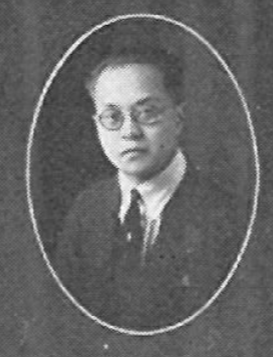
- Chinn in 1921
- Born: November 16, 1897; San Francisco, California, U.S.
- Died: December 27, 1974; Seattle, Washington, U.S.
- Education: University of Washington
- Occupation: Architect
- Years active: 1922–1963

Wing Sam Chinn (November 16, 1897 – December 27, 1974) was an American architect, noted as the first Asian-American architecture graduate in Washington state. Born to a Chinese immigrant family in San Francisco, he moved to Seattle at a young age. He received a bachelor's degree from the University of Washington in 1922 and began work as a draftsman for architect Andrew Willatsen. From 1927 to 1934, he worked with Thomas, Grainger & Thomas, where he was independently contracted to design the Chong Wa Benevolent Association Building despite lacking an architecture license. He obtained his license in 1935 and designed various residential and commercial buildings, mainly in the Seattle Chinatown. He worked for the Federal Housing Administration from 1939 until his retirement in 1963.

== Biography ==
On November 16, 1897, Wing Sam Chinn was born to Tai Hee and Cheung Shee Chinn, Chinese immigrants who had migrated to San Francisco. His parents, both working as restaurateurs, moved to Seattle in 1902, possibly so Tai Hee Chinn could be closer to his older brother or cousin, Gee Gow Chin. By 1910, Chinn lived in the Pioneer Square neighborhood alongside his elder brother Kum Shing and his wife. He attended primary school at the Central School in Downtown before attending Franklin High School, where he took college preparatory courses and played baseball. He graduated in 1916 and began attending the University of Washington the following year.

=== Career ===
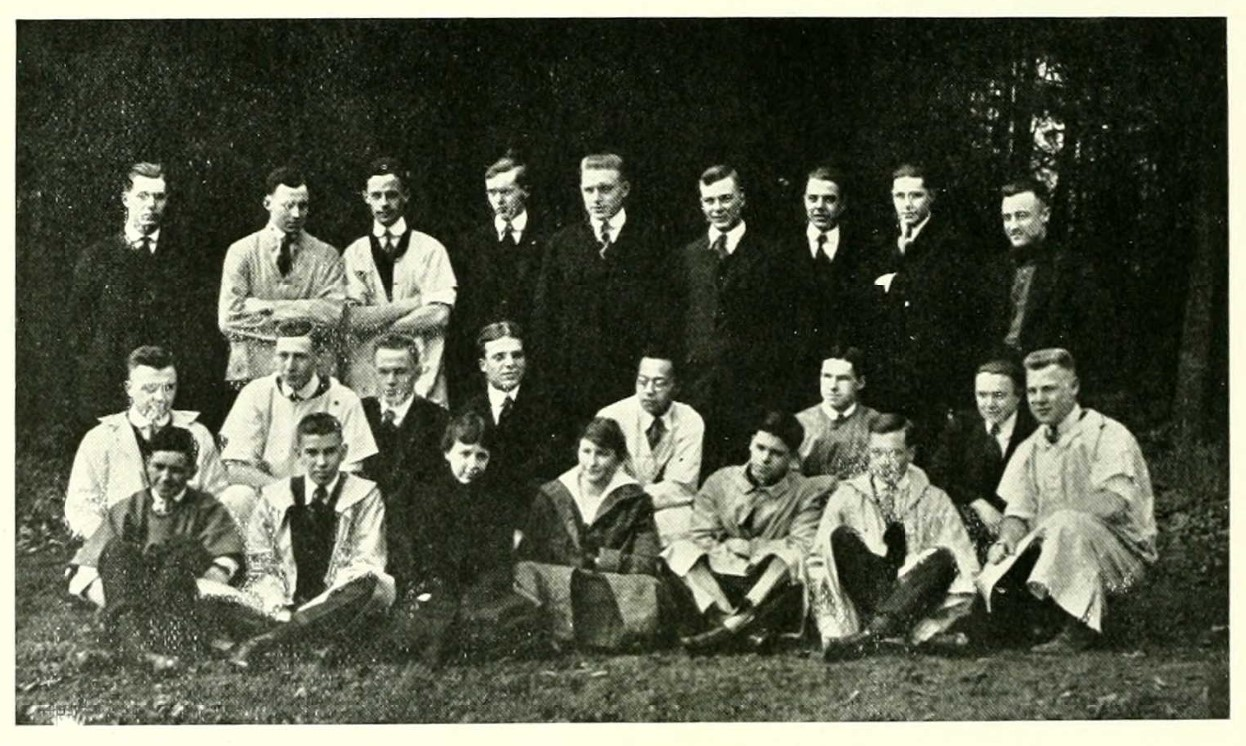
The University of Washington's Atelier Club in 1917. Chinn is the third from the right in the middle row.

At the University of Washington, Chinn was a member of the Chinese Students Club and the president of the Atelier, a student architectural club. He graduated with a Bachelor of Architecture in 1922. Soon after graduation, he was hired as a draftsman for Andrew Willatsen, himself a former draftsman for Frank Lloyd Wright. In 1924, while working under Willatsen, he designed the Chinese Grand Opera Theater. From 1927 to 1934, he worked with Thomas, Grainger & Thomas.

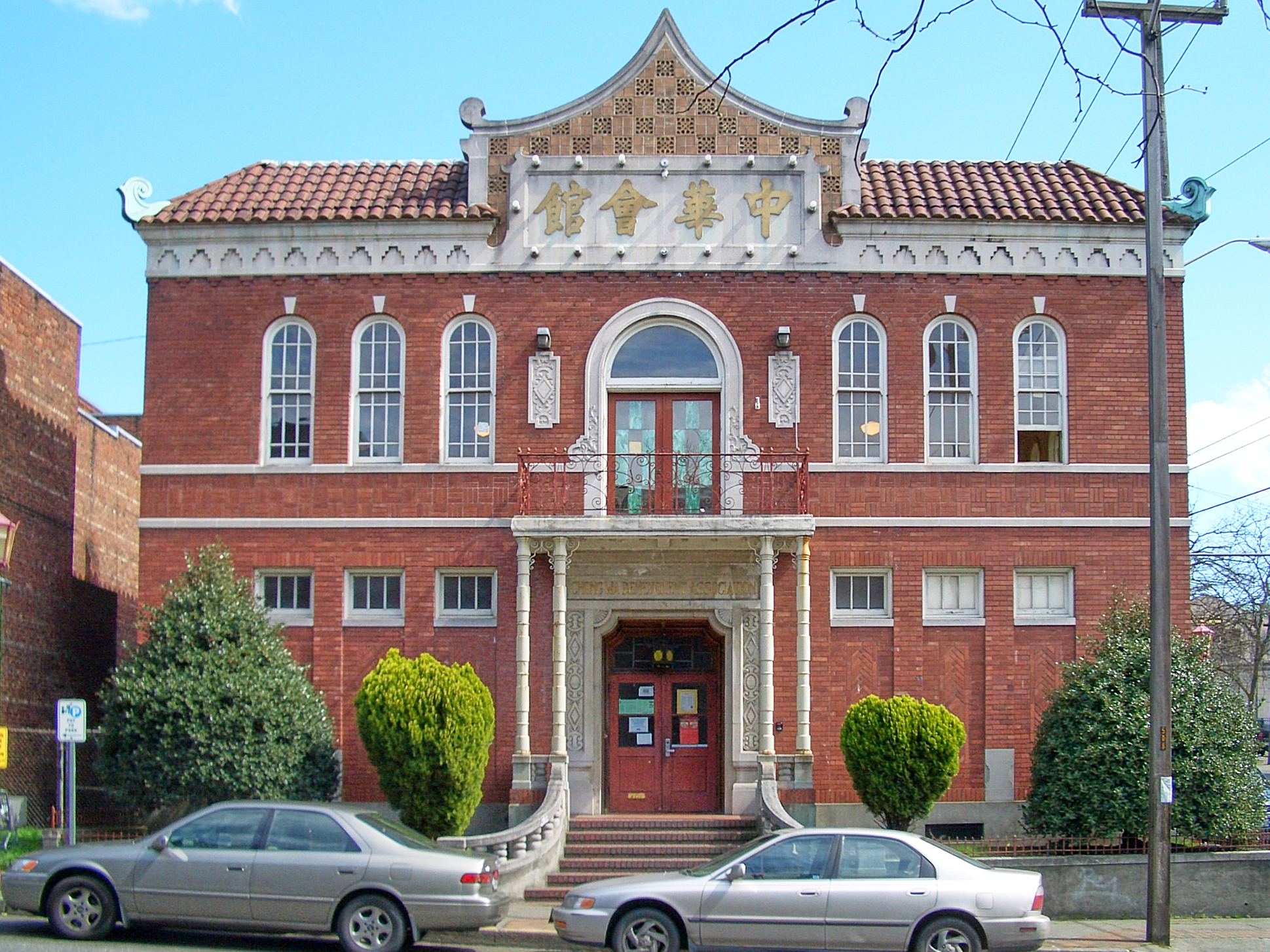
Chinn's Chong Wa Benevolent Association Building features both Western and Chinese design motifs.

In 1929–1930, he was independently contracted to design the Chong Wa Benevolent Association Building, a combination of Chinese and Beaux-Arts influences described by the Society of Architectural Historians as Chinn's most notable work. As Chinn had yet to receive an architecture license, the project's architect was officially recorded as Max A. Van House. During this period, he also made alterations to his previous Grand Opera Theater, transforming the building into a restaurant and nightclub.

In 1935, Chinn obtained an architecture license, began private practice, and was commissioned for alterations and private residences. He designed the Chinaland Restaurant on the Bothell-Everett Highway. From 1937 to 1938, he partnered with Frederick W. Bockerman at the firm Bockerman & Chinn, where he did significant alterations to the Gee How Oak Tin Building, including a recessed balcony and a mansard roof. Chinn's commissions were often for houses and businesses in Seattle Chinatown, usually with Chinese architectural inspiration.

After designing ten speculative houses for Carl Young Construction in Seattle in 1939–1940, Chinn was hired as an architect for the Seattle office of the Federal Housing Administration in 1939. He worked in various roles within the Seattle FHA, serving as the Assistant Chief Examiner, Assistant Chief Inspector, and Assistant Chief Architect over the late 1940s and 1950s. He was noted as a skilled administrator of construction methods and practices, contributing to the thousands of houses constructed by the local administration during his tenure. His last private architectural design was his own Seattle residence in 1946. He retired from the FHA in 1963, receiving honors from Federal Housing Administration Commissioner Phillip N. Brownstein. Chinn stated that he sought to spend his retirement painting in watercolor.

=== Personal life ===
Chinn married Margaret E. Chinn around 1929; they shared a surname before marriage and may have been cousins. He was a member of the Seattle Society of Architects, an alternative group to the American Institute of Architects. He died in Seattle on December 27, 1974.

== Works ==
Designs by Wing Sam Chinn
Name	Location	Date	Ref.
Chinese Grand Opera Theatre	Seattle	1924, 1929–1931	
Chong Wa Benevolent Association Building	Chinatown, Seattle	1929–1930	
Gee How Oak Tin Association Building (alterations)	Seattle	1936	
Arthur Wong Building	Seattle	1936–1937	
Josef H. Obzina House	Seattle	1937–1938	
Harry L. Jensen House	Seattle	1938–1939	
George E. Sheets House	Seattle	1939	
Carl Young Construction speculative houses (Ten total)	Seattle	1939–1940	
Sam & Margaret Chinn House	Seattle	1945–1946	
