= James Chin =

American epidemiologist

- Other name: Jim Chin
- Occupation: Former public health epidemiologist
- Known for: Professor emeritus at University of California, Berkeley; AIDS researcher

James (Jim) Chin was a public health epidemiologist. He worked in public health surveillance and prevention of communicable diseases, particularly AIDS, until 1992.

== Career ==
Chin was an international research fellow with the Hooper Foundation, UCSF Medical Center, San Francisco and the Institute for Medical Research, Kuala Lumpur, Malaysia, from 1961 to 1964, and a research epidemiologist at the California State Viral and Rickettsial Diseases Laboratory, Berkeley and Fort Ord, California from 1964 to 1967.

He served as head of the general epidemiology unit, Bureau of Communicable Disease Control, California State Department of Health Services, Berkeley, from 1968 to 1971 and was chief of their infectious disease section from 1971 to 1987.

He has studied the AIDS pandemic from the early 1980s in California, where he was responsible for surveillance and control of communicable diseases. In the late 1980s he was a consultant for the World Health Organization in Geneva, Switzerland, where he was responsible for developing the methods and guidelines for global and regional HIV/AIDS surveillance. He worked as chief of the surveillance, forecasting and impact assessment unit (SFI) of the Global Programme on AIDS, World Health Organization, Geneva, Switzerland from 1987 to 1992.

Since his resignation from WHO in 1992, he has worked as an independent consultant for different international agencies to evaluate the patterns and prevalence of HIV in developing countries, primarily in Africa and Asia. Some international agencies he has worked with include UNAIDS, WHO, Asian Development Bank, World Bank, USAID, and DFID.

He was a clinical professor of epidemiology at the School of Public Health, University of California at Berkeley, from 1992 until 2009 when he retired from active teaching.

== Controversies ==
In 2007 Chin released "The AIDS Pandemic: the collision of epidemiology with political correctness" regarding his accusation that the Joint United Nations Programme on HIV/AIDS had spread "[m]any myths and misconceptions" and a follow up in which he summarized his conclusion that "UNAIDS has ... grossly overestimated HIV prevalence (the number of persons living with an HIV infection); ... maintained, until about a year ago, that the AIDS pandemic was on a relentlessly increasing trajectory when it was actually decreasing over the past decade; and ... exaggerated the potential for HIV epidemics in “general” populations" and that "AIDS programs outside of sub-Saharan Africa ... wast[e] billions of dollars annually on programs directed to the general public, especially all youth, who outside of SSA are at, minimal to no risk, of epidemic HIV transmission". Children account for a disproportionate number of deaths from HIV and complications from AIDS.

His book cites Michael Fumento as a "accurate" source on prevalence of HIV cases amongst heterosexuals. By 2022, the majority of persons newly diagnosed HIV cases in the UK were heterosexual (45%). That same year, 22% of new HIV infections in the United States were in heterosexual persons. In the US, 19% of persons newly diagnosed with HIV were between 13 and 24.

In 2007 UNAIDS released a response to Chin's book saying "[t]he underlining theme of Dr Chin’s book is incorrect" and that "[e]stimates are not produced in isolation, but rather in close collaboration with world leading epidemiologists and national governments".

In 2009 an interview with Chin appeared in the AIDS denialfilm House of Numbers: Anatomy of an Epidemic. Chins name did not appear on the list of experts who called the films interview practices "deceptive", "perpetuat[ing] pseudo-science and myths", and "promot[ing] several notions that have no basis in science or the facts"..

In a 2018 paper in Applied Economics, Chin was cited by the author as saying the official prevalence of AIDS from UNAIDS was unreliable and often "sometimes deliberately" exaggerated.

== Memberships and board positions ==
During his public health career, Chin has held leadership positions at state, national, and international organizations and received recognition for his work as an infectious disease epidemiologist.

- Elected member, American Epidemiological Society (AES), 1973
- President, Conference of State and Territorial Epidemiologists (CSTE), 1977–1978
- Chairman, National Advisory Committee on Immunization Practices (ACIP), 1982–1985
- Member, Armed Forces Epidemiologic Board (AFEB), 1977–1983 and 1993–1998
- Member, Advisory Council for Public Health Preparedness (An Advisory Council to the Secretary of HHS, 2001–2004)

== Literary career ==
- Section editor (Communicable Diseases) for the 11th [1980] and 12th [1986] editions of Maxcy-Rosenau Public Health and Preventive Medicine (John Last, editor) Appleton-Century Crofts, New York
- Associate editor for the 14th (1985) and 15th (1990) edition of the American Public Health Association (APHA) Control of Communicable Diseases Manual (CCDM)
- Editor, 17th edition (2000) of the APHA's Control of Communicable Diseases Manual (CCDM).
- Author, The AIDS Pandemic: The Collision of Epidemiology with Political Correctness (January 2007, Radcliffe Publishing Ltd.)

== Awards ==
Chin was recipient of the "John Snow award in 1993 for career contributions to public health epidemiology from the American Public Health Association Epidemiology Section.
