= Francis Y. L. Chin =

Hong Kong scientist

Francis Yuk Lun Chin Chinese: 錢玉麟) is an emeritus professor at the University of Hong Kong after having retired as professor of computer science and Taikoo Professor of Engineering at the University of Hong Kong. Chin served as head of the Computer Science Department from its start until 1999. In 2018, he and his wife founded a start-up named DeepTranslate Limited currently based in the Hong Kong Science and Technology Parks. DeepTranslate provides AI-assisted machine translation services, mainly for financial documents.

== Academic career ==
Chin graduated from the University of Toronto in 1972 and received a doctorate from Princeton University in 1976. Before his appointment in Hong Kong, he held a variety of teaching positions in a number of universities in the US and Canada.

Chin was recruited to establish and head the Computer Science Department at the University of Hong Kong in 1985. He has served as Associate Dean for HKU Graduate School and Faculty of Engineering. He received the Best Teaching Award offered by HKU Student Union-80th Anniversary HKU in 1991, the Teaching Excellence Award, Dept of Computer Science, in 2000 and HKU Outstanding Researcher Award in 2010-11. He and his research team received the RECOMB 2022 Test of Time Award based on the IDBA genome assembly paper in 2012.

He is also the Managing Editor of the International Journal of the Foundations of Computer Science and is also a member of the editorial boards of a number of other journals.

In 1996, he was named a fellow of the IEEE.

== Government service ==
Chin was the project leader for a study commissioned by a Select Committee of the Legislative Council of Hong Kong into the cause of delays to the start of operation of the new Hong Kong International Airport at Chep La Kok. In 2001, he was seconded to act as the interim CEO of the Hong Kong Domain Name Registration Company.

He has also served on a range of Hong Kong government committees including:

- the Innovation and Technology Fund Vetting Committee;
- a variety of committees on research grants and university funding committees;
- the Hong Kong Council for Accreditation of Academic & Vocational Qualifications (HKCAAVQ);
- Hong Kong Deposit Protection Board;
- Chairman of the Process Review Committee, HKMA;
- Specialist Chief Judge, Judge Panel, Hong Kong ICT Awards;
- the Information Infrastructure Advisory Committee of the information Technology and Broadcasting Committee; and
- the Promotion and Monitoring Sub-committee of the Quality Education Fund.

== Research interests ==
Chin's interests include Bioinformatics, Computer Vision, the Design and Analysis of Algorithms

- Motif-finding software packages
- Security

== Publications ==
- Yu Peng, Henry C.M. Leung, Siu-Ming Yiu and Francis Y.L. Chin, “IDBA-UD: A de Novo Assembler for Single-Cell and Metagenomic Sequencing Data with Highly Uneven Depth”, Bioinformatics 2012, 28(11): 1420-1428 (June 2012)
- Henry Leung and Francis Chin, "Finding Exact Optimal Motif in Matrix Representation by Partitioning", Bioinformatics, 21(2): Proceedings of the 4th European Conference on Computational Biology (ECCB05), (Oct /Nov 2005).
- Henry Leung and Francis Y.L. Chin, "Generalized Planted (l,d)-Motif Problem with Negative Set", Proceedings of the 5th Workshop on Algorithms in Bioinformatics (WABI 2005), (October 2005)
- Francis Y.L. Chin and Henry C.M. Leung, "Voting Algorithms for Discovering Long Motifs", Proceedings of the Third Asia-Pacific Bioinformatics Conference (APBC2005), 261-271 (January 2005)
- Francis Y.L. Chin, Qiangfeng Zhang and Hong Shen, "k-Recombination Haplotype Inference in Pedigrees", Proceedings of the 2005 International Workshop on Bioinformatics Research and Applications (in ICCS 2005), 985-993,(May 22–25, 2005)
- Qiangfeng Zhang, Francis Y.L. Chin and Hong Shen, "Minimum Parent-Offspring Recombination Haplotype Inference in Pedigrees", LNCS Transactions on Computational Systems Biology (to appear)
- Francis Y.L. Chin, N.L. Ho, T.W. Lam, and Prudence W.H. Wong, "Efficient Constrained Multiple Sequence Alignment with Performance Guarantee", Journal of Bioinformatics and Computational Biology, 3(1):1-18 (February 2005) - preliminary version appeared in CSB2003
- F.Y.L. Chin, H.C.M. Leung, S.M.Yiu, T.W. Lam, R. Rosenfeld, W.W. Tsang, D.K. Smith, Y. Jiang, Finding Motifs for Insufficient Number of Sequences with Strong Binding to Transcription Factor, Proceedings of the 8th Annual International Conference on Research in Computational Molecular Biology (RECOMB 2004), Westin Hotel Horton Plaza, San Diego, CA USA, March 2004
- W.T. Chan, F.Y.L. Chin, and H.F. Ting, Escaping a Grid by Edge-Disjoint Paths, Algorithmica 36:343-359, April 2003. Also appeared in the Proceedings of the Eleventh Annual ACM-SIAM Symposium on Discrete Algorithms (SODA'00), San Francisco, USA, January 2000
- F.Y.L. Chin and S.P.Y. Fung, Online Scheduling with Partial Job Values: Does Timesharing or Randomization Help?, Algorithmica, 37:149-164, August 2003
- F.Y.L. Chin and S.P.Y. Fung, Improved competitiveness algorithms for online scheduling with partial job values, The Ninth International Computing and Combinatorics Conference (COCOON 2003), Big Sky, MT, USA, pp. 425–434, July 2003
