= Annping Chin =

Taiwan-born American historian and sinologist (born 1950)

Annping Chin (Chinese: 金安平; pinyin: Jīn Ānpíng; born 1950 in Taiwan) is an American historian and sinologist. She is a senior lecturer of history at Yale. Her fields of study include Confucianism, Taoism, and the Chinese intellectual tradition. Before Yale, she was on the faculty at Wesleyan University.

Chin studied mathematics at Michigan State University and received her Ph.D. in Chinese thought from Columbia University. She lives in West Haven, Connecticut, with her husband Jonathan Spence until his death in 2021. She has two children, writer Mei Chin and video game designer Yar Woo.

Chin was born in Taiwan in 1950 to a Manchu family from Liaoning. In 1962, she and her family moved to the United States and have lived there ever since.

== Publications ==
Chin has written or translated six books:

- The Analects (Penguin Classics, 2014), a new translation and commentary on the Analects of Confucius ISBN 9780143106852
- Confucius: A Life of Thought and Politics (Yale University Press, 2009) ISBN 9780300151183
  - Konfuzius - Geschichte seines Lebens (2010) ISBN 9783458710233
  - Confucius: Un sage en politique (2010) ISBN 9782020990578
- The Authentic Confucius: A Life of Thought and Politics (Scribner, 2007) ISBN 9780743246187
  - Autentico Confucio, O: Uma Vida de Pensamento e Politica (2008) ISBN 9788585985219
- Four Sisters of Hofei (Scribner, 2002), a history of China's last century through the lives of four highly educated and accomplished sisters including Chang Ch'ung-ho ()
  - Die Schwestern von Hofei (2004) ISBN 9783442152858
- Tai Chen on Mencius (Yale University Press, 1990), a study of eighteenth-century Chinese intellectual history
- Children of China: Voices from Recent Years (Knopf, 1989), based on interviews with Chinese children living in the People's Republic of China ISBN 9780394571164
- with Jonathan Spence, Chinese Century: A Photographic History of the Last Hundred Years (Random House, 1996).
