= Max Oidtmann =

American historian

Max Gordon Oidtmann (born 1979) is an American historian of Late Imperial China (1368–1912) and Inner Asia (Islamic Central Asia, Tibet, Mongolia, and Manchuria). He also has interest in modern China and the affairs of Chinese ethnic minorities. He was an assistant professor at Georgetown University in Qatar from 2013 to 2021. Oidtmann is currently a professor at the Institute for Sinology at LMU Munich in Germany

== Education ==
He earned a B.A. in History (with concentration in East Asian Studies) at Carleton College in 2001 and a M.A. degree in East Asian Regional Studies at Harvard University. In March 2014, Oidtmann received his Ph.D. in History and East Asian Languages from Harvard University.

== Academic position ==
He previously taught Asian History as well as specialized courses on the History of China, Islam and Muslims in East Asia, Tibet, and comparative studies of empire and colonialism at Georgetown University's School of Foreign Service campus in Doha, Qatar, from 2013 to 2021.

== Fields of research ==
Max Oidtmann works with historical materials in Chinese, Tibetan, Uyghur, Manchu and Japanese languages.

Oidtmann's book Forging the Golden Urn: Qing Empire and the Politics of Reincarnation in Tibet, 1792-1911 (2018) is a political history of reincarnation in China and Tibet from the late 1700s through the present.

== Publication list ==
Ph.D thesis

- Between Patron and Priest: Amdo Tibet Under Qing Rule, 1792-1911, Harvard University, 2014, ProQuest (Abstract)

Peer-reviewed articles

- Qing Colonial Legal Culture in Amdo Tibet (original title: A Document from the Xunhua Archives, International Society for Chinese Law & History — 中國法律与歷史國際學會, volume 1, Number 1, November 2014
- Imperial Legacies and Revolutionary Legends: The Sibe Cavalry Company, the Eastern Turkestan Republic, and Historical Memories in Xinjiang, Saksaha: A Journal of Manchu Studies, volume 21, 2014, pages 49–87
- A “Dog-eat-dog” World: Qing Jurispractices and the Legal Inscription of Piety in Amdo, Extrême-Orient Extrême-Occident, Issue 40, 2016, pages 151–182, doi:10.4000/extremeorient.620
- Overlapping Empires: Religion, Politics, and Ethnicity in Nineteenth-Century Qinghai, Late Imperial China, Volume 37, Number 2, December 2016, pages 41–91

Book chapters

- (With Yang Hongwei), A Study of Qing Dynasty "Xiejia" Rest Houses in Xunhua Subprefecture, Gansu, in Muslims in Amdo Tibetan Society: Multidisciplinary Approaches, Marie-Paule Hille, Bianca Horlemann, Paul K. Nietupski, eds., Lexington Books, 2015, 354 pages, pages 21–46
- A Case for Gelukpa Governance: The Historians of Labrang, Amdo, and the Manchu Rulers of China, in Greater Tibet. An Examination of Borders, Ethnic Boundaries, and Cultural Areas, P. Christiaan Klieger ed., Rowman & Littlefield, 2015, 178 pages, pages 111–148

Books

- Forging the Golden Urn: The Qing Empire and the Politics of Reincarnation in Tibet, Columbia University Press, 2018, 352 p. doi:10.7312/oidt18406 ISBN 9780231545303 (WEAI Author Q&A: Max Oidtmann's "Forging the Golden Urn", by Ross Yelsey, August 6, 2018)

Reviews

- Review of The Prophet and the Party: Shari’a and Sectarianism in China’s Little Mecca, by Matthew Erie, Dissertation Reviews, October 7, 2014
