= Kathy L. Chinn =

American politician

Kathy L. Chinn is a farmer and rancher from Clarence, Missouri who also serves as a Republican member of the Missouri House of Representatives. She is married, and she and her husband Gary have been farmers and ranchers for 33 years. They have two children, Kevin and Kyle. She is an alumna of Missouri's Agricultural Leadership of Tomorrow (ALOT) program, serves on the Greenley Research Center Advisory Board and the American Veterinary Medical Association Task Force, and has been active in a number of pork producer and farm bureau committees. She was first elected to the Missouri House of Representatives in 2004, but in 2006 was defeated for re-election by Democrat Tom Shively of Shelbyville, whom she defeated for her only term in the house.
