= Jonathan D. Spence =

English-born American historian (1936–2021)

Jonathan D. Spence CMG
- Born: 11 August 1936; Surrey, England
- Died: 25 December 2021 (aged 85); West Haven, Connecticut, U.S.
- Education: Clare College, Cambridge (MA); Yale University (PhD)
- Spouse: Annping Chin
- Scientific career
- Fields: Sinology
- Institutions: Yale University
- Doctoral advisor: Mary C. Wright
- Other academic advisors: Fang Chao-ying (房兆楹)
- Doctoral students: Sherman Cochran, Robert Oxnam Pamela Kyle Crossley, Kenneth Pomeranz, Joanna Waley-Cohen, Mark C. Elliott
- Jonathan Spence's voice Recorded June 2008 from the BBC Radio 4 programme the Reith Lectures

Chinese name
- Traditional Chinese: 史景遷
- Simplified Chinese: 史景迁
Transcriptions
Standard Mandarin
- Hanyu Pinyin: Shǐ Jǐngqiān

Jonathan Dermot Spence CMG (Chinese: 史景遷; pinyin: Shǐ Jǐngqiān; 11 August 1936 – 25 December 2021) was a British-American sinologist and historian who specialised in Chinese history. He was Sterling Professor of History at Yale University from 1993 to 2008. He was best known for his book The Search for Modern China (1990), a survey of the last several hundred years of Chinese history. He published over a dozen books on China. Spence's major interest was modern China, especially the Qing dynasty, and relations between China and the West. Spence frequently used biographies to examine cultural and political history.

== Early life and education ==
Spence was born on 11 August 1936 to Muriel (née Crailsham) and Dermot Spence in Surrey in England. His mother was a French researcher while his father worked at an art gallery and a publishing house.

Spence was educated at Winchester College until 1954. He then spent two years in the British Army and was deployed to Germany. He read history at Clare College, Cambridge, and received his B.A. in 1959. While at Cambridge, he was the editor of the campus magazine and was also the co-editor of British literary magazine Granta. After graduation, he won a Mellon Fellowship to study Chinese history and culture at Yale University, where he won the John Addison Porter Prize in 1965. He earned an M.A. in Chinese from Yale and his Ph.D. in Chinese from Yale in 1965. As part of his graduate training, he spent a year in Australia studying under Chinese scholars Fang Chao-ying and Tu Lien-che.

== Academic career ==
Spence taught a popular undergraduate course at Yale University on the history of modern China, which formed the basis for his book The Search for Modern China (1990). He taught at Yale for more than 40 years. During this time he wrote many books on China that furthered the understanding of the country and its culture with Western audiences. Some of his books during this period included The Search for Modern China (1990), which was published on the back of the Tiananmen Square massacre in 1989, and God's Chinese Son: The Taiping Heavenly Kingdom of Hong Xiuquan (1996).

Spence was president of the American Historical Association between 2004 and 2005. While his primary focus was on Qing dynasty China, he also wrote a biography of Mao Zedong and The Gate of Heavenly Peace, a study of twentieth-century intellectuals and their relation to revolution. He retired from Yale in 2008.

His book The Search for Modern China was a New York Times best seller and documented the evolution of China starting from the decline of the Ming dynasty in the early 17th century to the pro-democracy movement of 1989, while his book Treason by the Book (2001) documented the story of a scholar who took on the third Manchu Emperor in the 1700s.

=== Honors ===
Spence received eight honorary degrees in the United States as well as from the Chinese University of Hong Kong, and (in 2003) from Oxford University. He was invited to become a visiting professor at Peking University and an honorary professor at Nanjing University. He was named Companion of the Order of St Michael and St George in 2001, and in 2006, he was elected an Honorary Fellow of Clare College, Cambridge.

He received the William C. DeVane Medal of the Yale Chapter of Phi Beta Kappa (1952); a Guggenheim Fellowship (1979); the Los Angeles Times History Prize (1982), and the Vursel Prize of the American Academy and Institute of Arts and Letters (1983). He was elected to the American Academy of Arts and Sciences (1985), named a MacArthur Fellow (1988), appointed to the Council of Scholars of the Library of Congress (1988), elected a member of the American Philosophical Society (1993), and named a corresponding fellow of the British Academy (1997).

In May and June 2008, he gave the 60th anniversary Reith Lectures, which were broadcast on BBC Radio 4.

In 2010, Spence was appointed to deliver the annual Jefferson Lecture at the Library of Congress, the US federal government's highest honour for achievement in the humanities.

== Personal life ==
Spence's name in Chinese, 史景遷 (pinyin: Shǐ Jǐngqiān), was given to him by Fang Chao-ying to reflect his love of history and admiration for the Han dynasty historian Sima Qian. He chose the surname 史 (Shǐ; literally "history") and personal name 景遷 (Jǐngqiān), where 景 (jǐng) means admire (as in 景仰) and 遷 (qiān) was taken from the personal name of Sima Qian (司馬遷). Spence became a U.S. citizen in 2000.

Spence's wife Annping Chin was a senior lecturer in history at Yale with a PhD in Chinese thought from Columbia. He had two sons from a previous marriage (1962–1993) to Helen Alexander, Colin and Ian Spence, two stepchildren, Yar Woo and Mei Chin, a grandchild as well as two step-grandchildren. Spence died from complications of Parkinson's disease on 25 December 2021, at the age of 85 at his residence in West Haven, Connecticut.

== Bibliography ==
=== Books ===
- Tsʻao Yin and the Kʻang-hsi Emperor: bondservant and master (New Haven: Yale, 1966)
- To Change China: Western Advisers in China, 1620–1960 (Boston: Little Brown, 1969).
- Emperor of China: Self-Portrait of K'ang-Hsi (New York: Knopf, 1974)
- The Death of Woman Wang (New York: Penguin, 1978). Story situated in 17th century Tancheng. ISBN 014005121X
- Imperial China: Photographs 1850-1912 (New York: Pennwick Publishing Inc., 1978). Co-authored with Clark Worswick, foreword by Harrison Salisbury.
- The Gate of Heavenly Peace: The Chinese and Their Revolution 1895–1980 (Cambridge: Cambridge University Press, 1982)
- The Memory Palace of Matteo Ricci (New York: Penguin, 1984)
- The Question of Hu (New York: Knopf, 1987) ISBN 978-0-394-57190-4). Biography of John Hu 胡若望, 18th-century Chinese who went to France with Jean-François Foucquet.
- The Search for Modern China (1990; 2nd edition, 1999; 3rd edition 2013)
- Chinese Roundabout: Essays on History and Culture (New York: Norton, 1992)
- God's Chinese Son (New York: Norton, 1996) ISBN 978-0-393-03844-6. Biography of Hong Xiuquan, leader of Taiping Rebellion.
- (with Annping Chin): Chinese Century: A Photographic History of the Last Hundred Years (Random House, 1996)
- The Chan's Great Continent: China in Western Minds (New York: Norton, 1998)
- Mao Zedong. Penguin Lives. New York: Viking Press. 1999. ISBN 978-0-670-88669-2. OCLC 41641238.
  - John F. Burns (6 February 2000). "Methods of the Great Leader". The New York Times.
- Treason by the Book (2001) ISBN 0-14-102779-7
- Return to Dragon Mountain: Memories of a Late Ming Man (2007) Viking, 332 pages. ISBN 978-0-670-06357-4

=== Book reviews ===
- "The Dream of Catholic China" The New York Review of Books 54/11 (28 June 2007): 22–24 [reviews Liam Matthew Brockey, Journey to the East: the Jesuit Mission to China, 1579–1724]
