= Esther Applunius =

Malaysian singer

- Born: Elizabeth Applunius; 12 April 1987 (age 39); Sabah, Malaysia
- Occupation: Singer / Songwriter
- Instrument: Voice
- Years active: 1998s – present

Elizabeth Applunius (born 12 April 1987), also known as Esther Applunius or Esther OIAM, is a Malaysian singer-songwriter.

Originally from Tambunan, Sabah in Malaysia, she has been in the entertainment industry since she was 9 years old.

== Career ==
At the age of 10, Applunius was Sabah champion in the RTM singing contest Bintang Kecil. In 2009, she reached the final of the Malaysian TV reality show One in a Million and many expected her to win. However, she gained second place after Shah Indrawan Ismail. In 2016, she won the first prize of RM39,999 in the Star Search 999 Singing Competition, an event organised by the Sabah-Labuan Motion Picture Traders and Entertainment Association (Slamptea).

Apart from her television appearances in One in a Million, Esther has entered and won many singing competitions since she started performing in 1998, including the 2005 Sugandoi Kaamatan singing contest, and the 2008 PERTISA Award for the most popular singer in Sabah in the women's category.

She has also been a member of several bands, including D'Illusions, and has performed in a number of venues in Kota Kinabalu, the state capital of Sabah.

=== Recordings ===
- 2005 - Esther Applunius Vol. 1 (Album)
- 2009 - Menggapai mimpi (Single)
- 2010 - Selalu (Album)
- 2011 - Catch me
- 2013 - Sipi - Sipi (Single)
- 2014 - Aku (Single)
- 2016 - 1 Dalam 2 (Single)
- 2017 - If only you knew (Single)
- 2020 - ALFIAN (Single)
- 2024 - Suba sayau belama (Single)
- 2025 - Dulu suka sayang (Single)

=== One in a Million (OIAM) ===
In December 2008, Esther auditioned for the third season of the reality TV singing competition One in a Million on 8TV, and reached the final of the competition. The following shows her progress through the competition:

==== Performances and results ====
Week #/Date	Song choice	Original artist	Result
1st Week – 20 February 2009	Better in Time	Leona Lewis	Immunity/Top 12
2nd Week – 27 February 2009	Mengenangmu	Kerispatih	Top 11
3rd Week – 6 March 2009	I Try	Macy Gray	Top 10
4th Week – 13 March 2009	Dialah Di Hati	Datuk Siti Nurhaliza	Top 9
5th Week – 20 March 2009	Won't Go Home Without You	Maroon 5	Immunity/Top 8
6th Week – 27 March 2009	I Don't Love You	My Chemical Romance	Top 7
7th Week – 30 April 2009	Sweet About Me	Gabriella Cilmi	Top 6
8th Week – 10 April 2009	Legenda	Datuk Sheila Majid	Top 5
9th Week – 17 April 2009	One Night Only; Keeps Gettin' Better; Semua Jadi Satu	Jennifer Hudson; Christina Aguilera; 3 Diva	Top 4
Semi-final – 24 April 2009	Better in Time; Won't Go Home Without You	Leona Lewis; Maroon 5	Top 3
Grand Finals – 1 May 2009	Mengapai Mimpi; Please don't stop the Music	Esther Applunius; Rihanna	1st runner up

=== Anugerah Juara Carta Lagu Artis Sabah RTM ===
In March 2011 she was the winner of the "Anugerah Juara Carta Lagu Artis Sabah" competition for her performance of the newly released song Selalu (Always), taken from her second album. The competition, organised by Sabah Radio Television Malaysia, encourages performers not only to sing, but also to write their own songs; the winning song Selalu is Esther's first major success in musical composition.

=== Anugerah Juara Carta Lagu Artis Sabah RTM ===
7 March 2020. She again won the "Anugerah Juara Carta Lagu Artis Sabah" competition season 13 for her own song composition ALFIAN, she got champion, the best vocal, and longest Running Song No.1 in Sabah FM, 42 Weeks.

=== Tournament/Championships ===
- 1998 - RTM Bintang Kecil State & National, Kuching Sarawak (Champion)
- 2005 - KDCA Sugandoi Kaamatan State Singing Competition (Champion)
- 2009 - One In A Million Reality TV 8, Season 3 (1st Runner Up)
- 2011 - RTM Anugerah Carta Lagu Artis Sabah, Season 4 (Champion & Best Vocal Award)
- 2013 - RTM Anugerah Carta Lagu Popular Kadazan, Season 4 (1st Runner Up & Best Performance Award)
- 2014 - RTM Anugerah Carta Lagu Artis Sabah, Season 4 (Longest Running Song No.1 in Sabah FM)
- 2016 - “The Esther’s Band”, Hard Rock Rising Battle Of The Band, Kk (Champion)
- 2016 - Star Search 999, The Biggest Chinese Singing Competition Rm39,999, KK(Champion)
- 2017 - Malaysia Championships Of Performing Arts, Kuala Lumpur (Gold Medal)
- 2017 - World Championships Of Performing Arts, Los Angeles, USA (Gold Medal)
- 2020 - RTM Anugerah Carta Lagu Artis Sabah, Season 4 (Champion, Best Vocal Award, Longest Running Song No.1 in Sabah FM, 42 Weeks)
- 2024 - One In A Million Reality TV 3, Season 4 (Top 20)

=== Awards ===
- 2008 - PERTISA Award (Recipient Most Popular Female Singer)
- 2009 - PARAS Award (Nominess For Most Popular Female Singer)
- 2015 - Sabah Artistes Award (Recipient Jasamu Dikenang)
- 2015 - Malam Seribu Bintang P.175 Papar (Recipient Jasamu Dikenang)
- 2016 - KDCA Huguan Siou Award (Recipient Most Popular Kadazan Female Artist)
- 2019 - KDCA Huguan Siou Award (Recipient Most Outstanding Achievement Artist)
- 2022 - 100 Wanita Sumber Inspirasi Sabah 2020/2021
- 2023 - Pingat Perkhidmatan Terbaik (PPT), TYT
