= Mei Chin =

Irish writer (born 1977)

Mei Chin (born 1977) is a fiction and food writer living in Dublin.

Her short stories have appeared in Fiction and Bomb magazines and are characterized by a combination of the fantastic and the mundane.

In the late 1990s she was an editor at Vogue, and she has written reviews and essays for Gourmet, Vogue, Mirabella, The New York Times Book Review, Irish Times, Sunday Times, Irish Independent, and other publications. She is also the author of a number of books of literary criticism for Chelsea House Publishers, and she has taught food writing at Yale University. Her essays have been anthologized in Best Food Writing 2004, 2006, and 2012. Since 2020 she has co-hosted a food podcast called Spice Bags, and with her co-hosts she published the book Soup in 2023.

She is a native of Connecticut and a graduate of Hopkins School and Wesleyan University. Her mother, Professor Annping Chin teaches at Yale, and her late stepfather, Professor Jonathan Spence, taught there until he retired in 2008.

== Awards ==
She won the James Beard Foundation's M. F. K. Fisher Distinguished Writing Award in 2005 for "Eat Drink Mother Daughter," (a long article published in Saveur) and won two IACP Food Journalism Awards, in 2010 for her Saveur article "The Art of Kimchi" and in 2013 for her Gilt Taste article "Rhubarb's Ruby Submission." In 2021 she won the Best Food Podcast Award at the Irish Food Writing Awards.
