= Chin Liew Ten =

Singaporean philosopher

Chin Liew Ten FAHA FASSA, also known as C. L. Ten, is an Australian philosopher. He is an emeritus professor of Philosophy and former head of the Philosophy Department at the National University of Singapore. Before that, he was professor of Philosophy (personal chair) and acting head of the School of Philosophy, Linguistics, and Bioethics at Monash University, Australia.

== Biography ==
Chin was born in Malaysia, and is a graduate of the former University of Malaya (now National University of Singapore) in Singapore and of the London School of Economics. He was elected a fellow of the Australian Academy of the Humanities in 1989, and a fellow of the Academy of Social Sciences in Australia in 2000.

He is on the editorial boards of several journals, including Australasian Journal of Philosophy, Utilitas, Journal of Political Philosophy, Bioethics and the Journal of Moral Philosophy.

== Works ==
- Mill on Liberty (Clarendon Press: Oxford 1980)
- Crime, Guilt, and Punishment (Clarendon Press: Oxford 1987)
- The Nineteenth Century (editor) (Routledge: London 1994)
- Mill's Moral, Political, and Legal Philosophy (Ashgate: Aldershot 1999)
- Was Mill a Liberal? (Marshall Cavendish: Singapore 2004)
- Theories of Rights (Ashgate: Aldershot 2006)
