= Beatrice Bartlett =

American historian of modern Chinese history (1928–2024)

Beatrice Sturgis Bartlett (October 4, 1928 – April 1, 2024), also known as Betsy Bartlett, was an American historian of modern Chinese history, from the 1600s to the modern era. She was Professor Emeritus of History at Yale University.

== Biography ==
Bartlett received her B.A. from Smith College and Ph.D. (1980) from Yale University. She is best known for her work on Monarchs and Ministers: The Grand Council in Mid-Ch'ing China, 1723-1820 (1991), a significant expansion of her PhD dissertation, which has been described as the "best contribution to Ch'ing institutional history in any language." After teaching at Yale for a number of years, Bartlett retired in 2005 as a full professor, and became Professor Emerita of History.

Bartlett came from a long line of Yale alumni, including being related to the first Chinese to graduate from a North American university, the Yale alumnus Yung Wing. She died on April 1, 2024, at the age of 95.

== Selected works ==
- Monarchs and ministers : the Grand Council in Mid-Chʻing China, 1723-1820, 1991
- Ch'ing documents in the National Palace Museum Archives by Beatrice S Bartlett, 1974
- Jun zhu yu da chen : Qing zhong qi de jun ji chu (1723-1820), 2017
- The secret memorials of the Yung-Cheng period (1723-1735) : archival and published versions, 1974
- The vermilion brush : the Grand Council communications system and central government decision making in mid Chʻing China, 1980
- Archive materials in China on United States history, 1985
- Imperial notations on Chʻing official documents in the Chʻien-Lung (1736-1795) and Chia-Chʻing (1796-1820) reigns, 1972
