= Lin Sing Association =

Chinese American organization

The Lin Sing Association (Chinese: 聯成公所; Jyutping: lyun4 sing4 gung1 so2) is a Chinese American organization. The goals of the association are to improve the rights and welfare of its members.

Like many Overseas Chinese associations, the Lin Sing Association continues to fly the flag of the Republic of China alongside the U.S. flag, and recognizes it as the legitimate Chinese government as opposed to the People's Republic of China.

== History ==
The Lin Sing Association was established in 1900. Initially, the association rented the top floor of 13 Pell Street, Chinatown, New York as their headquarters. On June 26, 1925, after raising over 70,000 dollars, the association purchased 45-49 Mott Street and moved its headquarters to its current location in 47-49 Mott Street.

== Members ==
The Lin Sing Association is made up of 18 separate organizations. They are:

- Hok Shan Society 鶴山公所
- Tsung Tsin Association 崇正會
- Chung Shan Association 中山同鄉會
- Tung On Association 東安公所
- Yee Shan Benevolent Society 番禺同鄉會
- Nam Shum Association 南順同鄉會
- Sun Wei Association 美國新會同鄉會
- Fay Chaw Merchants Association 惠州工商會
- Hai Nan Association 海南同鄉會
- Hoy Ping Association 開平同鄉會
- Tai Pun Yook Ying Association 大鵬育英社
- Fukien American Association 福建同鄉會
- Sam Kiang Charitable Association 三江公所
- Sze Kong Association 師公工商會
- Tai Look Merchants Association 太陸總商會
- Wah Pei Association 華北同鄉會
- Yan Ping Association 恩平同鄉會
