= Censorship in Hong Kong =

Censorship in Hong Kong is the suppression of speech or other public communication, which is a practice that can infringe upon freedom of speech. By law, censorship is usually practised against the distribution of certain materials, particularly child pornography, obscene images, sedition, separatism, state secrets, and reports on court cases which may lead to unfair trial.

At the time of the transfer of sovereignty over Hong Kong in 1997, Hong Kong boasted one of the highest degrees of press freedom in Asia. However, press censorship had a long history in the British colony and was only abolished in 1987 with the handover in sight. Since the handover to China, Hong Kong has been granted relative legal, economic, and political autonomy under the one country, two systems policy. Hong Kong's freedom of speech, of the press, and of publication are protected under Article 27 of the Hong Kong Basic Law and Article 16 of the Hong Kong Bill of Rights.

Observers have noted a trend of decreasing press freedom in the territory, including physical attacks on journalists, acts targeted at liberal media and against their owners, withdrawal of advertising revenues, and appointment of compliant pro-Beijing chief editors. The decline in Hong Kong's ranking on the Press Freedom Index published annually by Reporters Without Borders has been vertiginous. It stood at 148th in 2022, a drop of 68 places from the year prior, having ranked 71st in 2015. As of 2025, Hong Kong ranked 140th on the index.

In 2020, under the Hong Kong national security law enacted by Beijing's National People's Congress, it was made illegal to incite hatred against the government of China or Hong Kong. Additionally, the Commissioner of Police was granted the authority to control online content that is deemed a threat to national security and to compel the cooperation of internet service providers in the investigation of any such content.

== Censorship in colonial Hong Kong ==
Censorship in colonial Hong Kong was pervasively enacted through a mixture of legal, administrative, and cultural controls that served imperial interests while constraining freedom of expression. According to Michael Ng, the common law system practised in British Hong Kong during the period under study was complicit in the imposition of an authoritarian form of law and order, and was more interested in preserving the British Empire's interests and maintaining the power balance in the region than in safeguarding individual liberties in Hong Kong.

From the mid‑19th to the mid‑20th centuries, the British colonial government routinely employed libel laws, prosecutions, and official vetting to suppress criticism—especially within the Chinese‑language press.

In film as well, from the 1940s through the 1970s, colonial authorities deployed censorship both for political ends, targeting communist content during the Cold War and policing content deemed violent or explicit for moral regulation. Anti-communist content produced by the Kuomintang (KMT) was also targeted, such as the case of China Behind (1974) which was banned for its bleak critique of communist China.

The colonial government used the Control of Publications Consolidation Ordinance (1951) to regulate publications and suppress freedom of the press. One notable case resulted in the suppression of the newspaper Ta Kung Pao for six months (later reduced to 12 days) for its criticism of the colonial government's deportation of the Federation of Trade Unions-backed fire relief organisation officials and use of live fire against protestors. Deportation was also used as a method to control politics in education. Lo Tong, a principal at a pro-Beijing, patriotic middle school, had been deported in 1950 for raising the People's Republic of China (PRC) flag and singing the national anthem at his school.

Until 1995, colonial law allowed police to review and censor drama productions.

These practices reveal that the colonial rule of law in Hong Kong was not simply a guarantor of civil liberties, but rather a framework shaped by geopolitical considerations and the goal of maintaining colonial order.

== Censorship after the handover ==
Despite guarantees of free speech, public surveys in 1997 showed increasing fears of self-censorship by journalists of writings critical of the Central Government, although journalists indicated in a survey from the Hong Kong Journalists Association (HKJA) that they overwhelmingly did not hesitate to publish criticisms of China, and that actual instances of direct pressure from the Chinese government to change news were very rare. Since the handover, Hong Kong newspapers (and especially English-language media) have increased their use of a self-declared editorial independence as a marketing tool towards international audiences.

In 1998, there was a controversy about remarks made by magazine publisher Xu Simin alleging anti-mainland bias from the government-funded broadcaster RTHK. Although pro-RTHK commentators saw Xu's comments as coming from Beijing, Central Government representatives distanced themselves from his comments. In 2001, the HKJA expressed concerns that government's and Tung Chee-hwa's "shrill rhetoric [in vilifying Falun Gong] threatens open debate by encouraging self-censorship".

Hong Kong's ranking on the Press Freedom Index published annually by Reporters Without Borders was 18th in 2002. Since then, a number of factors, particularly self-censorship, and high-profile incidents affecting the media have pointed to increasing erosion of journalists' ability to report the news in an objective manner. In 2011, HKJA Chairwoman Mak Yin-ting (Chinese: 麥燕庭) commented on self-censorship due to growing business ties between Beijing and media owners, asserting that "Now, more than half of Hong Kong media bosses or high media management have been absorbed by the Communist government... They may consider whether reporting on some issues will affect the relationship between their bosses and the government." That year, Hong Kong's ranking on the Press Freedom Index dropped twenty places to 54th place. In a report published alongside the index, it was noted that "arrests, assaults and harassment worsened working conditions for journalists [in Hong Kong] to an extent not seen previously, a sign of a worrying change in government policy." Hong Kong's ranking in the index, which stood at 61st in 2014, gave up nine further places in the 2015 report. "Police misconduct" was cited as a factor. Journalists have complained about sensitive news stories critical of the government that they have been under undisguised pressure to change or soften. PEN Center believes that the controversy surrounding CY Leung's dealings with UGL were seriously under-reported in some media outlets. An increasing incidence of physical violence against journalists has been recorded, with the police being implicated in some of these, namely the HKJA noted that there were at least 28 attacks on journalists covering the Umbrella Revolution. All told, the incidence of censorship, political pressure to self-censor and intimidation is increasing, according to PEN American Center, International Federation of Journalists. As of 2025, Hong Kong's ranking in the Press Freedom Index was 140.

During the two-and-a-half-month protests in 2014, the patchy coverage of events and viewpoints on traditional media turned young people to social media for news. The Guardian described the protests as "the best-documented social movement in history, with even its quieter moments generating a maelstrom of status updates, shares and likes." People placed greater reliance on alternative media, some of which were launched during the protests. Even the recently defunct House News resurrected itself, reformatted as The House News Bloggers.

=== Notable examples ===
==== South China Morning Post ====
Since Robert Kuok acquired the South China Morning Post in 1993, there have been concerns over the forced departures, in rapid succession, of several staff and contributors who were considered critical of China or its supporters in Hong Kong. Before the handover, their popular cartoonist Larry Feign, humour columnist Nury Vittachi were dismissed. Since 1997, there have been numerous departures of China-desk staff, namely 2000–01 editorial pages editor Danny Gittings, Beijing correspondent Jasper Becker; China pages editor Willy Lam departed after his reporting had been publicly criticised by Robert Kuok. Gittings complained that he "repeatedly came under pressure to tone down coverage of politically sensitive issues". Editor-in-Chief Wang Xiangwei was criticised for his decision to reduce the paper's coverage of the death of Li Wangyang on 7 June 2012. Wang reportedly reversed the decision to run a full story, and instead published a two-paragraph report inside the paper; other news media reported it prominently. A senior staff member who sought to understand the decision circulated the resulting email exchanges, that indicate he received a stern rebuff from Wang. Wang is mainland-born, and is a member of the Provincial Committee of the Chinese People's Political Consultative Conference in Jilin; the paper has since stepped up coverage of the death and aftermath as major news stories. Reporter Paul Mooney, whose contract with the paper was not renewed in May 2012, said that the Li Wangyang story was not an isolated incident.

==== Apple Daily ====
The liberal Apple Daily has been under sustained pressure. In 1997, reporters were denied permission to cover a Hong Kong reception organised by the Chinese Foreign Ministry due to their history of criticising China. It has been subjected to advertising boycotts, its reporters have been assaulted, its owner attacked, and its premises fire-bombed. Its support of the Umbrella Revolution earned it unprecedented cyber-attacks; copies of its paper have been spoilt by masked thugs. It suffered a physical blockade which disrupted its logistics for almost one week. On 17 June 2021, its headquarter was raided, the assets were frozen and six executives were arrested. The paper announced its closure on 23 June.

On 2 July 2026, Hong Kong authorities stopped independent bookstores Elmbook and Luckwin from joining the annual Hong Kong Book Fair. The decision raised concerns about growing limits on publishing and free expression in the city. Authorities increased scrutiny of booksellers involved in selling politically sensitive books, including a biography of Jimmy Lai, the founder of the pro-democracy newspaper Apple Daily, who is serving a 20-year prison sentence for his activism.

==== TVB ====
Since 2009, TVB has drawn criticism on Internet forums for apparent pro-establishment bias. That year, its news department downgraded coverage of the 20th anniversary of the 1989 Tiananmen Square protests and massacre. The reporting, thought by many internet forum users as an act to gain the favour of the Central Government, was likened to CCTV and earned it the portmanteau "CCTVB". During the 2014 protests, TVB's broadcast of footage of seven police officers beating a protester on 15 October resulted in significant internal conflict during the broadcast. The pre-dawn broadcasts soundtrack which mentioned "punching and kicking" was re-recorded to say that the officers were "suspected of using excessive force". TVB director Keith Yuen questioned what grounds lead the footage to say "officers dragged him to a dark corner, and punched and kicked him"? The assistant supervisor of the news-gathering team responsible for the footage was immediately demoted to Chief Researcher, a post with only a part-time subordinate. Many journalists expressed their dissatisfaction with the handling of the broadcast, and some 80 TVB staff from all departments objecting to the handling sent a petition to management. After several of its reporters were assaulted by activists attending a pro-Beijing rally, over 340 station employees put their names to a petition condemning the violence. A director of production in the non-drama department ordered all petitioners to a meeting with their supervisors, where the employees were asked to remove their signature or jeopardise their year end bonuses. In March 2015, Luk Hon-tak, former director-general of the Democratic Alliance for the Betterment and Progress of Hong Kong (DAB), became the managing editor of TVB News in charge of political news stories. However, in 2015, the video, entitled "Suspected Police Brutality Against Occupy Central Movement's Protester", was declared the Best TV news item at the 55th Monte Carlo TV Festival; it was praised for its "comprehensive, objective and professional" report. It also won a prize at the Edward E. Murrow Awards in the Hard News category.

==== CLO interference in the 2012 Chief Executive election ====
During the Chief Executive elections in 2012, the pro-Beijing Ta Kung Pao dedicated its entire front page on 24 March 2012 to attacking former underground communist Florence Leung, who authored a book in which she alleged CY Leung only became the Secretary General of the Hong Kong Basic Law Consultative Committee in 1985 through having been an underground Communist Party member. Local press avidly reported on efforts of the central government's Liaison Office to rally support behind CY Leung, but said reports have been creating discomfort for officials. Albert Ho relayed complaints he has received about attempts by the Liaison Office to intimidate editors and media bosses. Media widely reported that Richard Li had received calls from CLO propaganda chief Hao Tiechuan (Chinese: 郝鐵川) dissatisfied at the reporting at his Hong Kong Economic Journal (HKEJ). The HKJA, which noted that the HKEJ had received complaints about its coverage from central government's liaison office, and condemned the "open violation" of the one-country two-systems principle. The International Federation of Journalists (IFJ) confirmed these allegations and expressed its concern. Johnny Lau, who authored a critique of both Henry Tang and CY Leung during the Chief Executive elections for the Sing Pao Daily News, in which he opined that neither Tang nor Leung were worthy of support nor sympathy, saw his piece changed to endorse Leung. Ngai Kai-kwong, editor-in-chief of the journal, who denied censorship or pressure from the liaison office, instead blamed "carelessness" in editing.

==== Commercial Radio ====
In late 2013, as a prelude to the renewal of its broadcasting licence, Commercial Radio Hong Kong replaced outspoken critic of CY Leung who hosted an influential prime-time morning talk show. Lee Wai-ling, long despised by the pro-establishment camp for her vocal criticism of the government, was abruptly shunted to a less prominent evening show. She was replaced by station chief executive himself, Stephen Chan Chi-wan, who denied political motivations. However, a former media executive said that it was "an open secret" that media operators are under considerable political pressure at the time of licence renewal, and some outspoken programme hosts disliked by the government are made to leave. On 12 February 2014, CRHK announced immediate termination of Li's employment contract, refusing to make any comment on the matter.

==== Ming Pao ====
In January 2014, Kevin Lau, chief editor of the liberal Ming Pao, was abruptly replaced by Chong Tien Siong, an inexperienced Singapore-based Malaysian journalist who, according to The Economist, is widely regarded as pro-establishment. As a result of Lau's dismissal, thousands of people attended a protest rally. Lau, known for his tough reporting on China, was brutally stabbed on 26 February by an assailant riding pillion on a motorbike. While the police suspect the attack was carried out by the Wo Shing Wo triad, it is widely believed to have been reprisals for his paper's investigative contribution to the International Consortium of Investigative Journalists (ICIJ) report on the offshore assets of China's leaders, including relatives of Communist Party general secretary Xi Jinping, former Premier Wen Jiabao, and several members of the National People's Congress. The journal came under pressure to downgrade the importance of a report on the 1989 Tiananmen Square protests and massacre.

==== Attack on University of Hong Kong ====
The University of Hong Kong was under attack by CY Leung, who used the occasion of his 2015 policy address to strongly criticise the students' union magazine Undergrad for publishing an essay within a recent issue in which Leung said "Hong Kong should find a way to self-reliance and self-determination". He objected to it on the grounds that "the statements, the remarks, are not in line with our constitutional status"; a book entitled Hong Kong Nationalism also came under his attack. He denied he was attacking free speech, but implied that there ought not to be such discussions on "crucial constitutional issues". Following Leung's attack, three large bookshop chains under pro-Beijing Sino United Publishing delisted the title. Wen Wei Po used the contents of a leaked University Grants Commission report in an attempt to derail the candidature of Johannes Chan, a prominent member of the pro-democracy movement, for pro-vice-chancellor of the university. According to an article written by Kevin Lau in Ming Pao, "parties close to the government" applied pressure on committee members behind the scenes to block Chan's appointment, and the finger was said to be pointed directly at the office of the Chief Executive.

==== RTHK ====
Chan Ka-ming and Shiu Ka-chun, two presenters of Radio Television Hong Kong whom were prominent in Umbrella Revolution were dismissed. The broadcaster denied political motives. In 2020, RTHK suspended the satirical show Headliner after government demanded apology for "insulting" police. In 2021, former host for Headliner Tsang Chi-ho was fired from the RTHK Radio 2 talk show. A few days later, a veteran journalist Allan Au was sacked from hosting a phone-in radio programme Open Line Open View.

=== Other political pressure ===
The offending Puma entry "D7689"

At a ballet premiere in November 2014, local media reported that one scene that contained images from the Cultural Revolution was cut; the production company blamed it on a "technical error".

To publicise its involvement in the 2015 Hong Kong marathon, Puma posted an image of a facsimile runner's identification tag bearing the number "D7689" onto its Facebook page. One supporter of the Loving Hong Kong movement objected to the number, writing to the global CEO of the manufacturer saying that it was disrespectful to chief executive CY Leung and threatened to initiate a mass boycott of the company's sportswear. The complainant explained that "689 is the code of the current CE of HKSAR well understood by HK people. D7 has the similar phonics in Cantonese as the 'F***' word". The company declared its political neutrality, and deleted the post. Lampooning the complaint, members of the public scoured the city and found many examples of innocent occurrences of the irreverent number. MTR staff were warned after one such example found, of a carriage bearing the "D689" marking, posted to their unofficial MTR Service Update page on Facebook.

==== Democratic Party confiscations ====
The Democratic Party saw a consignment of novelty toilet paper confiscated without reason by mainland customs. Various types of paper tissue, including 7,600 toilet rolls and 20,000 packets of tissue bearing likeness of CY Leung and destined for sale at a New Year's market were seized in Shenzhen. Such items were hot sellers at the New Year's market a year earlier.

==== Up Publications returns controversy ====
In March 2015, Up Publications, a small independent publishing house, complained that it was suddenly and unexpectedly faced with a large and unexplained number of returns from the three main subsidiaries of Beijing-friendly Sino United Publishing. Twenty titles were affected by the returns, to the serious detriment to the finances of Up Publications; many of the titles returned were not politically themed. The publisher was allegedly told by a bookshop source that its stance in the 2014 occupation and its publishing of books supportive of the Umbrella Movement were responsible. Although no reason was given for the returns, two of the delisted books about the occupation were strong sellers at independent bookshops.

==== Disappearances at Mighty Current publishing ====
Mighty Current, a company that publishes politically sensitive books – those critical of mainland leaders and discloses their personal secrets – and sells them at a bookstore named Causeway Bay Books, was marred by near-simultaneous disappearance in October 2015 of four people linked to it. Two of the men were last seen in Shenzhen, one in Hong Kong, and one was last heard from in Thailand. The news shocked the local publishing industry, and vice-chairman of the Hong Kong Alliance in Support of Patriotic Democratic Movements in China said that it was "hard not to associate the disappearance of the four people with Beijing's suppression of banned books".

In December 2015, a fifth member of the company, Lee Bo, also mysteriously vanished. He was last seen at his warehouse in Chai Wan in the early evening, preparing an order he had received for several books. Lee Bo's wife later received a telephone call from him from a telephone number in Shenzhen, uncharacteristically speaking in Mandarin Chinese. The fact that his home return permit was left at home led many fearing that he may have somehow been abducted by the mainland public security bureau and renditioned to Shenzhen. According to Hong Kong Alliance in Support of Patriotic Democratic Movements in China, the latest disappearance is linked to the imminent publication of a book on the life of Xi Jinping which includes details of his intimate life.

Gui Minhai, the first man to disappear, was ostensibly set free on 17 October 2017. On 19 January 2018, Gui was pulled from the train by a group of plainclothes men. In early February, Gui again appeared in a second confession before reporters from pro-establishment news outlets including the South China Morning Post.

==== Victor Mallet controversy ====
In August, a controversy erupted in 2018 when the FCC hosted a lunchtime talk with convenor Andy Chan on 14 August. Veteran Financial Times journalist Victor Mallet chaired the session. The event was opposed by the governments of China and Hong Kong, because the issue of independence supposedly crossed one of the "bottom lines" on national sovereignty. Upon returning to Hong Kong after a visit to Bangkok, Mallet was denied a working visa by the Hong Kong government. Mallet was subjected to a four-hour interrogation by immigration officers on his return from Thailand on Sunday 7 October before he was finally allowed to enter Hong Kong on a seven-day tourist visa.

Mallet's visa rejection was widely seen to be retribution for his role in chairing the Andy Chan talk which the FCC refused to call off. The HKJA, which has for years lived under the pressure of self-censorship, immediately warned of the "death knell of freedom of speech". Secretary for Security John Lee insisted the ban on Mallet was unrelated to press freedom, but declined to explain the decision.

==== Bao Choy Convicted for making false statement ====
Prior to the one year anniversary of the 2019 Yuen Long attack, television producer Bao Choy led the production of the documentary 7.21 Who Owns the Truth?, which aired in the programme Hong Kong Connection in July 2020 for public broadcaster Radio Television Hong Kong. It won two awards in Hong Kong. She tried to discover the owners of a few vehicles suspected of supplied weapons to the attackers who launched an indiscriminate attack on scores of people. She checked a box to declare that the vehicle registration searches were for "other traffic and transport related matters". Other options available when accessing the database are "legal proceedings" and "sale and purchase of vehicle". Previously, however, journalists had been able to declare that their searches were for "other purposes". Choy was arrested on 3 November 2020, and her home in Mei Foo was searched by police. She was found guilty and given a HKD$6,000 penalty.

==== Pulling books from public libraries ====
In 2018, Children's books with LGBTQ themes have been moved to the "closed stacks" of Hong Kong's public libraries due to pressure from anti-gay-rights group. Books written by pro-democracy activists such as Joshua Wong and lawmaker Tanya Chan disappeared a few days after national security law had been imposed in 2020. In 2021, the Leisure and Cultural Services Department confirmed that they have suspended services relating to the nine books, saying the move was to "avoid breaking the law." This time book written by Chinese-American writer and activist Yu Jie and Chinese dissident writer Liao Yiwu were removed. Hong Kong Nationalism written by Undergrad, the editorial board of the Hong Kong University Students’ Union was also no longer available.

=== Hong Kong national security law ===
In June 2020, the Hong Kong national security law was enacted by the Standing Committee of the National People's Congress. Among its provisions, it was made illegal to incite hatred of the Chinese central government and Hong Kong government, and the Commissioner of Police has the authority to control the dissemination of online content where there are "reasonable grounds" that there is a threat to national security, including compelling service providers to cooperate in investigations (including providing access to IP addresses or mobile phone numbers of users, and decrypting information), order the removal of such content, or restrict access to the platform. These laws are also asserted to be extraterritorial. After the law took effect, reports emerged that books containing pro-democracy materials were being pulled from libraries (even if they were written before the current anti-extradition movement) to assess their contents' compliance with the law. Joshua Wong — whose writings have been among those targeted by these actions – argued that the bill had imposed a "mainland-style censorship regime" on Hong Kong. As a voluntary measure to avoid the use of anti-government subversions made illegal by the law, some protesters began to use deliberately blank signs as a symbol.

The FT wrote that "China’s imposition of a national security law aimed at quashing political protests in the territory has also sent a chill through Hong Kong’s once vibrant publishing and media industry."

=== Internet censorship ===
Since the commencement of the Hong Kong national security law, the Hong Kong government has blocked access to at least one pro-democracy site.

=== Film censorship ===
Before 1997, colonial HK was not free from British colonial film censorship. Censors changed their strategy in the 1970s and 80s from suppressing mainland Chinese films representing revolutionary China during the Cold War to inhibiting films that might offend China from screening in Hong Kong.

In June 2021, the Hong Kong Film Censorship Authority introduced a policy to stay "vigilant to the portrayal, depiction or treatment of any act or activity which may amount to an offence endangering national security".

=== Music censorship ===
Music censorship in Hong Kong has become an escalating concern, significantly impacting prominent artists and their ability to express themselves freely. This trend reflects a tightening of governmental control, particularly in the aftermath of the 2019 pro-democracy protests and the implementation of the National Security Law.

One prominent method of censorship involves the abrupt cancellation of concerts and events, often without clear justification, for artists perceived as politically undesirable. In September 2021, Cantopop singer and activist Denise Ho had her scheduled concerts at the Hong Kong Arts Centre canceled due to stated concerns over "public order or public safety." This decision came shortly after pro-Beijing newspapers accused her of undermining China, leading to widespread belief that the cancellation was a punitive measure against her outspoken pro-democracy stance. Ho was subsequently forced to seek alternative platforms, including online streaming, to continue her work. Similarly, in May 2023, pro-democracy singer Anthony Wong Yiu-ming's booking for a concert at the Hong Kong Convention and Exhibition Centre was axed without a stated reason. While the HKCEC refused to comment on individual events, Wong, a vocal supporter of the 2014 Umbrella Movement and the 2019 protests, stated that he and his team were "calm" when they received the cancellation notice, implying an understanding of the underlying political motive. He expressed that the HKCEC management owed Hong Kong citizens an open explanation for taking away a citizen's right to perform for other Hongkongers. These incidents intensify concerns about shrinking artistic freedom and growing government control over cultural spaces. In December 2024, Cantopop singer Pong Nan's concert at the West Kowloon Cultural District's largest blackbox theatre, a government-managed venue, was also canceled without explanation. These repeated actions highlight how vague legal clauses are increasingly used to suppress artistic expression and pressure venues, impacting artists who have supported the city's democratic movement.

Allegations of unofficial blacklists and media control have also surfaced, further restricting artists' reach. In January 2022, Hong Kong's public broadcaster RTHK faced scrutiny over claims that it verbally instructed disc jockeys to refrain from playing music by ten prominent singers and bands. This unofficial "blacklist" reportedly included well-known pro-democracy figures like Anthony Wong Yiu-ming and Denise Ho, alongside groups such as RubberBand and C AllStar, whose music often carries social or political undertones. Although RTHK stated that song selection was based on "professionalism and suitability," the incident fueled concerns about increasing music censorship and the erosion of artistic freedom, widely perceived as linked to the artists' political stances.

A significant escalation in music censorship occurred with the May 2024 court injunction banning the protest song "Glory to Hong Kong." This ruling, which overturned an earlier decision, declared the song a "weapon" used to incite violence during the 2019 pro-democracy protests. The injunction allows the government to demand its removal from internet platforms, with narrow exceptions for academic and news activities without criminal intent. Critics, including the US State Department and human rights organizations, argue that this ban severely undermines Hong Kong's reputation for judicial independence and free speech. The injunction not only aims to prevent the song from being mistakenly played as the national anthem but also compels tech companies to comply with government requests for content removal, further aligning Hong Kong's online environment with mainland China's strict censorship controls. These actions collectively demonstrate a growing trend of music censorship in Hong Kong, impacting artists' ability to perform, distribute their work, and express themselves freely.

== See also ==
- Media of Hong Kong#Media freedom
- Separation of powers in Hong Kong
- Freedom of the press in Hong Kong
