= 6521 =

6521 may refer to:

- 6521 Pina, asteroid
- 6521 Project
- The year in the 7th millennium
