= 21st anniversary of the 1989 Tiananmen Square protests and massacre =

21st anniversary of Tiananmen Square protests of 1989
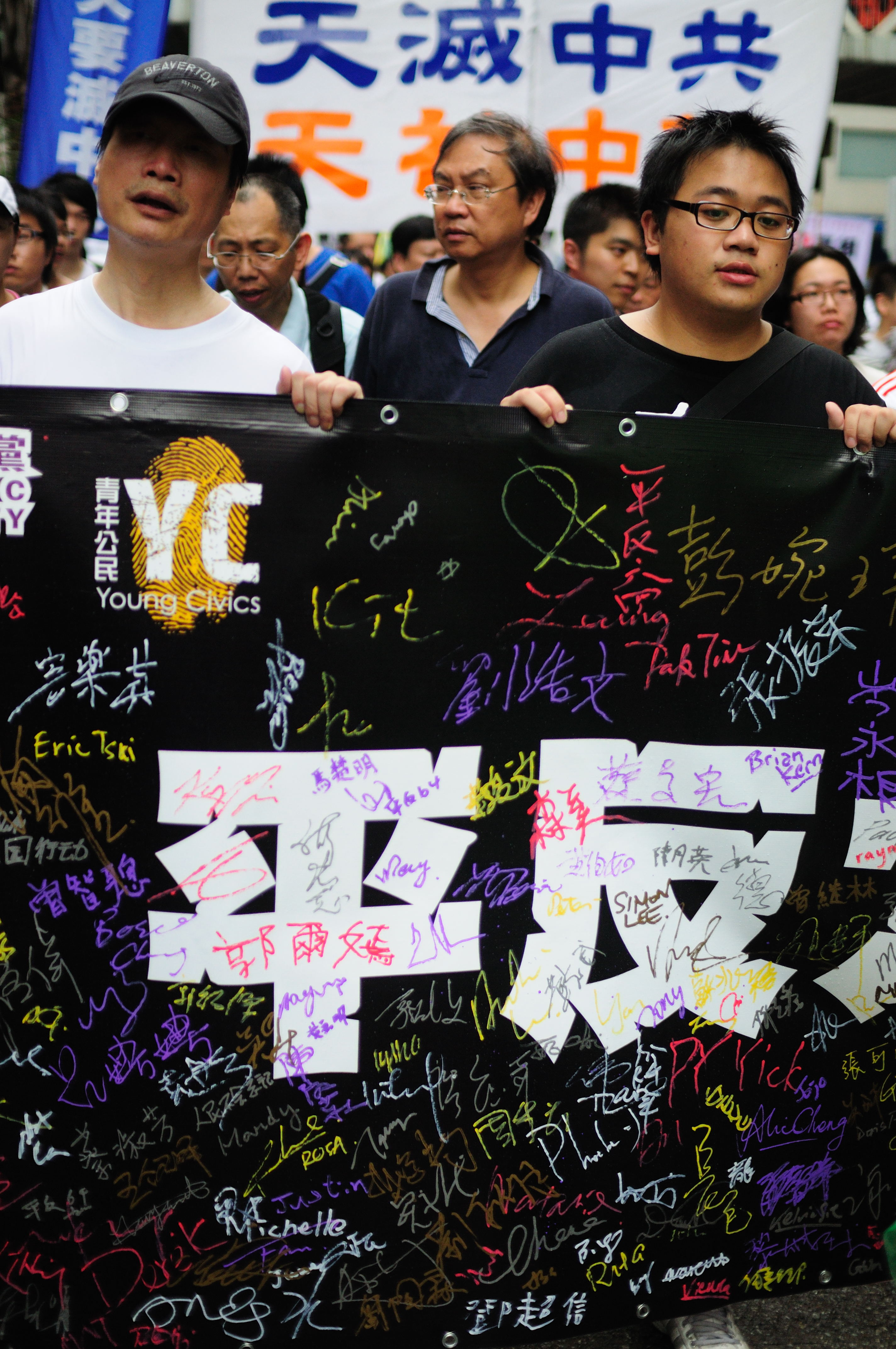
- marchers holding up a signed Young Civics banner '平反六四'
- Date: June 2010
- Location: Hong Kong
- Participants: Pan-democracy camp
- Outcome: protest march, candlelight vigil

The 21st anniversary of the 1989 Tiananmen Square protests and massacre began as a small march to commemorate the 1989 Tiananmen Square protests and massacre in Hong Kong. Hong Kong and Macau are the only places on Chinese soil where the 1989 crushing of China's pro-democracy movement can be commemorated, and the annual event to commemorate has been taking place in Hong Kong since 1990.

In 2010, the candlelight vigil attracted more than 150,000 participants – the controversies surrounding Hong Kong authorities' treatment of the democracy goddess statues, including a controversial ban by the Chinese University of Hong Kong, were widely cited as having had a significant effect on the turnout.

== Background ==
As the People's Republic of China has publicly embraced the one country, two systems model of governance for Hong Kong, the annual 4 June observance which has become a tradition since 1989 has continued after the transfer of sovereignty from Britain to China. It is the only place on Chinese soil where the event is openly commemorated in any way and on any scale.

In Hong Kong, the anniversary was commemorated in the backdrop of the 2010 Hong Kong by-election, the impending LegCo vote on the reform proposals made as a result of Consultation Document on the Methods for Selecting the chief executive and for Forming the LegCo in 2012, and the leak onto the internet of The Critical Moment – Li Peng Diaries, supposedly an insider's account of the top echelons of Chinese politics leading up to the fateful crackdown in 1989, written by the former Chinese Premier.

== Inside mainland China ==
cartoon published on the website of Southern Metropolitan Daily of a child drawing an image hugely resembling Tank Man on a blackboard

No discussion about or mention of the 1989 protests is tolerated in mainland China. Attempts to stage public events and protests commemorating the 21st anniversary in Beijing's Tiananmen Square have been largely thwarted by Chinese authorities, activists said. A planned commemoration on the campus of Beijing University failed owing to the presence of large numbers of state security police; "scuffles between police and bystanders" were reported outside the Great Hall of the People and numerous government departments, including the ruling party's Central Propaganda Department. Radio Free Asia reported that dissidents have been warned, put under house arrest, or incarcerated in the run-up to the anniversary.

Sina.com microblog prevented any online vigils by removing icons of a candle and cake so users cannot create tweets with emoticons holding vigils. However, under pretext of International Children's Day, Southern Metropolis Daily put up on 1 June a cartoon of a child drawing image hugely resembling the iconic Tank Man photograph by Jeff Widener on a blackboard which was later taken down, but not before it had circulated on the Internet.

== Japan ==
Elsewhere, a demonstration marking the 21st anniversary took place outside the Chinese embassy in Tokyo. As Japanese police moved a crash barrier to allow a car to enter the embassy compound, exiled student leader of the 1989 movement, Wu'er Kaixi, tried to evade the police and enter the grounds of the embassy. He said his aim was to turn himself in to the Chinese government. Wuer said he was wrestled to the ground by "seven or eight" Japanese police officers about 5 metres from the embassy gates. Upon his arrest, Wuer said that he was prepared to hand himself over to the Chinese authorities, so that he could go home to China – he had not seen his parents in 21 years. He was released two days later by Japanese police.

== Hong Kong march and statue incidents ==
On 30 May 2010 a pro-democracy camp march to the Central Government Offices by about 800 people started from Victoria Park. Some protesters continued to the Times Square shopping mall. Thirteen activists remained to protect the two 'Goddess of Democracy' statues. A scuffle broke out, and the activists were arrested with the statues taken away by police. Of the two statues, one was a 6.4-metre bronze, the other 2.2-metre made in white plastic material.

On 2 June Chen Weiming, creator of the statues, arrived in Hong Kong but was immediately deported. Lawmaker James To questioned why he was deported for political reasons. The next day pro-democrat Lee Cheuk-yan said "If the government will not release the statues immediately, what difference does its action have from the crushing of the first statue in Tiananmen Square by the Chinese army's tanks?" He threatened to gather people to surround the North Point police station. Lee further said HK has reduced to a place with no room even for a goddess statue. The statues were freed after the Hong Kong Alliance in Support of Patriotic Democratic Movements in China spend two hours negotiating with the police.

Eric Lai Yan-ho (黎恩灝), president of the students' union at Chinese University, knowing that the Pillar of Shame sculpture by Jens Galschiot had gone to the University of Hong Kong campus, wanted the two statues of democracy to go to the Sha Tin campus of the Chinese University of Hong Kong.

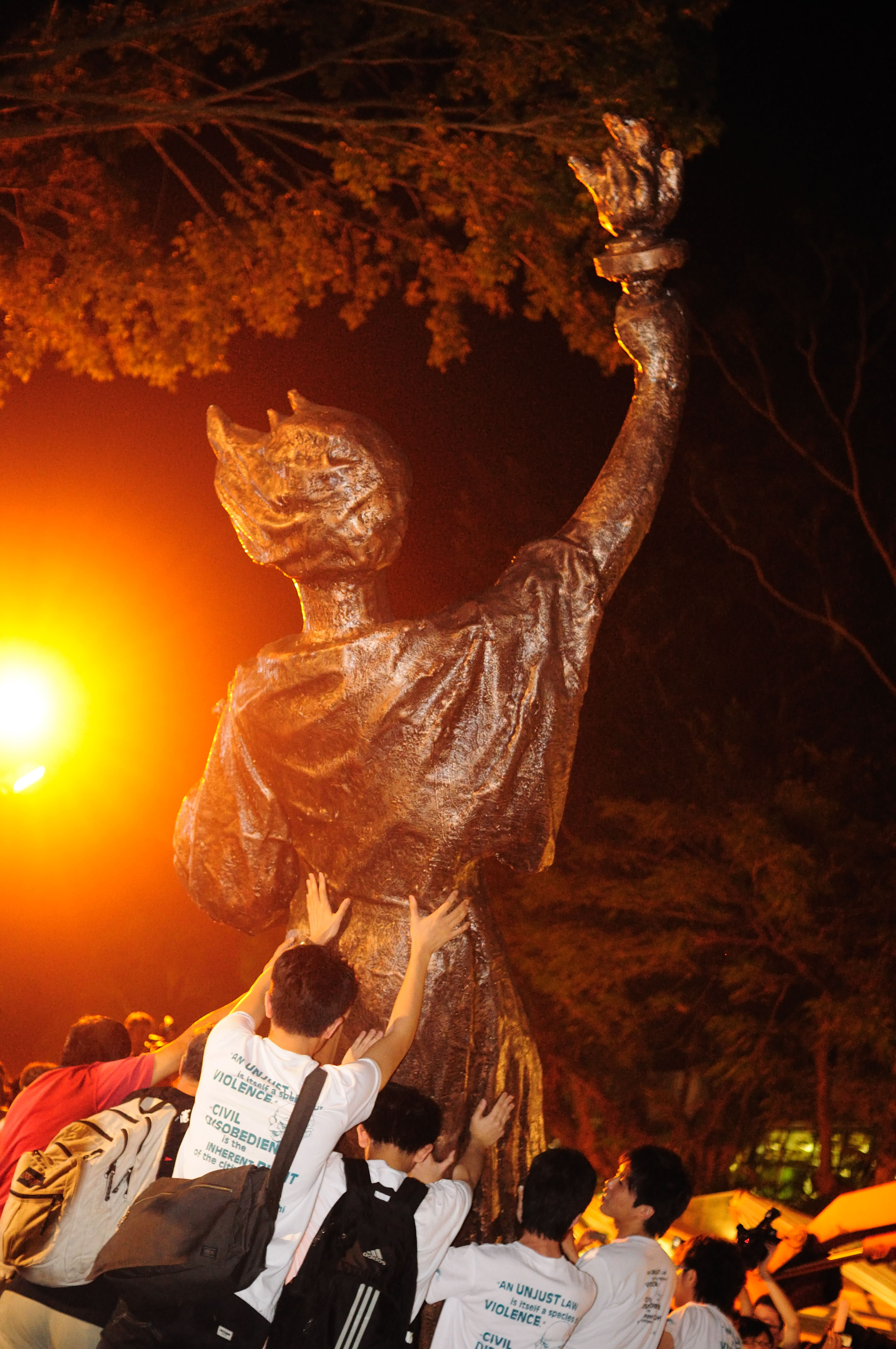
Students raise the statue themselves

The Chinese University of Hong Kong also became embroiled in controversy when they denied a request by students to house the democracy goddess statue permanently on its campus. They said it should not align itself with the actions or activities which project a political position that compromises political neutrality. Students complained that outgoing vice-chancellor Lawrence Lau, a member of the 11th National Committee of the Chinese People's Political Consultative Conference, was 'too establishment'. Student leader Eric Lai told a crowd of 2,000 people that the university officials should apologise for their opposition of the art display. Former LegCo president Rita Fan admitted there are some people in HK who just cannot forgive the Tiananmen Square protests and massacre. Later the statues were allowed on campus. The Alliance organised a transport truck and the delivery was escorted by police forces. The students themselves then raised it on campus. Vice-Chancellor designate Joseph Sung (沈祖堯) agreed to share responsibility for the committee's decision. He said the school was immature in handling the situation and underestimated the political situation. He said the incident was the biggest political controversy the university faced in over 20 years.

=== LegCo motion ===
Pan-democrats condemned the confiscation as suppression of free speech during a LegCo debate. As in previous years, Democratic Party chairman Albert Ho tabled a motion calling for the 1989 Tiananmen Square protests and massacre not to be forgotten and the 1989 pro-democracy movement be vindicated. The motion was backed by the 23 pan-democrats and independent Dr. Leung Ka-lau. But as in previous years, the private motion was defeated because it failed to secure a majority in the functional constituencies, despite their being only 15 votes against and 10 abstentions—the Democratic Alliance for the Betterment and Progress of Hong Kong and the Hong Kong Federation of Trade Unions voted against the motion; the Liberals and Economic Synergy abstained.

== Candlelight vigils ==
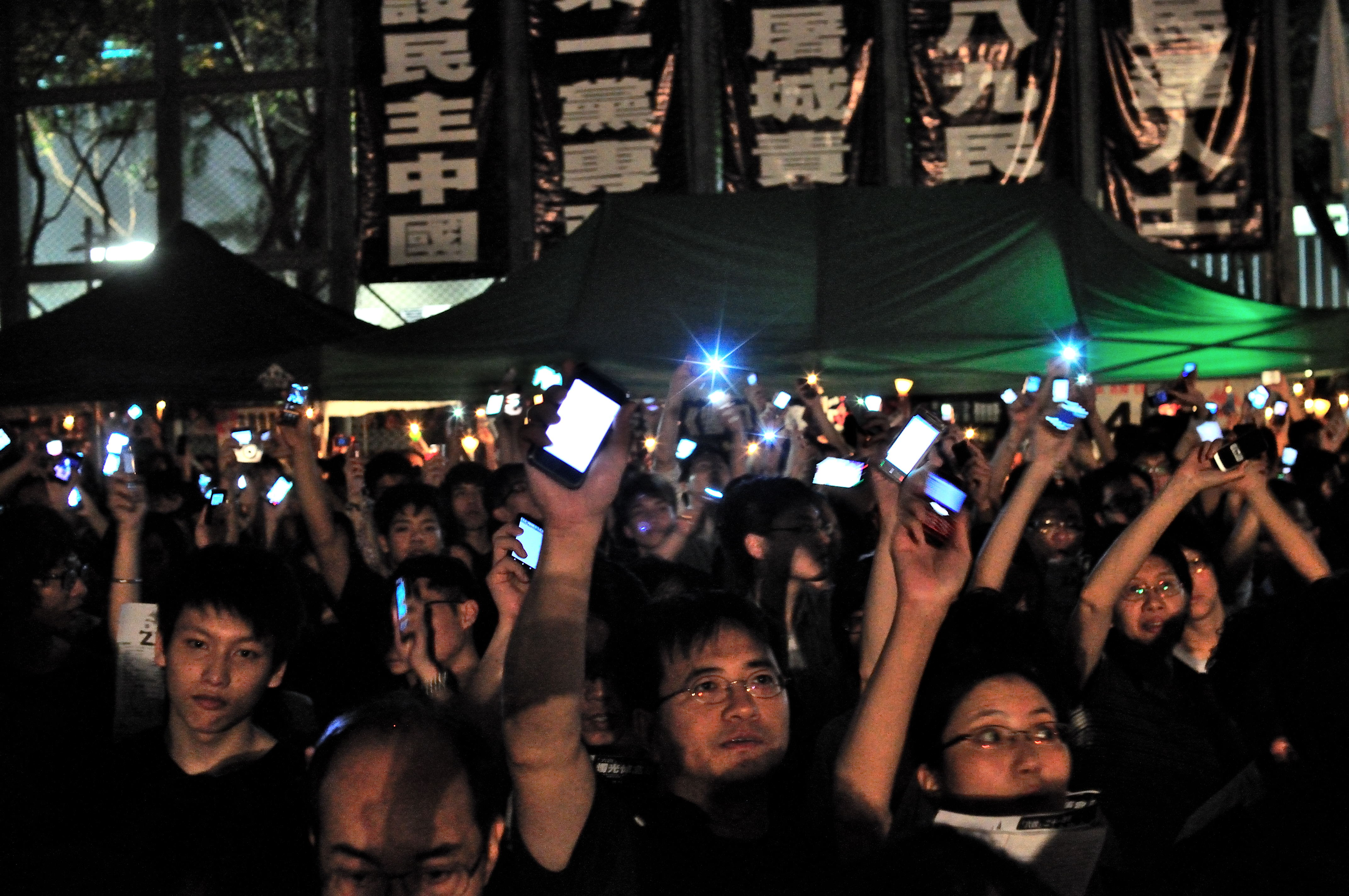
The vigil at Victoria park

According to event organisers, about 150,000 people attended a candlelight vigil at Victoria Park on 4 June matching the previous year's 20th anniversary. The police said 113,000 people showed up. This was a larger than expected amount as many people were angry about the confiscation of the statues. A recorded message was played by Liu Xia, wife of Liu Xiaobo who drafted Charter 08 and was imprisoned by the PRC for 11 years.

A gathering was also held at St. Dominic's church in Macau attended by about 700 people.

We never believed a government we so trusted would turn its troops against the people

— Tsang Yok-sing, The Financial Times, 5/6 June 2010

The Financial Times reported an unprecedented attack of the Chinese government by loyalist Tsang Yok-sing, the founder of the Democratic Alliance for the Betterment of Hong Kong in an interview before the vigil. Tsang was principal of the Pui Kiu Middle School at the time – he relived the shock, disbelief and emotion when the tanks rolled in and the Tiananmen democratic movement was crushed; staff and students were all shocked to learn of the government's brutality.

=== Demographic and motivations ===
Public anger over the seizures, and fears of political repression, were widely cited as directly inciting a record 150,000 participants (or 113,000 according to the police) to attend the 6-4 vigil. Lee Cheuk-yan, vice-chairman of the Alliance, said "...the basic number who insist on attending the vigil every year has increased rapidly, and 60 to 70 per cent of participants are now young people aged below 30," who inform themselves by other than traditional means. Ming Pao polled 336 people attending the candlelight vigil; 207 of them thought freedom to commemorate the 1989 Tiananmen Square protests and massacre was at risk. Commentator Frank Ching said that there was an erosion of trust the widely publicised police seizure in Times Square and the controversy at the Chinese University contributed. He said it was important for government and university authorities to work hard to maintain the trust of its people. Former legislator Albert Cheng said the main reason for the unexpectedly high turnout was more general public dissatisfaction with the government without a proper mandate, although the actions of the HK Police and Chinese University only added fuel to the fire.

== See also ==
- Memorials for the 1989 Tiananmen Square protests and massacre
- 20th anniversary of the 1989 Tiananmen Square protests and massacre
- 2010 March for universal suffrage
