= The Critical Moment =

2010 book of alleged Li Peng diary entries

The Critical Moment – Li Peng Diaries
- Traditional Chinese: 李鵬-六四日記
- Simplified Chinese: 李鹏-六四日记
- Literal meaning: Li Peng- June Fourth Diaries
Transcriptions

Alternative Chinese name
- Traditional Chinese: 關鍵時刻
- Simplified Chinese: 关键时刻
- Literal meaning: Critical Moment
Transcriptions

The Critical Moment – Li Peng Diaries is a book issued in 2010 in the United States by West Point Publishing House, a small publisher established by Zheng Cunzhu, a former 1989 pro-democracy activist. The book contains entries from a diary believed to be written by former Chinese Premier, Li Peng, covering the events leading up to and shortly after the 1989 Tiananmen Square protests and massacre.

Soon after the 21st anniversary of the 1989 Tiananmen Square protests and massacre in early 2010, a diary widely believed to have been penned by Li Peng was leaked onto the Internet. A copy of the original manuscript was given to New Century Press run by Bao Pu, son of Bao Tong, a former aide of General Secretary Zhao Ziyang. Although New Century authenticated the manuscript through months of research, the Chinese edition of the book by New Century was stopped on the basis of supposed copyright issues. US-based West Point Publishing subsequently took up the publication.

== Background to the manuscript ==
A 279-page manuscript, entitled The Critical Moment and subtitled Li Peng Diaries, started to circulate on the Internet in the run-up to the 21st anniversary of the crackdown. Bao, the publisher, said that a middleman had approached him with the manuscript because of the success in publishing Zhao's memoirs, entitled Prisoner of the State: The Secret Journal of Premier Zhao Ziyang. Bao said that after months of research, he and other editors agreed the book "should be authentic" and "it was very unlikely it was a fake". He nevertheless had some reservations, which he had been prepared to set out in a footnote.

The South China Morning Post had verified that substantial sections of the book were identical to the Internet manuscript. The newspaper said that Li's book had probably been ready for publication in early 2004 to coincide with the 15th anniversary of the 1989 protests. The SCMP cites the Yazhou Zhoukan saying that the manuscript was submitted for Politburo approval in autumn 2003; he was told several months later clearance had been denied. In June 2010, the diary was leaked onto the Internet.

== Contents ==
"From the beginning of the turmoil, I have prepared for the worst. I would rather sacrifice my own life and that of my family to prevent China from going through a tragedy like the Cultural Revolution"

— Li Peng, diary entry of 2 May 1989

The book takes the form of a series of selected diary entries penned between 15 April and 24 June 1989, revealing that the inner circle of the Communist Party was sharply divided on how to handle the protests. It documents tensions between then General Secretary of the Chinese Communist Party Zhao Ziyang and Li, and Li's direct involvement in pushing for action against the protesters. The SCMP reported that, after his formal retirement, Li worked hard on the book to get his side of the story told. In the foreword, dated 6 December 2003, Li writes: "I feel responsible to write up what I know of the truth about this turmoil to serve as the most important historical testimony."

Li wrote that his not being present to receive the students' petition at 11.45 am on 22 April 1989 was not the snub it was interpreted to be; he was simply 'unaware that the students were told that he would meet them'.

According to the SCMP, Li's 23 April entry strongly implies that, being worried that the student movement might lead to another Cultural Revolution, and acting on a suggestion from Yang Shangkun, he and Yang sought instructions from "comrade Xiaoping" secretly that night, ahead of the Politburo standing committee meeting which later voted to condemn the student movement. This is apparently at odds with official accounts that the meeting occurred on 25 April. Wu Guoguang, a former associate of Zhao, suggested that the secret meeting helped to form the consensus within the Politburo standing committee by firmly throwing his support behind Li.

According to Li, on 21 May 1989, two days after the decision to impose martial law in Beijing, Wen Jiabao had refused to authorise Zhao's telegram asking Wan Li to call an emergency session of the National People's Congress over the legality of imposing martial law. Student leaders had demanded the removal of the premier and retraction of martial law. Li said: "Wen Jiabao has done the right thing by refusing to send out the telegram approved by Zhao Ziyang." He said that both he and Hu Jintao approved using force against the students.

Li explicitly asserts that Deng Xiaoping personally took all the big decisions, including ordering the People's Liberation Army to crack down on Tiananmen Square on 4 June 1989; the decision to impose martial law was taken at a meeting with five Politburo Standing Committee members and president Yang Shangkun at Deng's home on 17 May, when it was also decided to replace Zhao Ziyang with Jiang Zemin as General Secretary of the Chinese Communist Party. He also asserts that during the crackdown, troops were attacked by armed rioters and were "forced to return fire in self-defense".

In closing, Li writes that "leading cadres of all levels could learn the lesson from history and try their best to avoid similar incidents from taking place, or they should do their best to contain [civil unrest] to the smallest scale so that they would not affect the work [of the Communist Party] adversely".

== Aborted publication ==
Li Peng 4 June Diaries (Ed: New Century Press)

Three days before the book was due to have been released, New Century Press aborted the launch, saying on its website: "According to copyright information provided by relevant institutions and Hong Kong copyright laws, we have to cancel the publication of the Tiananmen Diary of Li Peng, which is originally scheduled for June 22, due to copyright reasons".

Founder Bao Pu said he was approached by unnamed "relevant institutions" which provided him with copyright information. News of the impending publication of the text broke on the eve of the 21st anniversary, giving the authorities enough time to react and block the release.

Bao explained that he had been prepared to publish the text despite the ambiguous copyright status of works by party leaders, which are subject to approval by the Politburo. He said: "If the author, who has a certain official post, wants to publish something like a diary, he really has to go through the publication procedure to get approval... [However,] It isn't defined whether it's legal or illegal to publish outside China."

Cai Yongmei, editor-in-chief of Open Magazine in Hong Kong, believes Beijing intervened because the book would have been a great embarrassment to Hu and Wen. "Li Peng has been eager to publish the book since 2004 or he would not have penned it. The Wall Street Journal commented that, although the publisher dodged questions about the reason for the cancellation, he blamed initial leaks in the press for drawing undue attention which eventually contributed to the cancellation of the project.

== Responses ==
The SCMP quoted Perry Link saying: "The responsibility for 4 June haunts all of these people and none of them want to take it. Even Li Peng ... doesn't want to be seen as having blood on his hands... None of the leaders, Li Peng, Yang Shangkun, Deng Xiaoping, wanted to be viewed as butchers. They were embarrassed about the massacre and embarrassed about the prospect of the massacre, they didn't want their own names associated with the bloodshed."

Gao Yu said that Li was trying to shirk his responsibility: "Li Peng was taking the hard-line position and whatever explanation is given, these were only details and it was done when Zhao Ziyang wasn't in Beijing... This only serves to prove that he did report to Deng while Zhao was not there ... "
