= Lady Liberty Hong Kong =

2019 Hong Kong statue

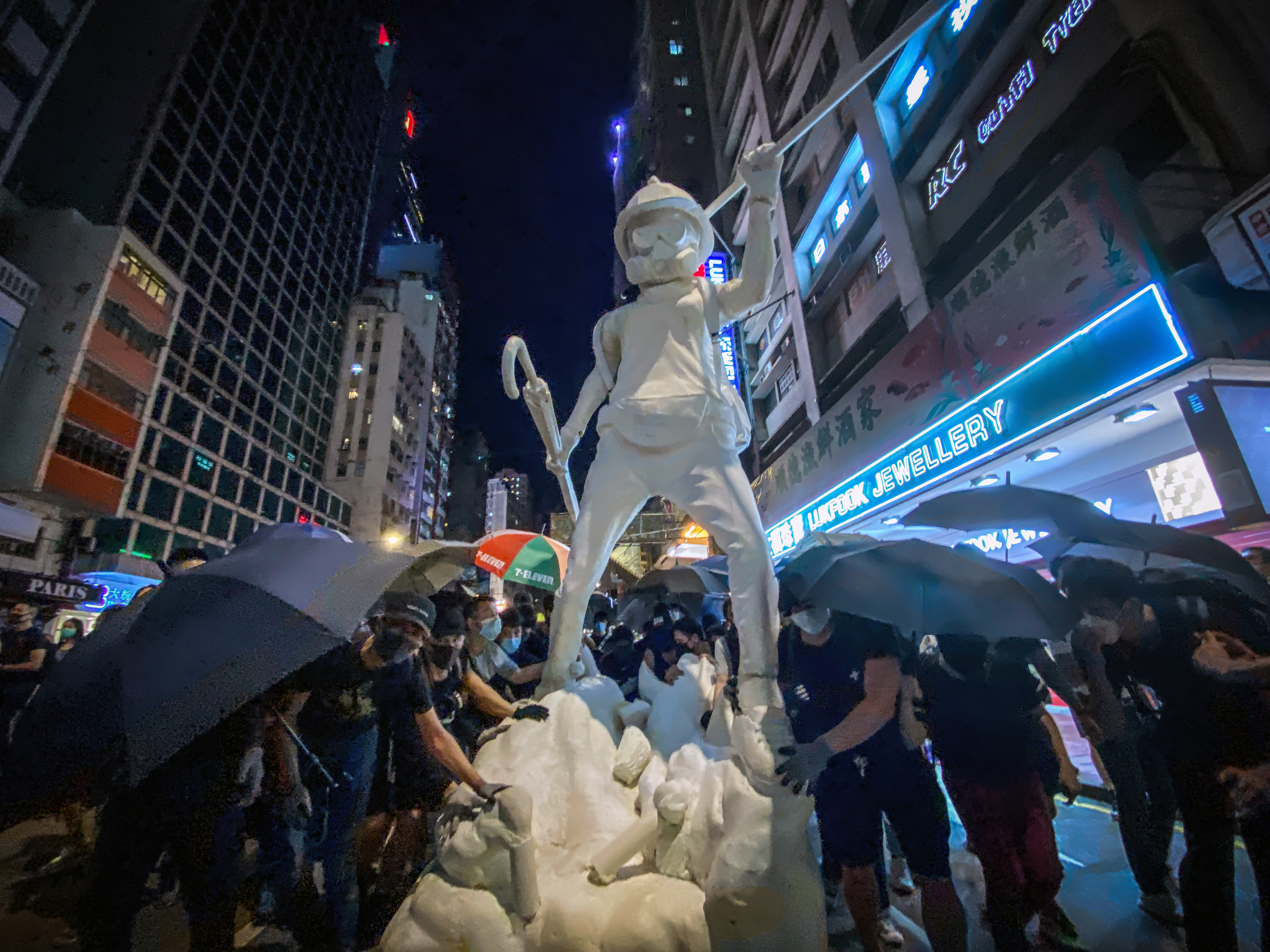
- Lady Liberty Hong Kong during a demonstration on 4 October 2019.
- Year: 2019
- Dimensions: 3 m (120 in)
- Weight: 80 kg (180 lb)
- Condition: destroyed, missing

Lady Liberty Hong Kong (Chinese: 香港民主女神像) was a 3-metre (9.8 ft) statue that was created during the 2019–2020 Hong Kong protests, designed by users from the LIHKG forum. Created in August 2019, the statue was publicly displayed in multiple locations before being hauled to the top of Lion Rock, intended as the statue's "final resting place"; however, the statue was vandalised and removed by unknown assailants the next day.

== Inception ==
In August 2019, a design team came up with nine design proposals for the statue. An online vote was held on LIHKG, leading the team to select the "Goddess of democracy" design, which was modelled after a female demonstrator whose eye was allegedly ruptured by a bean bag round shot by the police. The team launched a crowdfunding campaign, which successfully raised a total of HK$203,933 in 6 hours, surpassing its HK$200,000 goal. Roughly HK$50,000 was spent on the statue, and the remaining HK$150,000 was donated to the 612 Humanitarian Relief Fund in support of the protest movement.

The team involved in the production included:

- Core team of 15 people, 5 people
- Graphic design team, 30 people
- 3D design team, 10 people
- 3D printing team, 30 people
- Metal structure team, 10 people
- Sculpture production team, 25 people
- Counter-powered driver, 5 people
- Transportation and site assembly team of 20 people
- 8,000 netizens who participated in the draft design vote

=== Design concept ===
The design concept of Lady Liberty Hong Kong was inspired by a typical demonstrator's outfit: a yellow helmet, eye mask and a gas mask; the right hand holds an umbrella, while the left hand holds a banner with the slogan "Liberate Hong Kong, Revolution of our times", a commonly used slogan in the protest movement. The team has stated the statue symbolised "the unparalleled bravery of Hongkongers in voicing out amidst [the] rain of bullets and tear gas in the prolonged anti-extradition bill movement".

== Exhibition ==
The statue was first publicly displayed at the Chinese University of Hong Kong on 31 August. The statue was also displayed at the "Anti-Abusive and Anti-authoritarian Rally" held at Chater Garden on 6 September and was temporarily moved to the University of Hong Kong afterwards. On 13 October, the statue was hauled to the top of Lion Rock by a team of 32 volunteers, including 16 professional climbers. The organisers had intended Lion Rock as the statue's "final resting place", as "a symbolic gesture to infuse a refreshed mindset for the fight for democracy." However, on the next morning, the statue was toppled and vandalised with red paint by unknown assailants.

== See also ==
- Goddess of Democracy, similar statue created during the 1989 Tiananmen Square protests
- Hong Kong's Statue of Democracy, a replica unveiled in 2008 to commemorate the 1989 protests
