= Chen Weiming (sculptor) =

New Zealand sculptor

Chen Wenming
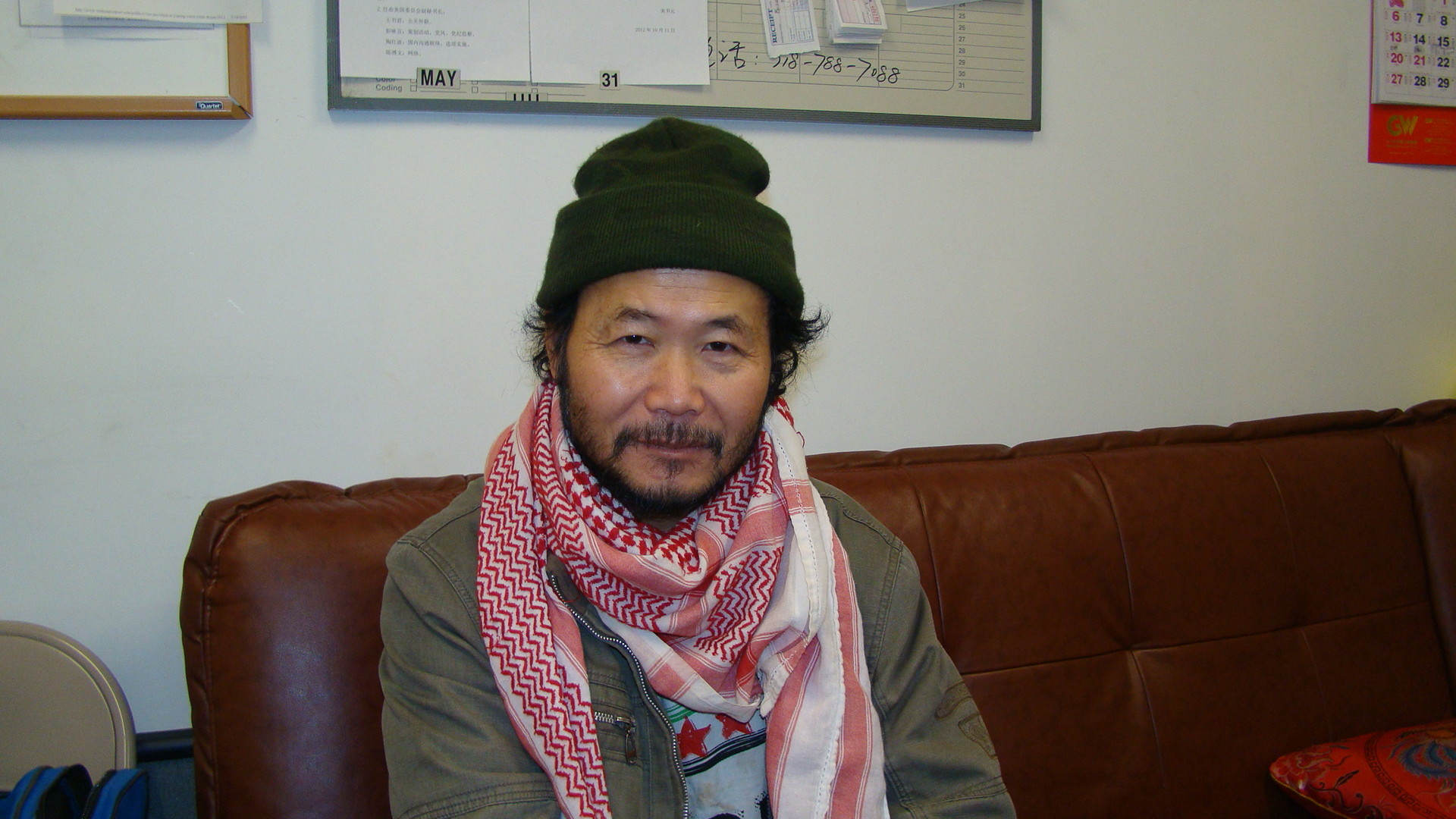
- Chen Weiming in Syria, 2010.
- Born: Hangzhou, China

Chen Weiming (Chinese: 陳維明, born c. 1970) is a Chinese-born New Zealand artist and sculptor. Chen was commissioned by the New Zealand government to create a 3-metre bronze statue of Edmund Hillary in 1991. In 2008, he created a 6.4 metres high replica of the Goddess of Democracy that stood in the Chinese University of Hong Kong until 23 December 2021. In June 2021 and June 2022, Chen unveiled a pair of 30-foot-high sculptures at Yermo's open-air High Desert art centre called Liberty Sculpture Park. Chen created a large-scale relief representation of the Tiananmen massacre in 2009, on the 20th anniversary of the massacre. The Tiananmen massacre relief and the Goddess of Democracy replica were both displayed in Hong Kong during protests in 2010.

Chen was born in Hangzhou, China, and emigrated to New Zealand in 1988. He holds a New Zealand passport as well as permanent residence in the United States, and lives in both countries.

In 2011, Chen traveled to Syria to fight alongside Free Syrian Army rebels fighting in the Syrian uprising.

== See also ==
- Goddess of Democracy (Hong Kong)
- Liberty Sculpture Park
