= Goddess of Democracy (Hong Kong) =

Sculpture in Hong Kong honoring Chinese pro-democracy movement

- 民主女神
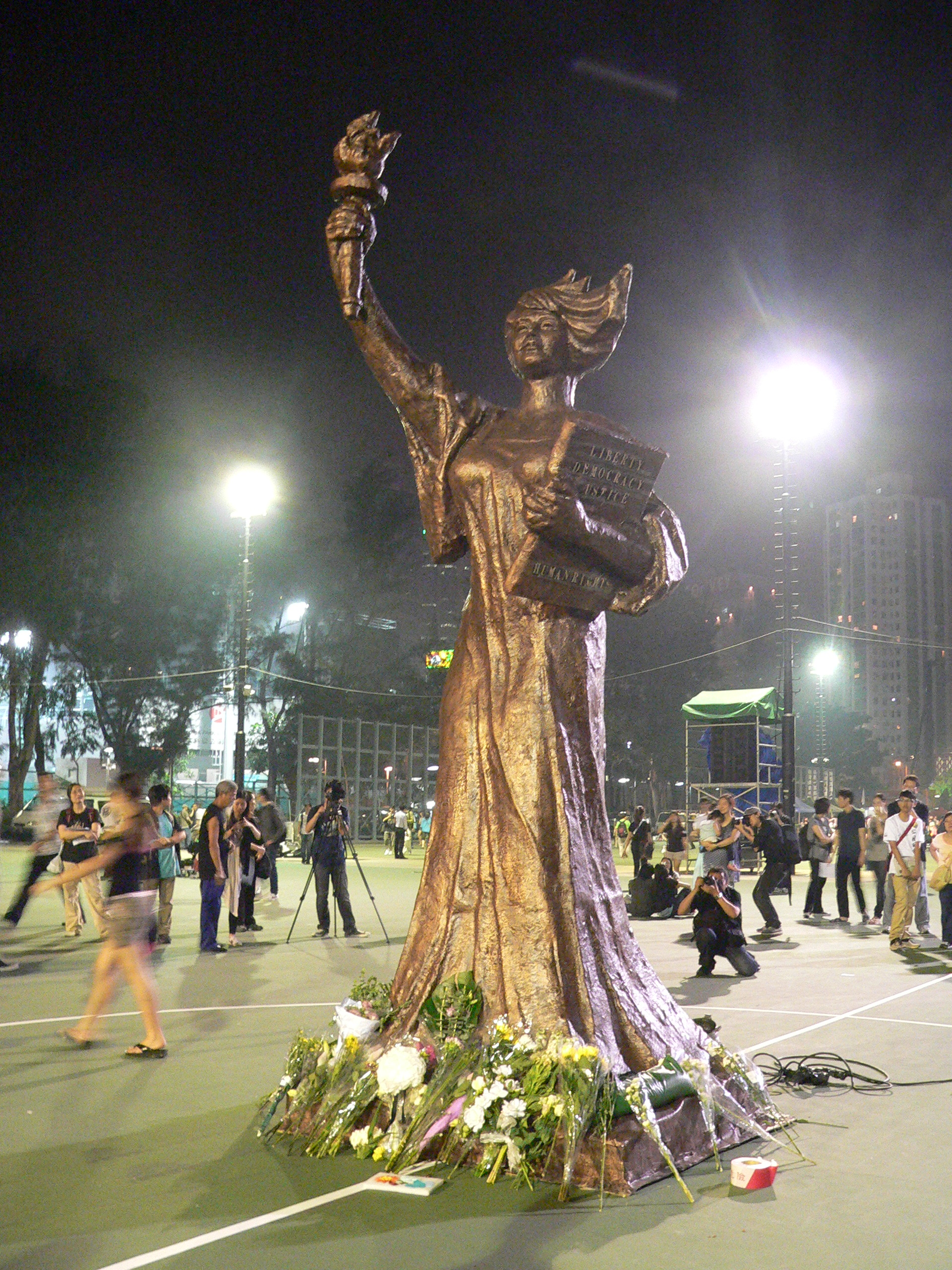
- Bronze Goddess of Democracy at the 21st anniversary of the Tiananmen protests of 1989
- Interactive map of Goddess of Democracy
- Location: Chinese University of Hong Kong
- Coordinates: 22.412908°N 114.209733°E
- Designer: Chen Weiming
- Type: sculpture
- Material: imitation copper
- Height: 6.4 m (21 ft)
- Completion date: 2008; 18 years ago
- Dedicated to: victims of the 1989 Tiananmen Square protests and massacre
- Dismantled date: 24 December 2021

Hong Kong's Goddess of Democracy is a 6.4-metre faux bronze statue sculpted by Chen Weiming, inspired by the original 10-metre tall Goddess of Democracy. The original foam and papier-mâché statue was erected by the Chinese pro-democracy movement in Tiananmen Square at the end of May 1989, and destroyed by soldiers clearing the protesters from Tiananmen square on 4 June 1989.

Three successive political controversies surrounded the statue in 2010 in the backdrop to the twenty-first anniversary of the suppression of the Tiananmen pro-democracy movement. Firstly, it was seized by the Hong Kong police at a street rally at the public open space in Times Square, Causeway Bay on the grounds that the display violated safety regulations, which was, according to the protesters, a trumped up charge. Secondly, the sculptor was denied entry into Hong Kong on 2 June, when he journeyed to Hong Kong to examine the sculpture for possible damage whilst in police custody. Thirdly, the erection of the statue on the campus of the Chinese University of Hong Kong (CUHK) was denied by university authorities, to the ire of the student leadership. The various controversies surrounding the statue reportedly increased the number of people attending the annual 4 June vigil in Hong Kong to historical highs.

Since the record turnout for the anniversary vigil, and under pressure from students, the Chinese University administration acquiesced in allowing the statue a 'temporary home' near the Chinese University exit of the University station. On 23 December 2021, the statue was taken down by Hong Kong authorities.

== Background ==
The original Goddess of Democracy statue has become an icon of liberty and a symbol of the free speech and democracy movements. The Chinese government has tried to distance itself from any discussions about the original statue or about the Tiananmen Square protests, and in the case of the Victims of Communism Memorial it called the building of a replica an "attempt to defame China." Several replicas of the statue have been erected worldwide to commemorate the events of 1989.

Chen Weiming in front of his Tiananmen Massacre relief sculpture

As no discussion about or mention of the 1989 protests is tolerated in mainland China, and because China has publicly embraced the one country, two systems model of governance for Hong Kong, the annual 4 June observance – a tradition since 1989 – has continued after the transfer of sovereignty from Britain to China. Also, this 6.4-metre statue sculpted by US-resident Chen Weiming is the only 'Goddess of Democracy' to find a home on Chinese soil.

The statue was sculpted of an imitated copper material, has been exhibited in the front of the United States Congress in the American capital after its completion in 2008. Another work of the sculptor, a relief measuring 6.4 m wide by 3.2 m high entitled Tiananmen Massacre completed in June 2009, joined the statue in Hong Kong in 2010.

== Times Square incident ==
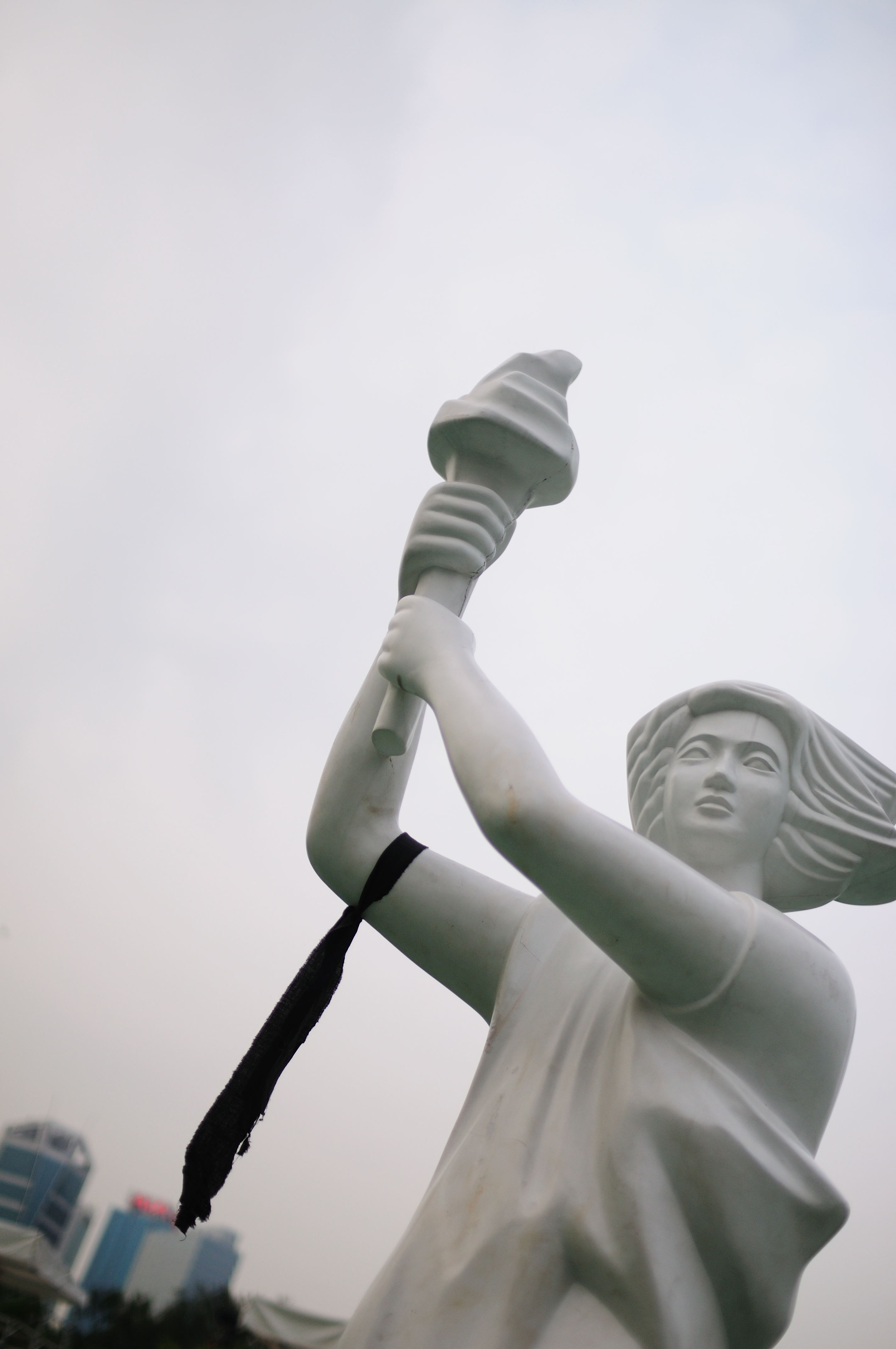
White plastic Goddess of Democracy replica

On 29 May 2010, Hong Kong police seized a statue and a six-metre-long relief – named 天安門大屠殺 (Tiananmen Massacre) – the Hong Kong Alliance in Support of Patriotic Democratic Movements of China (the Alliance) erected in Times Square ahead of the 21st anniversary of 6 June Tiananmen Square protest; organisers were arrested for lacking a licence to organise "public entertainment". A second statue was erected following the anniversary march to commemorate 4 June pro-democracy movement, but was also seized by police citing the same Places of Public Entertainment Ordinance. Thirteen people who had been standing guard over the statue were arrested by police. Both statues were replicas of the 1989 Tiananmen Square statue – one statue was 6.4-metre bronze and the other a 2.2 m rendering in white plastic.

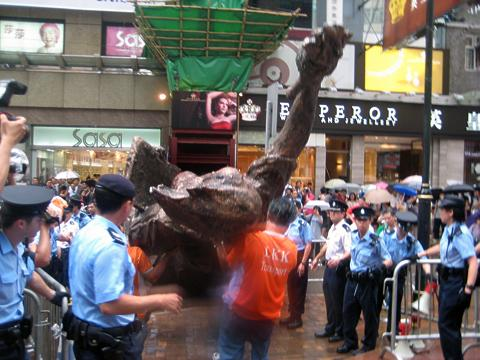
The bronze statue in Times Square being confiscated by the HK Police

The seizures were controversial. Although the management of Times Square said it preferred activities without political elements, it had not complained before police intervened. The police force said it was not responsible for enforcing the public entertainment law, so it had no statistics concerning it; the Food and Environmental Hygiene Department said only seven prosecutions had been made under the law since the beginning of last year. A government spokesman said that the art pieces would be returned "under condition that the police's relevant requirements will be followed." The Leisure and Cultural Services Department stipulated insurance and approval from registered engineers to guarantee that any object taller than 1.7 metres used on 4 June met safety standards. Activists refused the pre-conditions, and Alliance Deputy chairman Lee Cheuk-yan threatened that North Point police station, where the pieces were being held, would be surrounded at 6 pm on 3 June by citizens demanding their release. After the statues and activists were hauled away, the Alliance displayed a 4.5-metre painting of the Goddess of Democracy in Times Square; several activists dressed like the statue.

Apple Daily reported that similar observances with props were held at Times Square the previous year, and passed without police harassment. The police said that they had acted on a request from the Environment Department on 29 May; the Home Affairs Bureau said it was not notified ahead of the action. After several hours of negotiations with leaders of the Alliance, Police released the statues on 1 June notwithstanding activists' refusal to undertake not to display the statues within the vicinity of Times Square again. The police released it as 'a goodwill gesture', saying that they understood the organisers' need to have the statue set up for the vigil in the evening of 4 June; Loyalist former President of LegCo, Rita Fan, citing legal experts, said the unprecedented action of the police was improper. However, Police defended their action, saying the force had handled the situation, including the return of the art pieces, in a "lawful, reasonable, and sensible manner".

Civil rights groups and Pan-democrats reacted angrily to the seizure, warning that freedom of expression was under threat; Chinese Human Rights Defenders called the government actions "an unprecedented act of interference with the territory's commemorative activities." Public anger over the seizures, and fears of political repression, were widely cited as a direct cause for the record 150,000 participants (or 113,000 according to the police) to attend 4 June vigil. Political commentator Michael Chugani said that the police's reason for seizing two replica Goddess of Democracy statues was unconvincing, and that the public had a right to know from how far up the command chain the heavy-handed order came. He said that this challenge to free expression in Hong Kong should not be conflated with the Tiananmen issue. The LegCo Food Safety and Environmental Health Committee of LegCo called an extraordinary meeting for 21 June, the FEHD and the Home Affairs Bureau were asked to be present to account for their actions, their reasons, and the identity of the chief decision-maker for the confiscations. Although health minister York Chow said the Food and Environmental Hygiene Department had "received information" from an undisclosed source that people were breaking the law in Times Square, departmental director, Cheuk Wing-hing, reported to the LegCo panel that he had given the order, acting on news reports.

== Sculptor's entry visa controversy ==
Upon hearing that his works had been seized by police, the sculptor decided to go to Hong Kong on his own initiative and to examine the sculpture for possible damage whilst in police custody; he boarded a plane from Los Angeles on 31 May, but was refused entry into Hong Kong. Chen, who has visited Hong Kong twice before, had arrived at the airport on the night of 1 June. Democratic Party legislator James To acted as Chen's lawyer during his two-hour interrogation by the authorities. To said Immigration officials questioned Chen about his visit, and summarily deported him for refusing to sign a document saying he agreed to leave. Although Immigration officers told To during the interrogation that "no decision had been made," To said he was informed 15 minutes after leaving (at 3 am) that Chen would be repatriated. To said that Chen was hurriedly put on a plane before an appeal could be launched: "I requested the legal [expulsion] order to be faxed from the immigration office [so that I could respond]. Before I received the document at 9.50 am, I was told at 9.40 am Chen was on the plane." James To decried the "dirty tricks" employed, and said that people were very annoyed that Hong Kong was denying "a very humble sculptor" entry for political reasons.

The Immigration Department handles all entry applications in accordance with the law and prevailing policies and having due regard to individual circumstances

— IMMD June 2010

Chen said the Hong Kong government's denial of his entry was an edict of the central government in Beijing. He continued: "The confiscation of my statue was due to the sensitivity of history that happened 21 years ago, which was reflected in my sculpture." The immigration department issued a statement saying it would not comment on individual cases, and that it "handles all entry applications in accordance with the law and prevailing policies and having due regard to individual circumstances". Secretary for Security Ambrose Lee denied that the government had a blacklist: "The Immigration Department works in accordance with established policies and laws of Hong Kong. It has to take into account the interests of Hong Kong when deciding who can come and who cannot come."

== CUHK controversy ==
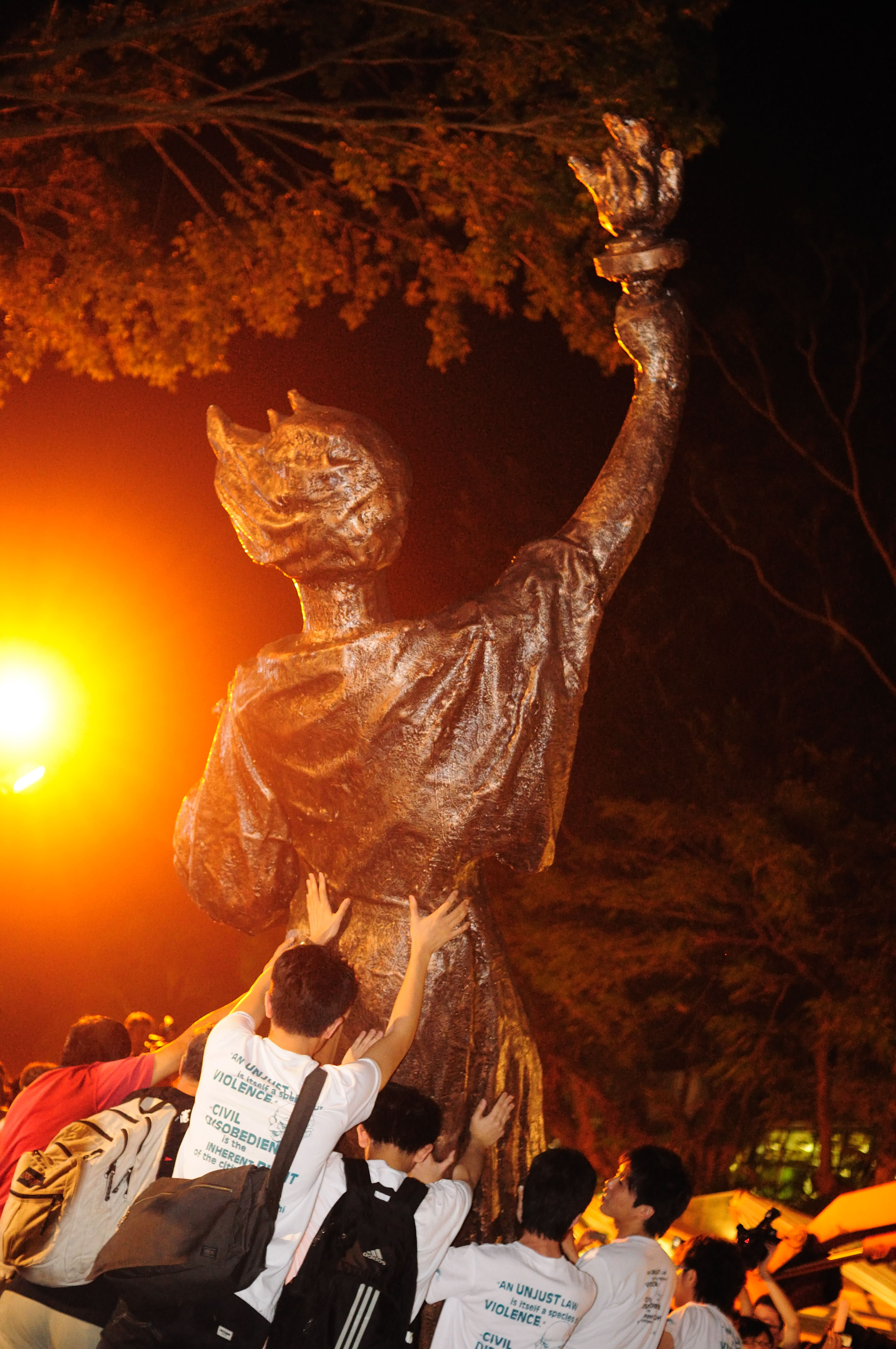
Students putting the statue in its place at the university campus

The administrative and planning committee of the Chinese University of Hong Kong convened an emergency meeting for 1 June after receiving an application from the CUHK student union on 29 May to permanently locate a statue on campus. The meeting was chaired by incumbent vice-chancellor Lawrence Lau. The next day, the university announced its decision not to grant the request; the University said it should not align itself with the actions or activities of a political nature that may compromise its political neutrality. However, students were prepared for a stand-off against the University, saying they would ensure the statues were accommodated on campus "at all costs". University's staff and students' unions accused the committee of self-censorship. The staff union said: "As an institution of higher learning dedicated to the pursuit of knowledge and truth, the Chinese University should maintain so-called 'neutrality' by facing historical facts bravely". Student union president Eric Lai also accused the administration of hypocrisy, citing that university president Lawrence Lau lacked neutrality because he served on advisory bodies for the Hong Kong and central governments.

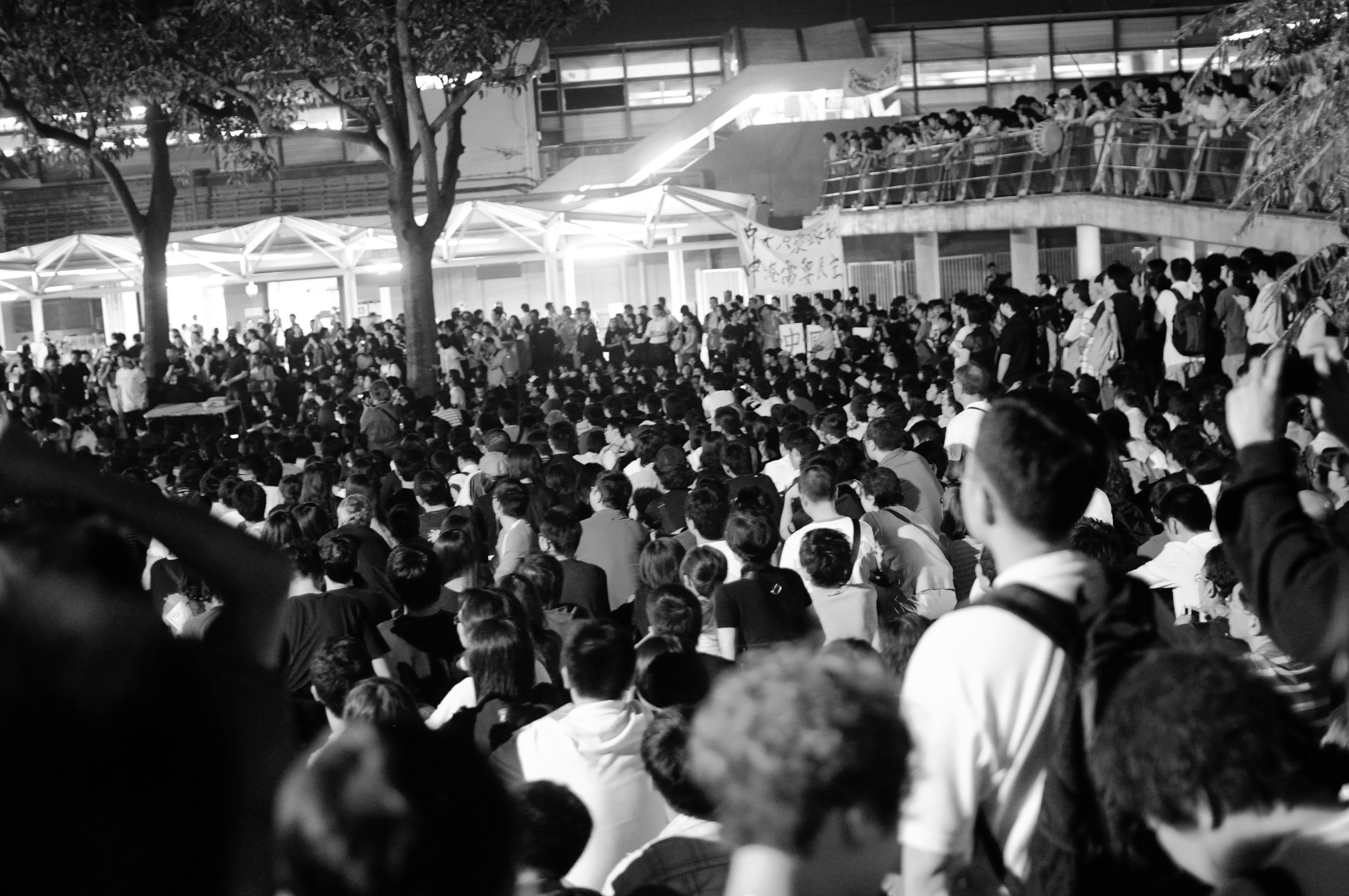
Students attend an open-air meeting at the university campus

Lai told a crowd of 2,000 people that the university officials should apologise for their opposition of the art display. On 4 June, backed by storms of protest, the university capitulated to the students' demands for the statue to be allowed on campus. The Alliance organised a transport truck and the delivery was escorted by police forces. The students themselves then raised it on campus.

Vice-chancellor designate Joseph Sung, who was out of town, but was consulted on the vote, admitted that it was the biggest political storm in 21 years. He said he was opposed to invoking political neutrality as the reason for refusal, and that others shared that view. He added that the management team was "immature" and "inexperienced" in handling the incident, and pledged improved communication and dialogue with students on the future of the statue when he takes up the post next month.

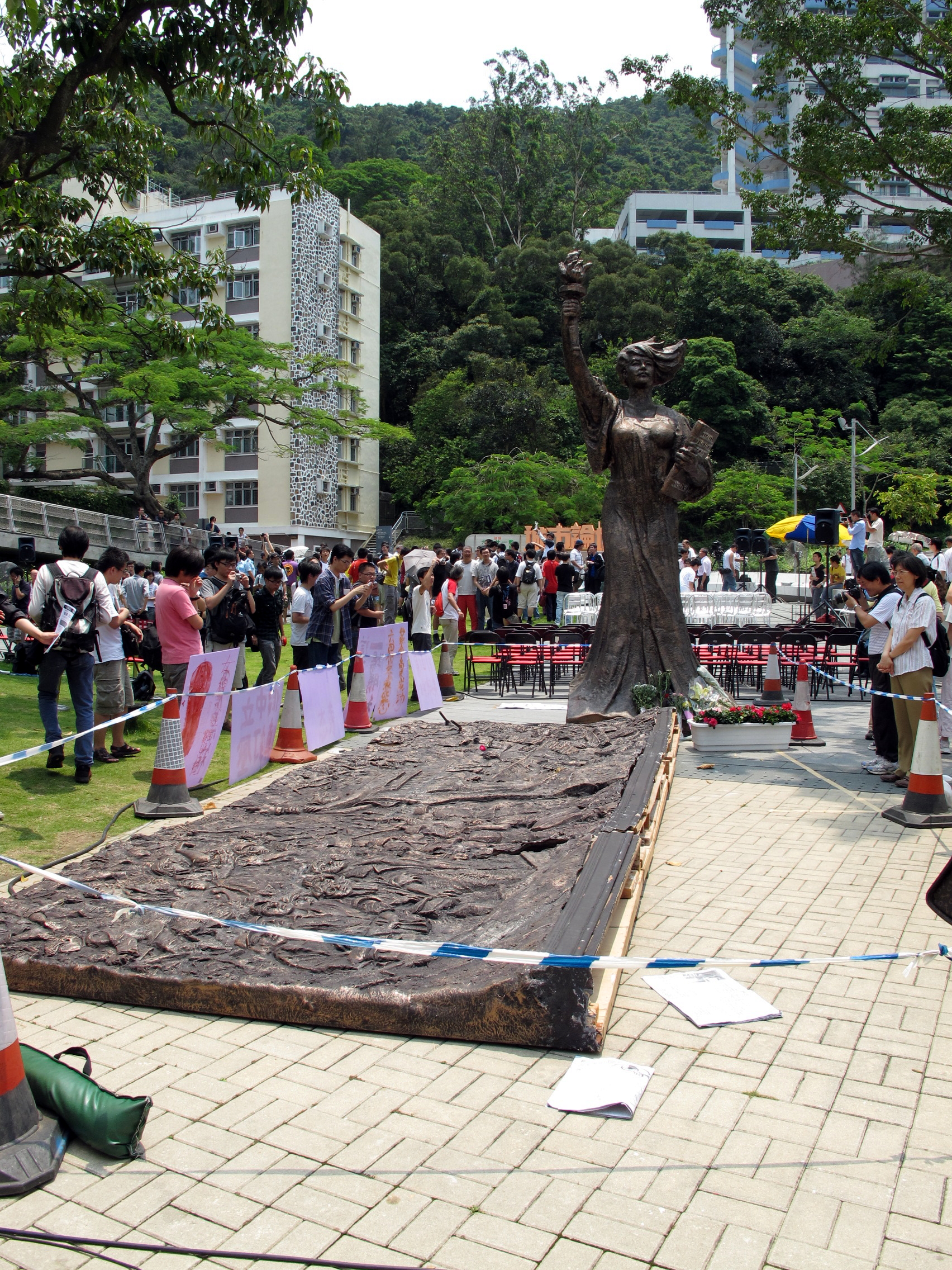
The Goddess and the accompanying relief at the Chinese University Shatin campus

"It was never the committee's intention to reject the request completely. We have thought about allowing some flexibility, such as putting the statue on the campus temporarily. But after the statement was issued, the students reacted very strongly and stopped talking to us. I agree that our handling of the matter was immature."

— Joseph Sung

An editorial in The Standard criticised the board's naivety in not anticipating the reaction from students and politicians. It was also highly critical that Sung had sought to distance himself from the decision with such a "lame excuse". Following Sung's remarks, outgoing vice-chancellor Lawrence Lau defended the committee's decision as "collective and unanimous", seemingly at odds with Sung's assertion the previous day that there were dissenting voices to the ban. He also disagreed with Sung's view that the decision taken was 'immature and inexperienced', as the matter had received 'detailed consideration'. The university attempted to soften the rift at the top with a statement from Sung that he acknowledged and agreed with the stance in the statement of rejecting the application, issued on 2 June but only "had different views on the wording." Apple Daily commented that the disquiet among board members over Sung's comments forced a hasty retraction; it suggested his lack of management's support, the result of internal politics and the power base cultivated by Lau, did not bode well for his authority. The students union pointed out to inconsistencies in the respective accounts of Lau and Sung, and said the two professors should have communicated to reach a consensus; Lau's reply "failed to explain why the school used political neutrality as a reason to reject the statue." The union said it had requested a meeting with the dean of students on Monday to seek talks with the governance team, but the request was rejected as the team had to deal with the public relations matters.

== 2014 protests ==
On the evening of 5 October 2014, protesters erected an umbrella-carrying male version of the Goddess at Tamar Square to represent the Umbrella Revolution.

== See also ==
- Goddess of Democracy
- Hong Kong Statue of Democracy
