= Huang Nan-hua =

Huang Nan-hua (黃南華; born c. 1958), also known as Huang Siu-ming (黃小明), is a Chinese man who planned to assassinate Hong Kong pro-democracy figure Martin Lee and media mogul Jimmy Lai in 2008.

== 2008 assassination attempt ==
In 2008, the 50-year-old Huang Nan-hua planned to assassinate Martin Lee and Jimmy Lai. On 14 August 2008 his plot was foiled by Hong Kong police when he was arrested with a hand gun with 5 rounds of bullets. He was intercepted while riding in a taxi.

== 2009 disclosure ==
A day before the 20th anniversary of the 1989 Tiananmen Square protests and massacre, leading Hong Kong democrat Martin Lee publicly disclosed Huang's plot. HK media mogul Jimmy Lai, a longtime critic of Beijing and owner of Apple Daily, also revealed he was a target of an assassination attempt.

== Sentencing ==
Huang was accused of plotting the shooting, and pleaded not guilty to the charge. A seven-member jury convicted Huang of one count of carrying arms and ammunition with intent to cause an arrestable offence. He was sentenced to 16 years in prison. The court decision was made in a five to two verdict.

A Hong Kong business man in Taiwan offered US$1 million to the assassins for the plot to get rid of Lee and Lai. Some of the other accomplices who attended Shenzhen Intermediate People's Court on July 22, 2009 included 66-year-old Tung Nga-man (童雅民), 60-year-old Chan Siu-ming (陳少明), and 62-year-old Yu Wai-shan (余偉珊).
