= 20th anniversary of the 1989 Tiananmen Square protests and massacre =

20th anniversary of Tiananmen Square protests of 1989
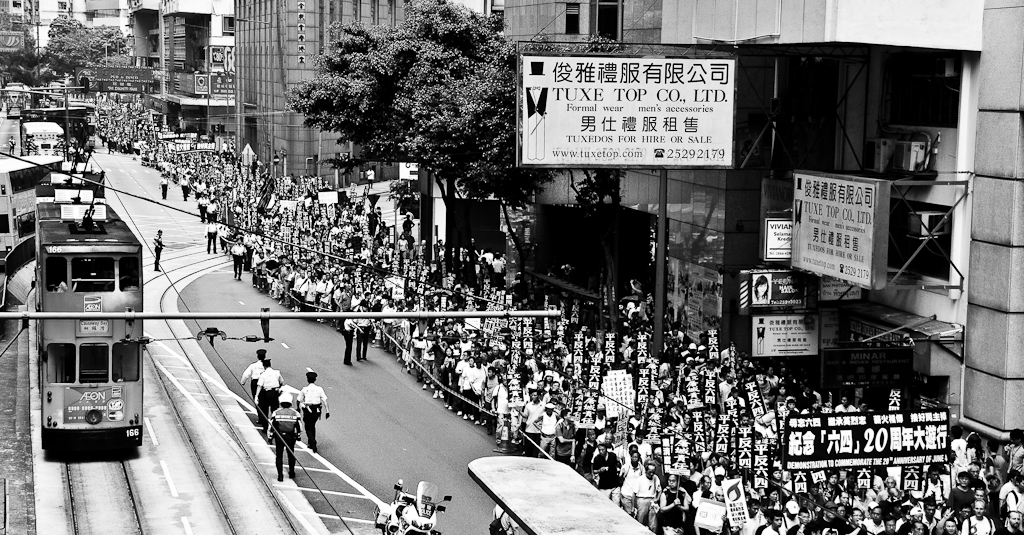
- Date: 4 June 2009
- Location: Hong Kong and Taiwan
- Participants: general public
- Outcome: protests, candlelight vigils

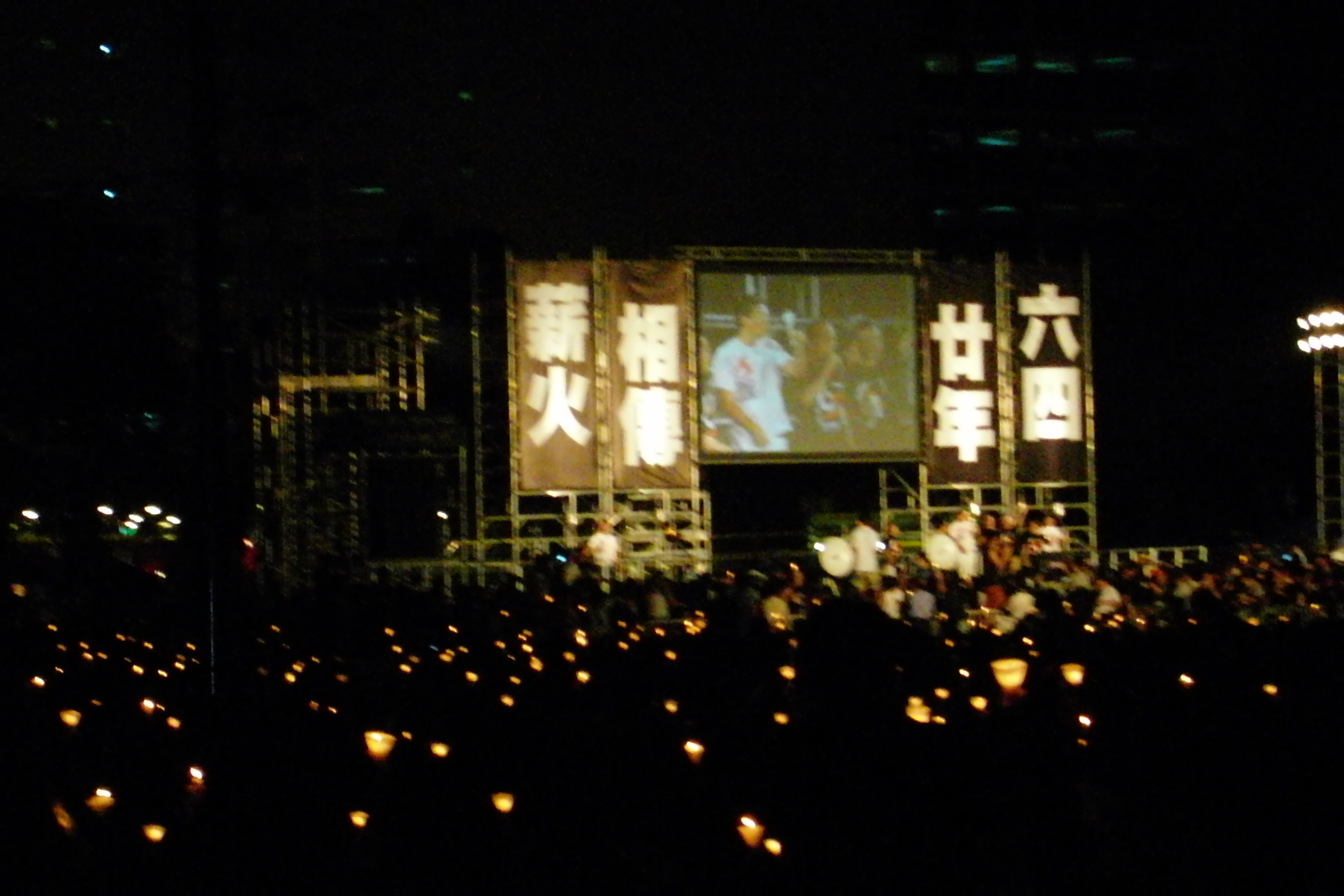
The candlelight vigil held in the Victoria Garden, Hong Kong, 4 June 2009

The 20th anniversary of the 1989 Tiananmen Square protests and massacre (20周年六四遊行) was a series of rallies that took place in late May to early June 2009 to commemorate the 20th anniversary of the 1989 Tiananmen Square protests and massacre, during which the Chinese government sent troops to suppress the pro-democracy movement. While the anniversary is remembered around the world; the event is heavily censored on Chinese soil, particularly in mainland China. Events which mark it only take place in Hong Kong, and in Macao to a much lesser extent.

== Background ==
In the Tiananmen Square protests of 1989, thousands of students and protests had gathered in Tiananmen Square, when troops opened fire. An unknown number of people were wounded or died in the massacre. As the People's Republic of China has publicly embraced the one country, two systems model of governance for Hong Kong, the annual 4 June observance which has become a tradition since 1989 has continued after the transfer of sovereignty from Britain to China. It is the only place on Chinese soil where the event is openly commemorated in any way and on any scale.

The 20th anniversary was commemorated in the backdrop of the release of Zhao Ziyangs memoirs to the public on 14 May 2009, entitled Prisoner of the State: The Secret Journal of Premier Zhao Ziyang. That same day, Chief Executive of Hong Kong, Donald Tsang spoke in the Legislative Council on a motion demanding vindication of the Tiananmen pro-democracy movement, Tsang said he believed 'Hong Kong people will make an objective assessment of the nation's development', after noting China's economic development. His claim that he was echoing the sentiments of Hong Kong people provoked a furore, for which he quickly apologised.

'I understand Hong Kong people's feelings about June 4, but the incident happened many years ago. The country's development in many areas has since achieved tremendous results and brought economic prosperity to Hong Kong. I believe Hong Kong people will make an objective assessment of the nation's development... My view represents the opinion of Hong Kong people in general, and the opinion of citizens has affected my view. What I have just said is how I feel about the views of the people of Hong Kong.'

— Donald Tsang, 14 May 2009, during a LegCo debate

One day before the protest march, news broke that there had been an alleged attempt on the lives of two leading political figures - leading Hong Kong democrat Martin Lee and media mogul Jimmy Lai. Lee publicly disclosed that an alleged assassin from the People's Republic of China and a HK accomplice had targeted him in 2008 after seizing a hand gun and ammunition. Jimmy Lai, a long-time critic of Beijing and the owner of Apple Daily, revealed he was also the target of the assassination attempt. The plot was foiled when police arrested 50-year-old would-be assassin Huang Nan-hua on 14 August 2008. Lee himself said, had the attempt succeeded, it would have been the worst possible nightmare for the Chinese Communist Party, which wouldn't have known how to handle the situation.

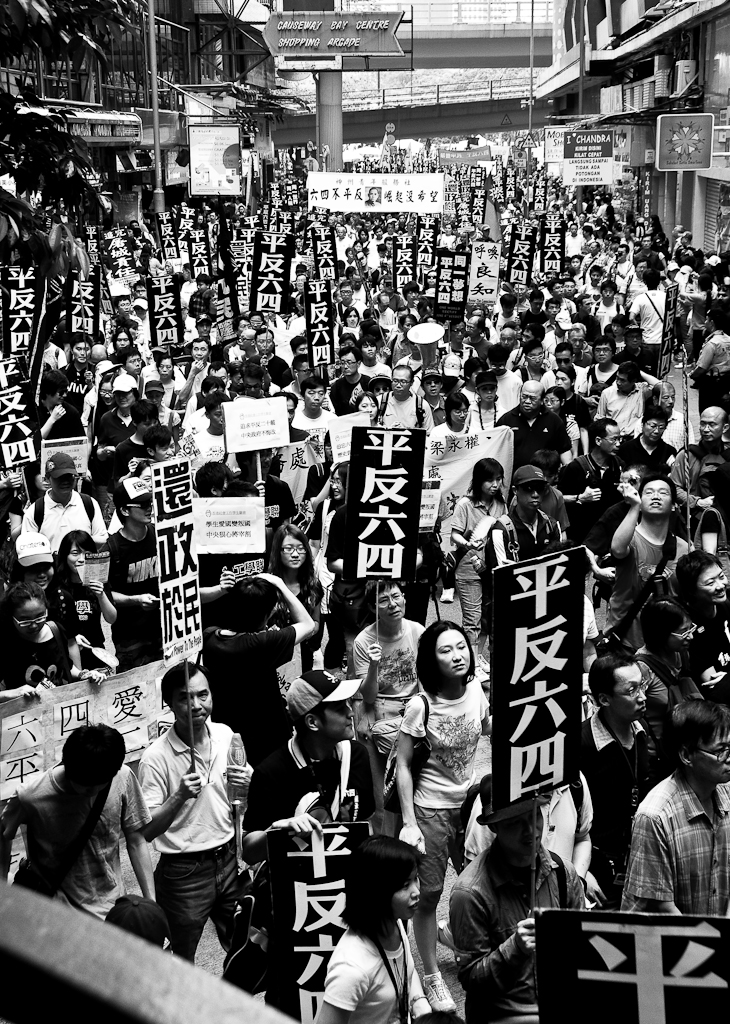
Marchers passing through Causeway Bay after leaving Victoria Park

=== Denied entry to Hong Kong ===
The BBC's correspondent reported that the local authorities did stop some of the Tiananmen exiles coming into Hong Kong to please Beijing. The media reported that three former Tiananmen student protesters have been denied visas to attend a panel discussion marking the anniversary at City University of Hong Kong, taking place from 2–3 June – Wang Dan and Wang Juntao were denied visas when they applied at Chinese consulates; Yang Jianli was denied entry at Hong Kong airport three weeks previously. Jens Galschiøt, who sculptured the Pillar of Shame now located on the campus of Hong Kong University, was not allowed into Hong Kong.

'Being used for internal reference, the list is not made public and it is not a blacklist. Immigration will conduct examinations and consider each case individually before deciding whether the concerned persons should be allowed entry.'

— Ambrose Lee, Secretary for Security, 3 June 2009

Xiang Xiaoji, a former student leader of the '89 protests, was also refused entry. The Hong Kong Immigration Department denied keeping a blacklist, but admitted to a 'surveillance list'. Wuerkaixi, a student activist, was also barred from entering Macau. Pro-democracy legislator Lee Cheuk-yan said it was crucial that the city continued to mark the events of 20 years ago as it was the only place on Chinese soil that can commemorate the event.

== Mainland China ==
The 1989 protest is still considered a counter-revolutionary riot by the Chinese Communist Party, and remains taboo.

The New York Times reported that the Communist Party established a top-level committee charged with ensuring social stability during the period of sensitive anniversaries. The committee is rumoured to be led by Xi Jinping and nicknamed "6521 Project" – supposedly in reference to the 60th anniversary of the founding of the PRC, the 50th anniversary of the 1959 Tibetan uprising, the 20th anniversary of the Tiananmen Square protests, and the 10th anniversary of the banning of the Falun Gong. The project established branches at every level of government, and was carried out in part through increased surveillance of potential dissidents. Among those who had been arrested were several human rights lawyers who had signed Charter 08 – including Tang Jitian, Lan Xuezhi, and Pu Zhiqiang; Jiang Tianyong, Li Heping, Li Xiongbing and Li Fangping were put under surveillance. The Standard reported a huge security presence in Tiananmen, and all around Beijing, as the authorities remained determined to prevent any commemoration of the mass slaughter twenty years previously. Simpson said that the People's Armed Police and Public Security Bureau were backed up by thousands more uniformed police and para-military officers in the square; armoured divisions of the People's Liberation Army remained on standby inside nearby garrisons. The BBC reported that police sealed off Tiananmen Square in Beijing for the anniversary, with foreign journalists barred from the area. At the diplomatic level, China rejected a US call to investigate the massacre, and accused Washington of "political prejudices".

=== Internet ===
Coinciding with the twentieth anniversary, the PRC government ordered Internet portals, fora and discussion groups to shut down their servers for maintenance between 3 and 6 June. Twitter and Microsoft Hotmail were blocked across the mainland two days before the 20th anniversary of the Tiananmen Square crackdown; others said Microsoft's Windows Live and Flickr were also inaccessible.

In order to improve the internet content and provide a healthy environment for our netizens, we have designated 3 to 6 June as the national server maintenance day. This move is widely supported by the public

— Chinese censors, South China Morning Post

The Guardian reported that in excess of 300 Chinese sites had "posted increasingly blasé maintenance messages on the anniversary". A number of websites, such as Fanfou and WordKu.com, made a veiled protest at state censorship by referring to the date sarcastically as "Chinese Internet Maintenance Day". Chinese users of Twitter, Hotmail and Flickr, among others, reported a widespread service disruptions the day before the shut-downs.

== Legislative Council motion ==
The motion to vindicate the 1989 Tiananmen protesters failed as they did not secure a majority in both functional and geographical constituencies. Twenty-three votes were cast in favour. The nine DAB legislators, three from the FTU, Philip Wong, Lau Wong-fat, Chim Pui-chung and Regina Ip voted against. There were eleven abstentions and nine were absent. No government officials attended the debate; none of the legislators from the Democratic Alliance for the Betterment and Progress of Hong Kong, spoke on the motion before casting their opposing vote. However, a minor breakthrough occurred when independent medical representative Leung Ka-lau voted to support the motion; that another non-affiliated lawmaker Paul Chan Mo-po (accountancy) joined the democrats in observing a minute's silence during the debate was also described as a ground-breaking. Chim Pui-chung from the financial sector said China might have disintegrated like the Soviet Union had Beijing not taken a hard line. Three other amendments moved by pan-democrats - one demanding the inclusion of the protests and massacre in school history books and another expressing regret about recent remarks on the issue by Donald Tsang - also failed. As a measure of its sensitive nature and notwithstanding a sharp rise in public opinion in favour of an official vindication, the loyalist DAB refused to comment on the protests and massacre; at a Legco House Committee meeting ten days prior to the LegCo debate, Chief Secretary Henry Tang also refused to comment when asked by lawmakers.

== March and candlelight vigil ==
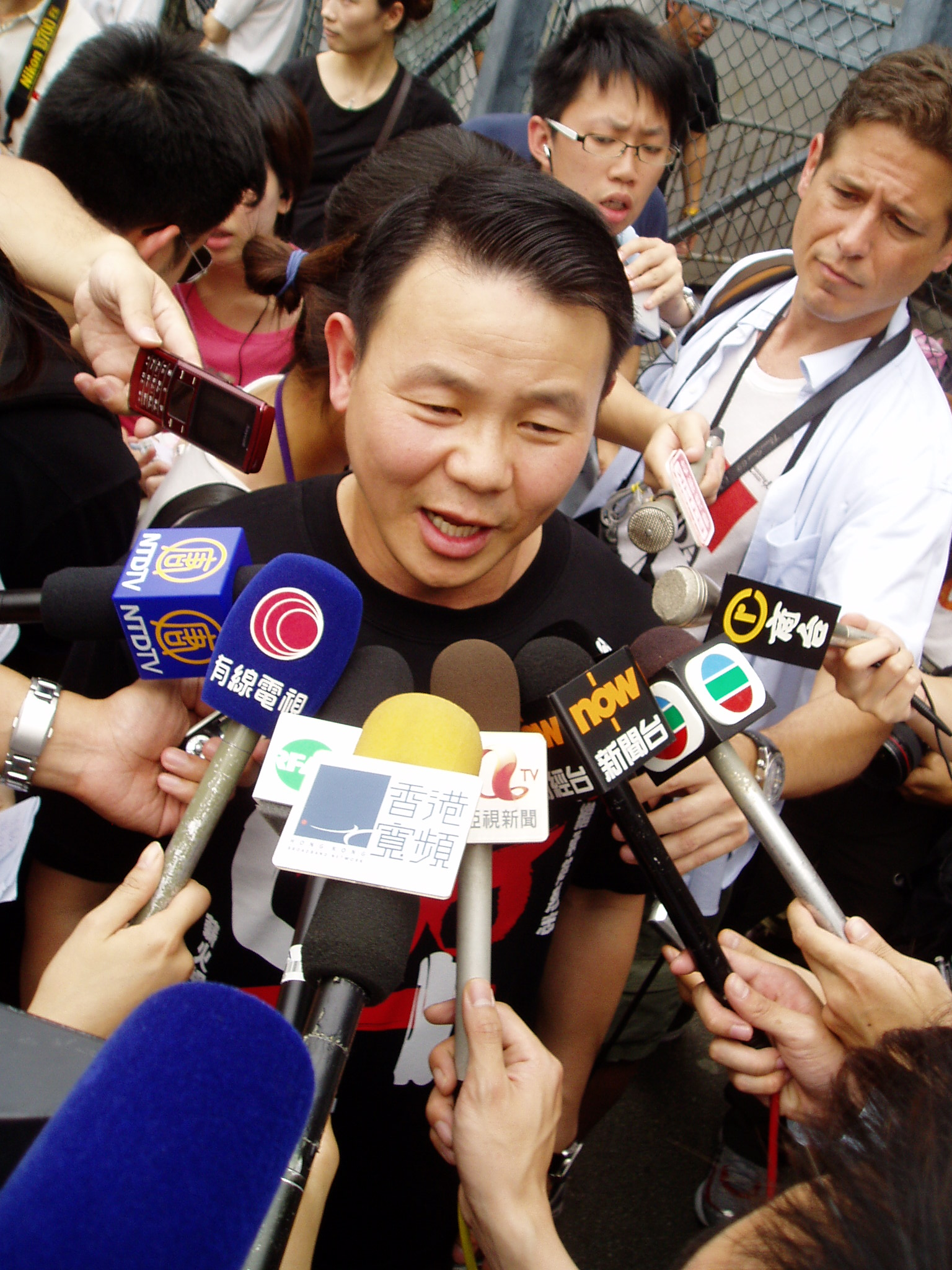
Xiong Yan being interviewed on 31 May

The march which took place on 31 May 2009 followed the traditional route from Victoria Park to Government Offices in Central, led by 20 youngsters born in 1989. Pro-democratic groups such as the Hong Kong Alliance in Support of Patriotic Democratic Movements in China said 8,000 people participated; the police estimated 4,700. Organisers said around 5,000 people rallied.

Xiong Yan, a former student leader of the 1989 protest who was jailed and arrested, was able to set foot on Chinese soil for the first time in 17 years to participate in the rally. The Hong Kong Federation of Students staged a 64-hour hunger strike in Times Square the afternoon following the march, demanding the vindication of the Tiananmen protesters. President of Taiwan, Ma Ying-jeou said "this painful period of history must be faced with courage and cannot be intentionally ducked."

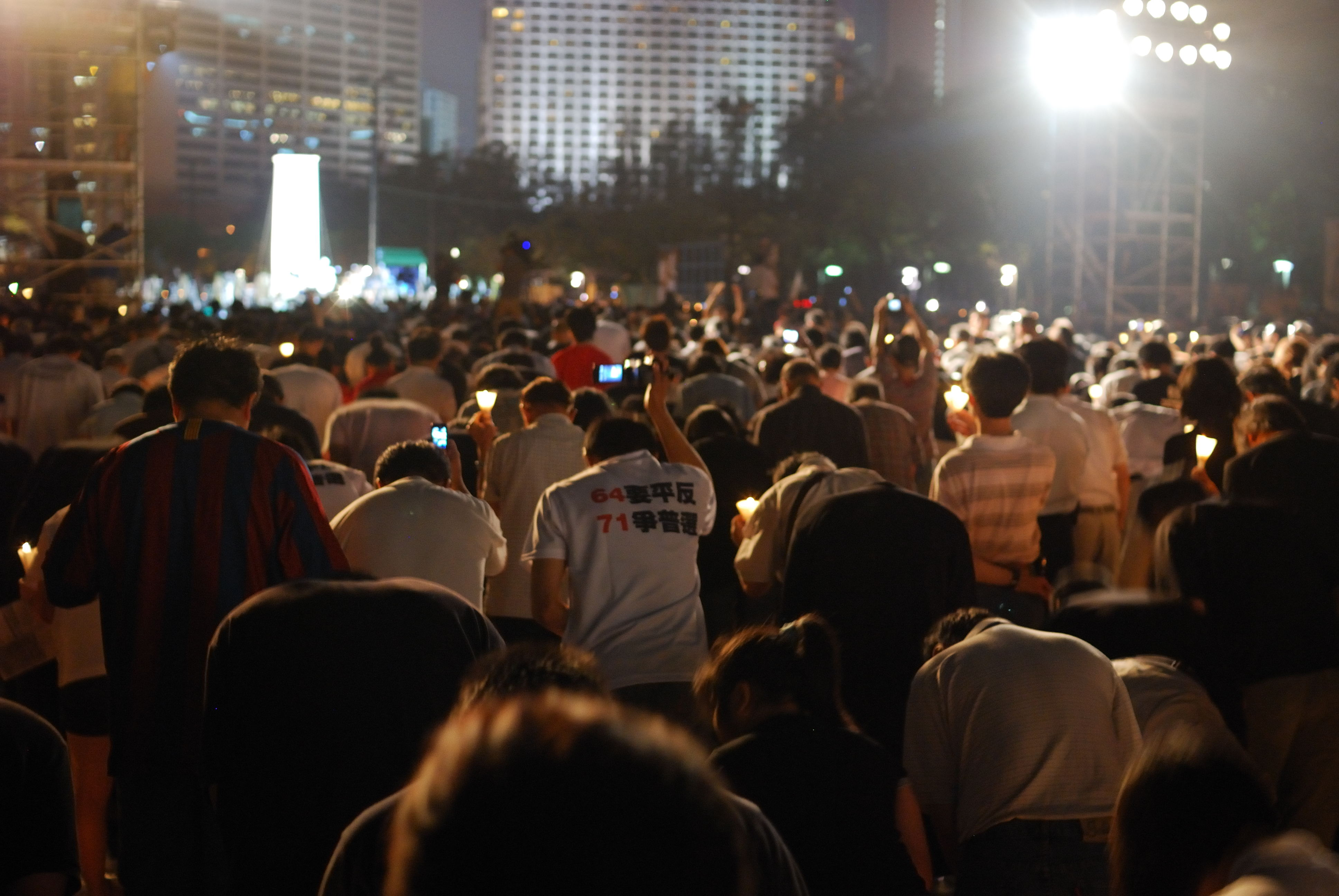
A candlelight vigil held 4 days after the procession

At Hong Kong Victoria Park candlelight vigil was followed on 4 June 2009. Organisers estimated its size at 150,000, plus another 50,000 who cannot fit inside the park. This is the largest turnout ever in 20 years. Police put the number at 62,800.

At the vigil, Xiong Yan gave a speech in which he hailed Hong Kong people as "the pride of all Chinese" - for daring to defend freedom; excerpts from the memoirs recorded by late Communist Party secretary general and democracy-movement sympathiser Zhao Ziyang were played, as was a recorded message from Ding Zilin, leader of the Tiananmen Mothers group of bereaved parents. The public jeered when an image of Chief Executive Donald Tsang was shown on giant screens next to that of former hard-line premier Li Peng.

== See also ==
- 21st anniversary of the 1989 Tiananmen Square protests and massacre
- Memorials for the 1989 Tiananmen Square protests and massacre
- Hong Kong 1 July marches
