= Death of Li Wangyang =

2012 death of a Chinese dissident

Li Wangyang 李旺阳
- Still from a TV interview of Li Wangyang in June 2012
- Born: 12 November 1950; Hunan, China
- Died: 6 June 2012 (aged 61); Shaoyang, Hunan, PRC
- Occupations: glass worker; political activist

Li Wangyang (Chinese: 李旺阳; pinyin: Lǐ Wàngyáng, 12 November 1950 – 6 June 2012) was a Chinese dissident labor rights activist, member of the Workers Autonomous Federation and chairman of the Shaoyang WAF branch. Following his role in the Tiananmen Square protests of 1989, he served twenty-one years in prison on charges of counterrevolutionary propaganda, incitement, and subversion. Of all Chinese pro-democracy activists from 1989, Li spent the longest time in prison. On 6 June 2012, one year after his release from prison, and a few days after a television interview in which he continued to call for vindication of the Tiananmen Square protests, Li was found hanged in a hospital room. Shaoyang city authorities initially claimed suicide was the cause of death, but it was revised to 'accidental death' after the autopsy.

Following a protest march attended by up to 25,000 people, Pan Democrats and senior establishment figures in Hong Kong publicly commented on the suspicious nature of the death, and said they had escalated the demands of citizens to politicians or "relevant departments" at national level for an independent investigation. The uproar in Hong Kong is said by commentators to have put pressure on mainland authorities to order a criminal investigation so as not to overshadow the impending visit of Chinese Communist Party general secretary Hu Jintao for the 15th anniversary celebrations of the handover of Hong Kong.

== Protests and imprisonment ==
A worker in a glass factory, Li Wangyang set up a labour union under inspiration of the Democracy Wall in 1983. In 1989, China saw mass pro-democracy protests throughout the country, with the largest protests in Tiananmen Square, Beijing. After hundreds died when the People's Liberation Army suppressed the protests on 4 June, Li pasted a poster on a Shaoyang traffic sign urging a general strike in support of the protests. Two days later, Li organized a memorial for the victims.

As a result of his actions, Li was jailed on 9 June for "counterrevolutionary propaganda and incitement". He was sentenced to ten years of imprisonment, but his sentence was increased to thirteen years when he appealed to the court. He was also sentenced to hard labour. As his health deteriorated, he was granted medical parole in June 1996, but the authorities cancelled his release after Deng Xiaoping died in 1997, fearing calls for the other responsible officials to be held to account for the 4 June Massacre. In June 2000 Li was released again for reasons of poor health. Human Rights in China (HRIC) alleged that Li was tortured while in custody, resulting in his losing both his sight and hearing. Li himself said in his last interview that the only explanation for his becoming blind was through nerve damage caused by being repeatedly beaten about the head.

During his spells in prison, Li was a frequent inmate in solitary confinement. In 2001, Li began a hunger strike as part of a petition to authorities to repay his health care costs, and was given an additional ten-year sentence for "inciting subversion". Whilst attempting to force feed Li during his hunger strike, guards knocked out Li's front teeth. He finally gained freedom in May 2011, when he checked into Daxiang District Hospital to treat his medical conditions. His sister, who lived 7 km away from the hospital, visited him twice a day with his meals.

Li remained vocal in demanding vindication of the Tiananmen protesters up until his death: in an interview with i-CABLE broadcast four days before, he said "the souls of the martyrs deserve to finally find some peace". He advocated a multi-party democracy for his country, and said he did not regret his fight for a better China, "even had [he] been beheaded". In another interview, broadcast on French radio the eve of the 23rd anniversary of the Tiananmen Square crackdown, he appealed to his compatriots "to observe 6-4". Amnesty International designated him a prisoner of conscience. Apple Daily reported that he had no minders before the interviews. After his interviews were broadcast, Li was kept under around the clock surveillance by a team of 10 police officers. An account that was opened to receive donations from supporters from China and abroad to pay his medical fees was inexplicably blocked; he was also severely impeded from going to Beijing to see a specialist physician.

== Death ==
Li was found dead on 6 June 2012, one year after his latest release from prison, in the Daxiang Hospital where he was being treated for heart disease and diabetes. Li was reportedly found on his feet with a strip of cloth tied around his neck and connected to a window bar. Li's next of kin, his sister Li Wangling and her husband Zhao Baozhu, rushed to the hospital shortly after they were telephoned at 6 am. His brother-in-law said that the body was "on its feet next to his bed, with a white strip of cloth tied tightly around its neck and connected to a window bar above". The authorities said to relatives that there would be an autopsy. Although the latter were denied permission to take photographs, some stills and one video made it onto the internet. Later, i-Cable television in Hong Kong reported that officials had been attempting to persuade Li's family members to cremate his body immediately.

=== Domestic reaction ===
Official statements that Li had committed suicide caused "outrage" among China's dissident community, as his family questioned how Li would have been capable of killing himself. They said that leaving aside his minders, Li was blind and nearly deaf and could "barely hold a bowl without his hands shaking". Friends and local activists strongly allege that Li "was suicided" (被自殺), and formed a 'Committee in quest of the truth about Li's death'. The Wall Street Journal commented that Chinese activists on Twitter had begun to tweet their own declarations that they had no plans to commit suicide (#我不自杀); dissident Hu Jia recommended that fellow dissidents who are frequently arrested and political prisoners prepare a notarised statement declaring one's lack of intention to commit suicide. To avoid internet censorship, "suicided" became a web-search term of choice.

HRIC said Li's sister had been detained by police and was taken to a hotel where they were being held. Media reported that Li's family was under pressure to consent to an autopsy, and that police had given an ultimatum of noon on 8 June. Family members were denied access to the body since police removed it from the hospital. The Information Centre for Human Rights and Democracy conveyed that Li's next of kin were prepared to grant an autopsy subject to the presence of a lawyer from outside Shaoyang. On 8 June, an autopsy of Li's body was carried out by authorities in Shaoyang, apparently against the wishes of his family, and the body was cremated on 9 June. According to the Information Centre for Human Rights and Democracy, an unnamed member of staff at a funeral parlour implied that the government ordered the cremation; another worker told Cable TV that Li's sister and brother-in-law had given signed consent.

According to Shaoyang city authorities, people on Li's wards saw him "acting strangely" by the window at around 3 am on the day he died. "Surveillance camera footage showed that on the night Li Wangyang died, no suspicious persons entered the ward except Li's wardmates and hospital staff ... The ward's door was not forced open", and there were no other bruises on his body.

Shaoyang city authorities said the autopsy was conducted by four pathologists from Sun Yat-sen University on 8 June. It is claimed that the entire process was videotaped and in the presence of the media, members of the National People's Congress and the Chinese People's Political Consultative Conference. The university is expected to report the autopsy within four days. The city continued to assert that Li committed suicide, that his body was cremated at his family's request, and that his ashes were buried under the supervision of his sister and brother-in-law. The media made a connection to the Wukan protests, pointing out the medical examiner assigned to perform Li's autopsy was the same person who pronounced that Xue Jingbo had died of "cardiac failure".

=== International response ===
By the day following news of Li's demise, over 2,700 people, including dissident Ai Weiwei, had signed an online petition calling for an independent investigation. Human rights activist and lawyer Teng Biao posted a picture of a calligraphy scroll which read "An inch of blood for an inch of freedom, thousands of miles of rivers bring thousands of miles of woes" to his Twitter account, dedicating the post to Li. The Information Centre for Human Rights and Democracy raised the possibility that "security guards monitoring him tortured him to death and faked a suicide". Amnesty International issued a statement urging the Chinese government to "thoroughly investigate the circumstances surrounding Li Wangyang's death and take seriously the claims made by his family and friends that this was not suicide". At the request of the Hong Kong Confederation of Trade Unions (HKCTU), LabourStart launched a global online campaign demanding that the Chinese government open an investigation.

=== Response in Hong Kong ===
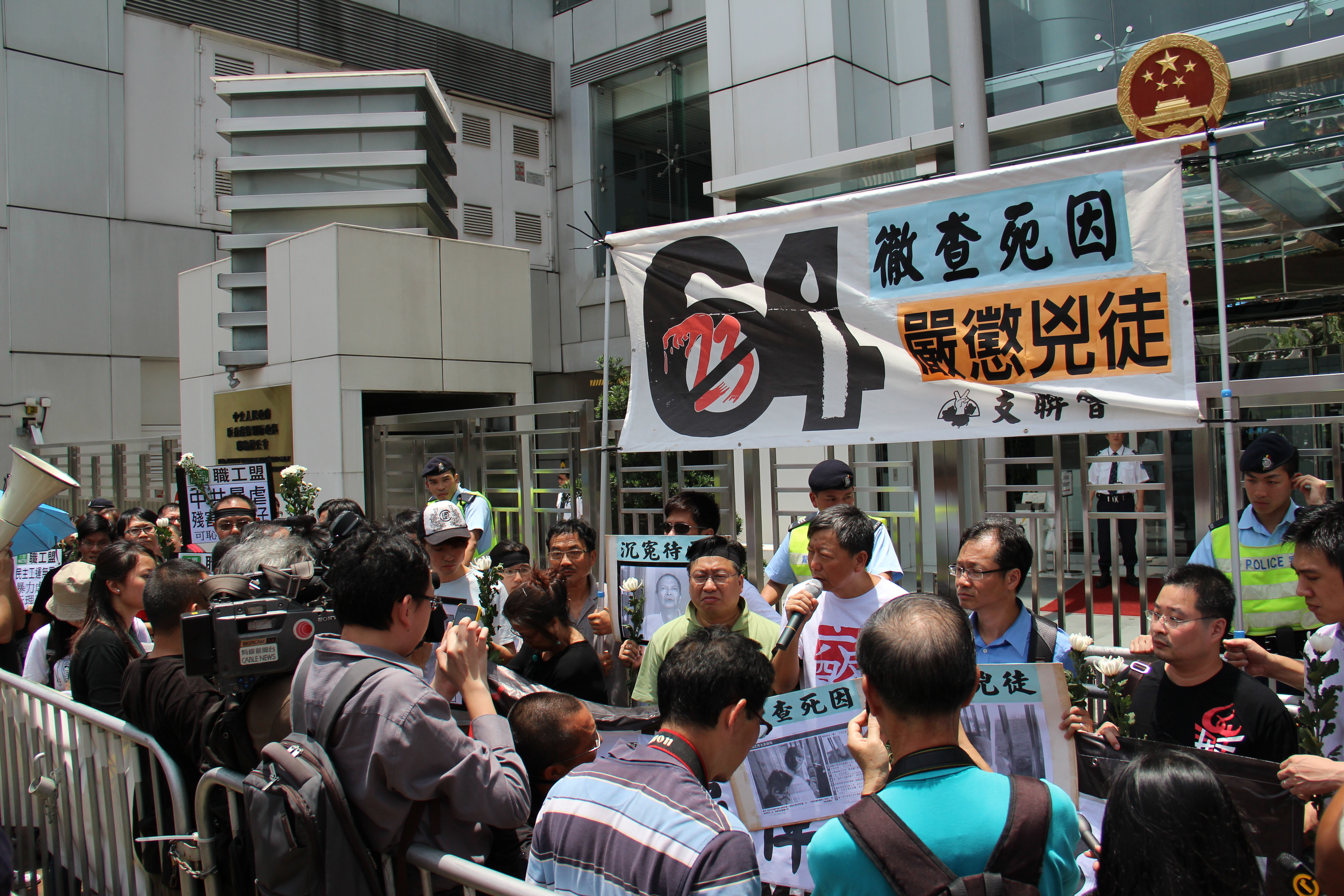
On 7 June, several Hong Kong organisations protested outside the Central Government Liaison Office.

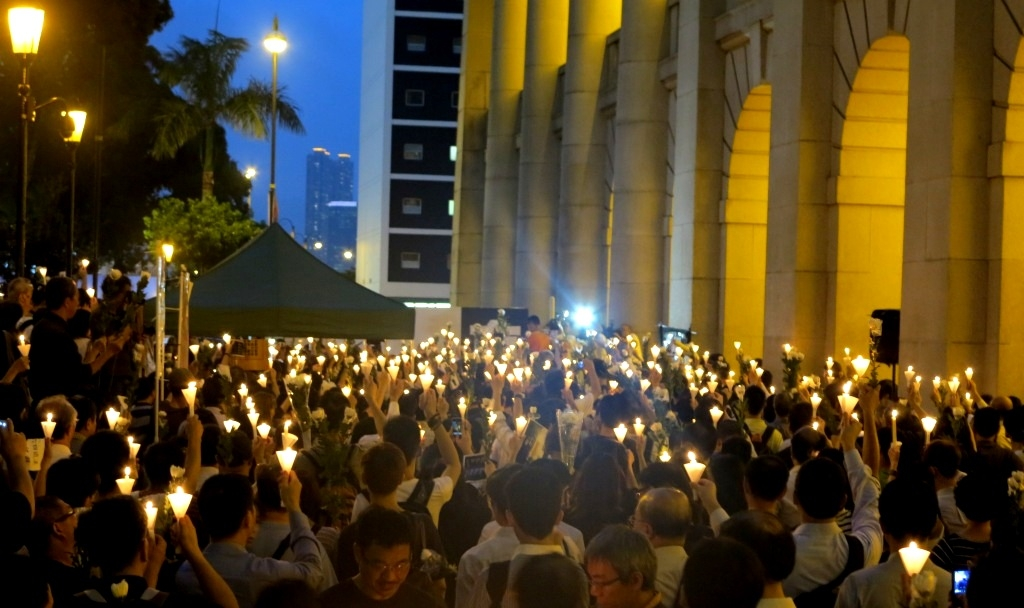
A candlelight vigil was held to commemorate the seventh day of Li's death.

The death and its subsequent handling angered and sent shock waves through Hong Kong. The Hong Kong Alliance in Support of Patriotic Democratic Movements of China rebuked claims that Li died of suicide. Its convener, Lee Cheuk-yan argued that Li never regretted support for democracy in the course of his imprisonment, and that his poor health condition did not allow him to hang himself under surveillance of National Security Guards. Kinseng Lam, who gave Li the last interview, called it an assassination and believed it was his interview that triggered the authorities to kill him. Alan Leong, Civic Party legislator in Hong Kong, suggested Li 'paid the price' for his interview with iCable TV. Several representatives to the National People's Congress (NPC), including Liberal Party chairman Miriam Lau, Maria Tam, Michael Tien, called on the central government to look into the case. Several staunchly pro-establishment legislators argued against escalating the issue to Beijing. Wong Kwok-kin argued that such incidents were "daily occurrences" and that it would be impractical to have them all investigated. Notably, Ip Kwok-him of the DAB initially said it was "unnecessary" to write to air his concerns, because Chinese People's Political Consultative Conference (CPPCC) members should not tell the authorities how to conduct their affairs. Ip later made a U-turn owing to public pressure. At City Forum, CPPCC member Lew Mon-hung said he would immediately write to the CPPCC regarding the death under bizarre circumstances. He opined that for a man to be killed under guise of protecting social stability would be complete denial of human rights. Nevertheless, he defended the Central government, saying it was still uncertain whether Li's death was a suicide or a homicide.

According to organisers of the march on 10 June, in Hong Kong to demand a thorough investigation into Li's death, 25,000 people attended the largest-scale protest ever at the main entrance of the Central Government Liaison Office; Police estimated the turnout at 5,400. On 13 June 1500 people attended a candlelight vigil held outside the former Legislative Council Building commemorating the seventh day of Li's death.

Editorials in the main newspapers all referred to Li's death as "suspicious", and said ongoing publicity about the case was unfavourable to China's image, and that it was in China's interests for the death to be probed transparently by central authorities. An opinion piece in the Hong Kong Economic Journal said Li's death stoked the anger of the Hong Kong people and brought up to 25,000 people onto the streets. "It not only reopened the wounds of the Tiananmen protests; the ridiculous claims that he committed suicide was a travesty of the rule of law". The writer lamented that despite China's rise, she still languished third from last in world rankings in terms of respect for human rights. In a piece translated and published in the South China Morning Post, Chang Ping wrote that Li's death "exposed the relationship between the June 4 crackdown and the Chinese government's policy to 'maintain stability' ... [which] becomes the priority that overrides all. June 4 became the government's model for dealing with any dissent, using extreme force."

Wang Xiangwei, the newly appointed editor-in-Chief of the South China Morning Post was criticised for his decision to reduce paper's coverage of Li' death on 7 June. Wang reportedly reversed the decision to run a full story, and instead published a two-paragraph report inside the paper; other news media reported it prominently. A senior staff member who sought to understand the decision received a stern rebuff by return email from Wang. Self-censorship concerns were raised in the Chinese-language press of the territory because Wang is mainland born, and is a member of the Jilin Provincial CPPCC. Other than on the first day, Li's death and aftermath was covered in the Post as major news stories. On 21 June, responding to news of alleged downplaying of Li's case, Wang said he understood the "huge responsibility to deliver news... [and]... the journalistic heritage we have inherited". He said that his decision not to pursue extensive coverage as the story broke was pending "more facts and details surrounding the circumstances of this case".

Outgoing Health Secretary York Chow was the first minister to express scepticism of the 'suicide' claim; then others followed suit. Former Legco president and National People's Congress Standing Committee member Rita Fan noted the doubts of the public in Hong Kong over the death of Li. She said that "If these doubts can be resolved, and if some people are held responsible, Hong Kong people will have a better impression of the country." She added that "Matters like these happen because the officials do not value the lives of the people, do not respect the rights of the people … do not have an in-depth understanding of accountability to the people." Chief Executive-elect, CY Leung maintained his refusal to directly comment on Li's death, which was universally hailed as "suspicious". Many local pro-establishment politicians said they had escalated the matter to various Communist Party officials or bodies.

Nine days after the death, outgoing Chief Executive Donald Tsang expressed doubts about Li's case, said he understood the views of Hong Kong people. He said: "Under the principle of 'one country, two systems', the most important responsibility for a chief executive is to safeguard the freedoms of speech and expression of Hong Kong people"; Chief Executive-elect CY Leung said he shared the feelings of fellow citizens about the issue. On 16 June, Leung observed a minute's silence in honour of Li at a function, but maintained that it would be "inappropriate" for him to comment on the death.

=== Macao ===
Pro-democracy Macanese legislators Chan Wai Chi, Au Kam San and Ng Kuok Cheong wrote to PRC Premier Wen Jiabao and other deputies to the Chinese People's National Congress demanding an investigation of Li's mysterious "suicide". They protested the Shaoyang public security office ignoring escalating calls for a transparent investigation Li's death, and accused them of "destroying the evidence" by cremating Li's body.

== Hunan investigation ==
Following the public outcry, Li Gang, deputy director of the Hong Kong–central government liaison office in said that Hunan Public Security Bureau ordered a criminal investigation into the death. Li said: "We have noted the concern expressed by the Hong Kong community and media on [Li Wangyang's death]. We have reflected their concerns to the relevant departments in the central government." The South China Morning Post noted that announcement about the forensic and criminal investigation by experts from outside Hunan province came through the semi-official Hong Kong China News Agency rather than Xinhua, saying it indicated that the announcement was targeted at Hong Kong, designed to calm public anger. Pundits said the uproar in Hong Kong had put pressure on mainland authorities to order a criminal investigation so as not to threaten the legacy of outgoing CCP general secretary Hu Jintao and overshadow his impending visit for the 15th anniversary celebrations of the handover of Hong Kong. Political commentator Johnny Lau said that if Hu had not been planning on coming to Hong Kong, "the case could drag on or may be forgotten".

== Legacy ==
On 6 June 2018, a sculpture for Li Wangyang was unveiled at the Liberty Sculpture Park in Yermo, California, the sculpture is 6 meters in total height, it was finished under a project in three months.

On 27 May 2022, a bust of Li Wangyang was unveiled in Béziers, France.
