= Freedom of the press in Hong Kong =

Freedom of the press in Hong Kong is the right to gather, report on, publish and issue news, protected under the Hong Kong Basic Law.

Multiple media groups were no longer able to publish or issue news after the passing and implementation of the 2020 Hong Kong national security law.

== Indexes ==
This is a historical list of Hong Kong's rankings and scores in RSF's World Press Freedom Index and Hong Kong Journalists Association (HKJA)'s Press Freedom Index.

Year	RSF Ranking	Total no. of assessed areas	RSF Score	HKJA Score, Public	HKJA Score, Journalists
2002	18	139	N/A	(Not Assessed)	
2007	61	169	N/A	(Not Assessed)	
2013	58	179	73.84	49.4	42
2017	73	179	70.54	47.1	40.3
2018	70	180	70.96	45	40.9
2019	73	180	70.35	41.9	36.2
2020	80	180	69.99	42.6	32.1
2021	80	180	69.56	42	26.2
2022	148	180	41.64	41.4	25.7
2023	140	180	44.86	42.2	25
2024	135	180	43.06	(Not assessed)	28.9
2025	140	180	39.86	(Not assessed)	28.9

Hong Kong ranked the 70th out of all 180 surveyed areas in April 2018, a rating significantly better than that of China Mainland's (176th) and worse than Taiwan’s (42nd). The report attributed Hong Kong's rating to low and infrequent violence against journalists, rising prominence of online journalism, their recognition by the Hong Kong government, and organised resistance to Beijing's influence of said journalistic media.

Rank declined slightly to the 73rd place in 2019, attributed by the report to "leading traditional media [receiving] pressure to comply with Beijing’s dictates," citing Victor Mallet's visa controversy and the passing of 2019 Hong Kong Extradition Bill as events threatening journalistic freedom and independence.

Hong Kong suffered the worst decline amongst all assessed areas in 2022’s Press Freedom ranking, dropping to the 148th place from previous year's 80th.

== History ==
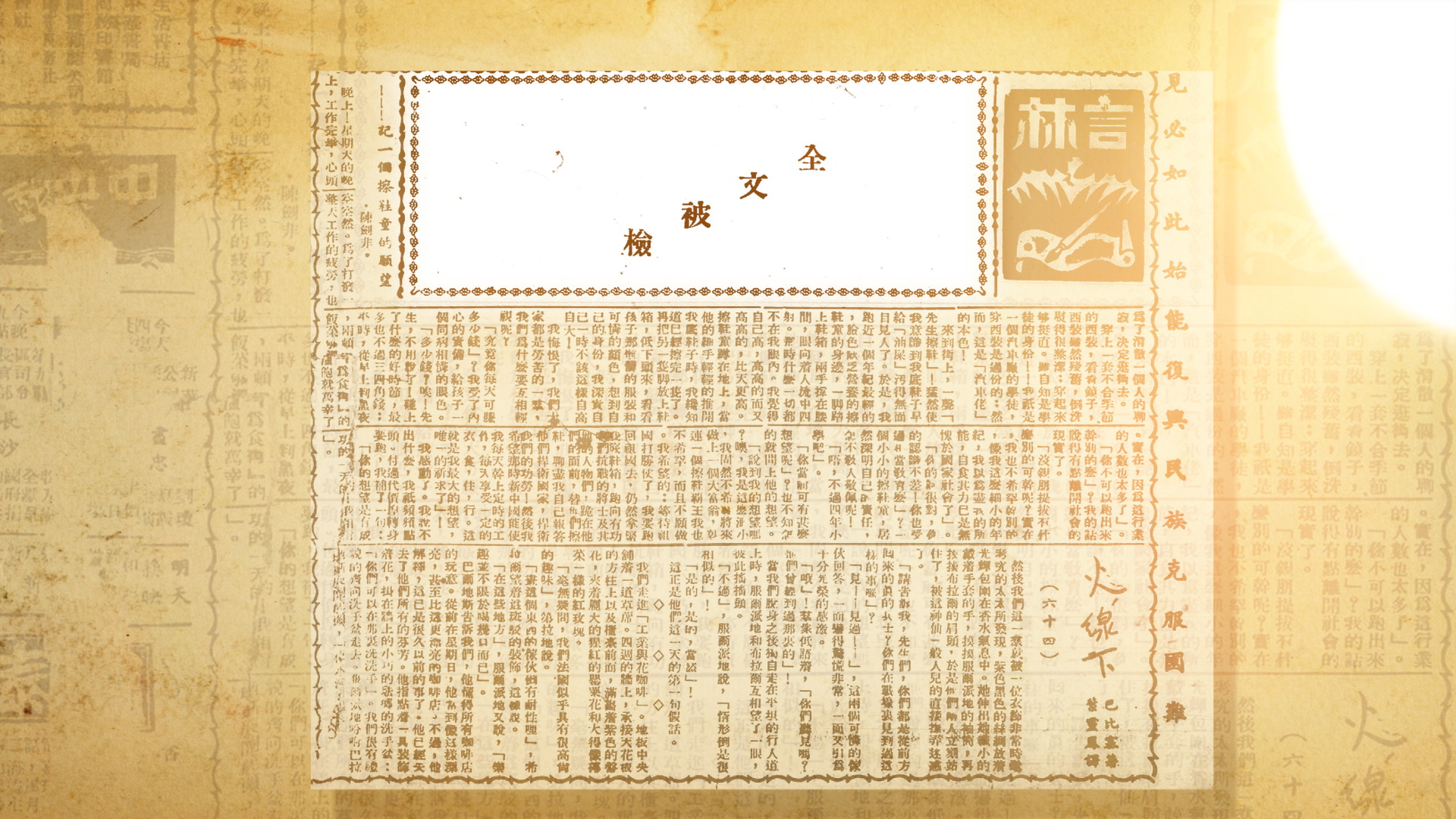
Newspaper with an entire section censored and replaced with 全文被檢 lit. 'whole article censored', 1937.

One of the early record of government prosecution against the media is the 1858 suing of W. Jarrant, the owner of newspaper The Friend Of China, for alleged defamation.

The government banned news articles with anti-Qing sentiment in 1907 - Qing being the imperial and feudalist government of China at the time.

Censorship departments were set up against newspapers publishing in Chinese language during the Canton-Hong Kong strike in 1925.

The Communist Party's newspaper 香港小日报 lit. 'Hong Kong Daily Tabloids' was seized twice in 1929 and 1930 during the Chinese Civil War, eventually ceasing its publication.

Anti-Japanese sentiments and its related phrases were censored after outbreak of the Second Sino-Japanese War in 1937. Chinese phrases including lit. 'Japs', 'enemies', and 'traitors' were also censored on a keyword basis.

=== Legal actions and controversies involving foreign media ===
In July 2024, The Wall Street Journal terminated reporter Selina Cheng shortly after she was elected chair of the Hong Kong Journalists Association (HKJA). Cheng stated that senior management at the newspaper had pressured her to withdraw from the union election, claiming the role was incompatible with her position at the publication, and dismissed her when she refused. The incident drew criticism from international media observers and press freedom organizations, including Human Rights Watch, Reporters Without Borders, the Foreign Correspondents' Club of China, the NewsGuild, and the Faculty of Columbia Journalism School.

Following her dismissal, Cheng launched a private prosecution in Hong Kong's Eastern Magistrates' Courts against the publisher, Dow Jones Publishing Co (Asia) Inc., alleging violations of local labor laws regarding trade union protections. Cheng was represented by Senior Counsel Nigel Kat and barrister Nicklaus Pannu-Yuon, with solicitor Adam Paul Clermont as instructing solicitor.

On September 10, 2026, Principal Magistrate David Cheung convicted Dow Jones under the Employment Ordinance for attempting to deter an employee from exercising trade union rights. The court acquitted the company on a separate charge of unlawful dismissal, citing reasonable doubt as to whether the termination was directly linked to her union role or a broader internal corporate restructuring.
