= 6521 Project =

Working group of the Chinese Communist Party

The 6521 Project, sometimes called the "6521 Group," was the moniker given to a nationwide operation initiated by the Chinese Communist Party (CCP) in 2009 to ensure "social stability" by cracking down on potential dissidents during anniversaries of political significance. The digits in the campaign’s name are a reference to the 60th anniversary of the founding of the People’s Republic of China, the 50th anniversary of the 1959 Tibetan uprising, the 20th anniversary of the 1989 Tiananmen Square protests and massacre, and the 10th anniversary of the persecution of Falun Gong.

The 6521 Project was initiated as a top-level committee by the CCP, and was reportedly headed by Xi Jinping, current CCP general secretary.

Under the campaign, all provinces and municipalities were required to establish temporary 6521 taskforces under the local Communist Party and Public Security leadership. Authorities at the township and county levels were also required to implement the 6521 project, reporting on their progress to municipal or provincial taskforces above them.

In parallel to the 6521 Project, a top-level coordinating body was created under the direction of Zhou Yongkang, called the "Central Committee for Comprehensive Management of Social Order." The committee identified a series of potential threats to social order, and prescribed measures to suppress them. The threats named included ethnic separatism in Tibet, Falun Gong, protests triggered by unemployment, land grabs, tainted products and labor disputes, crime, and the illicit installation of satellite receivers and illegal publishing. The Committee set out 33 measures to ensure social stability. It also revived a network of volunteer informants in schools and neighborhoods, and established a joint responsibility system that holds heads of households, work units, and local governments accountable in the event of protests or other destabilizing events.

== See also ==
- Human rights in the People's Republic of China
- List of campaigns of the Chinese Communist Party
- Ministry of State Security of the People's Republic of China
