= Liberty Sculpture Park =

American outdoor art installations

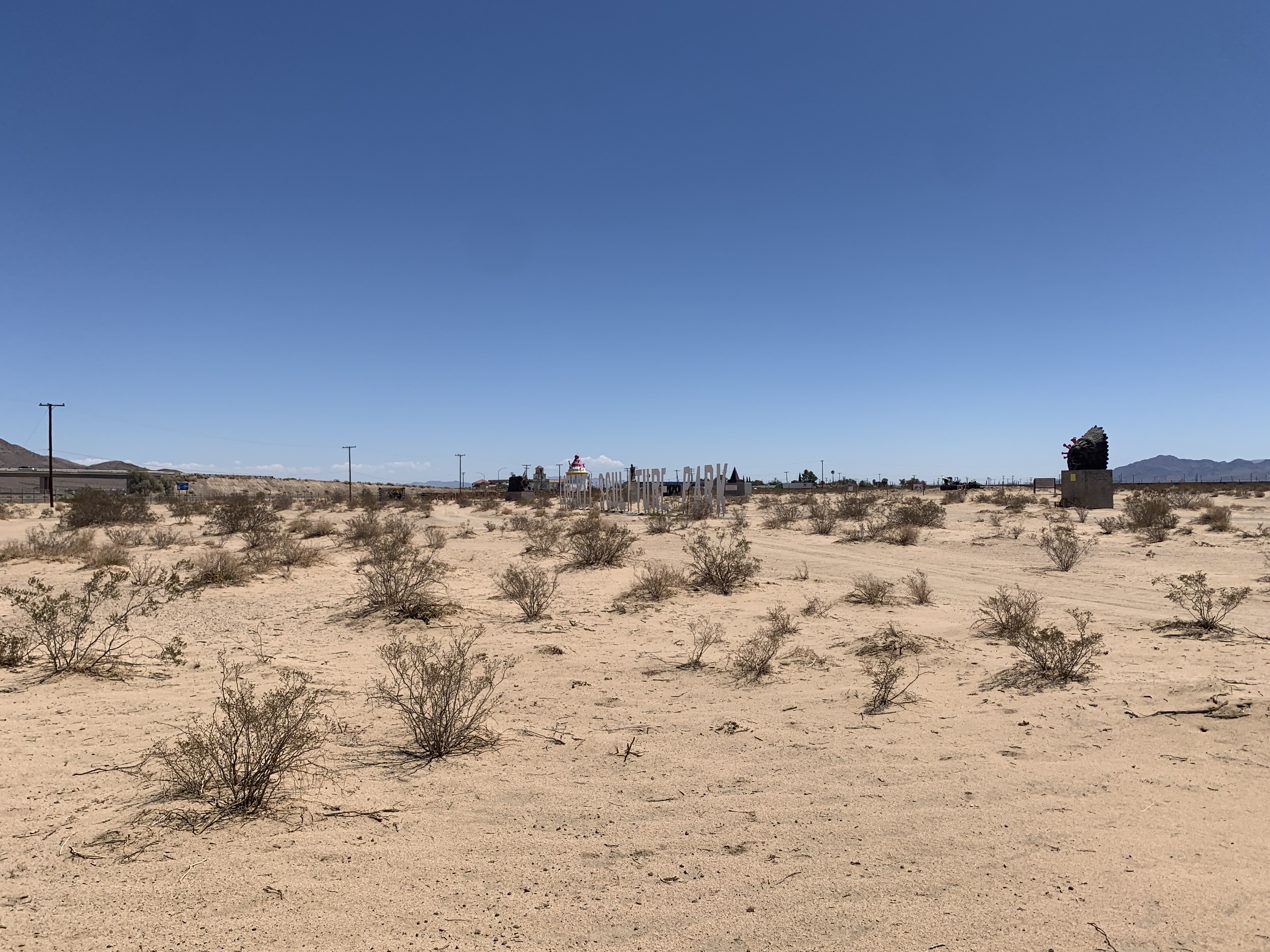
- Artist: Chen Weiming
- Year: 2017
- Location: Yermo, California, U.S.
- 34.908°N 116.842°W

Liberty Sculpture Park is an American non-governmental nonprofit sculpture park, located next to Interstate 15 in Yermo, California. Primarily a memorial to casualties of communist regimes, its artistic focus is largely on China, with Hong Kong and other attempts at representative democracy receiving attention as well.

Most of the sculptures focus on Chinese dissidents and their supporters. One such sculpture depicts Nancy Pelosi's visit with two other members of the United States Congress to China to honor the deceased 1989 Tiananmen Square demonstrators. Another statue, critical of CCP General Secretary Xi Jinping and his government's response to COVID-19, was destroyed by Chinese Communist Party (CCP) arsonists. The statue was rebuilt as CCP Virus II in the span of less than a year and reopened on June 6, 2022, two days after the 33rd anniversary of the Tiananmen Square massacre.

== Sculptures ==
- 64 Massacre Monument
- Goddess of Democracy (copy)
- Tank Man
- Crazy Horse
- The House Speaker Speaks Out
- Li Wangyang
- Liu Xiaobo in the cage
- CCP Virus II
- Liberate Hong Kong, Revolution of Our Times
