= Captive Nations Week =

Annual official observance in the United States

Public Law 86-90 which establishes Captive Nations Week

Captive Nations Week is an annual official observance in the United States aimed at demonstrating solidarity with "captive nations" under the control of governments the United States deems 'authoritarian'.

== Background ==
Initially, the week was aimed at raising public awareness of the Soviet occupation of Eastern European countries and of Soviet support for Communist governments in other regions of the world.

The week was first declared by a Congressional resolution in 1953 and signed into law (Public Law 86-90) by President Dwight D. Eisenhower in 1959. Every successive U.S. President, including President Barack Obama, President Donald Trump and President Joe Biden, has declared the third week of July to be Captive Nations Week. During the Cold War, events of Captive Nations Week were sometimes attended by US Presidents, mayors and governors.

== Present day ==
After the collapse of Communist governments in Eastern Europe, the week is also dedicated to supporting the newly liberal democratic governments of these countries.

Some diaspora groups from those countries deemed 'undemocratic' participate in events of the Captive Nations Week to draw public attention to problems with democracy and human rights in their respective home countries. Members of the Belarusian American community have been constituting a major part of the participants of Captive Nations Week marches in recent years. In 2019, among the topics of the Captive Nations March has been solidarity with Oleg Sentsov and other Ukrainians held captive by Russia at that time.

In 2019 Marion Smith, Executive Director of the Victims of Communism Memorial Foundation, has called for a resurrection of the Captive Nations Week because of a number of countries like China, Vietnam, North Korea or Laos still living under what the group deems 'authoritarian and totalitarian' Communist regimes along with Ukraine being the target of Russian military aggression.

In his 2022 proclamation, President Biden named several officially communist countries (Cuba, North Korea and China) and a number of non-communist countries (Russia, Iran, Belarus, Syria, Venezuela and Nicaragua) as captive nations but did not mention two officially communist countries, Laos and Vietnam, Vietnam notably having trade ties and strategic partnerships with the US.

== Criticism ==
The American foreign policy expert George Kennan, serving at the time as ambassador to Yugoslavia, sought unsuccessfully to dissuade President John F. Kennedy from proclaiming the week on the grounds that the United States had no reason to make the resolution, which in effect called for the overthrow of all Communist governments in Eastern Europe, whether it was the will of the people or not, a part of public policy.

Russian emigres to the United States (specifically representatives of the Congress of Russian Americans) argued that the Captive Nations Week was anti-Russian rather than anti-Communist since the list of "captive nations" did not include Russians, thus implying that the blame for the oppression of nations lies on the Russian nation rather than on the Soviet government (Dobriansky's allegedly Ukrainian nationalist views were named as the reason for this). Members of the Congress have campaigned for nullification of the Captive Nations law.

The Soviet government reacted harshly to the establishment of Captive Nations Week with Nikita Khrushchev referring to it as a "direct interference in the Soviet Union's internal affairs" and "the most unceremonious treatment of sovereign and independent countries which are members of the United Nations just as the United States".

Nevertheless, in his official address on the Captive Nations Week in 1983, President Ronald Reagan quoted Russian dissident writers Alexander Solzhenitsyn and Alexander Herzen.

A group of prominent American historians issued a statement claiming that PL 86-90 and the Captive Nations Week was largely based on misinformation and committed the United States to aiding ephemeral "nations" such as Cossackia and Idel-Ural.

== See also ==
- Soviet Empire
- National Captive Nations Committee
- Congress of the Enslaved Peoples of Russia
- Anti-Bolshevik Bloc of Nations
- Europe Day

== Bibliography ==
- Address of the Russian intellectuals to the Congress of the United States of America - Social Design Corporation. July 14, 2008.
- Fighting the 'Captive Nations Week Resolution' (Archived) - Congress of Russian Americans, Inc. 1999.
- Captive Nations Week, 2008 White House. 2008.
- Tim Weiner and Barbara Crossette. "George F. Kennan Dies at 101; Leading Strategist of Cold War". The New York Times. March 18, 2005.
- George F. Kennan: Cold War Iconoclast. Walter Hixson, 1988. ISBN 978-0-231-06894-9.
