= Captive Nations =

Cold War term used in United States Public Law 86–90

"Captive Nations" is a term that arose in the United States to describe non-democratically governed nations. During the Cold War, when the phrase appeared, it referred to nations under communist dictatorship, primarily Soviet influence.

As a part of the United States' Cold War strategy, an anti-Communist advocacy group, the National Captive Nations Committee, was established in 1959 according to an act of Congress (Pub. L. 86–90) by President Dwight D. Eisenhower. The American economist and diplomat of Ukrainian heritage Lev Dobriansky played a key role in it. The US branch of the Anti-Bolshevik Bloc of Nations also lobbied in favor of the bill.

The law also established Captive Nations Week, traditionally proclaimed for the third week in July since then. The move aimed at raising public awareness of the problems in nations under the control of Communist and certain anti-American non-democratic governments.

The original Public Law 86-90 specifically referred to the following as Captive Nations:

Public Law 86-90 which establishes Captive Nations Week

- Poland
- Hungary
- Lithuania
- Ukraine
- Czechoslovakia
- Latvia
- Estonia
- White Ruthenia (Belarus)
- Romania
- East Germany (now part of Germany)
- Bulgaria
- Mainland China
- Armenia
- Azerbaijan
- Georgia
- North Korea
- Albania
- Idel-Ural (composing Bashkortostan, Chuvashia, Mari El, Mordovia, Tatarstan, and Udmurtia)
- Tibet
- Cossackia
- Turkestan (composing Kazakhstan, Kyrgyzstan, Tajikistan, Turkmenistan, Uzbekistan and the Chinese autonomous region of Xinjiang)
- North Vietnam (now part of Vietnam)

== Criticism ==
Russian émigrés living in US, criticized P.L. 86-90 because in speaking of "Russian communism" and the "imperialistic policies of Communist Russia" the law by implication equated the terms "Russian", "Communist", and "Imperialist". Specifically, the Congress of Russian Americans argued that P.L. 86-90 was anti-Russian rather than anti-Communist since the list of "captive nations" did not include Russians, thus implying that the blame for the Communist crimes lies on the Russians as a nation, rather than on the Soviet system. According to the Russian writer Andrei Tsygankov, the suggested reason for this is that the law was designed by Lev Dobriansky, viewed by many Russian Americans as a Ukrainian nationalist. Members of Congress have campaigned for nullification of the Captive Nations law.

A group of American historians issued a statement stating that PL 86-90 was largely based on misinformation and committed the United States to aiding ephemeral "nations" such as Cossackia (Note: Cossackia may have referred to the lands of not just the Don and Kuban Cossacks, but that of the Northern Caucasus as well.) and Idel-Ural.

Gregory P. Tschebotarioff, Stephen Timoshenko, Nicholas V. Riasanovsky, Gleb Struve, and Nicholas Timasheff were among vocal opponents of PL 86-90.

In a 1959 news conference, President Eisenhower stated "Well, of course they don't admit there are any captive nations. They have their own propaganda. They present a picture to their own peoples, including the world, so far as they can, that we know is distorted and is untrue."

== Current vision ==
American leaders continue the tradition of celebrating Captive Nations Week and each year issue a new version of the Proclamation. Contemporary Proclamations do not refer to particular nations or states. The latest US president to specify a list of countries with "oppressive regimes" was George W. Bush, whose last Proclamation, given in 2008, mentioned Belarus, (Note: In 1959 Belarus was denoted as White Ruthenia.) Burma, Cuba, Iran, North Korea, Sudan, Syria, and Zimbabwe. Bush characterized these countries' leaders as "despots".

When declaring the July 2010 Captive Nations Week, President Barack Obama stated that while the Cold War was over, concerns raised by President Eisenhower remained valid.

In his 2022 proclamation, President Joe Biden named several officially communist countries (Cuba, North Korea, and China) and several non-communist countries (Russia, Iran, Belarus, Syria, Venezuela and Nicaragua) among captive nations with "repressive regimes" but did not mention two officially communist countries, Laos and Vietnam, the latter notably having better relations with the US.

== See also ==
- Brezhnev Doctrine
- Eastern Bloc
- Military occupations by the Soviet Union
- Overrun Countries series
- Prison of peoples
- Russian-occupied territories
- Soviet empire
- Western betrayal
- United Nations list of non-self-governing territories

== Sources ==
- Edmund Charaszkiewicz, Zbiór dokumentów ppłk. Edmunda Charaszkiewicza, opracowanie, wstęp i przypisy (A Collection of Documents by Lt. Col. Edmund Charaszkiewicz, edited, with introduction and notes by) Andrzej Grzywacz, Marcin Kwiecień, Grzegorz Mazur (Biblioteka Centrum Dokumentacji Czynu Niepodległościowego, tom [vol.] 9), Kraków, Księgarnia Akademicka, 2000, ISBN 978-83-7188-449-8.
