= Museum of Communism =

Museum of Communism may refer to:

- Museum of Communism, Prague
- Museum of Communism, Warsaw
