= NCNC =

NCNC may refer to:

- National Captive Nations Committee
- National Council of Nigeria and the Cameroons
