= Taras Shevchenko Memorial =

Memorial in Washington, D.C., U.S.

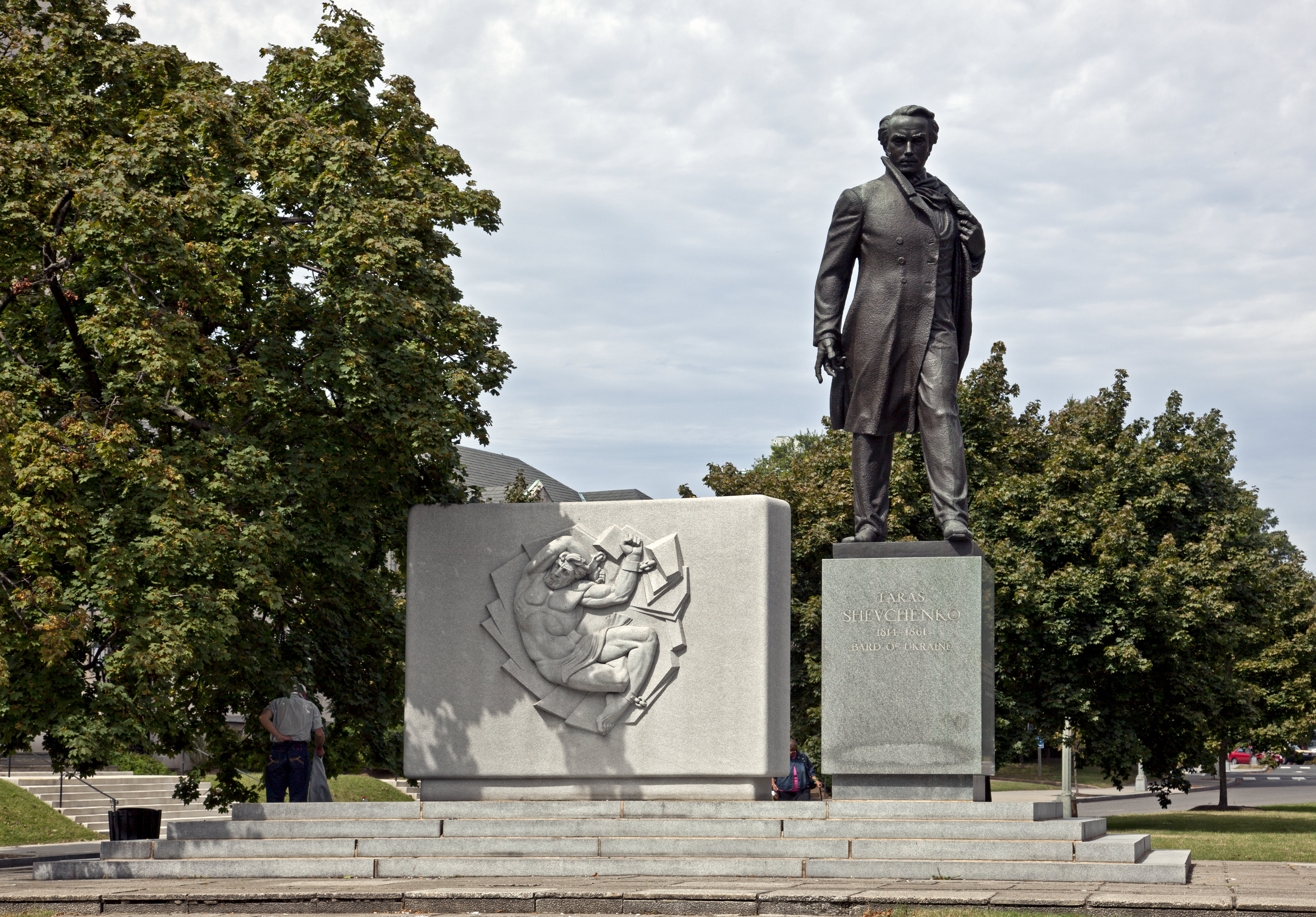
- Interactive map of Taras Shevchenko Memorial
- Location: 2200 block of P Street NW; Washington, D.C., U.S.
- Coordinates: 38°54′36.06″N 77°2′56.25″W
- Designer: Leo Mol (sculptor); Radoslav Zuk (architect); Jones Brothers Company (stonework)
- Material: Bronze (statue); Granite (base, wall)
- Length: 4.7 feet (1.4 m)
- Width: 4.6 feet (1.4 m)
- Height: 21 feet (6.4 m)
- Beginning date: July 14, 1962
- Opening date: June 27, 1964
- Dedicated to: Taras Shevchenko

The Taras Shevchenko Memorial is a bronze statue and stone relief-adorned wall located on the 2200 block of P Street NW in the Dupont Circle neighborhood of Washington, D.C., United States. It is one of many monuments in Washington, D.C. that honor foreign heroes who symbolize freedom in their native countries. Sculpted by Leo Mol, the memorial honors Taras Shevchenko (1814–1861), a Ukrainian poet and artist who influenced the development of modern Ukrainian literature.

The committee to build the memorial included former U.S. President Harry S. Truman as the honorary head. Opposition to the memorial's installation was led by The Washington Post. It was dedicated in 1964, the 150th anniversary of Shevchenko's birth. Dignitaries at the dedication ceremony included prominent Ukrainian Americans, former U.S. President Dwight D. Eisenhower, members of the U.S. Congress, and Hollywood actors.

The Taras Shevchenko Memorial and surrounding park are maintained by the National Park Service. The Consolidated Appropriations Act, 2023, renamed the surrounding park as Ukrainian Independence Park. The statue is one of two Ukrainian monuments in the nation's capital. The second, a memorial to the Ukrainian victims of the 1932–1933 famine, was completed in 2015.

== History ==
=== Background ===
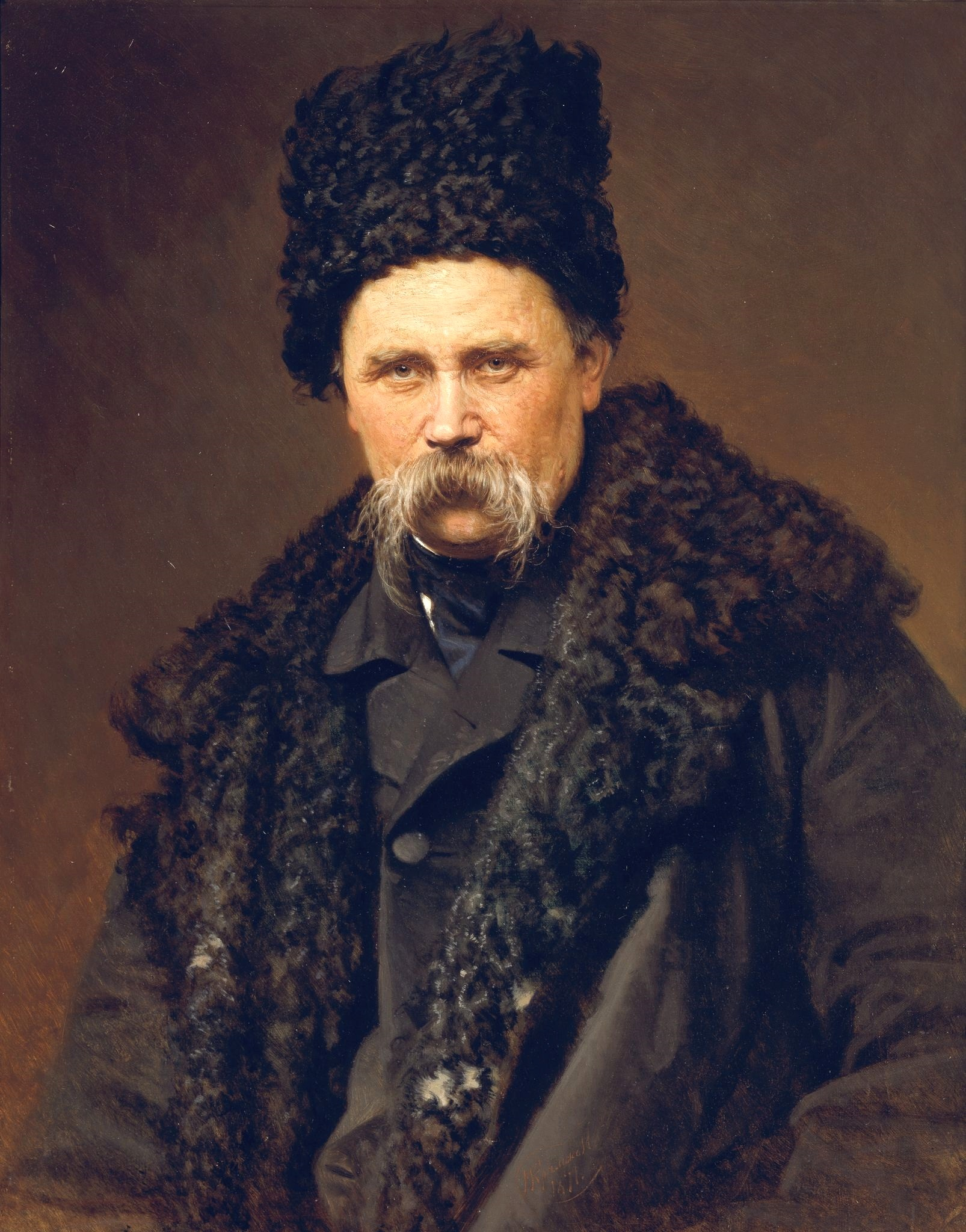
Portrait of Taras Shevchenko by Ivan Kramskoi

In addition to its numerous memorials and monuments which pay homage to famous Americans, Washington, D.C. is home to many artworks honoring foreign heroes. Examples in Dupont Circle include memorials honoring Mohandas Karamchand Gandhi of India, Tomáš Garrigue Masaryk of Czechoslovakia, and Lajos Kossuth of Hungary. The idea of a U.S. monument honoring Shevchenko began with the American Shevchenko Society, founded in 1898. Although the group's efforts never came to fruition, Ukrainian Americans continued to pursue the goal. A turning point was when Professor Ivan Dubrovsky wrote an article in Svoboda titled "In Favor of a Shevchenko Monument in Washington, D.C.", asking for support from the Shevchenko Scientific Society and Ukrainian Congress Committee of America (UCCA). Thousands of Ukrainian Americans sent letters to members of Congress while Lev Dobriansky, a Ukrainian American economist and anti-communism activist, became a prominent advocate and lobbyist for erecting a monument honoring Shevchenko. The activists eventually gained the support of Senator Jacob K. Javits of New York and Representative Alvin Morell Bentley of Michigan. Javits said "Taras Shevchenko was a bard of freedom...It is fitting that the statue of such a national hero, who taught the American ideals of patriotism and service to man, should stand in the capital of the U.S." and Bentley stated, "In erecting a statue of Taras Shevchenko in Washington the United States will give full expression to its understanding and appreciation of Taras Shevchenko and all that he means to the brave and noble Ukrainian people."

In April 1960, while a bill authorizing the erection of the statue was circulating through the House of Representatives, officials from the National Park Service and Interior Department lodged a complaint to the House Administration committee about the number of monuments being built in Washington, D.C. The bill was subsequently postponed. The resolution was later unanimously approved by the House of Representatives in June followed by the Senate in August. On September 13, 1960, U.S. President Dwight D. Eisenhower signed Public Law 86-749, authorizing the erection of the Shevchenko monument. The resolution stated in part:

Whereas throughout Eastern Europe, in the last century and this, the name and works of Taras Shevchenko brilliantly reflected the aspirations of man for personal liberty and national independence; and
Whereas Shevchenko, the poet laureate of Ukraine, was greatly inspired by our great American tradition to fight against the imperialist and colonial occupation of his native land; and
Whereas in many parts of the free world observances of the Shevchenko centennial will be held during 1961 in honor of this immortal champion of liberty; and
Whereas in our moral capacity as free men in an independent Nation it behooves us to symbolize tangibly the inseparable spiritual ties bound in the writings of Shevchenko between our country and the forty million Ukraine nation:...

In September 1960, UCCA president Dobriansky assisted with establishing the Taras Shevchenko Memorial Committee of America, Inc. It was headed by Dobriansky, president of the General Council of Shevchenko societies Roman Smal-Stocky, and Ukrainian Free Academy of Sciences in the U.S.A. president George Shevelov, with former U.S. President Harry S. Truman serving as an honorary head. Later that year a design competition was announced with one of the requirements being "the public at large to see the poet depicted in his youth." Seventeen sculpture designs were submitted and on July 14, 1962, the committee unanimously chose the one by Leonid Molozhanyn (Leo Mol), a Ukrainian Canadian who would go on to sculpt works in several countries depicting Shevchenko. Mol was paid $1,500 for winning the competition while two second place artists were each paid $1,000, and two third place artists paid $750 each. The total cost of the memorial was around $250,000, which was paid for by the UCCA and donations made by over 50,000 people, mostly Ukrainian-Americans. The design and layout of the memorial site was approved by the U.S. Commission of Fine Arts in April 1963. The site was designed by architect Radoslav Zuk and the contractor was the M. Cain Company. The stonework was provided by the Jones Brother Company while the carving was completed by Vincent Illuzzi, Sr.

==== Opposition ====
The choice of Shevchenko as the subject for a statue was not without controversy. Opponents, such as The Washington Post editorial board, argued "the Ukrainian poet is known to only a few Americans, he is the idol of the Soviet Communist Party, he is anti-Semitic and anti-Polish." Following the strongly worded editorial's publication, there was a deluge of angry responses, including from members of Congress like Representatives Thaddeus J. Dulski of New York and Ed Derwinski of Illinois. Derwinski said erecting a memorial to Shevchenko seemed appropriate when compared with some of the other statues in the city, such as those honoring Dante, Edmund Burke, and Jose de San Martin.

After more than 2,000 people gathered at the memorial site for the groundbreaking ceremony on September 21, 1963, there were repeated calls during the next several months for the memorial plans to be scrapped. In November, a member of the National Capital Planning Commission, which was required to approve the statue according to the congressional resolution, called for the cancellation of the memorial. The next month Secretary of the Interior Stewart Udall said he wanted to review plans to construct the memorial. Attempts to derail the project ultimately failed when capital planners said they lacked the authority to stop the erection of the statue.

Initially Soviet Union officials, including the Soviet embassy and Ukrainian SSR representatives at the United Nations, were opposed to the memorial and demanded the U.S. State Department cancel the plans. They eventually accepted the idea and the Soviet embassy requested to be involved with the memorial's dedication. This did not occur though because the memorial's inscription was "carefully worded by the statue's sponsors to embarrass the Soviet Union and to discourage Soviet delegations from laying wreaths at the memorial."

=== Dedication ===
Former U.S. President Dwight D. Eisenhower unveiling the statue.

The statue, founded by the Bedi-Rassy Art Foundry, was placed on its pedestal on June 3, 1964. The memorial dedication ceremony took place a few weeks later on June 27. The day-long festivities included concerts at DAR Constitution Hall and a procession of around 35,000 people of Ukrainian descent, many wearing native clothing, marching from the Ellipse to the memorial site. The parade marchers, arriving by buses and cars decorated with stickers, flags, and blue and yellow signs, had been gathering since early in the morning. Led by Colonel William Rybak, it took four hours for all the participants to march past the White House, west on Pennsylvania Avenue, and north on 23rd Street to the memorial site.

There were approximately 100,000 people in attendance at the ceremony, including delegations from Argentina, Australia, Belgium, Canada, France, Germany, and the United Kingdom, as well as U.S. government representatives and foreign ambassadors. In addition to Leo Mol, dignitaries in attendance included the following: Stepan Vytvytskyi, president of the Ukrainian People's Republic in exile; UCCA president Dobriansky and other leaders of Ukrainian American organizations like Ukrainian National Association president Joseph Sawyer, Archbishops Ambrose Senyshyn and Mstyslav Skrypnyk; U.S. Representatives Derwinski, Dulski, Michael A. Feighan of Ohio, and Daniel J. Flood of Pennsylvania; actors Jack Palance and Mike Mazurki; and Miss World United States Michele Metrinko.

The ceremony was opened by Dobriansky followed by a rendition of the U.S. national anthem, "The Star-Spangled Banner". Senyshyn then read the invocation in English and Ukrainian and Roman Smal-Stocki, president of the memorial committee, spoke about the significance of the monument. Perhaps the most prominent attendee was former U.S. President Eisenhower, who was chosen to unveil the statue. Before he did so, Eisenhower was cheered for several minutes as the crowd chanted "We Like Ike!" Following a 12-minute speech, Eisenhower unveiled the statue, calling Shevchenko a Ukrainian hero and stated: "For my hope is that your magnificent march from the shadow of the Washington Monument to the foot of the statue of Shevchenko will here kindle a new world movement in the hearts, minds, words and actions of men; a never-ending movement dedicated to the independence and freedom of peoples of all captive nations of the entire world." He also said the statue represented "millions of oppressed" in Eastern Europe and "gives them constant encouragement to struggle forever against Communist tyranny, until, one day final victory is achieved, as it most surely will be." Following the unveiling, the Ukrainian Choral Societies of America led the crowd in a musical rendition of Shevchenko's poem Testament. Additional speeches were then made by several U.S. Representatives and Archbishop Ioan Theodorovych of the Ukrainian Orthodox Church gave the benediction. The ceremony concluded with the crowd singing Ukraine's national anthem, Shche ne vmerla Ukraina (English: Ukraine Has Not Yet Died).

=== Later history ===
A stainless steel urn containing soil from Shevchenko's grave was installed at the base of the memorial in May 1965. A commemorative book which includes a brief history of the monument, a list of the memorial fund donors, and other documents related to the site were also installed in the base. The memorial was the site of protest rallies held by Ukrainian Americans who objected to the Soviet Union's policies. It has been described as "a symbol of Ukrainian independence and a rallying point of the Ukrainian-American community." Ukrainian dignitaries still visit the memorial, such as President Viktor Yushchenko, who laid a wreath at the statue in April 2005. Sviatoslav Shevchuk, head of the Ukrainian Greek Catholic Church, and Olexander Motsyk, Ukrainian ambassador to the United States, each visited the site in 2014.

The memorial site is administered by the National Park Service, a federal agency of the Interior Department. It falls within the park service's administrative unit known as the National Mall and Memorial Parks. In response to Russia’s 2022 invasion of Ukraine, the park in which the statue stands was designated Ukraine Independence Park by the U.S. Congress in December 2022.

=== Second Ukrainian monument ===
In 2006, the U.S. Congress approved a monument to honor the millions of Ukrainians who died as a result of the 1932–1933 Holodomor, a famine-genocide caused by the Soviet Union. The memorial site is located on a triangular lot on Massachusetts Avenue NW near Union Station. On December 2, 2008, a dedication ceremony was held at the future site for the Holodomor Memorial, with Ukraine's then-First Lady Kateryna Yushchenko among the speakers. Formally dedicated on November 7, 2015, it is the second memorial in Washington, D.C. to honor victims of Communism, the other being the Victims of Communism Memorial, also located near Union Station.

== Design and location ==
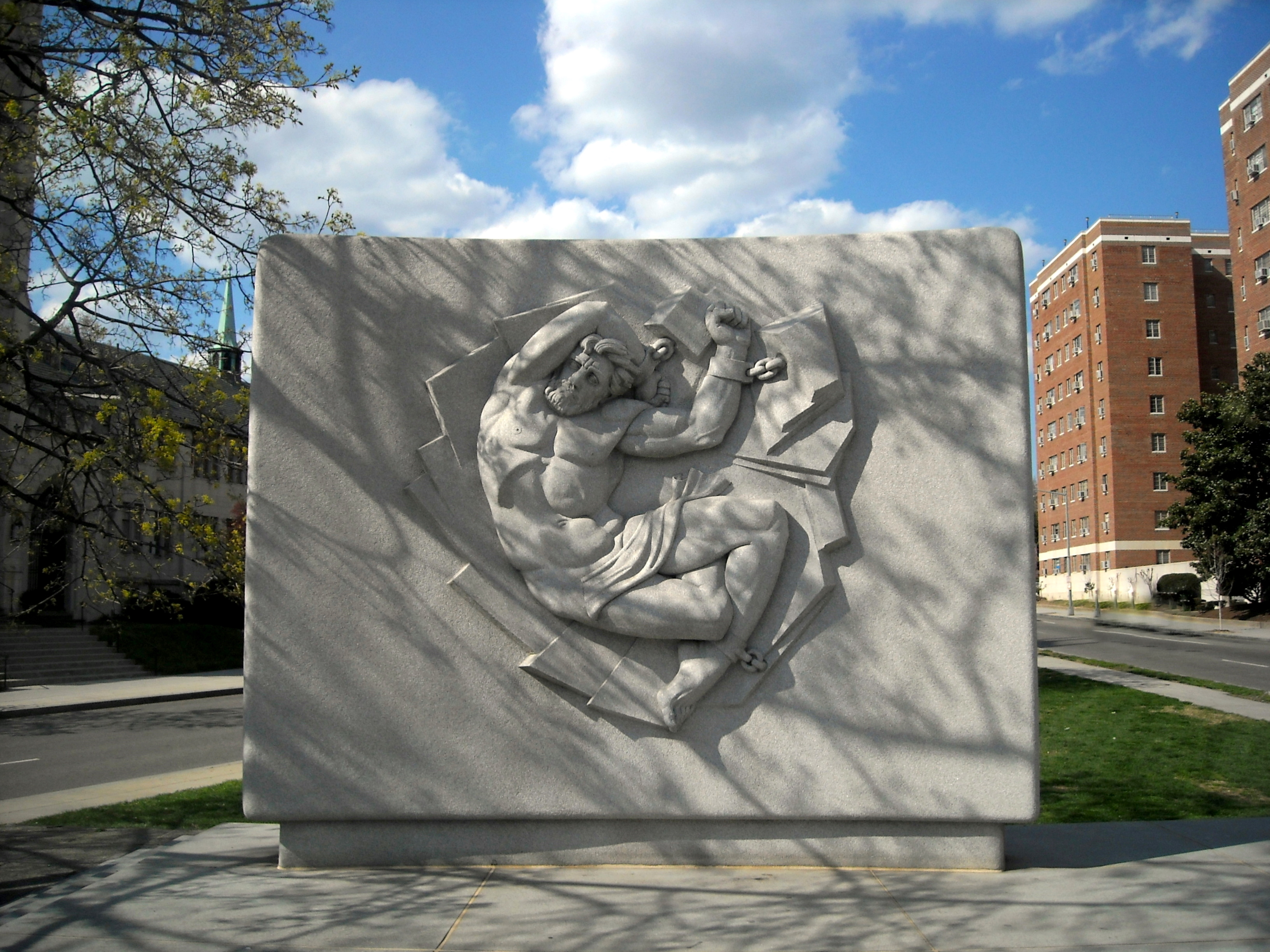
The granite wall and relief of Prometheus.

The memorial is located in the middle of a triangular park, bounded by P Street (south) and 22nd Street (east and west) NW, across the street from the Church of the Pilgrims and one block from Rock Creek Park. It consists of a bronze statue on a Vermont granite base next to a Vermont granite wall with relief. The statue is approximately 14 feet (4.3 m) tall, 4.7 feet (1.4 m) wide, and 4.6 feet (1.4 m) long while the base is approximately 7 feet (2.1 m) tall. The statue, which faces south, depicts Shevchenko wearing a long suit coat and stepping forward as his left hand holds his jacket lapel. His slightly opened right hand is pointed downwards and hangs by his side. Shevchenko is also depicted as a young-to-middle age adult with short wavy hair and a moustache. The relief depicts the martyred Greek god Prometheus. The statue and wall are on a four-stepped platform surrounded by a stone plaza.

Inscriptions on the memorial include the following:

- BEDI-RASSY ART FDRY. N.Y. (statue, lower north side)
- TARAS / SHEVCHENKO / 1814–1861 / BARD OF UKRAINE (base, south side)
- DEDICATED TO / THE LIBERATION, FREEDOM AND / INDEPENDENCE OF ALL CAPTIVE NATIONS / THIS MONUMENT OF TARAS SHEVCHENKO, 19TH / CENTURY UKRAINIAN POET AND FIGHTER FOR / INDEPENDENCE OF UKRAINE AND THE FREEDOM / OF ALL MANKIND, WHO UNDER FOREIGN RUSSIAN / IMPERIALIST TYRANNY AND COLONIAL RULE / APPEALED FOR "THE NEW AND RIGHTEOUS LAW OF / WASHINGTON," WAS UNVEILED ON JUNE 27, 1964. / THIS HISTORIC EVENT COMMEMORATED THE / 150TH ANNIVERSARY OF SHEVCHENKO'S BIRTH. / THE MEMORIAL WAS AUTHORIZED BY THE 86TH / CONGRESS OF THE UNITED STATES OF AMERICA / ON AUGUST 31, 1960, AND SIGNED INTO PUBLIC / LAW 86-749 BY DWIGHT D. EISENHOWER, THE 34TH / PRESIDENT OF THE UNITED STATES OF AMERICA, / ON SEPTEMBER 13, 1960. THE STATUE WAS ERECTED / BY AMERICANS OF UKRAINIAN ANCESTRY AND FRIENDS. (base, north side)
- LEO MOL – SCULPTOR / RADOSLAV ZUK – ARCHITECT (base, lower north side)
- WHEN WILL UKRAINE / HAVE ITS WASHINGTON / WITH FAIR AND JUST LAWS? / SOMEDAY WE WILL! (base, west side)
- ...OUR SOUL SHALL NEVER PERISH, / FREEDOM KNOWS NO DYING, / AND THE GREEDY CANNOT HARVEST / FIELDS WHERE SEAS ARE LYING. // CANNOT BIND THE LIVING SPIRIT / NOR THE LIVING WORD / CANNOT SMIRCH THE SACRED GLORY / OF TH'ALMIGHTY LORD. // TARAS SHEVCHENKO 'THE CAUCASUS.' 1845. (wall, north side)

== Notes ==
1. The northbound lanes of 22nd Street NW are on the east side of the park while the southbound lanes are on the west side.
2. This is a translation of the inscription. It is a quote from Shevchenko's 1857 poem, The Holy Fool, that is written in Ukrainian.

== See also ==
- List of public art in Washington, D.C., Ward 2
- Outdoor sculpture in Washington, D.C.
- Ukraine–United States relations
