= Medal of Freedom (disambiguation) =

Medal of Freedom may refer to:

- Presidential Medal of Freedom
- Medal of Freedom (1945), replaced in 1963 by the Presidential Medal of Freedom
- Truman–Reagan Medal of Freedom, presented by the Victims of Communism Memorial Foundation
