= Victims of Communism Memorial Foundation =

American non-profit organization founded in 1994

- Abbreviation: VOC
- Founded: 1994; 32 years ago
- Founders: Lee Edwards; Lev Dobriansky; Zbigniew Brzezinski
- Type: Non-profit
- Tax ID no.: 52-1920858
- Purpose: Commemoration of communist crimes
- Headquarters: 900 15th Street NW, Washington, D.C. 20005
- Key people: Elizabeth Spalding, Chairman
- Website: victimsofcommunism.org

The Victims of Communism Memorial Foundation (VOC) is a non-profit organization dedicated to research, education, and commemoration of communist crimes. Based in Washington, D.C., the VOC was set up by an Act of Congress in 1993 to create "a national memorial to honor the victims of communism".

The organization was responsible for building the Victims of Communism Memorial in Washington, D.C., and it is a member of the European Union's Platform of European Memory and Conscience.

== History ==
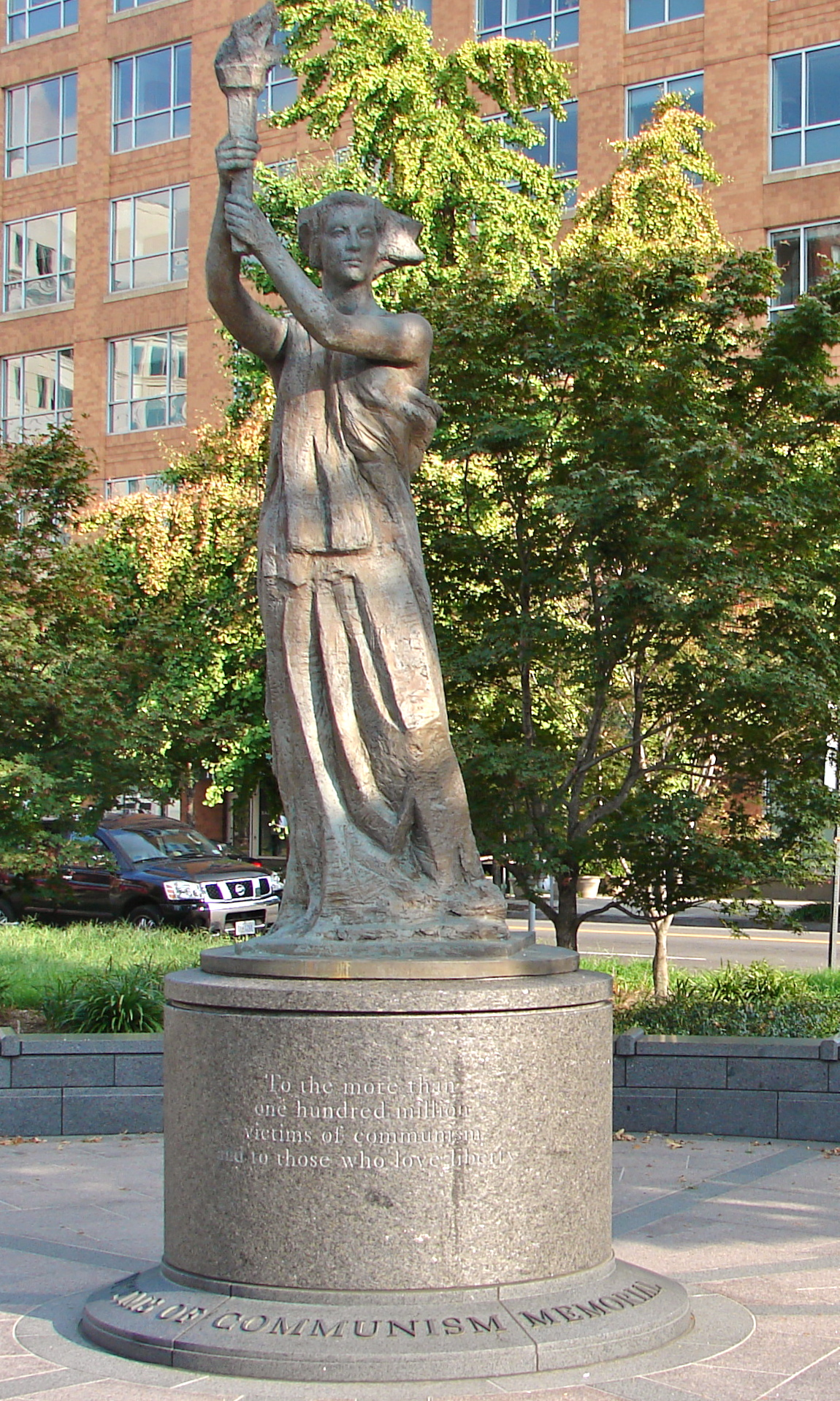
The Victims of Communism Memorial is a recreation of the Goddess of Democracy, which was destroyed by the government of China in the 1989 Tiananmen Square protests and massacre.

In 1991, Senator Steve Symms and Representative Dana Rohrabacher introduced concurrent resolutions in the United States Congress urging the construction of "an International Memorial to the Victims of Communism at an appropriate location within the boundaries of the District of Columbia and for the appointment of a commission to oversee the design, construction and all other pertinent details of the memorial."

In 1993, Rohrabacher and fellow Senator Jesse Helms sponsored amendments to the FRIENDSHIP Act of 1993 which authorized such construction. The act was signed into law by President Bill Clinton on December 17, 1993. It cited "the deaths of over 100,000,000 victims in an unprecedented imperial holocaust" and resolved that "the sacrifices of these victims should be permanently memorialized so that never again will nations and peoples allow so evil a tyranny to terrorize the world."

According to Title IX, Section 905 of Public Law 103–199, an independent organization was to be established to construct, maintain, and operate the Victims of Communism Memorial in Washington, D.C., as well as to collect the contributions for the establishment of the memorial and to encourage the participation of all groups suffered under communist regimes. In 2007, the foundation completed the Victims of Communism Memorial, which was dedicated by President George W. Bush. In 2016, the foundation released a list of 51 prisoners of conscience in Cuba just before President Barack Obama's visit and meeting with Cuban leader Raúl Castro. In 2020, the organization released a report alleging organ harvesting from Falun Gong practitioners and Uyghurs in China.

In August 2026, the foundation was declared an undesirable organization in Russia.

== Programs ==
=== Victims of Communism Memorial ===
The memorial was dedicated on June 12, 2007, the 20th anniversary of President Ronald Reagan's "Tear down this wall!" speech in Berlin. The unveiling of the statue in Washington, D.C., earned international press attention.

The land was a gift of the National Park Service, and the remaining cost, over $1 million, was raised from private sources. Sculpted by Thomas Marsh, it is a 10-foot bronze replica of the Papier-mâché Goddess of Democracy statue made by student democracy protesters leading up to the Tiananmen Square massacre in 1989.

=== Museum ===
In June 2022, the foundation opened a museum at 900 15th St NW two blocks from the White House. It is across the street from McPherson Square Park and McPherson Metro Station. The grand opening featured three permanent galleries and a temporary gallery focused on the victims of communism. In the Washington Post, columnist George F. Will wrote that "Visitors to the museum will experience a wholesome immersion in the nation's anti-communist success. And they will be reminded that this work is unfinished".

=== Truman-Reagan Medal of Freedom ===
The foundation annually presents its Truman-Reagan Medal of Freedom at an event that honors opponents of communism and has been used to raise funds for the construction of the memorial. Past recipients include Myroslav Marynovych, Chen Guangcheng, Tom Lantos, Pope John Paul II, Václav Havel, Yang Jianli, Thadeus Nguyễn Văn Lý, Yelena Bonner, William F. Buckley Jr., Richard Pipes, Guillermo Fariñas, Lane Kirkland, Armando Valladares, János Horváth, Lech Wałęsa, Anna Walentynowicz, National Endowment for Democracy, and Henry M. Jackson.

=== Projects ===
In 2015, the foundation released a biopic video series called Witness Project, featuring interviews with witnesses of communism. In 2024 the United States House of Representatives passed the Crucial Communism Teaching Act, which directs the Victims of Communism Memorial Foundation to create an education program for high schools about the dangers of communism.

== Personnel ==
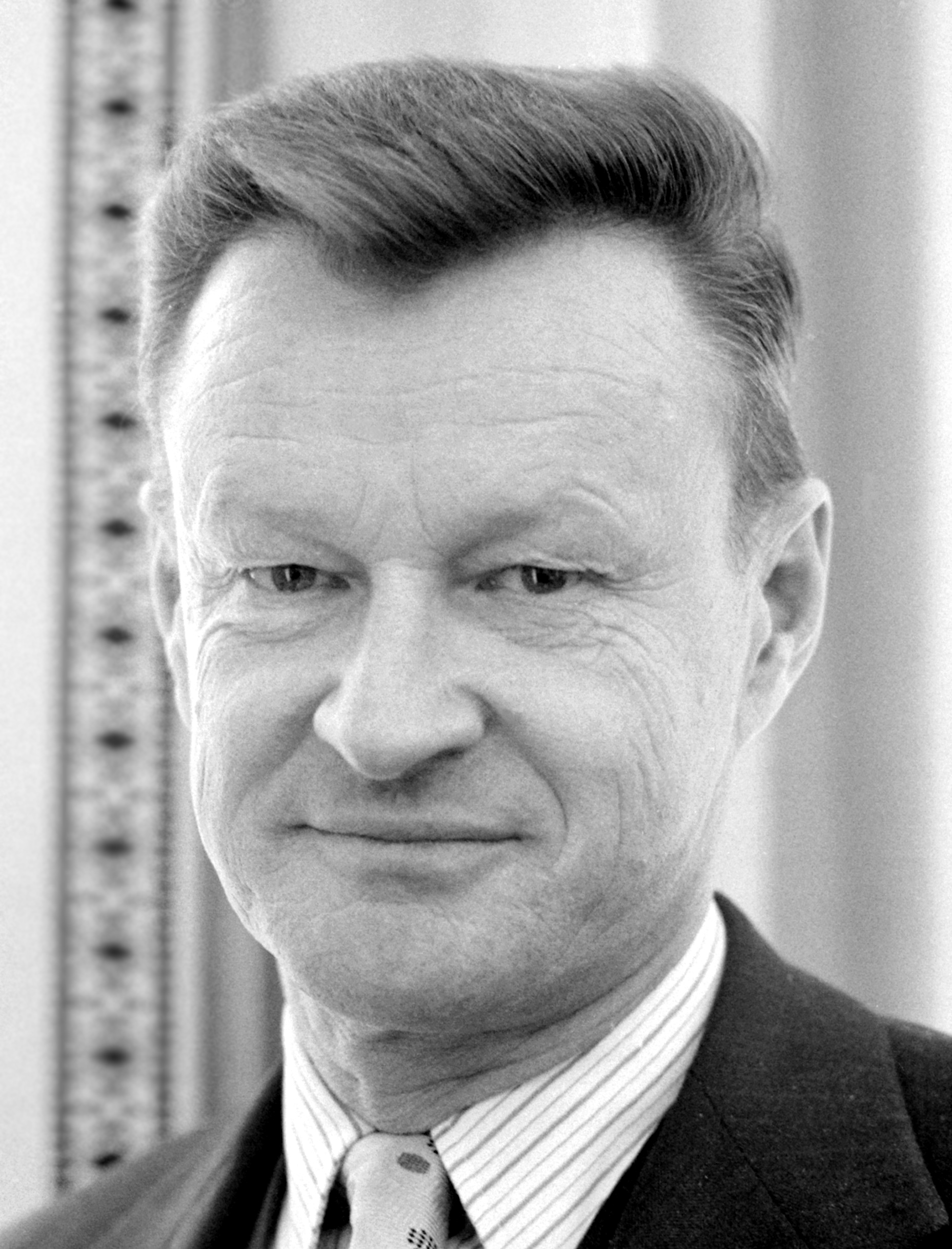
Zbigniew Brzezinski, one of the co-founders of the organization

The VOC's chairman is Elizabeth Edwards Spalding. Its chairman emeritus and co-founder is scholar Edwin Feulner. Its previous chairman emeritus was Lee Edwards, an academic and distinguished fellow at The Heritage Foundation. Lev Dobriansky, economics professor and chairman of the anti-communist National Captive Nations Committee, previously served as chairman emeritus. Its vice chairman is Randal Teague.

Andrew Bremberg, former department manager for federally funded not-for-profit defence research contractor MITRE and former director of the Domestic Policy Council for President Donald Trump, serves as president of VOC. Ken Pope is the current CEO.

The advisory council includes Sali Berisha, Dennis DeConcini, Carl Gershman, Mart Laar, Vytautas Landsbergis, Katrina Lantos Swett, Daniel Lipinski, Guntis Ulmanis, Armando Valladares, and others.

== Reception ==
According to specialists in Russian studies Kristen Ghodsee and Scott Sehon, the theory articulated by the foundation that 100 million people have been killed under communism is dubious, originating in a book, The Black Book of Communism by Stéphane Courtois, which attracted praise but also criticism from historians. Ghodsee and Sehon wrote that, while "quibbling about numbers is unseemly. What matters is that many, many people were killed by communist regimes."

Ghodsee says that the foundation, along with its counterpart organizations in Eastern Europe, seek to institutionalize the "Victims of Communism" narrative with the double genocide theory, or the alleged moral equivalence between the Nazi Holocaust and mass killings and crimes against humanity under communist regimes.

== See also ==
- Memorial (society) – liberal human rights anti-communist organization in Russia banned in 2022
- Soviet war crimes

=== Other notable memorials ===
- Memorial to the Victims of Communism in Prague, Czech Republic
- Memorial to the Victims of Communism – Canada, a Land of Refuge, in Ottawa, Canada. All names of the victims were removed from the memorial when it was discovered that most of the named were members of Waffen SS and other Nazi-linked organizations.
- Monument to the Victims of the Soviet Occupation in Moldova
- Memorial to Victims of Stalinist Repression in Moldova
- Museum of Communism, Czech Republic
- Museum of Communism, Warsaw
- Victims of Communism 1940–1991 Memorial in Tallinn, Estonia
- Virtual Museum of Soviet Repression in Belarus
