= Lev Dobriansky =

American diplomat (1918–2008)

Lev E. Dobriansky

5th United States Ambassador to the Bahamas
- In office October 25, 1982 – August 30, 1986
- President: Ronald Reagan
- Preceded by: William Bernstein Schwartz Jr.
- Succeeded by: Carol Boyd Hallett

Personal details
- Born: Leo Dobriansky; November 9, 1918 New York City, New York, U.S.
- Died: January 30, 2008 (aged 89)
- Party: Republican
- Children: Paula Dobriansky
- Education: New York University (BA, MA, PhD)
- Profession: Diplomat

Lev Eugene Dobriansky (November 9, 1918 – January 30, 2008) was an American diplomat and professor of economics at Georgetown University. He served as U.S. Ambassador to the Bahamas, and was also an anti-communist advocate. He is known for his work with the National Captive Nations Committee and the Victims of Communism Memorial Foundation, and formerly served as the chairman emeritus of the latter.

== Life and education ==
Dobriansky was born on November 9, 1918, in New York City, the son of Ruthenian emigrants from Western Ukraine (then Austria-Hungary). His father, Ivan (John), was born in Kalush and his mother, Eugenia (née Greszczuk), emigrated in 1910. He had a brother, Bohdan. He received an undergraduate degree in 1941 and a master's degree in 1943 from New York University, where he was an instructor of economics throughout the 1940s. He received his doctorate from NYU in 1951. His dissertation was a critique of the economist Thorstein Veblen.

Dobriansky taught economics at Georgetown University in Washington, D.C., from 1948 until his retirement in 1987. During his tenure there, he became a professor emeritus and taught such classes as "Soviet Economics." Among his students was Kateryna Yushchenko (née Chumachenko), the future First Lady of Ukraine. In 1970, he founded and directed the Institute on Comparative Political and Economic Systems at Georgetown.

In 1956 he was made Chairman of the "Ethnic/Nationalities/Heritage Groups Division" of the Republican National Committee. Dobriansky was also a faculty member at the National War College from 1957 to 1958, and served as a consultant for the United States Department of State, the International Communication Agency, and the United States House of Representatives.

== Diplomatic service ==
Dobriansky briefly worked in an official capacity in Chile (1975–1976).

On October 25, 1982, Dobriansky was nominated by President Ronald Reagan as Ambassador to the Bahamas, succeed the previous ambassador, William B. Schwartz. Dobriansky remained on this post until August 30, 1986.

== Anti-communist activism ==
Dobriansky was the chairman of National Captive Nations Committee (NCNC). of which the local committees were often allied with the Banderite wing of the Organization of Ukrainian Nationalists. Dobriansky wrote the Captive Nations Week Resolution, which was adopted by the United States Congress and signed into law by President Dwight D. Eisenhower in July 1959. As a result of his activism, this resolution has been proclaimed every year by each successive president. He also founded and chaired for many years the related National Captive Nations Committee, which advocated for the nations memorialized in the resolution.

In September, 1960, Dobriansky testified before the House Un-American Activities Committee on the role of Soviet premier Nikita Khrushchev in crimes against the Ukrainian people perpetrated by his predecessor, Joseph Stalin, such as the Holodomor. Dobriansky sat on the advisory board of the United States Council for World Freedom, the US branch of the World Anti-Communist League established in 1981.

In 1993, Congress authorized the NCNC to begin raising funds to build a Victims of Communism Memorial. To this end, Dobriansky helped create the Victims of Communism Memorial Foundation, along with such notables as Lee Edwards, Grover Norquist, and Zbigniew Brzezinski. He served as the foundation's first chairman. After many years of fundraising and advocacy, the Memorial was finally completed on June 12, 2007, less than a year before Dobriansky's death.

Dobriansky also played a role in the construction of another Washington, D.C., monument - a statue of Taras Shevchenko, the Ukrainian nationalist and artist.

Dobriansky was involved in the Ukrainian National Information Service, the American Council for World Freedom, the Ukrainian Congress Committee of America, and the United States Council for World freedom.

== Legacy ==
Paula Dobriansky

Notices after his death on January 30, 2008, include a press office release from the former president of Ukraine, Viktor Yushchenko.

The foreign policy expert and former diplomat Paula Dobriansky, his daughter, is a trustee of the foundation he helped establish, the Victims of Communism Memorial Foundation.

== Bibliography ==
Books

- Veblenism: A New Critique. Public Affairs Press, 1957. Introduction by James Burnham.
- The Vulnerable Russians. Pageant Press, 1967.
- U.S.A. and the Soviet Myth. Devin-Adair Company, 1971.

Published addresses

- The Non-Russian Nations in the U.S.S.R.: Focal Point in America's Policy of National Liberation.

"... a very able address ... at the conference on psychological strategy in the cold war, held in Washington on Friday, February 22, 1952."

Diplomatic posts
Preceded by William Bernstein Schwartz Jr.	United States Ambassador to Bahamas; 1982 – 1986	Succeeded by Carol Boyd Hallett
