= Brezhnev Doctrine =

Foreign policy justifying intervention in the Soviet Bloc

Eastern Bloc: the USSR and its satellite states

The Brezhnev Doctrine was a Soviet foreign policy that proclaimed that any threat to "socialist rule" in any state of the Soviet Bloc in Central and Eastern Europe was a threat to all of them, and therefore, it justified the intervention of fellow socialist states. It was proclaimed in order to justify the Soviet-led occupation of Czechoslovakia earlier in 1968, with the overthrow of the reformist government there. The references to "socialism" meant control by the communist parties which were loyal to the Kremlin. Soviet leader Mikhail Gorbachev repudiated the doctrine in the late 1980s, as the Kremlin accepted the peaceful overthrow of Soviet rule in all its satellite countries in Eastern Europe.

The policy was first and most clearly outlined by Sergei Kovalev in a September 26, 1968 Pravda article entitled "Sovereignty and the International Obligations of Socialist Countries". Leonid Brezhnev reiterated it in a speech at the Fifth Congress of the Polish United Workers' Party on November 13, 1968, which stated: "When forces that are hostile to socialism try to turn the development of some socialist country towards capitalism, it becomes not only a problem of the country concerned, but a common problem and concern of all socialist countries."

This doctrine was announced to retroactively justify the invasion of Czechoslovakia in August 1968 that ended the Prague Spring, along with earlier Soviet military interventions, such as the invasion of Hungary in 1956. These interventions were meant to put an end to liberalization efforts and uprisings that had the potential to compromise Soviet hegemony inside the Soviet Bloc, which was considered by the Soviet Union to be an essential and defensive and strategic buffer in case hostilities with NATO were to break out.

In practice, the policy meant that only limited independence of the satellite states' communist parties was allowed and that none would be allowed to compromise the cohesiveness of the Eastern Bloc in any way. That is, no country could leave the Warsaw Pact or disturb a ruling communist party's monopoly on power. Implicit in this doctrine was that the leadership of the Soviet Union reserved, for itself, the power to define "socialism" and "capitalism". Following the announcement of the Brezhnev Doctrine, numerous treaties were signed between the Soviet Union and its satellite states to reassert these points and to further ensure inter-state cooperation. The principles of the doctrine were so broad that the Soviets even used it to justify their military intervention in the communist (but non-Warsaw Pact) nation of Afghanistan in 1979. The Brezhnev Doctrine stayed in effect until it was ended with the Soviet reaction to the Polish crisis of 1980–1981.

Mikhail Gorbachev refused to use military force when Poland held free elections in 1989 and Solidarity defeated the Polish United Workers' Party. It was superseded by the facetiously named Sinatra Doctrine in 1989, alluding to the Frank Sinatra song "My Way". The refusal to intervene in the emancipation of the Eastern European satellite states and the Pan-European Picnic then led to the fall of the Iron Curtain and the largely peaceful collapse of the Eastern Bloc.

== Origins ==
=== 1956 Hungarian Revolution and Soviet invasion ===
The period between 1953 and 1968 was saturated with dissidence and reformation within the Soviet satellite states. 1953 saw the death of Soviet Leader Joseph Stalin, followed closely by Nikita Khrushchev's 1956 "Secret Speech" denouncing Stalin. This denouncement of the former leader led to a period of the Soviet Era known commonly as "De-Stalinization." Under the blanket reforms of this process, Imre Nagy came to power in Hungary as the new prime minister, taking over for Mátyás Rákosi. Almost immediately Nagy set out on a path of reform. Police power was reduced, collectivized farms were split up and being returned to individual peasants, industry and food production shifted and religious tolerance was becoming more prominent. These reforms shocked the Hungarian Communist Party. Nagy was quickly overthrown by Rákosi in 1955, and stripped of his positions. Shortly after this coup, Khrushchev signed the Belgrade Declaration which stated "separate paths to socialism were permissible within the Soviet Bloc." With hopes for serious reform just having been extinguished in Hungary, this declaration was not received well by the Hungarians. Tensions quickly mounted in Hungary with demonstrations and calls for not only the withdrawal of Soviet troops, but for a Hungarian withdrawal from the Warsaw Pact as well. By October 23 Soviet forces landed in Budapest. A chaotic and bloody suppression of revolutionary forces lasted from October 24 until November 7, ending with thousands of Hungarians murdered and many more fleeing the country. Although order was restored, tensions remained on both sides of the conflict. Hungarians resented the end of the reformation, and the Soviets wanted to avoid a similar crisis from occurring again anywhere in the Soviet Bloc.

=== A peaceful Brezhnev Doctrine ===
When the Hungarian Revolution of 1956 was suppressed, the Soviets adopted the mindset that governments supporting both communism and capitalism must coexist, and more importantly, build relations. This idea stressed that all people are equal, and own the right to solve the problems of their own countries themselves, and that in order for both states to peacefully coexist, neither country can exercise the right to get involved in each other's internal affairs. While this idea was brought up following the events of Hungary, they were not put into effect for a great deal of time. This is further explained in the Renunciation section.

=== 1968 Prague Spring ===
Notions of reform had been slowly growing in Czechoslovakia since the early-mid 1960s. However, once the Stalinist President Antonín Novotný resigned as head of the Communist Party of Czechoslovakia in January 1968, the Prague Spring began to take shape. Alexander Dubček replaced Novotný as head of the party, initially thought a friend to the Soviet Union. It was not long before Dubček began making serious liberal reforms. In an effort to establish what Dubček called "developed socialism", he instituted changes in Czechoslovakia to create a much more free and liberal version of the socialist state. Aspects of a market economy were implemented, travel restrictions were eased for citizens, state censorship loosened, the power of the StB secret police was limited, and steps were taken to improve relations with the west. As the reforms piled up, the Kremlin quickly grew uneasy as they hoped to not only preserve their power within Czechoslovakia, but to avoid another Hungarian-style revolution as well. Soviet panic compounded in March 1968 when student protests erupted in Poland and Antonín Novotný resigned as the Czechoslovak president. On March 21, Yuri Andropov, the KGB Chairman, issued a grave statement concerning the reforms taking place under Dubček. "The methods and forms by which the work is progressing in Czechoslovakia remind one very much of Hungary. In this outward appearance of chaos…there is a certain order. It all began like this in Hungary also, but then came the first and second echelons, and then, finally the social democrats."

Leonid Brezhnev sought clarification from Dubček on March 21, with the Politburo convened, on the situation in Czechoslovakia. Eager to avoid a similar fate as Imre Nagy, Dubček reassured Brezhnev that the reforms were totally under control and not on a similar path to those seen in 1956 in Hungary. Despite Dubček's assurances, other Soviet allies grew uneasy by the reforms taking place in an Eastern European neighbor. The First Secretary of the Ukrainian Communist Party called on Moscow for an immediate invasion of Czechoslovakia in order to stop Dubček's "socialism with a human face" from spreading into the Ukrainian SSR and sparking unrest. By May 6, Brezhnev condemned Dubček's system, declaring it a step toward "the complete collapse of the Warsaw Pact." After three months of negotiations, agreements, and rising tensions between Moscow and Czechoslovakia, the Soviet/Warsaw Pact invasion began on the night of August 20, 1968, which was to be met with great Czechoslovak discontent and resistance for many months into 1970.

== Formation of the Doctrine ==
Brezhnev realized the need for a shift from Nikita Khrushchev's idea of "different paths to socialism" towards one that fostered a more unified vision throughout the socialist camp. "Economic integration, political consolidation, a return to ideological orthodoxy, and inter-Party cooperation became the new watchwords of Soviet bloc relations." On November 12, 1968, Brezhnev stated that "[w]hen external and internal forces hostile to socialism try to turn the development of a given socialist country in the direction of … the capitalist system ... this is no longer merely a problem for that country's people, but a common problem, the concern of all socialist countries." Brezhnev's statement at the Fifth Congress of the Polish United Workers' Party effectively classified the issue of sovereignty as less important than the preservation of Soviet-style socialism. While no new doctrine had been officially announced, it was clear that Soviet intervention was imminent if Moscow perceived any satellite to be at risk of jeopardizing the Soviet hegemony.

== Brezhnev Doctrine in practice ==
The vague, broad nature of the Brezhnev Doctrine allowed application to any international situation the USSR saw fit. This is clearly evident not only through the Prague Spring in 1968, and the indirect pressure on Poland from 1980 to 1981, but also in the Soviet involvement in Afghanistan starting in the 1970s. Any instance which caused the USSR to question whether or not a country was becoming a "risk to international socialism", the use of military intervention was, in Soviet eyes, not only justified, but necessary.

=== Invasion of Afghanistan in 1979 ===
The Soviet government's desire to link its foreign policy to the Brezhnev Doctrine was evoked again when it ordered a military intervention in Afghanistan in 1979. This was perhaps the last chapter of this doctrine's saga.

In April 1978, a coup in Kabul brought the Afghan Communist Party to power with Nur Muhammad Taraki being installed as the second president of Afghanistan. The previous president, Mohammed Daoud Khan was killed during the coup. The Saur Revolution (as the coup was known) took Moscow by surprise, who preferred that the pro-Soviet Daoud Khan stay in power. The previous regime had maintained a pro-Soviet foreign policy as Daoud Khan was a Pashtun who rejected the Durand Line as the frontier with Pakistan. The Afghan Communist Party was divided into a factional struggle between factions known as the Khalq and Parcham. The Parcham was the more moderate of the two factions, arguing that Afghanistan was not ready for socialism, requiring more gradual process while the ultra-Communist Khalq favored a more radical approach. The Khalq faction was victorious and the leader of the Pacham faction Babrak Karmal fled to Moscow in fear of his life, to take up the position as Afghan ambassador in Moscow.

Islamic fundamentalists took issue with the Communist party in power. As a result, a jihad was proclaimed against the Communist government. Brezhnev and other Soviet leaders falsely portrayed the United States as the one behind the jihad in Afghanistan, and the rebellion in Afghanistan was seen in Moscow not so much in the context of Afghan politics with an unpopular government pursuing policies that much of the population rejected (such as the collectivisation of agriculture), but rather in the context of the Cold War, being seen as the first stage of an alleged American plot to instigate a jihad in Soviet Central Asia where the majority of the population was Muslim. To assist the government, the Soviet Union drastically increased its military aid to Afghanistan while sending Soviet advisers to train the Afghan military.

Following a split in the Communist Party, the leader of the Khalq faction, Hafizullah Amin, overthrew President Nur Muhammad Taraki and had him murdered on 8 October 1979. Soviet diplomats in Kabul had a low opinion of Taraki's ability to handle the rebellion, and an even lower one of Amin, who was regarded as a fanatic, but incompetent leader who lost control of the situation. In the fall of 1979, the leaders who pressed the most strongly for an invasion of Afghanistan to replace the incompetent Amin with Karmal, who was the man better able to preserve the communist regime's existence, were the Foreign Minister Andrei Gromyko, the Chairman of KGB, Yuri Andropov and the Defense Minister Marshal Dmitry Ustinov. The intervention as envisioned in Moscow was merely a short conflict to stabilize the situation and allow the Communist regime to regain power. Brezhnev was indecisive, fearing that an occupation of Afghanistan might not be the short war that Gromyko, Ustinov and Andropov kept insisting it would be, but was fearful of the possibility of an Islamic fundamentalist regime being established that would export Islam into Soviet Central Asia. As it was, the inability and unwillingness of much of the Soviet-controlled Afghan Army to fight led the Soviets to involve themselves in Afghanistan for almost 10 years. Ironically, despite what was being feared in Moscow, the United States was not supporting the Islamic fundamentalist rebellion in Afghanistan, and only started to support the mujahideen ("warriors of Allah") with weapons after the Soviet invasion, concentrating foreign policy matters in the form of linkage towards preventing Soviet expansion.

During his talks with the Soviets during his time as Ambassador, Karmal coordinated with the Soviet government to replace Amin. It was this coordination that led to both Soviet soldiers and airborne units organizing a coup against the Amin-led Afghanistan government, during which Amin was assassinated. In his place, the Soviets installed their ally, former-Ambassador Babrak Karmal, as the new lead of the government in Afghanistan.

The Soviet Union, once again, fell back to the Brezhnev Doctrine for rationale, claiming that it was both morally and politically justified. It was also explained by the Soviets that they owed help to their friend and ally Babrak Karmal.

== Renunciation ==
The long lasting struggle of the war in Afghanistan made the Soviets realize that their reach and influence was in fact limited. "[The war in Afghanistan] had shown that socialist internationalism and Soviet national interests were not always compatible." Tensions between the USSR and Czechoslovakia since 1968, as well as Poland in 1980, proved the inefficiencies inherent in the Brezhnev Doctrine. The Solidarity trade union protests in Poland were suppressed without outside intervention, leaving the Brezhnev doctrine effectively dead. Although the Kremlin wanted to preserve communism in its satellites, the decision was not to intervene. Gorbachev's Glasnost and Perestroika finally opened the door for Soviet Bloc countries and republics to make reforms without fear of Soviet intervention. When East Germany desperately asked for Soviet troops to put down growing unrest in 1989, Gorbachev flatly refused.

== Post-Brezhnev Doctrine ==
The abandonment of the doctrine had a major effect on the way that the Soviets dealt with countries they once tried to control. The new Sinatra doctrine allowed other countries that were oppressed under communist intervention, to go about their own political reform. This carried over internally as well. In fact, the Soviet Union's biggest problem after the removal of the Brezhnev Doctrine, was the Khrushchev Dilemma. This did not address how to stop internal political reform, but how to tame the physical violence that comes along with it. It had become clear that the Soviet Union was beginning to loosen up.

It is possible to pinpoint the renouncement of the Brezhnev Doctrine as a factor in the dissolution of the Soviet Union. Countries that were once micromanaged now could do what they wanted to politically, because the Soviets could no longer try to conquer where they saw fit. With that, the Soviet Union began to collapse. While the communist agenda had caused infinite problems for other countries, it was the driving force behind the Soviet Union staying together. After all, it seems that the removal of the incentive to conquer, and forcing of communism upon other nations, defeated the one thing Soviet Russia had always been about, the expansion of Communism.

With the fall of the Brezhnev Doctrine came the fall of the Warsaw Pact, and – perhaps the critical moment for the future of the Soviet Union – the fall of the Berlin Wall that had prevented the migration of East Germans to West Germany. The Brezhnev Doctrine coming to a close therefore represented the beginning of the end for one of the strongest, if shortlived empires in the world's history, the Soviet Union.

== In other Communist countries ==
The Soviet Union was not the only Communist country to intervene militarily in fellow countries. Vietnam deposed the Khmer Rouge in the Cambodian–Vietnamese War of 1978, which was followed by a revenge Chinese invasion of Vietnam in the Sino-Vietnamese War of 1979.

== See also ==
- Captive Nations – Cold War term used in United States Public Law 86–90
- Imperialism – Extension of rule over foreign nations
- Monroe Doctrine – 1823 U.S. foreign policy on the Western Hemisphere
- Truman Doctrine – Anti-Soviet U.S. Cold War foreign policy
- Russian-occupied territories – Ongoing military occupations by Russia since 1991
- Satellite state – Country which is nominally sovereign but under extensive influence from a larger state
- Soviet empire – Term for Soviet foreign policy before 1989
- Soviet occupations – Soviet military occupations (1939-1991)
- Sovietization – Adoption of Soviet political system and mentality
- Tankie – Pejorative term for authoritarian communists
- Ulbricht Doctrine – East German diplomatic doctrine, Cold War
- Western betrayal – Concept in international relations among European countries

== Bibliography ==
- Freedman, Lawrence, and Jeffrey Michaels. "Soviet Doctrine from Brezhnev to Gorbachev." in The Evolution of Nuclear Strategy (Palgrave Macmillan, London, 2019) pp. 527–542.
- Glazer, Stephen G. (1971). "The Brezhnev Doctrine". The International Lawyer. 5 (1): 169–179.
- Gompert, David C.; Binnendijk, Hans; Lin, Bonny (2014). Blinders, Blunders, and Wars: What America and China Can Learn. Santa Monica: Rand Corporation..
- Hunt, Lynn. The Making of the West: Peoples and Cultures (Bedford/St. Martin's, Boston and London. 2009).
- Jones, Robert A. The Soviet Concept of 'Limited Sovereignty' from Lenin to Gorbachev: The Brezhnev Doctrine (Springer, 2016).
- Kemp-Welch, Anthony. "Poland and the Brezhnev Doctrine (1968–1989)." Wolność i Solidarność 10 (2017): 155–223. online in English
- Kramer, Mark (1989). "Beyond the Brezhnev Doctrine: A New Era in Soviet-East European Relations?". International Security. 14 (3): 25–67. doi:10.2307/2538931. JSTOR 2538931. S2CID 153951685.
- Kramer, Mark. "The Kremlin, the Prague Spring, and the Brezhnev Doctrine." in Promises of 1968 (2010) pp: 285–370. online
- Lesaffer, Randall. "Brezhnev Doctrine." in The Encyclopedia of Diplomacy (2018) pp: 1–5.
- Loth, Wilfried. "Moscow, Prague and Warsaw: Overcoming the Brezhnev Doctrine." Cold War History 1.2 (2001): 103–118.
- Mitchell, R. Judson. "The Brezhnev doctrine and communist ideology." The Review of Politics 34.2 (1972): 190–209. online
- Ouimet, Matthew: The Rise and Fall of the Brezhnev Doctrine in Soviet Foreign Policy. University of North Carolina Press, Chapel Hill and London. 2003.
- Pravda, September 25, 1968; translated by Novosti, Soviet press agency. Reprinted in L. S. Stavrianos, The Epic of Man (Englewood Cliffs, N.J.: Prentice Hall, 1971), pp. 465–466.
- Rostow, N. (1981). "Law and the use of force by states: The Brezhnev Doctrine". Yale Journal of International Law. 7 (2): 209–243.
- Schwebel, Stephen M. (1972). "The Brezhnev Doctrine Repealed and Peaceful Co-Existence Enacted". The American Journal of International Law. 66 (5): 816–819. doi:10.2307/2198512. JSTOR 2198512. S2CID 246003045.
- Valenta, Jiri. "Soviet Decisionmaking on Afghanistan, 1979." im Soviet Decisionmaking for National Security (Routledge, 2021) pp. 218–236.
