= William Bernstein Schwartz Jr. =

American businessman

4th United States Ambassador to the Bahamas
- In office October 11, 1977 – January 31, 1981
- President: Jimmy Carter; Ronald Reagan
- Preceded by: Jack B. Olson
- Succeeded by: Lev Dobriansky

Personal details
- Born: November 14, 1921 Atlanta, Georgia
- Died: May 18, 2010 (aged 88) Atlanta, Georgia
- Party: Democratic

William Bernstein Schwartz Jr. (November 14, 1921 – May 18, 2010) was an American businessman who served as the United States Ambassador to the Bahamas from 1977 to 1981.

Schwartz died on May 18, 2010, in Atlanta, Georgia, at the age of 88.
