= National Captive Nations Committee =

Public Law 86-90 which establishes Captive Nations Week

The National Captive Nations Committee (NCNC) is an anti-communism advocacy group based in Washington, D.C. It was established in 1959 according to Pub. L. 86–90 by President Dwight D. Eisenhower, which introduced the Captive Nations Week, with the purpose to maintain the Captive Nations List. The founder and long-time chairman of NCNC was Lev Dobriansky, who wrote the original Captive Nations Resolution, which was signed into Public Law 86–90. The local captive nations committees were often allied with the Banderite wing of the Organization of Ukrainian Nationalists; for example, the Washington DC committee was chaired by the local OUN head.

The activities of the NCNC include sponsoring the Captive Nations Award and the annual Captive Nations Week.

In 1993, Section 905 of the Public Law 103-199 authorized the NCNC to establish an organization, the Victims of Communism Memorial Foundation, to construct, maintain, and operate the Victims of Communism Memorial in Washington, D.C.

Records of the activities of the NCNC from 1970-1982 (correspondence, clippings, photographs, books, etc.) were donated by Dobriansky to Syracuse University.
