= Museum of Soviet occupation =

Museum of Soviet occupation may refer to:

- Museum of Soviet Occupation, Kyiv (Ukraine)
- Museum of Soviet Occupation (Tbilisi) (Georgia)

== See also ==
- Museum of the Occupation of Latvia
- Museum of Occupations and Freedom Fights (Lithuania)
- Muzeul Memoriei Neamului (Moldova)
- Vabamu Museum of Occupations and Freedom (Estonia)
