= Congress of Russian Americans =

US non-governmental organization

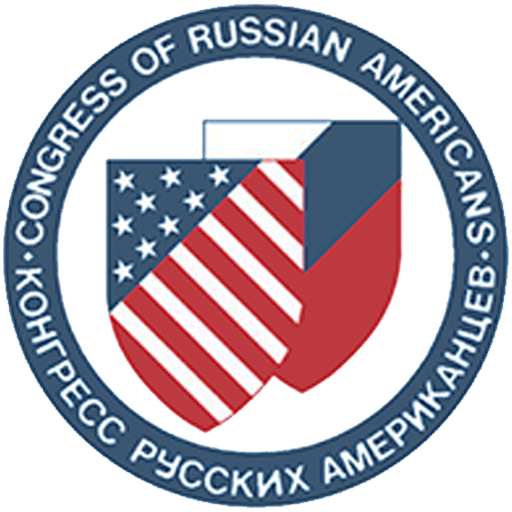
- Founded: 1973
- Headquarters: San Francisco, California, United States
- President: Natalie Sabelnik
- Website: russian-americans.org

The Congress of Russian Americans is a non-governmental organization in the United States representing Russian-Americans and Russians. The CRA's stated purposes include preserving Russian culture in the United States, protecting the rights of Russian-Americans, fighting Russophobia, and improving relations between Russians and Americans.

== History ==
The Congress of Russian Americans (CRA) was founded in 1973 by Russian immigrants to the United States, including White émigrés from the Russian Empire, who were opposed to communism. The CRA's original intention was to prevent Russophobia from being the basis of Western anti-communism during the Cold War by advocating the distinction between the Russian national identity and Soviet communist ideology. In 1978, the Russian-American Chamber of Fame was founded to honor Russian immigrants who provided outstanding contributions to American science and culture, including the television pioneer Vladimir K. Zworykin, the 1973 Economics Nobel laureate Wassily Leontief, the founder of Tolstoy Foundation Alexandra Tolstaya, and many other notable Russian Americans.

Since the dissolution of the Soviet Union in 1991, the CRA has extended its goals to include encouraging cultural and economic development in Russia and aiding persecuted Christians and human rights activists in the former Soviet states.

The Congress of Russian Americans is headquartered in San Francisco, California, and maintains a liaison office in Washington, DC, to interact with the US government and other organizations. The CRA's known initiatives include attempts to nullify the law on Captive Nations, which it regards as anti-Russian, rather than anticommunist, since the list of "captive nations" did not include Russia albeit it was the first nation to fall to a communist regime. The CRA is also known for opposing the 2017 Countering America's Adversaries Through Sanctions Act and for criticizing the law as damaging to Russian-American relations and propagating Russophobia.

== Links ==
- Official website
