= Military occupations by the Soviet Union =

Soviet military occupations (1939-1991)

Soviet sphere of influence in Central and Eastern Europe with border changes resulting from invasion and military operations of World War II

During World War II, the Soviet Union occupied and annexed several countries allocated to it in the secret Molotov–Ribbentrop Pact of 1939. These included the eastern regions of Poland (incorporated into three different SSRs), as well as Latvia (became Latvian SSR), Estonia (became Estonian SSR), Lithuania (became Lithuanian SSR), part of eastern Finland (became Karelo-Finnish SSR) and eastern Romania (became the Moldavian SSR and part of Ukrainian SSR). Apart from the Molotov–Ribbentrop Pact and post-war division of Germany, the Soviets also occupied and annexed Carpathian Ruthenia from Czechoslovakia in 1945 (became part of Ukrainian SSR). These occupations lasted until the dissolution of the Soviet Union in 1990 and 1991.

Below is a list of various forms of military occupations by the Soviet Union resulting from both the Soviet pact with Nazi Germany (ahead of World War II), and the ensuing Cold War in the aftermath of Allied victory over Germany.

== Poland (1939–1956) ==
Poland was the first country to be occupied by the Soviet Union during World War II. The secret protocol of the Molotov–Ribbentrop pact stipulated Poland to be split between Soviet Union and Nazi Germany. In 1939, the total area of Polish territories occupied by the Soviet Union (including the area given to Lithuania and annexed in 1940 during the formation of Lithuanian SSR), was 201,015 square kilometres, with a population of 13.299 million, of which 5.274 million were ethnic Poles and 1.109 million were Jews.

After the end of World War II, the Soviet Union kept most of the territories it occupied in 1939, while territories with an area of 21,275 square kilometers with 1.5 million inhabitants were returned to communist-controlled Poland, notably the areas near Białystok and Przemyśl. In 1944–1947, over a million Poles were resettled from the annexed territories into Poland (mostly into the Regained Territories).

Soviet troops (the Northern Group of Forces) were stationed in Poland from 1945 until 1993. It was only in 1956 that official agreements between the communist regime in Poland established by the Soviets themselves and the Soviet Union recognized the presence of those troops; hence some Polish scholars accept the usage of the term 'occupation' for the period spanning 1945–1956. The Polish government-in-exile existed until 1990.

== Baltic states (1940–1991) ==
Estonia, Latvia, and Lithuania had been independent nations since 1918, when all three countries were occupied by the Red Army in June 1940 and formally annexed into the USSR in August 1940. Given a free hand by Nazi Germany via the German–Soviet Nonaggression Pact and its secret additional protocol of August 1939, the Soviet Union pressured the three countries to accept its military bases in September 1939. In the case of refusal, the USSR effected an air and naval blockade and threatened to attack immediately with hundreds of thousands of troops massed upon the border. The Soviet military forces overtook the political systems of these countries in June 1940 and installed puppet regimes after rigged elections in July 1940.

The sovietisation was interrupted by the German occupation in 1941–1944. The Baltic Offensive re-established the Soviet control in 1944–1945, and resumed sovietisation, mostly completed by 1950. The forced collectivisation of agriculture began in 1947, and was completed after the mass deportation in March 1949. Private farms were confiscated, and farmers were made to join the collective farms. An armed resistance movement of 'forest brothers' was active until the mid-1950s. Hundreds of thousands participated or supported the movement; tens of thousands were killed. The Soviet authorities fighting the forest brothers also suffered hundreds of deaths. Some innocent civilians were killed on both sides. In addition, a number of underground nationalist schoolchildren groups were active. Most of their members were sentenced to long terms of imprisonment. The punitive actions decreased rapidly after Joseph Stalin's death in 1953; from 1956 to 1958, a large part of the deportees and political prisoners were allowed to return.

During the occupation, the Soviet authorities killed, politically arrested, unlawfully drafted, and deported hundreds of thousands of people. Numerous other kind of crimes against humanity were committed all through the occupation period. Furthermore, trying to enforce the ideals of Communism, the authorities deliberately dismantled the existing social and economic structures, and imposed new "ideologically pure" hierarchies. This severely retarded the Baltic economies. For example, Estonian scientists have estimated economic damages directly attributable to the post-World War II occupation to hundreds of billions of US dollars (several dozens worth of Estonia's 2006 GDP of $21.28 billion).

After all, the attempt to integrate the Estonian society into the Soviet system failed. Although the armed resistance was defeated, the population remained anti-Soviet. This helped the Estonians to organise a new resistance movement in the late 1980s, regain their independence in 1991, and then rapidly develop a modern society.

Notwithstanding the annexation by the Soviet Union in 1940, it is therefore correct to speak of the occupation of the Baltic states, referring in particular to the absence of Soviet legal title. The prolonged occupation was an unorthodox one. Until 1991, the status of the three countries resembled the classical occupation in important ways: external control by an internationally unsanctioned force and a conflict of interest between the foreign power and the inhabitants. However, in other aspects the situation was very different from a classical occupation. Both the fact of the incorporation of the Baltic states to the USSR as Soviet republics without qualification, and the long duration of the Soviet rule challenge the applicability of all rules on occupation from the practical point of view. Despite the fact of annexation, the presence of the USSR in the Baltic states remained an occupation sui generis.

Although the Soviet Union condemned the Molotov–Ribbentrop Pact—the immediate forerunner to the occupation—it is currently the policy of the USSR's legal successor Russian Federation to deny that the events constituted occupation or were illegal under applicable (international) laws.

== Finnish territories (1940) ==
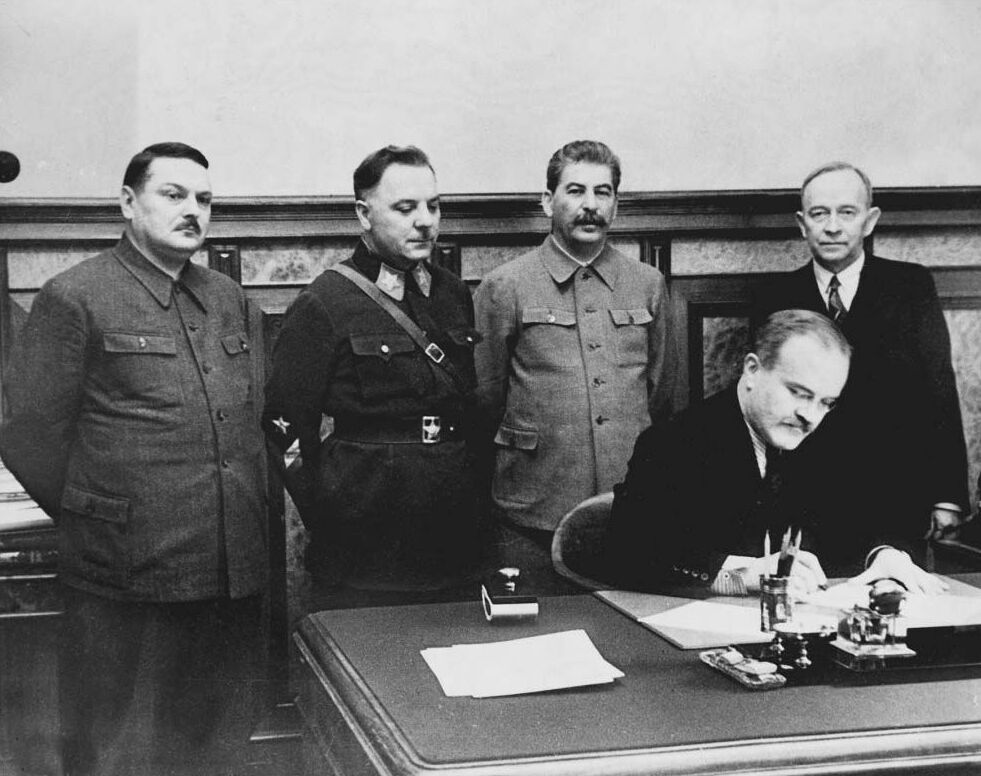
Molotov signing a deal between the Soviet Union and the short-lived puppet state Finnish Democratic Republic, which existed on occupied territories during the Winter War.

After the Baltic states agreed to Soviet demands in September and October 1939, the Soviets turned their attention to Finland. The Soviet Union demanded territories on the Karelian Isthmus, the islands of the Gulf of Finland, a military base near the Finnish capital, and the destruction of all defensive fortifications on the Karelian Isthmus. Finland refused these demands. On 30 November 1939 the Soviet Union thus invaded the country, initiating the Winter War with the goal of annexing Finland. The USSR set up the Finnish Democratic Republic, a short-lived Soviet puppet regime in the occupied town of Terijoki. The Soviets also occupied the Petsamo municipality in the Barents Sea coast during the war.

The Winter War ended on 13 March 1940 with the signing of the Moscow Peace Treaty. Finland retained its independence but ceded parts of Karelia, Salla, the Rybachy Peninsula in the Barents Sea, and four islands in the Gulf of Finland The land accounted for 9% of the country's territory, included the important city of Viipuri, and much of Finland's industry. About 422,000 Karelians — 12% of Finland's population — chose to evacuate beyond the new border and lose their homes rather than become Soviet subjects. The military troops and the remaining civilians were hastily evacuated.

When the hostilities resumed in 1941, Finnish forces retook the lost areas and then advanced further up to the Svir River and Lake Onega before the end of the year. In the Soviet offensive of 1944 against the Finns the Red Army advance was halted by the Finns before reaching the 1940 border or, in the sole case where it did happen, the Red Army was promptly thrown back in the Battle of Ilomantsi. In the negotiations that followed, the Finns ceded the Petsamo municipality to the Soviet Union in the Moscow Armistice.

== Bessarabia and Northern Bukovina (1940) ==
The Soviet Union, which did not recognize the sovereignty of Romania over Bessarabia since the union of 1918, issued an ultimatum on 28 June 1940 demanding the evacuation of the Romanian military and administration from the territory it contested as well as from the northern part of the Romanian province of Bukovina. Under pressure from Moscow and Berlin, the Romanian administration and armed forces retreated to avoid war. Adolf Hitler used Soviet occupation of Bessarabia as justification for German occupation of Yugoslavia and Greece and German attack on USSR.

== After the Soviet Union entered the war on the Allied side ==
Map of the Eastern Bloc

On 22 June 1941, the Operation Barbarossa commenced, which gave a start of the Eastern front. German-led European Axis countries and Finland invaded the USSR, thereby terminating the German-Soviet non-aggression treaty. During the hostilities between the Soviet Union and the Axis, which led to the total military defeat of the latter, the USSR fully or partially occupied the territory of Germany and its satellites, as well as the territories of some German-occupied states and Austria. Some of them became Soviet Satellite states, namely, the People's Republic of Poland, the People's Republic of Hungary, the Czechoslovak Socialist Republic, the Romanian People's Republic, the People's Republic of Bulgaria, the People's Republic of Albania; later, East Germany was formed based on the Soviet zone of German occupation.

=== Iran (1941–1946) ===
On 25 August 1941 British and Commonwealth forces and the Soviet Union jointly invaded Iran. The purpose of the invasion (codenamed Operation Countenance) was to secure Iranian oil fields and ensure supply lines (see Persian Corridor) for the Soviets fighting against European Axis countries on the Eastern Front. The Soviet Union would go on to set up the Azerbaijan People's Government in Iranian Azerbaijan while just occupying the rest of north Iran.

=== Hungary (1944–1991) ===
Soviet occupation of Hungary
- Soviet military occupation
- 1944–1947
- Flag Coat of arms

- Capital: Budapest
- Government
  - Type: Military administration
- Soviet military commander
  - 1944–1945: Semyon Timoshenko
  - 1945–1947: Kliment Voroshilov
- Historical era: Second World War
  - Soviet troops enter: 23 September 1944
  - Fall of Budapest: 13 February 1945
  - Paris Peace Treaties: 15 September 1947
Preceded by	Succeeded by
German occupation of Hungary	Second Hungarian Republic

In July 1941, the Kingdom of Hungary, a member of the Tripartite Pact, took part in Operation Barbarossa, in alliance with Nazi Germany. Hungarian forces fought shoulder to shoulder with the Wehrmacht and advanced through the Ukrainian SSR deep into Russia, all the way to Stalingrad. However, by the end of 1942 the Soviet Red Army began pushing back the Wehrmacht through a series of offensives that preceded the Red Army's encroachment upon Hungarian territory in 1943–44. In September 1944 Soviet forces crossed into Hungary, launching the Budapest Offensive. As the Hungarian army ignored the armistice with the USSR signed by the government of Miklós Horthy on 15 October 1944, the Soviets fought their way further westward against the Hungarian troops and their German allies capturing the capital on 13 February 1945. Operations continued until early April 1945, when the last German forces and their remaining loyal Hungarian troops were routed out of the country.

Stalin's regime made sure that a loyal post-war government dominated by Communists was installed in the country before transferring authority from the occupational force to the Hungarian authorities. The presence of Soviet troops in Hungary was regulated by the 1949 mutual assistance treaty concluded between the Soviet and Hungarian governments.

The Hungarian Revolution of 1956 was a spontaneous nationwide revolt against the Communist government of Hungary and its Soviet-imposed policies. The Soviet Politburo announced or pretended a willingness to negotiate the withdrawal of Soviet forces in Hungary. On 1 November 1956, Hungarian Prime Minister Imre Nagy declared Hungary's withdrawal from the Warsaw Pact. On 4 November 1956, a large joint military force of the Warsaw Pact led by the Khrushchev regime entered Budapest to crush the resistance, killing thousands of civilians in the process. About 200,000 Hungarians fled across the border to Austria, the only border of Hungary to the Western world.

On 19 June 1991, half a year before the dissolution of the Soviet Union, the last Soviet soldier left Hungary.

=== Romania (1944–1958) ===
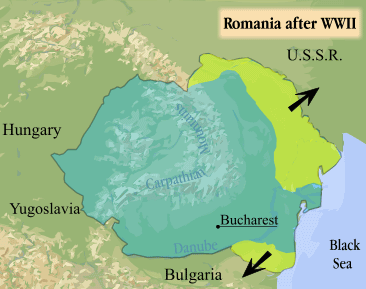
Map of Romania after World War II indicating lost territories.

The Soviet's second Jassy–Kishinev Offensive led to defeat of Romania, subsequent royal coup d'état, and the switch of Romania from the Axis to the Allies. Soviet troops were stationed in Romania from 1944 to 1958. On 12 September 1944, with the Red Army already controlling much of Romania's territory, an Armistice Agreement between Romania and the USSR was signed, under which Romania retroceded the territory it administered earlier in the war, and subjected itself to an 'allied commission' consisting of the Stalin Regime, the United States, and the United Kingdom. On the ground, it was the Soviet military command, and not the Western allies, that de facto exercised dominant authority. The presence and free movement of Soviet troops was explicitly stipulated in the agreement.

The terms of the Armistice Agreement ceased on 15 September 1947 as the conditions of the Paris Peace Treaties, 1947 entered into force. The new treaty stipulated the withdrawal of all Allied forces from Romania - with the important exemption that such withdrawal was "subject to the right of the Soviet Union to keep on Romanian territory such armed forces as it may need for the maintenance of the lines of communication of the Soviet Army with the Soviet zone of occupation in Austria."

In the aftermath of the agreement the Soviet presence fell from 130,000 troops (the peak in 1947) to approximately 30,000. In March 1953, Stalin died. On 25 February 1956, Khrushchev delivered his report to the 20th Congress of the Communist Party of the Soviet Union. The Khrushchev thaw began and the Soviet troops were fully withdrawn by August 1958.

Comparing the Soviet occupation of Romania to that of Bulgaria, David Stone noted in 2006: "Unlike Bulgaria, Romania had few cultural and historical ties with Russia, and had actually waged war on the Soviet Union. As a result, Soviet occupation weighted heavier on the Romanian people, and the troops themselves were less disciplined."

=== Bulgaria (1944–1947) ===
On 5 September 1944, the Soviet Union declared war on Bulgaria and on 8 September invaded the country, without encountering resistance. By the next day Soviets occupied the northeastern part of Bulgaria along with the key port city of Varna. On 8 September 1944 Bulgaria declared war against Nazi Germany. Garrison detachments with Zveno officers at the head overthrew the government on the eve of 9 September, after taking strategic keypoints in Sofia and arresting the ministers. A new government of the Fatherland Front was appointed on 9 September with Kimon Georgiev as prime minister. Soviet troops were withdrawn in 1947.

=== Czechoslovakia (1944–1945) ===
Soviet occupation of Czechoslovakia
- Soviet military occupation
- 1944–1945
- Flag Coat of arms

- Capital: Prague
- Government
  - Type: Military administration
- Historical era: Second World War
  - Established: 16 May 1944
  - Disestablished: 1 December 1945
Preceded by	Succeeded by
Protectorate of Bohemia and Moravia	Third Czechoslovak Republic

In the fall of 1944 when the north and eastern parts of Carpathian Ruthenia were captured by the Red Army, the Czechoslovak government delegation led by minister František Němec arrived in Khust to establish the provisional Czechoslovak administration, according to the treaties between the Soviet and Czechoslovak governments from the same year. However, after a few weeks, the Red Army and the NKVD started to obstruct the delegation's work and the "National committee of Transcarpatho-Ukraine" was set up in Mukachevo under the protection of the Red Army. On 26 November this committee, led by Ivan Turyanytsia (a Rusyn who deserted from the Czechoslovak army) proclaimed the will of Ukrainian people to separate from Czechoslovakia and join the Soviet Ukraine. After two months of conflicts and negotiations the Czechoslovak government delegation departed from Khust on 1 February 1945, leaving the Carpathian Ukraine under Soviet control. After World War II, on 29 June 1945, a treaty was signed between Czechoslovakia and the Soviet Union, ceding Carpatho-Ukraine officially to the Soviet Union.

Following the capture of Prague by the Red Army in May 1945 the Soviets withdrew in December 1945 as part of an agreement that all Soviet and US troops leave the country.

=== Northern Norway (1944–1945) and Bornholm, Denmark (1945–1946) ===
Soviet troops occupied northern Norway (the area around the far northern town of Kirkenes) from 1944 to 1945, and also from 1945 to 1946 the Danish island of Bornholm, strategically situated at the Baltic sea entrance. Stalin's intent was to attempt to gain bases at these locations late in the war. The Soviet deputy ambassador suggested seizing Bornholm in March 1945 and on 4 May the Baltic Fleet was ordered to seize the island.

Bornholm was heavily bombarded by Soviet forces in May 1945. Gerhard von Kamptz, the German superior officer in charge failed to provide a written capitulation as demanded by the Soviet commanders, several Soviet aircraft relentlessly bombed and destroyed more than 800 civilian houses in Rønne and Nexø and seriously damaged roughly 3000 more during 7–8 May 1945. On 9 May, Soviet troops landed on the island and after a short fight the German garrison did surrender. Soviet forces left the island on 5 April 1946.

=== Eastern Germany (1945–1949) ===
Soviet occupation zone of Germany was the area of eastern Germany occupied by the Soviet Union from 1945 on. In 1949 it became The German Democratic Republic known in English as East Germany.

In 1955 the Republic was declared by the Soviet Union to be fully sovereign; however, Soviet troops remained, based on the four-power Potsdam agreement. As NATO troops remained in West Berlin and West Germany, the GDR and Berlin in particular became focal points of Cold War tensions.

A separation barrier between West and East Germany, the Berlin Wall known in the Soviet Union and in East Germany as the "Anti-Fascist Protective Rampart," was built in 1961.

The Treaty on the Final Settlement With Respect to Germany signed in Moscow, mandated the withdrawal of all Soviet forces from Germany by the end of 1994. Conclusion of the final settlement cleared the way for unification of East and West Germany. Formal political union occurred on 3 October 1990.

One result of the occupation was children fathered by Russian soldiers either through romantic relationships, relationships of convenience or rape. These children experienced societal discrimination for decades, but after the troops' withdrawal and the development of perestroika, some of these "Lost Red Army Children" made public attempts to discover more about their Russian fathers.

=== Austria (1945–1955) ===
Occupation zones in Austria

The Soviet occupation of Austria lasted from 1945 to 1955. At the end of the war, Austria and Vienna were divided into 4 zones of occupation, following the terms of the Potsdam Conference. The Soviet Union expropriated over 450 businesses, formerly German-owned, and established Administration for Soviet Property in Austria, or USIA. This accounted for less than 10% of the Austrian workforce at the peak in 1951, and less than 5% of the Austrian GDP at that time.

On 15 May 1955, the Austrian State Treaty was signed, officially establishing Austrian independence and sovereignty. The treaty was enacted on 27 July, and the last Allied troops left the country on 25 October.

=== Manchuria (1945–1946) ===
The Soviet invasion of Manchuria, or the Manchurian Strategic Offensive Operation (Манчжурская стратегическая наступательная операция, lit. Manchzhurskaya Strategicheskaya Nastupatelnaya Operaciya) as the Soviet named it, began on 9 August 1945 with the Soviet invasion of the Japanese puppet state of Manchukuo and was the largest campaign of the 1945 Soviet–Japanese War which resumed hostilities between Soviet Union and the Empire of Japan after more than 4 years of peace. Soviets gains on the continent were Manchukuo, Mengjiang (Inner Mongolia) and northern Korean Peninsula. The rapid defeat of Japan's Kwantung Army was a very significant factor in the Japanese surrender and the end of World War II, as Japan realized the Russians were willing and able to take the cost of invasion of its Home Islands, after their rapid conquest of Manchuria and southern Sakhalin.

=== Korea (1945–1948) ===
In August 1945, the Soviet Army established the Soviet Civil Administration to administer the country until a domestic regime could be established. Provisional committees were set up across the country putting Communists into key positions. In February 1946 a provisional government called the North Korean Provisional People's Committee was formed under Kim Il Sung. Soviet forces departed in 1948, and a few years later, in an attempt to unite Korea under Communist rule, the Korean War broke out.

=== Kuril Islands (1945) ===
After Japan accepted the Potsdam Declaration on 14 August 1945, and announced the termination of the war on 15 August 1945, the Soviet Union started the Invasion of the Kuril Islands, which took place between 18 August and 3 September, expelling the Japanese inhabitants two years later.

== Cold War ==
=== Hungarian Revolution of 1956 ===
Soviet occupation of Hungary
- Soviet military occupation
- 1956–1957
- Flag Coat of arms

- Capital: Budapest
- Government
  - Type: Military administration Puppet government
- Soviet military commander
  - 1956–1957: Ivan Konev
- Prime Minister
  - 1956–1957: János Kádár
- Historical era: Hungarian Revolution of 1956 Cold War
  - Operation Whirlwind: 4 November 1956
  - Status of forces agreement: 27 May 1957
  - Last Soviet troops leave: 19 June 1991
Preceded by	Succeeded by
Hungary	Hungary

The Hungarian Revolution of 1956 was a spontaneous nationwide revolt against the Communist government of Hungary and its Soviet-imposed policies. After announcing their willingness to negotiate the withdrawal of Soviet forces, the Soviet Politburo changed its mind and moved to crush the revolution. On 4 November 1956, a large joint military force of the Warsaw Pact, led by Moscow, entered Budapest to crush the armed resistance.

The Soviet intervention, codenamed "Operation Whirlwind", was launched by Marshal Ivan Konev. The five Soviet divisions stationed in Hungary before 23 October were augmented to a total strength of 17 divisions. The 8th Mechanized Army under command of Lieutenant General Hamazasp Babadzhanian and the 38th Army under command of Lieutenant General Hadzhi-Umar Mamsurov from the nearby Carpathian Military District were deployed to Hungary for the operation.

At 3:00 a.m. on 4 November, Soviet tanks penetrated Budapest along the Pest side of the Danube in two thrusts—one from the south, and one from the north—thus splitting the city in half. Armored units crossed into Buda, and at 4:25 a.m. fired the first shots at the army barracks on Budaõrsi road. Soon after, Soviet artillery and tank fire was heard in all districts of Budapest. Operation Whirlwind combined air strikes, artillery, and the coordinated tank-infantry action of 17 divisions. By 8:00 am organised defence of the city evaporated after the radio station was seized, and many defenders fell back to fortified positions. Hungarian civilians bore the brunt of the fighting, and it was often impossible for Soviet troops to differentiate military from civilian targets. For this reason, Soviet tanks often crept along main roads firing indiscriminately into buildings. Hungarian resistance was strongest in the industrial areas of Budapest, which were heavily targeted by Soviet artillery and air strikes. The last pocket of resistance called for ceasefire on 10 November. Over 2,500 Hungarians and 722 Soviet troops had been killed and thousands more were wounded.

=== Czechoslovakia (1968–1989) ===
In 1948, the Czech Communist Party won a large portion of the vote in Czechoslovak politics, leading to a communist period without immediate Soviet military presence. The 1950s were characterized as a repressive period in the country's history, but by the 1960s, the local socialist leadership had taken a course toward economic, social and political reforms. However, a number of significant Czech communists, together with the Czech security agency, conspired against limited introduction of market systems, personal freedoms, and renewal of civic associations (see Socialism with a human face) by leveraging Russian support towards strengthening Communist Party's positions.

Leonid Brezhnev, General Secretary of the Communist Party of the Soviet Union, reacted to these reforms by announcing the Brezhnev Doctrine, and on 21 August 1968, about 750,000 Warsaw Pact troops, mostly from the Soviet Union, Poland, Bulgaria and Hungary, with tanks and machine guns occupied Czechoslovakia, deported thousands of people and rapidly derailed all reforms. Most large cities were individually invaded and overtaken; however, the invasion's primary attention focused on Prague, particularly the state organs, Czech television and radio.

The Czechoslovak government held an emergency session, and loudly expressed its disagreement with the occupation. Many citizens joined in protests, and by September 1968 at least 72 people had died and hundreds more injured in the conflicts. In the brief time after the occupation, which had put an end to any hope that Prague Spring had created, about 100,000 people fled Czechoslovakia. Over the whole time of the occupation, more than 700,000 people, including significant part of Czechoslovak intelligentsia left. Communists responded by revoking Czechoslovak citizenship of many of these refugees and banned them from returning to their homeland.

At a meeting of the United Nations Security Council, Yakov Malik, Soviet ambassador to the United Nations issued a proclamation, claiming that the military intervention was a response to a request by the government of Czechoslovakia. The Soviet Union being a permanent member of the Security Council—with the right to veto—was able to circumvent any United Nations' resolutions to end the occupation.

Prague Spring's end became clear by December 1968, when a new presidium of the Communist Party of Czechoslovakia accepted the so-called Instructions from The Critical Development in the Country and Society after the XIII Congress of the Communist Party of Czechoslovakia. Under a guise of "normalisation", all aspects of neo-Stalinism were returned to everyday political and economic life.

In 1987, the Soviet leader Mikhail Gorbachev acknowledged that his liberalizing policies of glasnost and perestroika owed a great deal to Dubček's socialism with a human face. When asked what the difference was between the Prague Spring and his own reforms, Gorbachev replied, "Nineteen years".

Soviet occupation of Czechoslovakia ended in 1989 by the Velvet Revolution, 2 years before the dissolution of the Soviet Union. The last occupation troops left the country on 27 June 1991.

During a visit to Prague in 2007, Vladimir Putin said that he felt the moral responsibility for the 1968 events and that Russia condemned them.

=== Afghanistan (1979–1989) ===
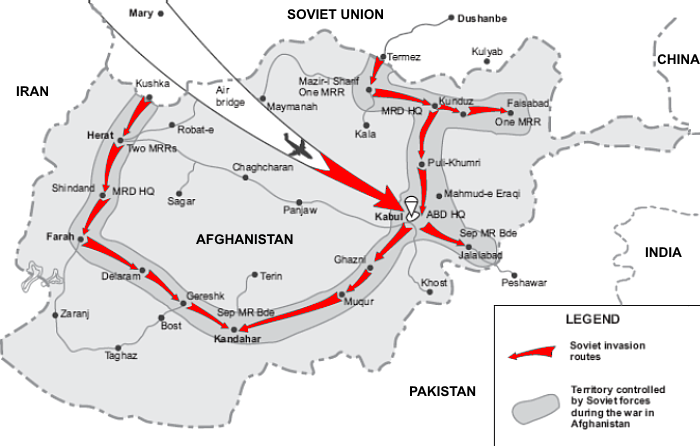
The Soviet invasion in December 1979.

Scholarly and historical accounts maintain that Afghanistan had been under the Soviet influence since as early as 1919, when Afghanistan began receiving aid to counter the Anglosphere of the British Empire. Major Soviet technical assistance, military aid, and economic relations grew in the 1950s followed by the Communist Revolution in the 1970s. With the threat to the Afghan communist government, the government invited the Soviet Union's invasion of Afghanistan which began as midnight approached on 24 December 1979. The USSR organized a massive military airlift into Kabul, involving an estimated 280 transport aircraft and 3 divisions of almost 8,500 men each. Within two days, the Soviet Union had seized control of Afghanistan, first securing Kabul by deploying a special Soviet assault unit against Darulaman Palace, where elements of the Afghan army loyal to Hafizullah Amin put up a fierce, but brief resistance. With Amin's death at the palace, Babrak Karmal, exiled leader of the Parcham faction of the PDPA was installed by the Soviets as Afghanistan's new head of government.

The peak of the fighting came in 1985–86. The Soviet forces launched their largest and most effective assaults on the mujahedin supply lines adjacent to Pakistan. Major campaigns had also forced the mujahedin into the defensive near Herat and Kandahar. On 15 February 1989, the last Soviet troops departed on schedule from Afghanistan.

== See also ==
- Military history of the Soviet Union, for other Soviet interventions
- Soviet Empire
- Western betrayal
- Captive Nations
- Russian-occupied territories
