= Museum of Communism, Warsaw =

Museum in Poland

Museum of Communism, Poland
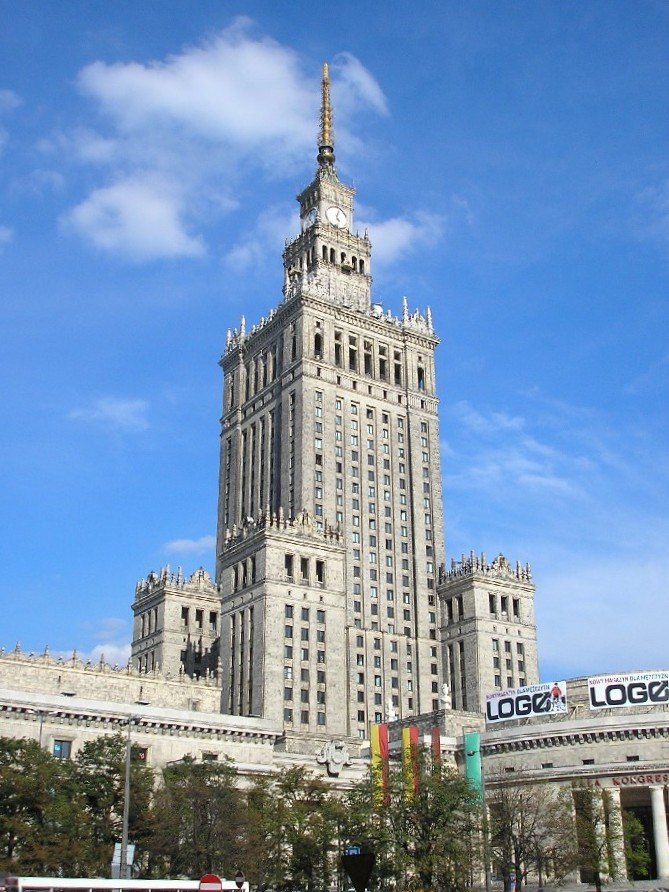
- Location: Poland
- Coordinates: 52°13′54″N 21°00′23″E
- Type: museum
- Location of Museum of Communism, Warsaw

The Museum of Communism was a planned museum focusing on the communist period of Polish history, located in the Palace of Culture and Science in Warsaw. The idea for the museum emerged in 1999 by Czeslaw Bielecki, Jacek Fedorowicz, and Andrzej Wajda, with the cooperation of Teresa Bogucka, Anna Fedorowicz, and Krystyna Zachwatowicz. Currently, its implementation is interrupted. In August 2011, it became known that its construction has been canceled because of lack of financial resources.

It should not be confused with the Museum of Life in the Polish People's Republic, located at ul. Piękna 28/34.

== Exhibits ==
The exhibits should include photographs, videos, and other pieces that illustrate violence and acts of resistance during the Communist era. Displays will detail the poor quality of goods, free healthcare, free education, advances in science, militarism, and constant control.

== See also ==
- Museum of Communism, Czech Republic
