= Lee Edwards =

American historian and author (1932–2024)

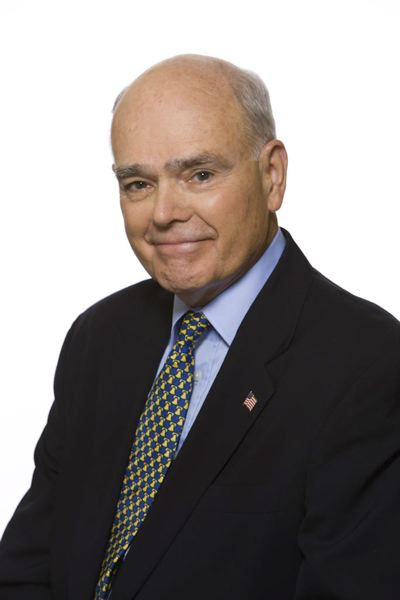
- Edwards in 2011
- Born: Lee Willard Edwards; December 1, 1932; Chicago, Illinois, U.S.
- Died: December 12, 2024 (aged 92); Arlington County, Virginia, U.S.
- Education: Duke University; Catholic University of America
- Occupations: Academic, historian, writer
- Known for: Founder of Young Americans for Freedom, Institute on Political Journalism and Victims of Communism Memorial Foundation
- Spouse: Anne Edwards (m. 1956; died 2022)
- Children: 2

Lee Willard Edwards (December 1, 1932 – December 12, 2024) was an American academic and author and a fellow at The Heritage Foundation. He was a historian of the conservative movement in the United States.

== Early life and education ==
Edwards was born in South Side, Chicago, on December 1, 1932. Edwards said he was influenced by the politics of his parents, both anti-communist. His father Willard was a journalist for the Robert R. McCormick-owned Chicago Tribune.

He earned a bachelor's degree in English from Duke University. Three decades later he received a doctorate in political science from the Catholic University of America. His 1986 dissertation was entitled Congress and the origins of the Cold War, 1946–1948.

== Career ==
Edwards helped found Young Americans for Freedom (YAF) in 1960, and then worked for the YAF magazine New Guard as editor. In 1963, he became news director of the Draft Goldwater Committee.

His publications include biographies of Ronald Reagan, William F. Buckley, Edwin Meese, and Barry Goldwater, and a work of history, The Conservative Revolution: The Movement That Remade America and The Power of Ideas. He acted as senior editor for the World & I, owned by a subsidiary of Sun Myung Moon's Unification Church.

Edwards was the founding director of the Institute on Political Journalism at Georgetown University and a fellow at the Harvard Institute of Politics. He was a past president of the Philadelphia Society and was a media fellow at the Hoover Institution.

He was a distinguished fellow in conservative thought in the B. Kenneth Simon Center for American Studies at The Heritage Foundation, and an adjunct professor of politics at the Catholic University of America and Institute of World Politics.

Edwards co-founded the Victims of Communism Memorial Foundation with The Heritage Foundation's founder and chairman, Edwin Feulner, and was appointed its chairman emeritus. Edwards was a signatory of the Prague Declaration on European Conscience and Communism.

== Personal life and death ==
Edwards and his wife, Anne, who assisted him in all his writing, lived in Alexandria, Virginia. They had two daughters and eleven grandchildren.

Edwards died at home in Arlington County, Virginia, on December 12, 2024, from pancreatic cancer at the age of 92.
