= Andrei Tsygankov =

Russian political scientist

Andrei Pavlovich Tsygankov
- Андрей Павлович Цыганков
- Born: April 23, 1964 (age 62)
- Occupation: international relations professor
- Known for: Russian international relations

Academic background
- Education: Moscow State University
- Alma mater: University of Southern California

Academic work
- Discipline: International Affairs

Andrei Pavlovich Tsygankov (Russian: Андрей Павлович Цыганков; born April 23, 1964) is a Russian-born academic and author in the field of international relations at San Francisco State University.

== Early life and education ==
Tsygankov received his Candidate of Sciences degree at Moscow State University in 1991 and after emigration a PhD from University of Southern California in 2000.

== Career ==
As of 2017, he has been a professor at San Francisco State University in California, where he teaches comparative Russian, and international politics in the Political Science and International Relations departments.

He has been a contributor at the Valdai Discussion Club.

== Selected publications ==
- Pathways after Empire (2001)
- New Directions in Russian International Studies (2004)
- Whose World Order? (2004)
- Russia’s Foreign Policy (2006)
- Russophobia: Anti-Russian Lobby and American Foreign Policy. New York: Palgrave Macmillan. April 26, 2009. doi:10.1057/9780230620957. ISBN 978-0-230-62095-7. Hardcover ISBN 978-0-230-61418-5. Softcover ISBN 978-1-349-37841-8.
- Russia and the West from Alexander to Putin (2012)
- The Strong State in Russia: Development and Crisis (2014)
- Russia's Foreign Policy: Change and Continuity in National Identity (2013) 5th edition (2019)
- Routledge Handbook of Russian Foreign Policy (2018) Chapter 3: doi/10.4324/9781315536934-4
