= Museum of Communism, Prague =

Museum in Czechia

Museum of Communism
- Muzeum Komunismu
- Established: 26 December 2001
- Location: V Celnici 1031/4, Prague 1, Czechia, 118 00
- Coordinates: 50.0878°N 14.4301°E
- Public transit access: Náměstí Republiky Metro
- Website: muzeumkomunismu.cz/en

The Museum of Communism (Czech: Muzeum komunismu), located at V Celnici 4 in Prague, Czechia, is a space dedicated to presenting an account of the post–World War II communist regime in Czechoslovakia, with a focus on Prague.

== History ==
The Museum of Communism was founded by Glenn Spicker, an American businessman and former student of politics, who spent $28,000 buying 1,000 artifacts and commissioning documentary filmmaker Jan Kaplan to design the museum. By his own account, Kaplan created a three-act tragedy displaying the ideals of communism, the reality of life under the regime, and the actions of the police state. It includes spaces depicting a schoolroom, a shop with limited supplies, and a secret police interrogation room.

The gallery is devoted to providing a timeline of the communist regime in Czechoslovakia. Written descriptions in Czech and English explain what it was like to live under the regime.

== Gallery ==
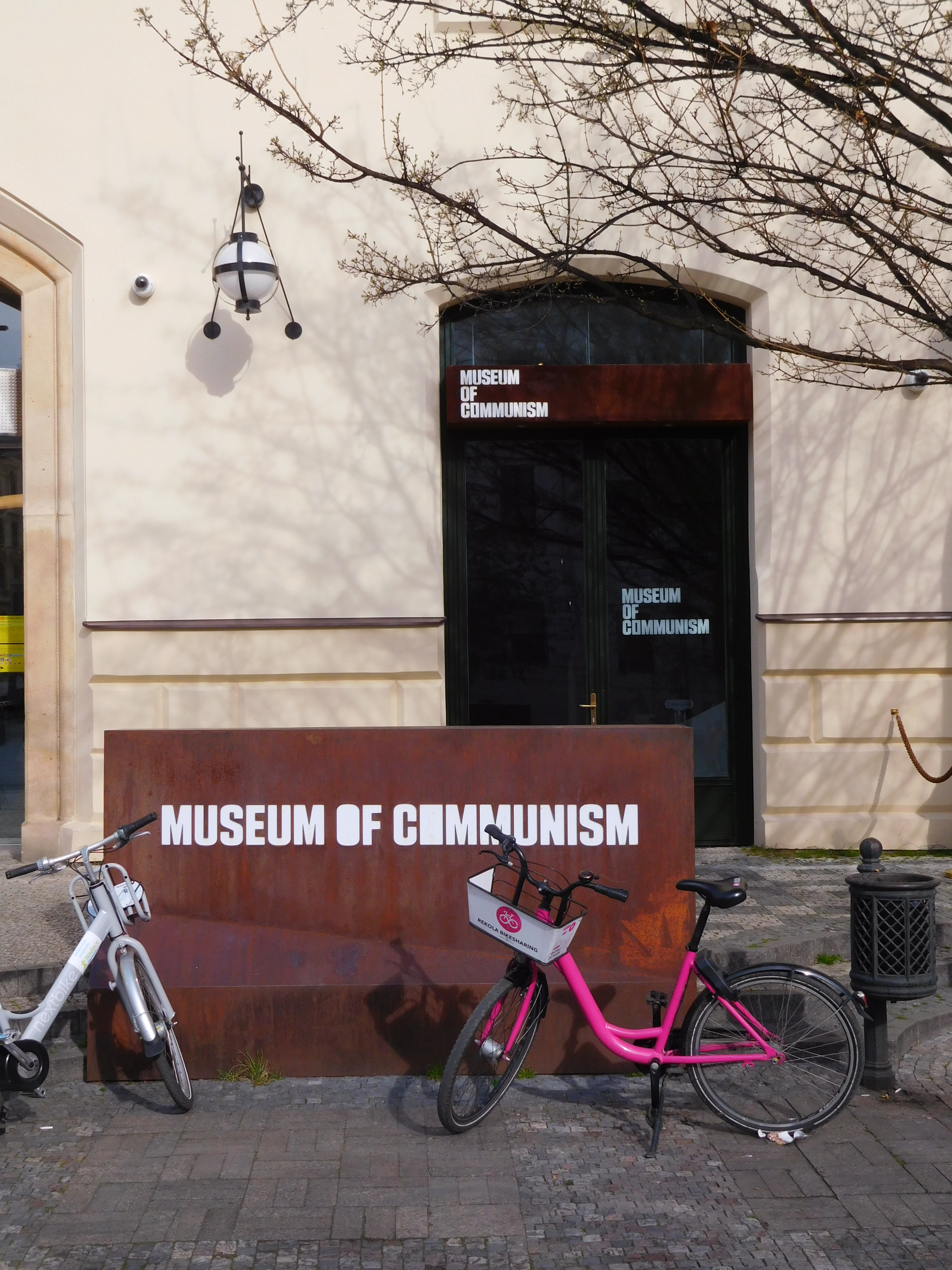
Entrance from Náměstí Republiky (2022)

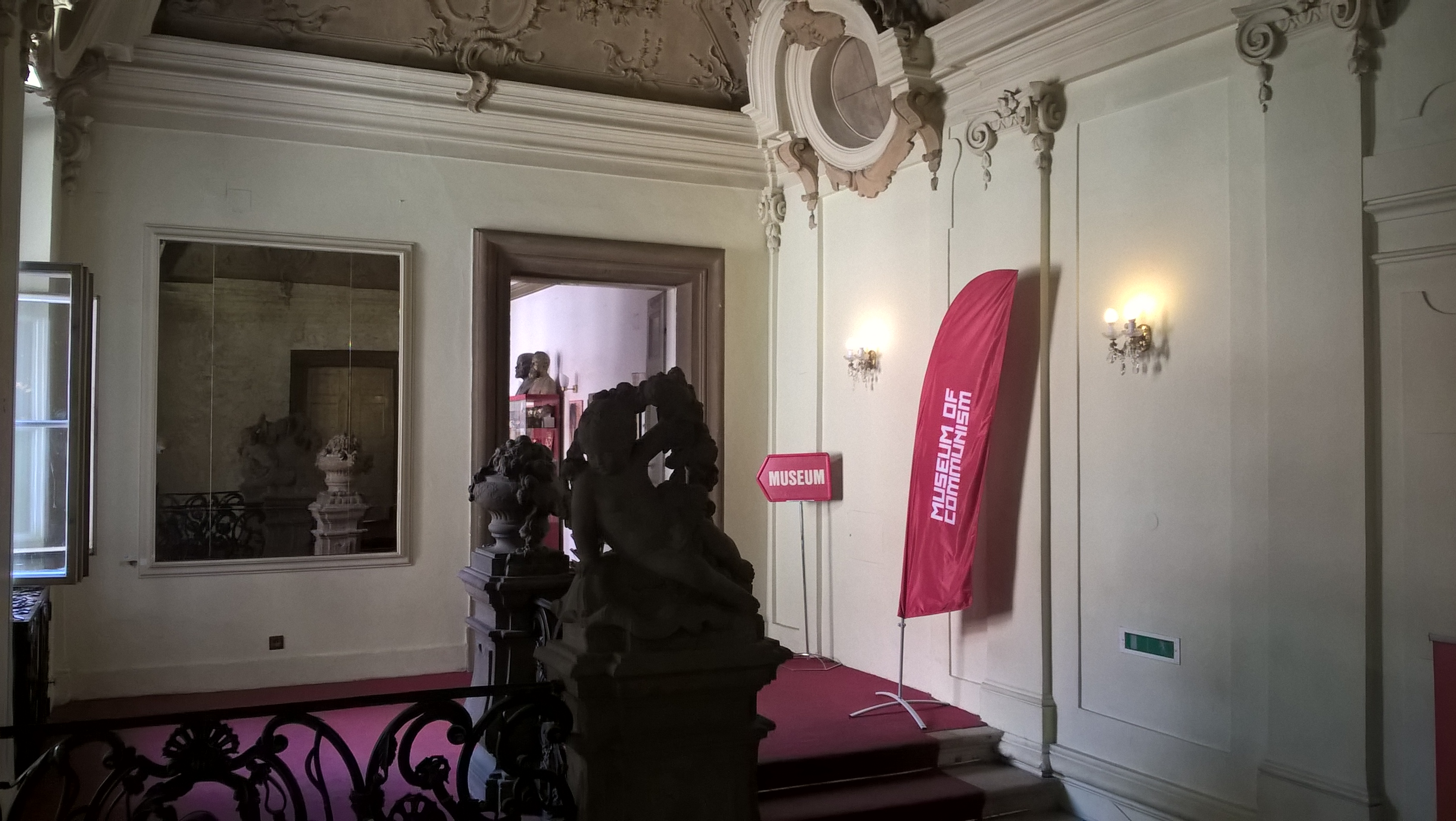
Entrance within the Savarin Palace (2016)

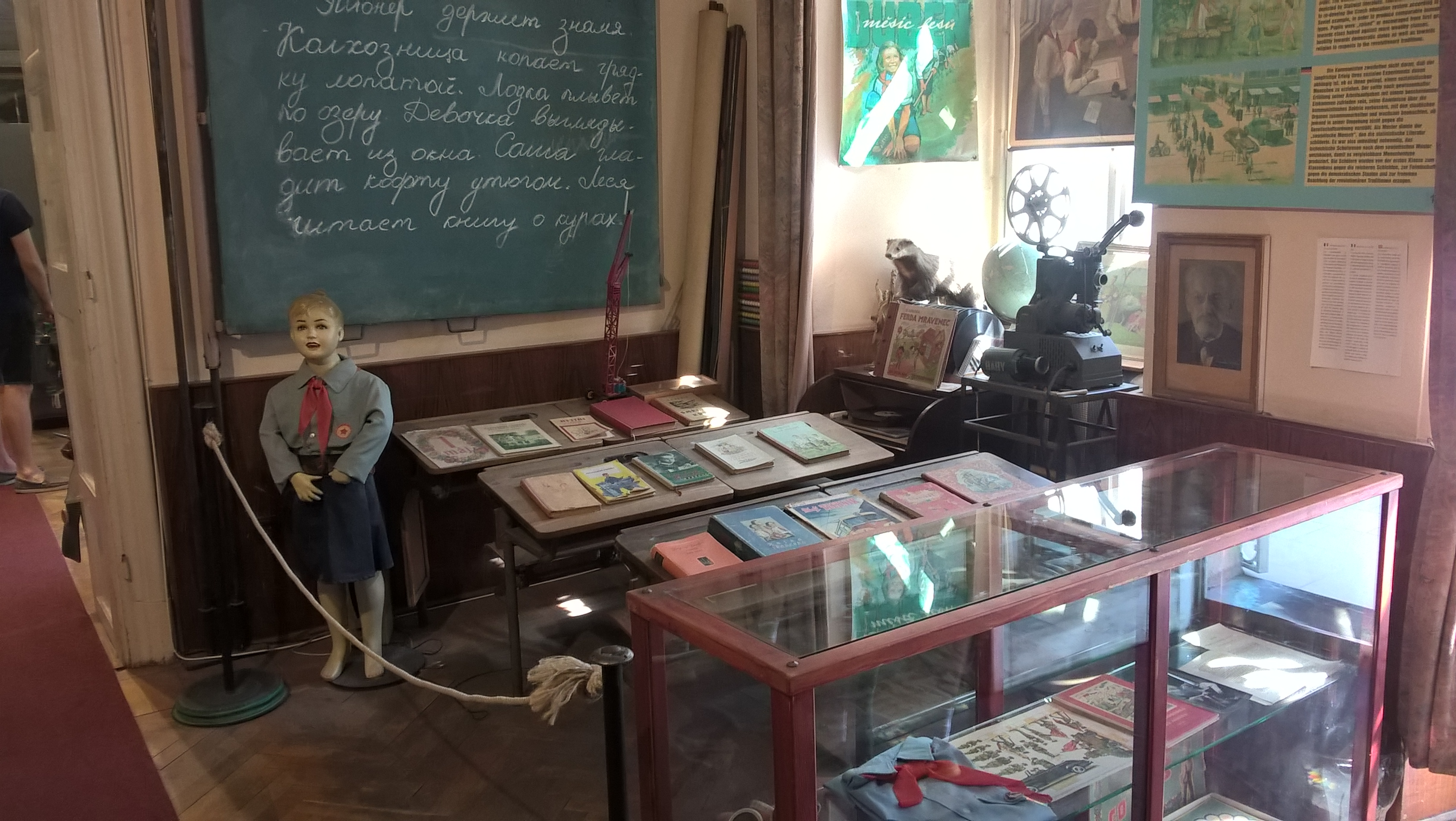
Schoolroom display, with child in pioneer outfit

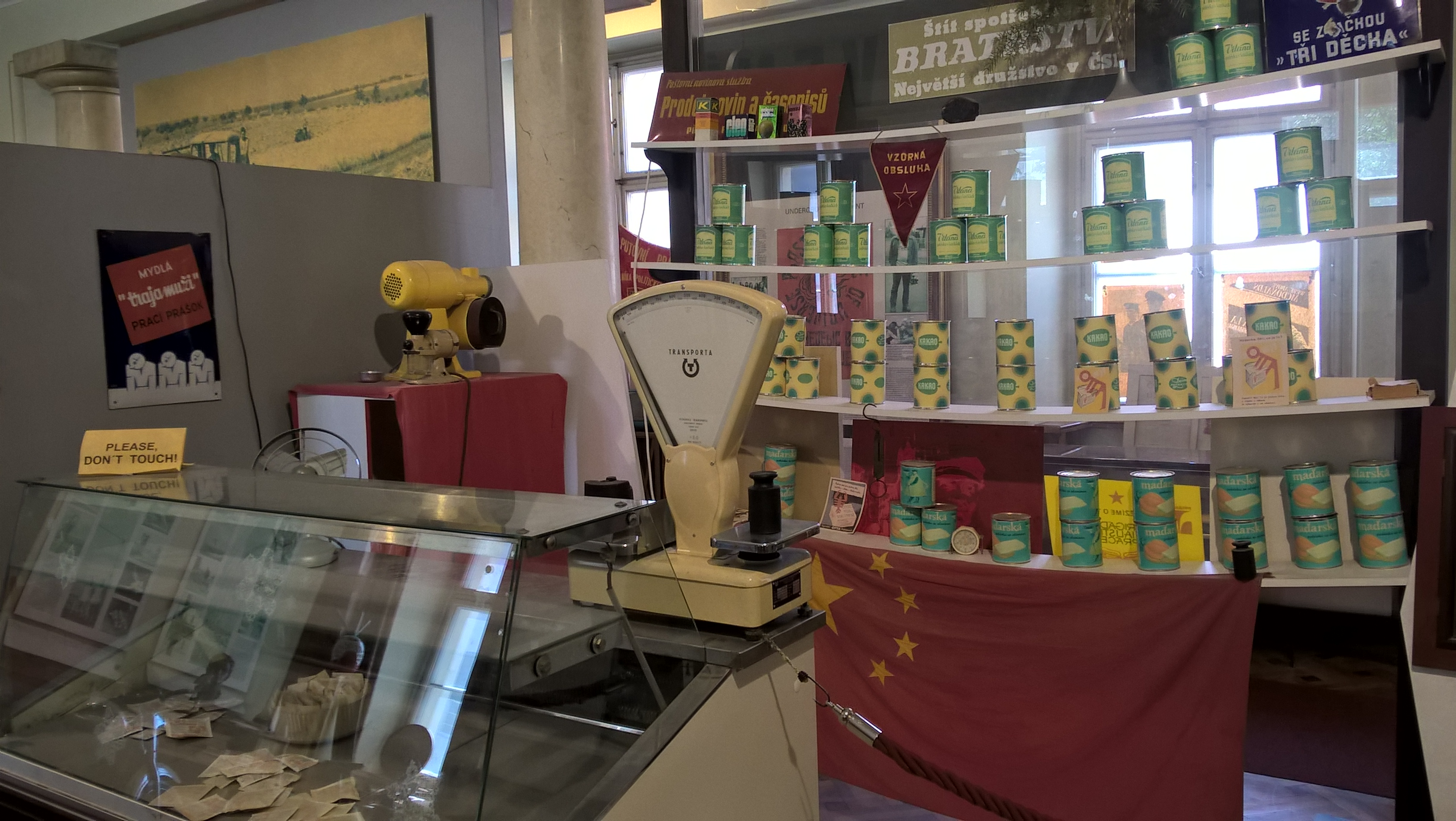
Grocery shop with limited goods

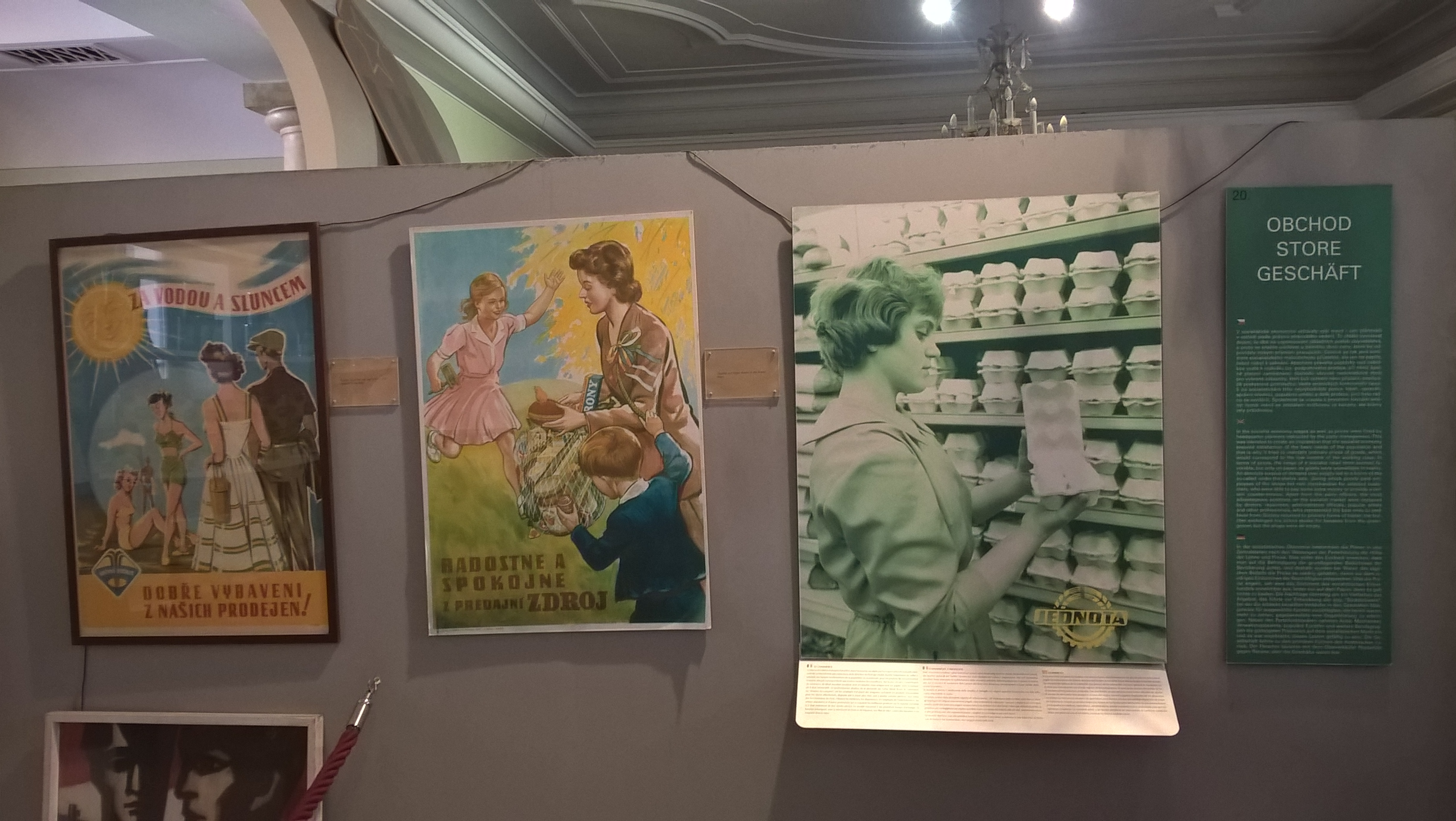
Posters showing "the good life"

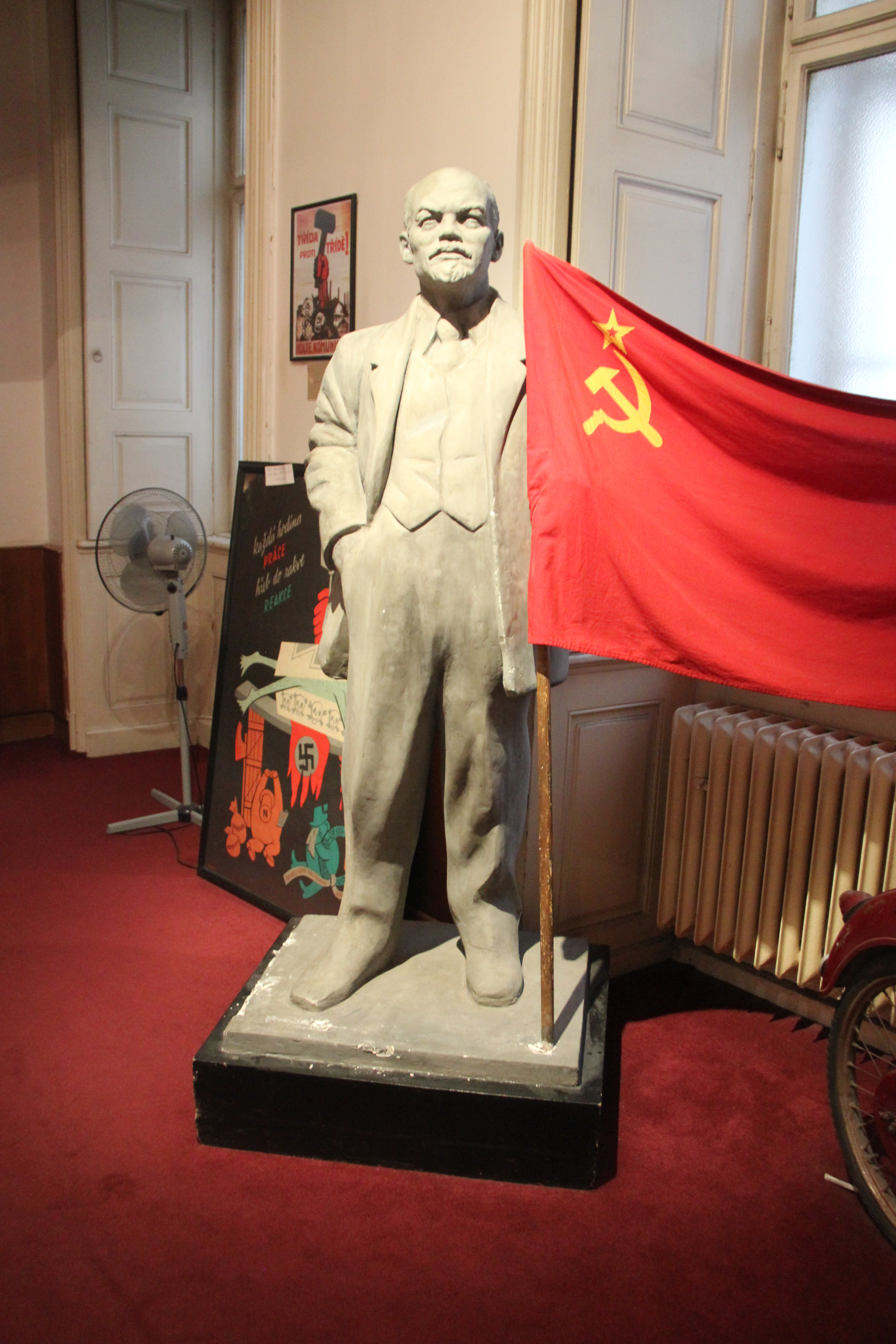
Lenin statue and the Soviet Union flag

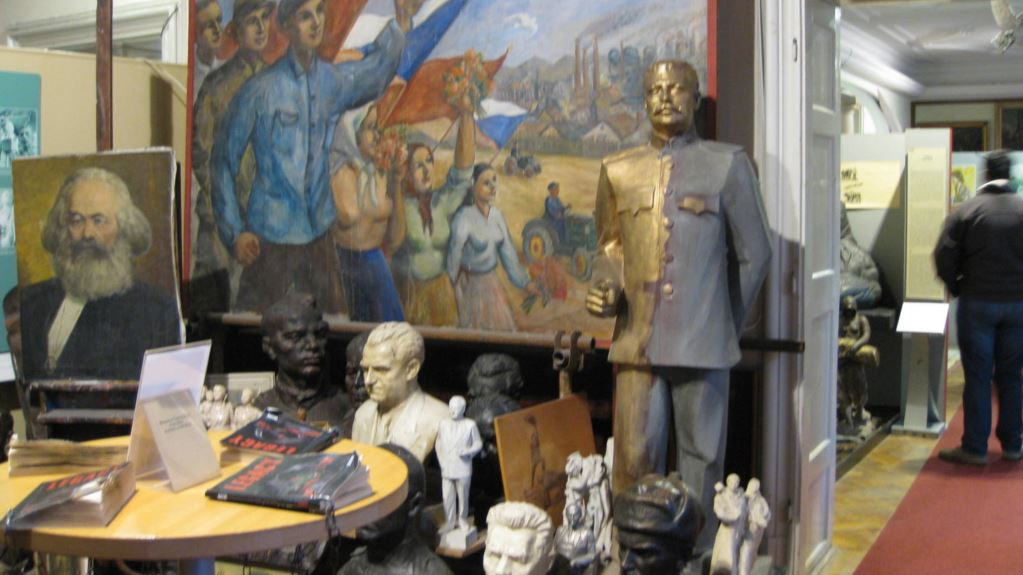
Various artifacts
