= 10th anniversary of the 1989 Tiananmen Square protests and massacre =

The 10th anniversary of the 1989 Tiananmen Square protests and massacre (10周年六四遊行) was a series of rallies – street marches, parades, and candlelight vigils – that took place in late May to early June 1999 to commemorate the 10th anniversary of 4 June 1989 Tiananmen Square protests and massacre. The anniversary of the event, during which the Chinese government sent troops to suppress pro-democracy movement and many people are thought to have perished, is remembered around the world in public open spaces and in front of many Chinese embassies in Western countries. On Chinese soil, any mention of the event is completely taboo in mainland China; events which mark it only take place in Hong Kong, and in Macao to a much lesser extent.

== Background ==
In the 1989 Tiananmen Square protests and massacre, thousands of students and protests had gathered in the centre of Beijing when troops opened fire. An unknown number of people were wounded or died in the incident.

As the People's Republic of China has publicly embraced the one country, two systems model of governance for Hong Kong, the annual 4 June observance which has become a tradition since 1989 has continued after the transfer of sovereignty from Britain to China. It is the only place on Chinese soil where the event is openly commemorated in any way and on any scale.

The 1989 protest is still considered a counter-revolutionary riot by the Chinese Communist Party, and remains taboo. Dissidents are routinely picked up by police, warned, sent away, or put under house arrest at this sensitive time every year. Across the world, this 10th anniversary was overshadowed by the US bombing of the Chinese Embassy in Belgrade which much angered Beijing, and gave a pretext for China to whip up nationalist sentiment. When asked what the government could do to compensate the families of those killed in the 1989 protests, Zhu Rongji said that he had "almost forgotten" the occasion. In Hong Kong, legislator Szeto Wah suggested Zhu was hypocritical for having "dismissed the question very diplomatically and avoided the question."

=== Denied entry to Hong Kong ===
Wang Dan, one of the most prominent student leaders in 1989, was refused an entry visa without reason for 4 June candlelight vigil in Victoria Park. Albert Ho condemned the Immigration Department's political decision, and accused the Government of acting "out of fear that it would affect its relations with the mainland."

== Mainland China ==
=== Public displays and arrests ===
Mainland authorities launched a nationwide crackdown on dissidents starting one month before the tenth anniversary. Beijing intellectual Yu Zhenbin, and Li Bagen, member of the China Democracy Party, were among those arrested in the run-up. According to Human Rights in China, Cao Jiahe, a magazine editor who circulated a petition in May to commemorate those killed in 1989, was allegedly held by police for four days, deprived of sleep for three days, and beaten up. Yang Tao, a contemporary of Wang Dan in the history department of Peking University, was arrested in early May by police in Guangzhou, and formally placed under arrest on 19 May in Guangzhou for attempting to organise a commemorative event. The Information Centre of Human Rights & Democratic Movement in China (ICHRDC) said that police had arrested at least 130 people nationwide. Of those, 42 were still in police custody as at 4 June. The Standard reported dissident Lin Mu, former secretary of the ousted party chief Hu Yaobang, saying that a candlelight vigil on the night of 3 June in Shanxi planned by 90 dissidents had been foiled by local police in advance by putting key people under house arrest or sending them to remote counties. Lin said Ma Xiaoming, one of the organisers, has been sent to a remote county in the province and his whereabouts were as yet unknown.

The Standard reported that Beijing authorities banned students from taking leave, in an attempt at keeping all students on campus; heads of department and faculty were also made responsible for ensuring their students stay off the streets. Although Tiananmen Square was closed off, ostensibly for renovations, two protesters demonstrated below Mao's portrait and were swiftly taken away. Police refused permission for a demonstration in Hangzhou; officers detained Wang Rongqing, Lai Jingbiao, Zhu Yufu and Yu Tielong – four members of the Democracy Party of China; three others were picked up in Beijing, according to the Information Centre of Human Rights and Democratic Movement in China.

=== Media ===
Beijing has ruled out a re-evaluation of the crackdown, saying the decision to use military force against unarmed students was "correct". Foreign Ministry spokesman Zhu Bangzao said: "The Communist Party and Government have made a correct and historical conclusion on the political turmoil which took place in the summer of 1989... That, more than anything else, will gain China the respect it desires." On 2 June, People's Daily published on its front page a rallying cry for stability, urging people to back the leadership to curb attempts by "hostile forces to infiltrate, subvert and split" China. It justified the leadership's actions as having "forcefully protected our nation's independence, dignity, security and stability, and guaranteed the continued healthy development of reform and opening up and economic construction."

The State Press and Publications Administration ordered the media to emphasise patriotism and nationalism by criticising the bombing of the Chinese Embassy in Belgrade; they were to avoid sensitive issues such as the crackdown and workers' unrest. An official said: 'Liberal publishing houses and vocal writers in the media are disciplined and continue to be put under supervision.'

Cable channels in Shenzhen habitually carry programming from Hong Kong television channels. However, in an apparent move to dilute the impact of the 10th anniversary of the massacre, the municipal authorities blacked out all news reports and feature stories on the crackdown aired by Hong Kong television broadcast since the end of the previous month. Viewers were apparently left bewildered by the authorities' replacement of undesirable programming with old news footage.

== United States ==
One week before the anniversary, Nancy Pelosi sponsored a resolution in the House of Representatives condemning Beijing's rights record, urging an official re-evaluation of 4 June by Beijing, calling for the release of political prisoners, the punishment of those responsible for the killings, compensation for victims' families and the lifting of the blacklist on overseas dissidents the previous week. The motion was passed. China reacted angrily to the supposed "interference in China's internal affairs"

"Now, the US Congress brazenly and peremptorily interfered in China's internal affairs in its anti-China resolution, flagrantly demanding that Beijing set up a certain 'investigation committee' and 're-evaluate' the incident. The attempt to reverse the official conclusion - that the protests were a 'counter-revolutionary rebellion' - is extremely domineering

— Xinhua News Agency

Chinese dissidents on both the east and west coast organised candlelight vigils, memorial ceremonies, panel discussions and other events to commemorate the 10th anniversary; members of Congress and human rights groups planned their own commemorations. A candlelight vigil, organised by the Independent Federation of Chinese Students and Scholars, was planned in front of the Chinese embassy in Washington on Friday evening featuring speeches by noted dissidents, rights activists and, other politicians. A memorial ceremony was held in Portsmouth Square in San Francisco, where Nancy Pelosi spoke. A 2.85-metre bronze replica of the 'Goddess of Democracy' weighing 270 kg, was unveiled at Freedom Park in Arlington by the Freedom Forum. In New York, Human Rights in China organised an overnight memorial on 3/4 June in New York during which testimonials were read honouring those killed in the crackdown.

== Macao ==
A candlelight vigil organised by the New Democratic Macau Association was held on a plaza adjacent to Macau's main square, the Largo do Senado, attracted a crowd of about 400 people, while a pro-Beijing association held a children's dance show nearby at the same time.

The US-based China Spring Magazine moved a seminar on "one country, two systems" to Macau, after some of its participants failed to obtain Hong Kong visas. The seminar finally took place at a workers' welfare centre run by a Protestant sect, after two venues banned the roughly 30 participants from their premises, both saying they had not been informed of the event's sensitive nature. Keynote speaker, dissident Wang Bingzhang, asserted the two businesses had reacted to political pressure.

== Hong Kong ==
=== LegCo motion ===
Szeto Wah tabled a motion in LegCo to mourn for those compatriots who died and to call for the vindication of the pro-democracy movement, was defeated with 20 in favour, 13 abstentions and 22 votes against, (four legislators were absent). Legislators from the loyalist Democratic Alliance for the Betterment of Hong Kong (DAB) and the Hong Kong Progressive Alliance voted against the motion, while the Liberal Party abstained. DAB legislator Yeung Yiu-Chung justified his party's vote saying: "According to a Spanish television report, all the student protesters at Tiananmen Square withdrew peacefully from the scene, and nobody was killed or injured."

=== March ===
A march organised for 30 May by Hong Kong Alliance in Support of Patriotic Democratic Movements in China was attended by more than 4,000 people, according to the organisers, the biggest rally since 1992. Police estimated the crowd to be 2,000. Marchers, led by the Alliance's Chairman, legislator Szeto Wah and democracy camp legislators Martin Lee, Cheung Man-kwong, Lau Chin-shek and Lee Cheuk-yan handed a letter which demanded democracy in China to a government representative when they arrived outside the office of Chief Executive Tung Chee Wah.

=== Candlelight vigil ===
Organisers said that more than 70,000 attended the vigil in Victoria Park, although the police declined to give an official attendance figure.

The vigil recalled the history of the events in both Beijing and Hong Kong on a fateful night with songs and other performances, followed by a screened episodes of the student demonstration in Tiananmen Square, and the crackdown. The alliance core members also sent wreaths to a statue memorialising the martyrs and pledged to fight for a democratic China. After a one-minute silence to mourn the dead, Wang Dan addressed the crowd from Boston, and his mother Wang Lingyun from Beijing.

== See also ==
- 20th anniversary of the 1989 Tiananmen Square protests and massacre
- 21st anniversary of the 1989 Tiananmen Square protests and massacre
- Hong Kong 1 July marches
- Memorials for the 1989 Tiananmen Square protests and massacre
