= Memorials for the 1989 Tiananmen Square protests and massacre =

Commemorations honoring the victims of the 1989 Tiananmen Square massacre

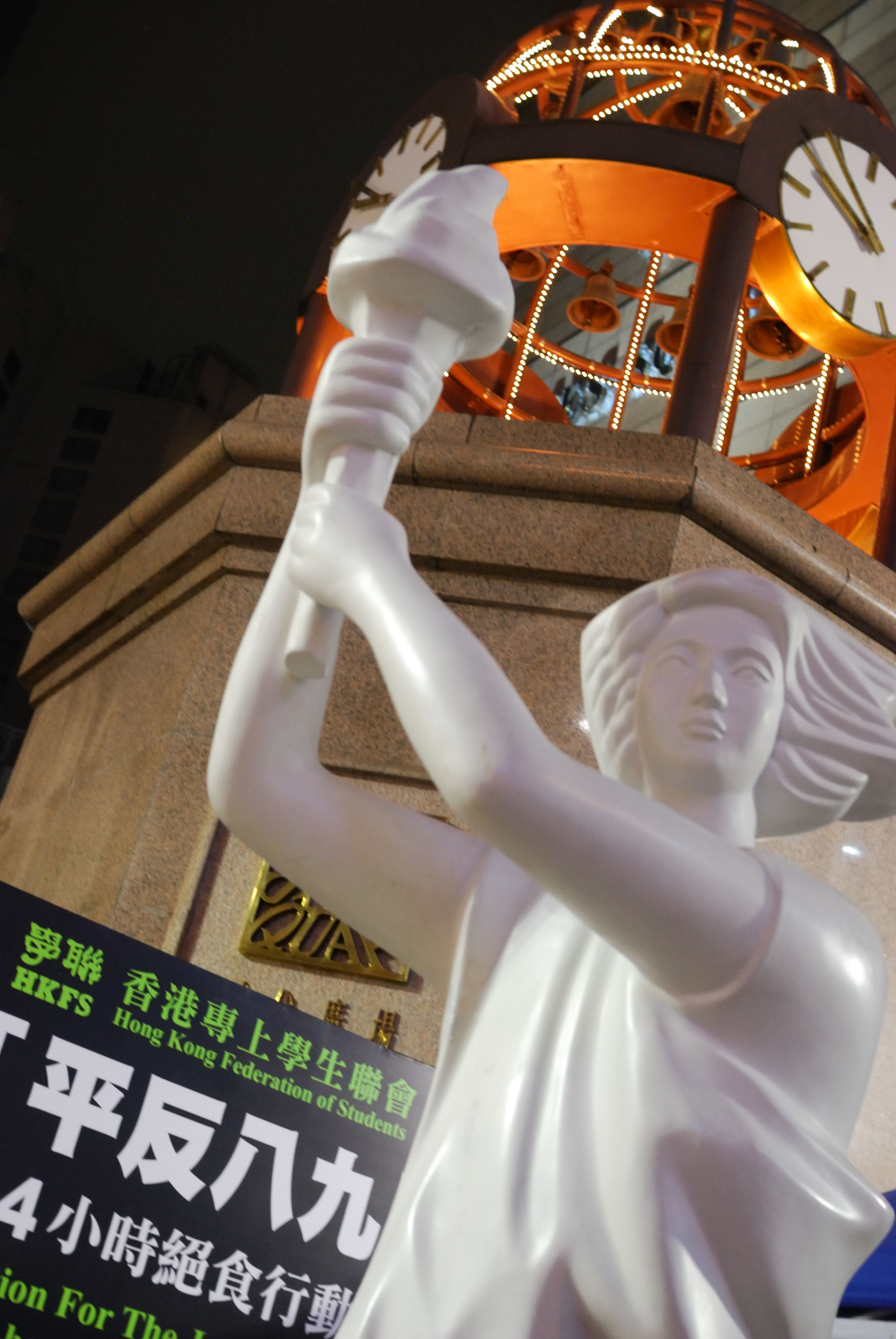
A white plastic statue in the backdrop of Times Square from the 20th anniversary commemorations

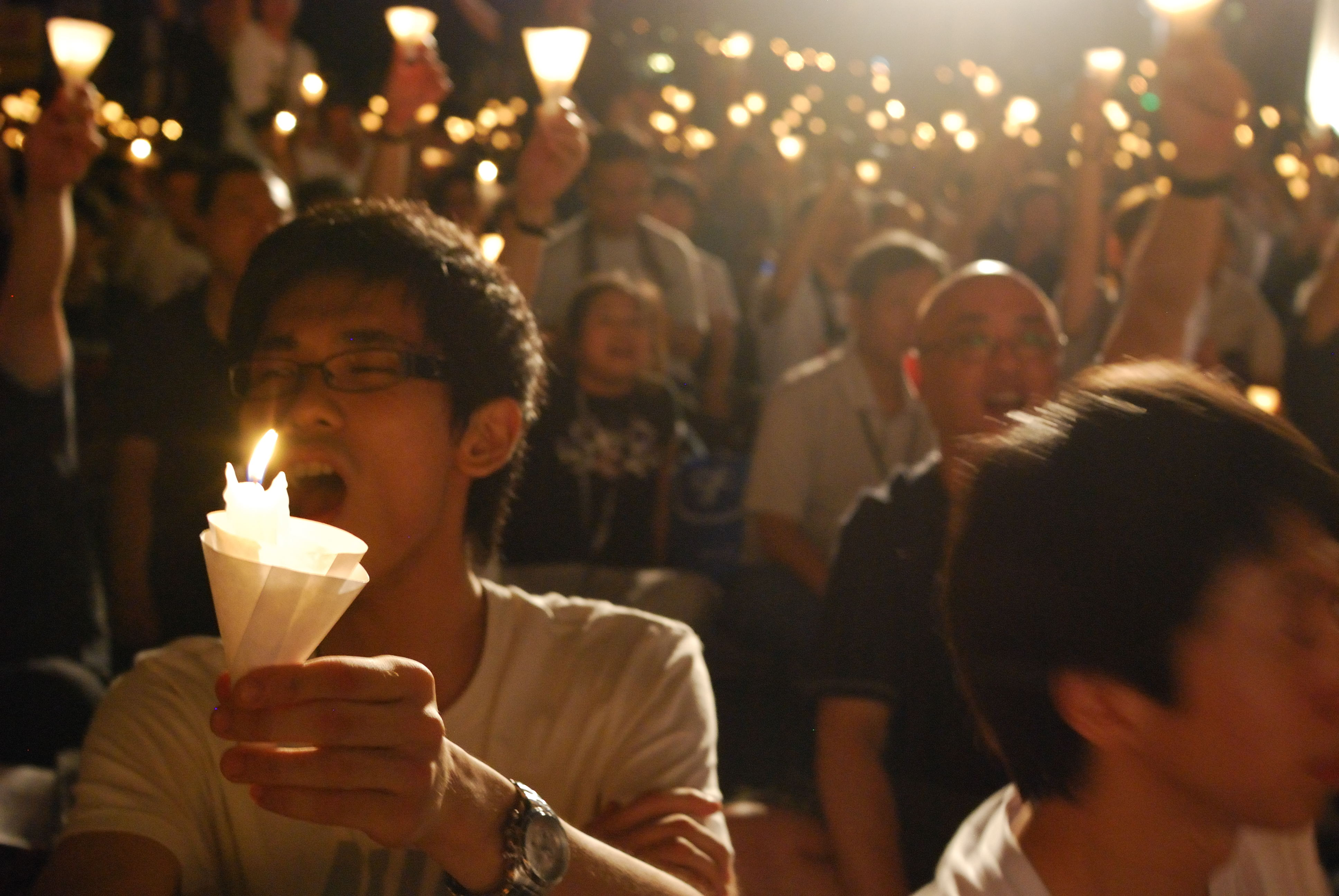
20th anniversary of the 4 June massacre

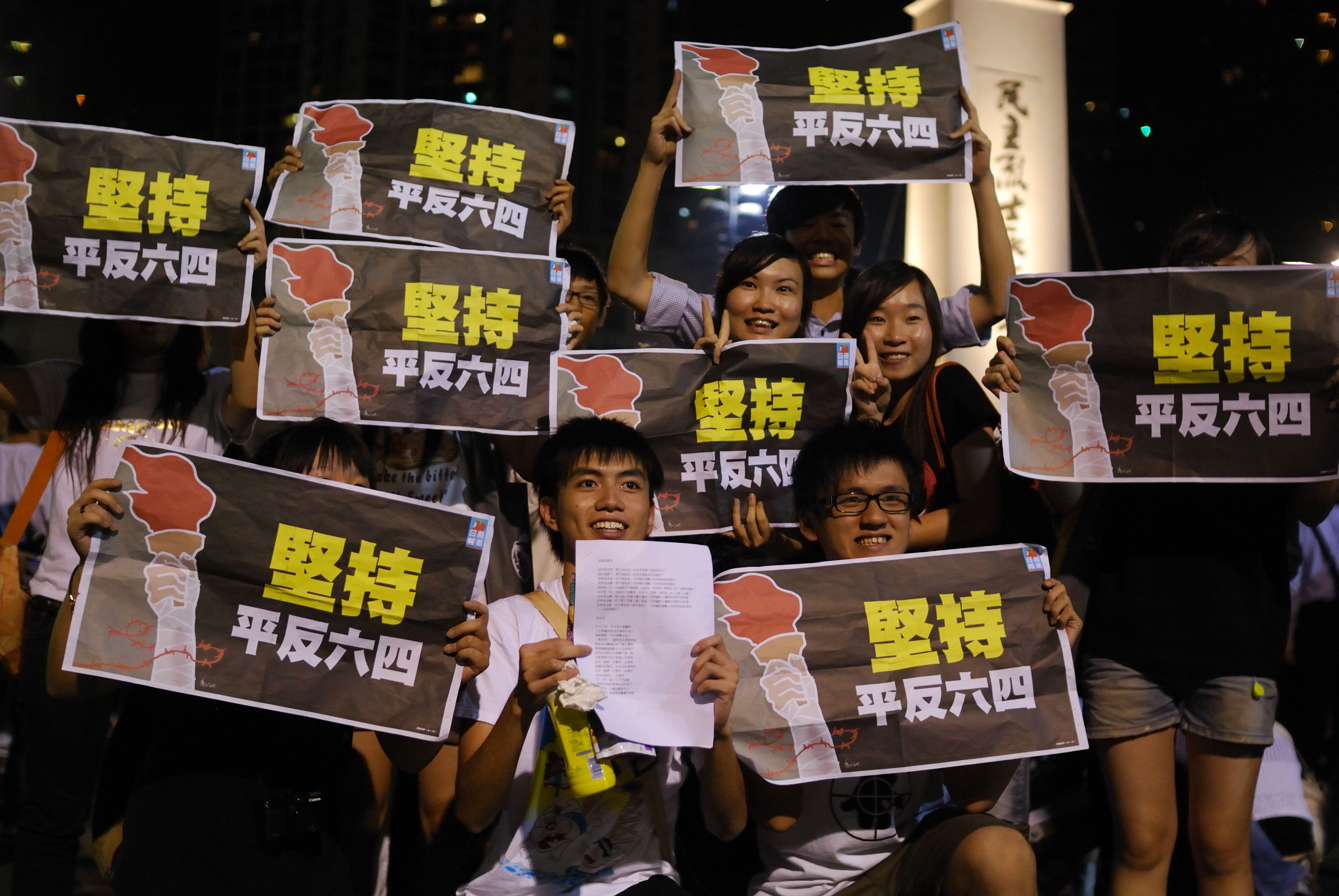
20th anniversary of the 4 June massacre

In the days following the end of the 1989 Tiananmen Square protests and massacre, several memorials and vigils were held around the world for those who were killed in the demonstrations. Since then, annual memorials have been held in places outside of mainland China, most notably in Hong Kong, Taiwan and the United States.

The 31st anniversary commemoration took place only a few short months after the anti-government protests had subsided. Although the Hong Kong vigil was banned due to the COVID-19 pandemic, many chose to ignore the ban. In the following months, 24 leading pro-democratic activists were arrested for unlawful assembly. Although there had not been any cases of local transmission of COVID-19, and although Art Basel was allowed to take place, the 32nd anniversary commemoration in Victoria Park was similarly banned due to pandemic restrictions. However, as the government seems increasingly willing to use tough measures against any form of civil protest, a massive police presence was preemptively mobilised in 2021.

== Hong Kong ==
Vindicate 4 June and Relay the Torch is an annual activity mourning the 1989 Tiananmen Square protests and massacre organized by Hong Kong Alliance in Support of Patriotic Democratic Movements of China in Hong Kong Victoria Park.

Anniversary (ordinal)	Year	Data by Alliance	Data by police
1st	1990	150,000	80,000
2nd	1991	100,000	60,000
3rd	1992	80,000	28,000
4th	1993	40,000	12,000
5th	1994	40,000	12,000
6th	1995	35,000	16,000
7th	1996	45,000	16,000
8th	1997	55,000	N/A
9th	1998	40,000	16,000
10th	1999	70,000	N/A
11th	2000	45,000	N/A
12th	2001	48,000	N/A
13th	2002	45,000	N/A
14th	2003	50,000	N/A
15th	2004	82,000	48,000
16th	2005	45,000	22,000
17th	2006	44,000	19,000
18th	2007	55,000	27,000
19th	2008	48,000	18,000
20th	2009	200,000	62,800
21st	2010	150,000	113,000
22nd	2011	150,000+	77,000
23rd	2012	180,000	85,000
24th	2013	150,000	54,000
25th	2014	180,000+	99,500
26th	2015	135,000	46,600
27th	2016	125,000	21,800
28th	2017	110,000	18,000
29th	2018	115,000	17,000
30th	2019	180,000+	37,000
31st (banned)	2020	N/A	N/A
32nd (banned)	2021	N/A	N/A
33rd (banned)	2022	N/A	N/A
34th (banned)	2023	N/A	N/A
35th (banned)	2024	N/A	N/A

=== Memorials before the handover ===
In 1990, on the first anniversary of the massacre, Reuters quoted an estimate of 15,000 people who took part in the demonstration. Organizers from the Hong Kong Alliance in Support of Democracy in China (also known as Hong Kong Alliance in Support of Patriotic Democratic Movements of China) provided an estimate of 30,000. Attendees chanted "Long live democracy" and "Rescue those who live".

Tensions were high in 1996, which marked the seventh anniversary of the Tiananmen massacre. Residents were not sure whether or not the annual demonstration would continue after the upcoming 1997 sovereignty handover of Hong Kong to the People's Republic of China. Many Hong Kong natives feared they would lose the legal right to demonstrate after the handover, which made it so that the annual demonstration's fate was in potential jeopardy. One demonstrator, Yeung Sum, voiced his support for continued demonstrations as he shouted out "this kind of demonstration must be publicly held after 1997". According to the Globe and Mail, more than 20,000 attended. In the park there was a cenotaph, which was a replica of Heroes' Monument (also known as the Monument to the People's Heroes) in Tiananmen Square, and near this monument stood a reproduction of the highly symbolic Goddess of Democracy. People in the park sang "Do you hear the people sing? / Singing the song of angry men? / It is the music of a people". Attendees "carried large funeral wreaths" to the base of the replicated Heroes' Monument. When the floodlights dimmed, people passed several minutes of silence by raising thousands of candles.

The eighth anniversary, in 1997, was just before the handover (also known as the Transfer of sovereignty over Hong Kong). People in the demonstration speculated that it might turn out to be the last vigil. Organizers estimated a total of 55,000 people, which was a record breaking number up to this point. According to the Associated Press the "demonstrators cut across many divisions" and included groups of people such as youth, business professionals, senior citizens, and workers. City Hall approved the demonstration, as well as a "controversial three-story high sculpture". This piece was called "The Pillar of Shame" and was lit up during the night. It portrayed "twisted bodies with agonized faces". "The Pillar of Shame" was "controversial" partially because City Hall refused to allow the sculpture to be shown in public during the Hong Kong handover ceremony.

=== Memorials after the handover ===
The ninth anniversary, in 1998, was significant because – according to The Guardian – they were the "first protestors permitted to mourn the trauma of Tiananmen on Chinese soil". This memorial service was also centred on the "controversial Pillar of Shame". Demonstrators hung "large black banners" that read "reverse the verdict on June 4", while other banners swore to "fight to the end" and to "never forget June 4". Wei Jingsheng "sent a pre-recorded video message" that was broadcast through loud speakers and Wang Dan "spoke live from New York".

The tenth anniversary, in 1999, also featured the controversial "Pillar of Shame" and according to the South China Morning Post, the sculpture included a column that read "the spirit of democracy martyrs will live forever". Similar to demonstrations in earlier years, the participants also sang "pro-democracy" songs and "chanted slogans". The South China Morning Post reported that Wang Dan's mother, Wang Lingyun, "spoke to the crowd from a mobile phone after her line at home was cut off at 5 pm". From San Francisco, Wang Dan also spoke to the crowd. During the fifteenth anniversary, in 2004, activists handed out leaflets, which encouraged mainland tourists to go to the vigil. Organizers reported that 82,000 people attended, which was up from last year's count of 50,000.

The twentieth anniversary, in 2009, had about 150,000 attendees, according to organizers. This was the largest turnout since the first vigil nineteen years earlier, according to organizers. Police, however, recorded the number of attendees to only be about 62,800. As the attendees were holding candles and playing traditional Chinese instruments, demonstrators chanted "Vindicate the student movement of 1989!". China's Ministry of Public Security issued a "written statement" about "security measures" taken prior to the beginning of the anniversary. Since the rise of localism in Hong Kong and the 2014 Umbrella Movement in particular, turnout for Tiananmen vigils in Hong Kong has been steadily declining. Some student groups explicitly boycotting them, asserting that the Hong Kong Autonomy Movement and the Chinese democracy movement are, or should be, separate concerns.

=== 2020 and beyond ===
The 31st anniversary commemoration took place only a few short months after the anti-government protests had subsided. Although the commemorations had been banned in Hong Kong due to the COVID-19 pandemic, many people still chose to ignore the ban and attended the public vigil in Victoria Park. In the months that followed, the political climate grew even more hostile under Carrie Lam following the passage of the national security legislation by the NPC, and 24 activists were arrested as organisers of the vigil.

On 28 April 2021, a government spokesperson announced that the 32nd anniversary commemoration in Victoria Park would again be banned due to pandemic restrictions despite there having been no locally transmitted cases over the previous six weeks. The government showed its determination to stop any memorial from taking place when the Security Bureau warned on 29 May that the penalty for attending an unlawful assembly was five years in prison under the Public Order Ordinance, or one year for promoting it.

Although the Alliance decided to abide by the government ban, urging the public to commemorate in a lawful and safe manner, the government preemptively mobilised 7,000 police officers – one fifth of its strength – for deployment across Hong Kong on 4 June. Victoria Park alone would be guarded by 3,000 officers, and most of the park was declared off-llimits. Victoria Park lay empty for the first time in 32 years.

== Mainland China ==
Police are kept on alert during many of the anniversaries in order to guard against public displays of mourning. According to The Washington Post, Beijing "banned any mourning by groups not specifically authorized". Similarly, during the third anniversary there was a sign in the centre of the Square that "warned visitors not to lay mourning wreaths", unless the government had given the visitor consent at least five days in advance.

Several people have been arrested, or at least taken away for questioning, for attempting to mourn the victims publicly. One man was questioned for wearing a button that had the V-for-Victory sign and the word "Victory" on it in 1990. According to the New York Times, another man, in 1992, named Wang Wanxin "was dragged away after he tried to unfurl a banner calling on Deng Xiaoping [...] to apologize for the 1989 army crackdown". Some other modes of commemoration included 50 dissidents staging a 24-hour hunger strike in 2000 and private memorial services in people's houses. In 1999, Su Bingxian lit a candle for her son who was killed in the massacre, while others lit ten symbolic candles.

== Taiwan ==
On 4 June 2016, Taiwan, formally known as the Republic of China (ROC) held the nation's first ever commemoration in parliament of the 1989 Tiananmen Square crackdown as lawmakers urged the new government to address human rights issues in its dealing with mainland China. It comes weeks after China-sceptic Tsai Ing-wen was sworn in as president, succeeding Ma Ying-jeou who oversaw an unprecedented eight-year rapprochement with Beijing.

In the past, the ROC government has repeatedly urged the PRC to learn lessons from the Tiananmen crackdown on pro-democracy protesters, in which more than 1,000 were killed according to some estimates. A day ahead of the 4 June anniversary, senior lawmakers from the Democratic Progressive Party (DPP) and the pro-Cross-Strait relations Kuomintang (KMT) were joined by human rights activists and exiled Chinese dissident Wu'er Kaixi as they observed a minute's silence. They also signed a motion proposed by DPP lawmaker Yu Mei-nu to demand the government "express Taiwan's serious concerns over redressing the June 4 incident at the appropriate time" in future interactions between the two sides.

== United States ==
In the United States, the first memorial was organized on the 100th day of 4 June 1989 by the Independent Federation of Chinese Students and Scholars, and the second memorial service was organized also by the Independent Federation of Chinese Students and Scholars in the Capitol Hill. Since then, Independent Federation of Chinese Students and Scholars has organized annual memorial services in front of the Chinese Embassy in Washington DC.

In San Francisco, for the fifth anniversary, the city erected a 9.5 foot (3 m) bronze statue that was modeled after the original Goddess of Democracy. It is located in the edges of Chinatown, on a small park. Fang Lizhi and Nick Er Liang were at the unveiling. The designer, Thomas Marsh, used photographs of the original Goddess of Democracy as a model for his statue. Two Chinese students of his formed the torch, and another formed the face.

== Poland ==
A Tiananmen memorial was built during Solidarity pro democracy demonstrations in 1989 in the Polish city of Wrocław, Lower Silesia. The memorial was destroyed by the Polish authorities, but has been rebuilt since the end of single party communism in Poland.

== Online memorials ==
There are many online memorials. For example, the organizers of the annual candlelight vigil, the Hong Kong Alliance in Support of Patriotic Democratic Movements of China, have a website where people can sign the "Condolence Book for the victims of Tiananmen". The book is then "burnt in front of the statue of democracy at the June 4 Candlelight vigil". In mid-2020 the U.S.-based Visual Artists Guild announced it was streaming its annual commemoration online on 31 May due to the COVID-19 pandemic.
