= Goddess of Democracy =

Statue created during the Tiananmen Square protests

- Goddess of Democracy
- Chinese: 民主女神
Transcriptions
Standard Mandarin
- Hanyu Pinyin: mínzhǔ nǚshén
- Wade–Giles: Minchu Nüshen
- IPA: [mǐnʈʂỳ nỳʂə̌n]

Spirit of Democracy
- Chinese: 民主精神
Transcriptions
Standard Mandarin
- Hanyu Pinyin: mínzhǔ jīngshén
- Wade–Giles: Minchu Chingshen

The Goddess of Democracy, also known as the Goddess of Democracy and Freedom, the Spirit of Democracy (民主之神; mínzhǔ zhī shén), and the Goddess of Liberty (自由女神; zìyóu nǚshén), was a 10-metre-tall (33 ft) statue created during the 1989 Tiananmen Square protests. The statue was constructed over four days out of foam and papier-mâché over a metal armature and was unveiled and erected on Tiananmen Square on May 30, 1989. The constructors decided to make the statue as large as possible to try to dissuade the government from dismantling it: the government would either have to destroy the statue—an action which would potentially fuel further criticism of its policies—or leave it standing. Nevertheless, the statue was destroyed on June 4, 1989, by soldiers clearing the protesters from Tiananmen Square. Since its destruction, numerous replicas and memorials have been erected around the world, including in Hong Kong, San Francisco, Washington, D.C., and Vancouver.

== Construction ==
Near the end of May 1989 the Democracy Movement in Tiananmen Square, though still attracting huge throngs of participants, was losing momentum in the face of government inaction on reforms. One historian said the movement "appeared to have sunk to its nadir. The number of students in the Square continued to decline. Those remaining seemed to have no clear leadership: Chai Ling, tired and disheartened by the difficulties of keeping the Movement together, had resigned from her post...[the Square] had degenerated into a shantytown, strewn with litter and permeated by the stench of garbage and overflowing portable toilets... Tianamen, once a magnet pulling in huge throngs, had become only an unkempt campground of little interest to citizens, many of whom considered the struggle for democracy lost." It was at this point that the revealing of the statue of the Goddess of Democracy reinvigorated the movement in the Square.

The statue was built by students of the Central Academy of Fine Arts beginning on May 27 at their University. It was built in hopes of bolstering the movement which "seemed to be losing some of its momentum; the students suspected that the government was waiting for them to tire and leave the Square". Working with a sense of urgency and expedience to create the model the larger statue would be based on, the students reworked an academic exercise built to demonstrate the effect of the distribution of weight on a piece: "a half-meter [20"] high clay sculpture of a man grasping a pole with two raised hands and leaning his weight on it." "The students cut off the lower part of the pole and added a flame at the top to turn it into a torch; they leaned the sculpture into a more upright position; they changed the man's face to a woman's, and otherwise added feminine characteristics to make the him into a her." They then transferred the measurements of the model, adjusting them for the larger proportion, to the foam that once carved became the monument. Jeff Widener, known for his iconic Tank Man photograph, took other photographs of the fateful rally, including two widely publicized images of the Goddess; one under construction, and another in context of the demonstration.

While many people have noted its resemblance to the Statue of Liberty, a sculptor present during its construction, Tsao Tsing-yuan, has written that the students decided not to model their statue on the Statue of Liberty because they were concerned that it would be unoriginal and "too openly pro-American." Tsao further notes the influence on the statue of the work of Russian sculptor Vera Mukhina, associated with the school of revolutionary realism. Her piece Worker and Kolkhoz Woman was especially influential for their statue's head and facial features.

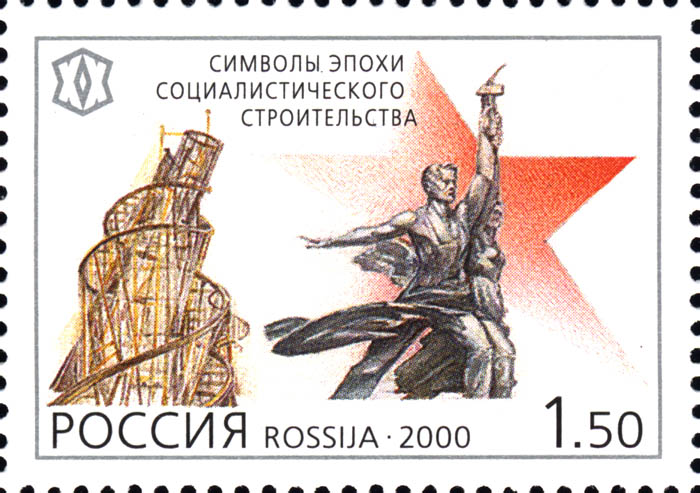
Vera Mukhina's Worker and Kolkhoz Woman sculpture (seen on a Russian stamp here on the right) influenced the creators of the Goddess of Democracy

When the time came to transport the pieces of the statue to the Square, the State Security Bureau, hearing of the students' intention, declared that any truck drivers assisting them would lose their licenses. The students hired six Beijing carts (similar to a bicycle rickshaw except with a flat cart instead of a passenger area). Four carried the statue segments, and two carried the tools required to install it. The students had leaked a false itinerary of the move to throw off the authorities and moved the statue's three segments from the Central Academy of Fine Arts to the Square by another route. Students of the other academies assisting in the construction linked arms around the carts for protection in case the authorities arrived. At dusk on May 29, with fewer than 10,000 protesters remaining in the square, the Art Students constructed bamboo scaffolding and then began assembling the statue. Troops called in to disrupt the movement and construction of the statue were "stalled en route by Beijing residents." By the early morning of May 30, the statue was fully assembled in Tiananmen Square. It broke up the north–south axis of the Square, standing between the Monument to the People's Heroes, and the Tiananmen Gate (which it faced looking at its large photograph of Mao Zedong). Whether the students had intended it or not "dozens of television cameras expertly framed the ironic, silent confrontation between Goddess and chairman." When the time came for the actual unveiling, On May 30, 1989, two Beijing residents, a woman and a man, were chosen at random from the crowd and invited into the circle to pull the strings that would remove the pieces of red and blue cloth. The crowd burst into cheers and shouted slogans such as "Long live democracy!"

With the construction of the statue "The students, their flagging spirits revived, announced their determination to continue occupying the Square." While there had been just 10,000 people in the square on the 29th, with its unveiling "As many as 300,000 spectators flocked to the square on 30–31." As one historian relates, "...a crudely sculpted thirty-three-foot high statue would bestow the struggle for democracy with a memorable symbol. ...it attracted thousands of spectators to the Square and angered the authorities, who condemned it as an 'illegal, permanent' structure that would have to be torn down."

== Statement by its creators ==
The art students who created the statue wrote a declaration that said in part:

At this grim moment, what we need most is to remain calm and united in a single purpose. We need a powerful cementing force to strengthen our resolve: That is the Goddess of Democracy. Democracy...You are the symbol of every student in the Square, of the hearts of millions of people. ...Today, here in the People's Square, the people's Goddess stands tall and announces to the whole world: A consciousness of democracy has awakened among the Chinese people! The new era has begun! ...The statue of the Goddess of Democracy is made of plaster, and of course cannot stand here forever. But as the symbol of the people's hearts, she is divine and inviolate. Let those who would sully her beware: the people will not permit this! ...On the day when real democracy and freedom come to China, we must erect another Goddess of Democracy here in the Square, monumental, towering, and permanent. We have strong faith that that day will come at last. We have still another hope: Chinese people, arise! Erect the statue of the Goddess of Democracy in your millions of hearts! Long live the people! Long live freedom! Long live democracy!"

The document was signed by the eight art academies that sponsored the creation of the statue: The Central Academies of Fine Arts, Arts and Crafts, Drama, and Music; the Beijing Film Academy; the Beijing Dance Academy; the National Academy of Chinese Traditional Art; and the Academy of Traditional Music.

The entire statement was written "in rather crude calligraphy" on a long banner placed near the statue, and was read in its entirety by a female student "with a good Mandarin accent" from the Broadcasting Academy.

== Democracy University ==
On June 3 even as the government troops positioned themselves to move on the students, applause erupted from the people gathered around the statue as it was announced there that a Democracy University would now begin classes in the Square with Zhang Boli appointed as its president. Even as classes began by the statue, to the west of the square and at Muxidi thousands of students moved to block the oncoming 27th Army who were armed with tanks, assault rifles, and bayonets. Blood was spilled by 10:30 p.m.

== Fall of the Goddess ==
The soldiers were able to fulfill their timeline of reaching the Square on June 4, 1989, by 1 a.m. through the use of tanks and armored personnel carriers. The Goddess of Democracy had stood for only five days before being destroyed by soldiers of the People's Liberation Army in the assault on Tiananmen that would end the Democracy Movement. The toppling of the Goddess of Democracy was seen by millions across the world on television: "pushed by a tank, it fell forward and to the right, so that its hands and the torch struck the ground first, breaking off." As the statue fell, protestors shouted "Down with Fascism!" and "Bandits! Bandits!" It was "quickly and easily reduced to rubble, mixing with all the other rubble in the Square. To be cleared away by the Army". By 5:40 a.m. a negotiated settlement allowed the remaining students to leave by the south-eastern corner of the square. The army had fulfilled its order to clear the Square by 6:00 am. Clashes continued throughout the city and in other towns across China.

== Replicas ==
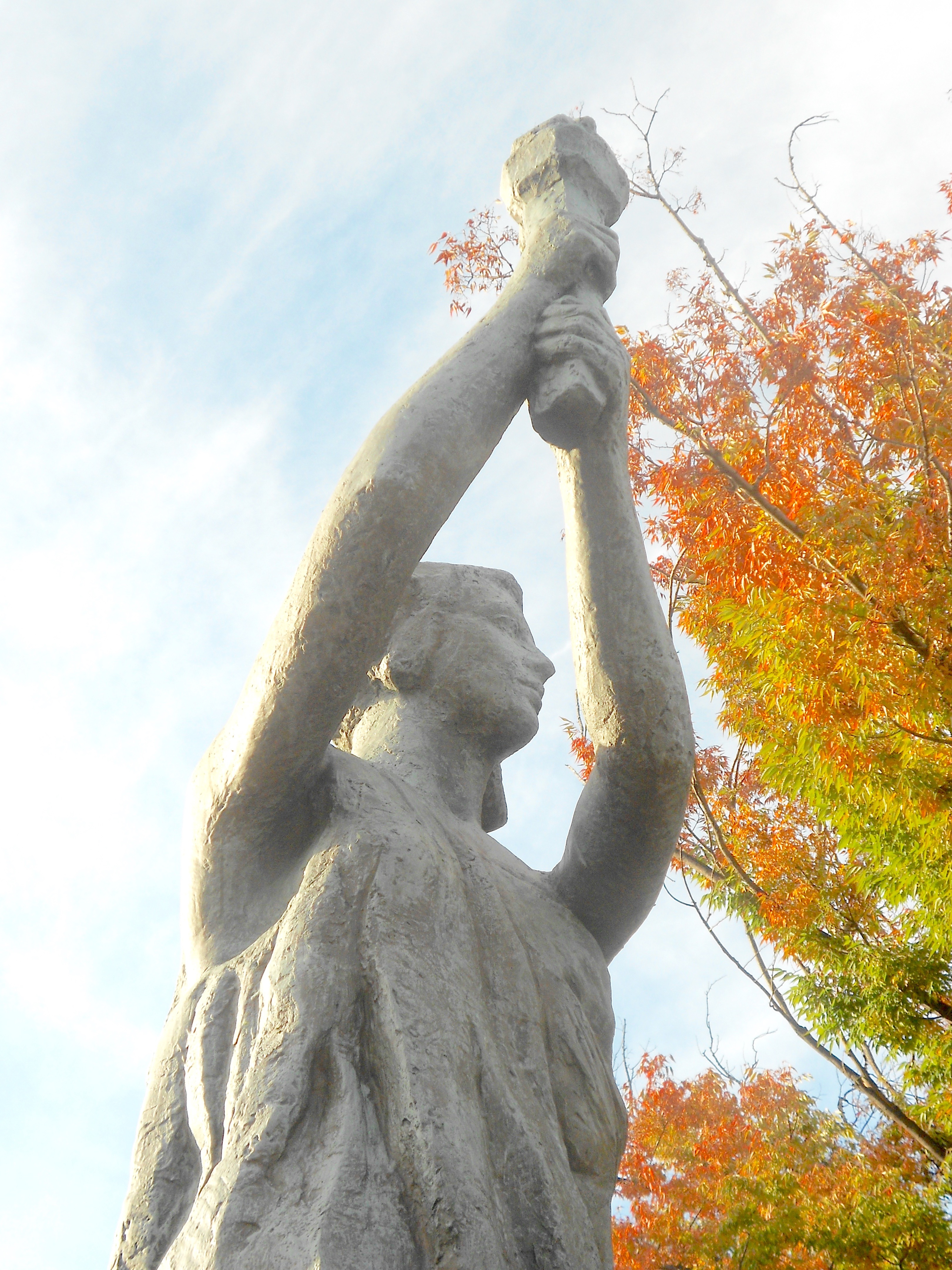
Victims of Communism Memorial in Washington, D.C., recreation by Thomas Marsh

The original statue has become an icon of liberty and a symbol of free speech and democracy movements. The Chinese government has tried to distance itself from any discussions about the original statue or about the Tiananmen Square protests, and in the case of the Victims of Communism Memorial it called the building of a replica an "attempt to defame China".

Several replicas of the statue have been erected worldwide to commemorate the events of 1989:

- A replica erected at a vigil attended by tens of thousands of people in Victoria Park, Hong Kong on June 4, 1996. It was removed on December 23, 2021, by the Hong Kong police due to China's censorship of the Tiananmen Square events.
- A bronze sculpture was begun in 1989, dedicated in 1994, by Thomas Marsh, leading a group of volunteers. Standing in Portsmouth Square, in San Francisco's Chinatown, it weighs approximately 600 pounds (270 kg) and bears the inscription, "Dedicated to Those Who Strive For and Cherish Human Rights and Democracy."
- A copy at the University of British Columbia, erected by the school's Alma Mater Society. This is a 2.7 metres (8.9 ft) epoxy and white marble dust mixture replica erected in 1991. In 2018, the UBC student newspaper detailed the tensions around the piece. In 2019, one of the Grad Class Gifts to the UBC Vancouver campus included "$5,000 to be allocated to the revitalization of the Goddess of Democracy and a Tiananmen Square 30-year recognition ceremony."
- A gilded replica stood in the foyer of the Student Centre at York University in Toronto, Ontario. It was removed in 2011 (allegedly due to its deteriorating condition) and replaced outdoors by a smaller bronze replica outside the Student Centre in June 2012.
- A replica of the San Francisco statue was erected in an outdoor museum in Freedom Park Arlington, Virginia, to commemorate the tenth anniversary of the protests.
- An unknown artist's fiberglass copy was erected at the University of Calgary in 1995, commemorating students who died in the uprisings six years earlier.
- A lantern sculpture of a figure wearing native Taiwanese dress, but standing in a two-handed torch-bearing pose recalling the Goddess of Democracy, was erected in advance of the 2009 World Games in Kaohsiung, Taiwan. The start of the games coincided with the twentieth anniversary of the events in China.
- Two small-scale replicas were built and set up in Hong Kong in 2010 for the Tiananmen Square protests memorial gatherings, but were confiscated by the Hong Kong Police Force after a public display at Times Square Public Space. It was subsequently returned due to serious public opinion pressure, and was displayed at the vigil on June 4, 2010, at Victoria Park. After the candle night memorial gathering, the new 3-meter (10') bronze statue of the Goddess of Democracy was moved to the Chinese University of Hong Kong campus for permanent display at its entrance of University Train Station. The erection of this bronze statue of the Goddess of Democracy was not approved by the university administration but 2000 Chinese university students, staff and alum with many other Hong Kong citizen worked together after the Victoria Park gathering to guard the statue to move to Chinese University campus.
- The Democracy Award given by the National Endowment for Democracy is a small-scale replica of the Goddess of Democracy.
- A 10 ft (3-meter) bronze replica, Victims of Communism Memorial, is in Washington, D.C.
- An augmented reality version of the statue created by the artists collective 4Gentlemen, part of Tiananmen SquARed, a two part augmented reality public art project and memorial.

Tsao Tsing-yuan, an advisor to the students who built the original, writes "I myself envision a day when another replica, as large as the original and more permanent, stands in Tiananmen Square, with the names of those who died there written in gold on its base. It may well stand there after the Chairman Mao's Mausoleum has, in its turn, been pulled down."

== Gallery ==
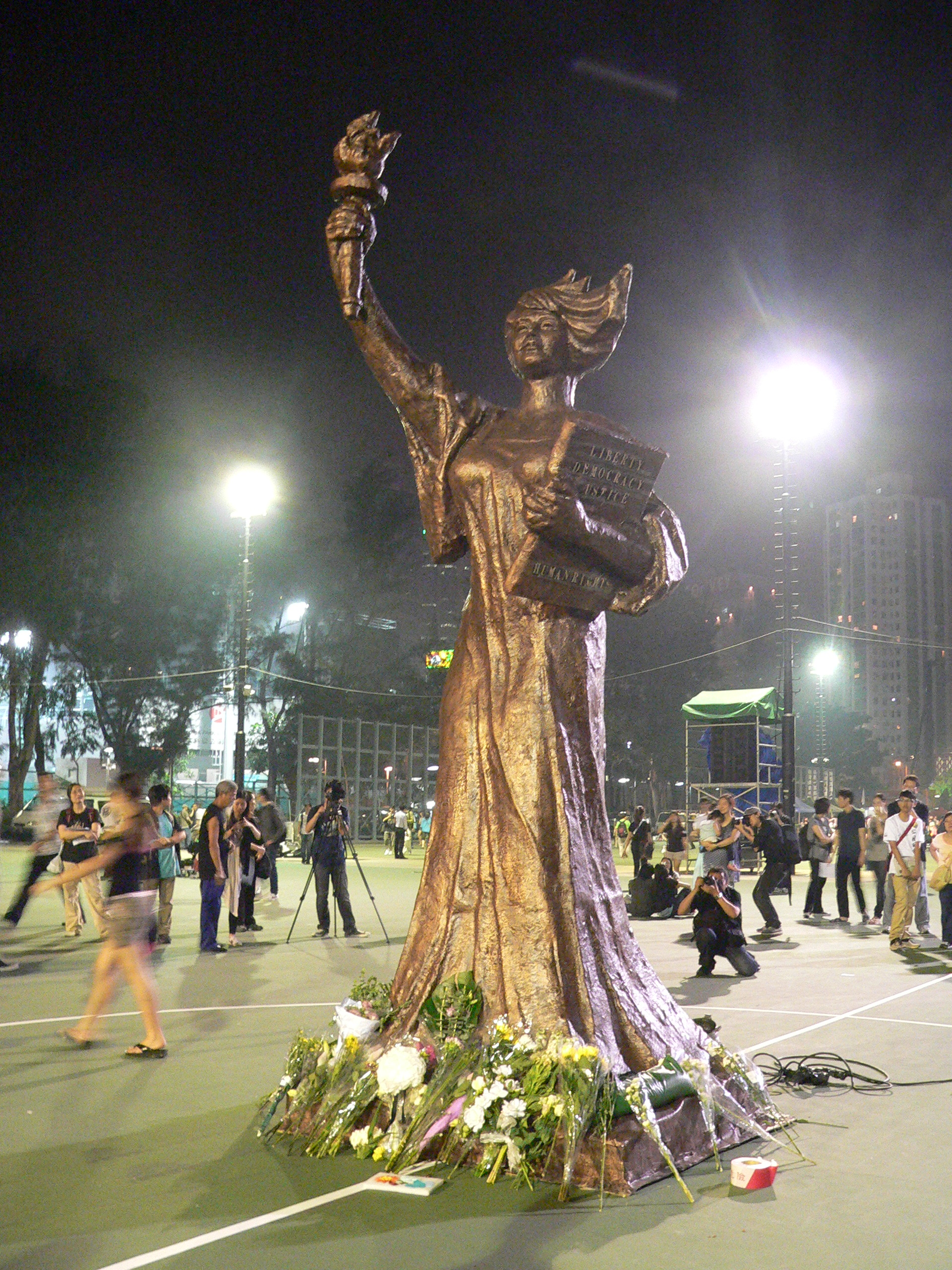
A Goddess of Democracy statue in a different pose, in Hong Kong at the 21st anniversary of the Tiananmen protests of 1989

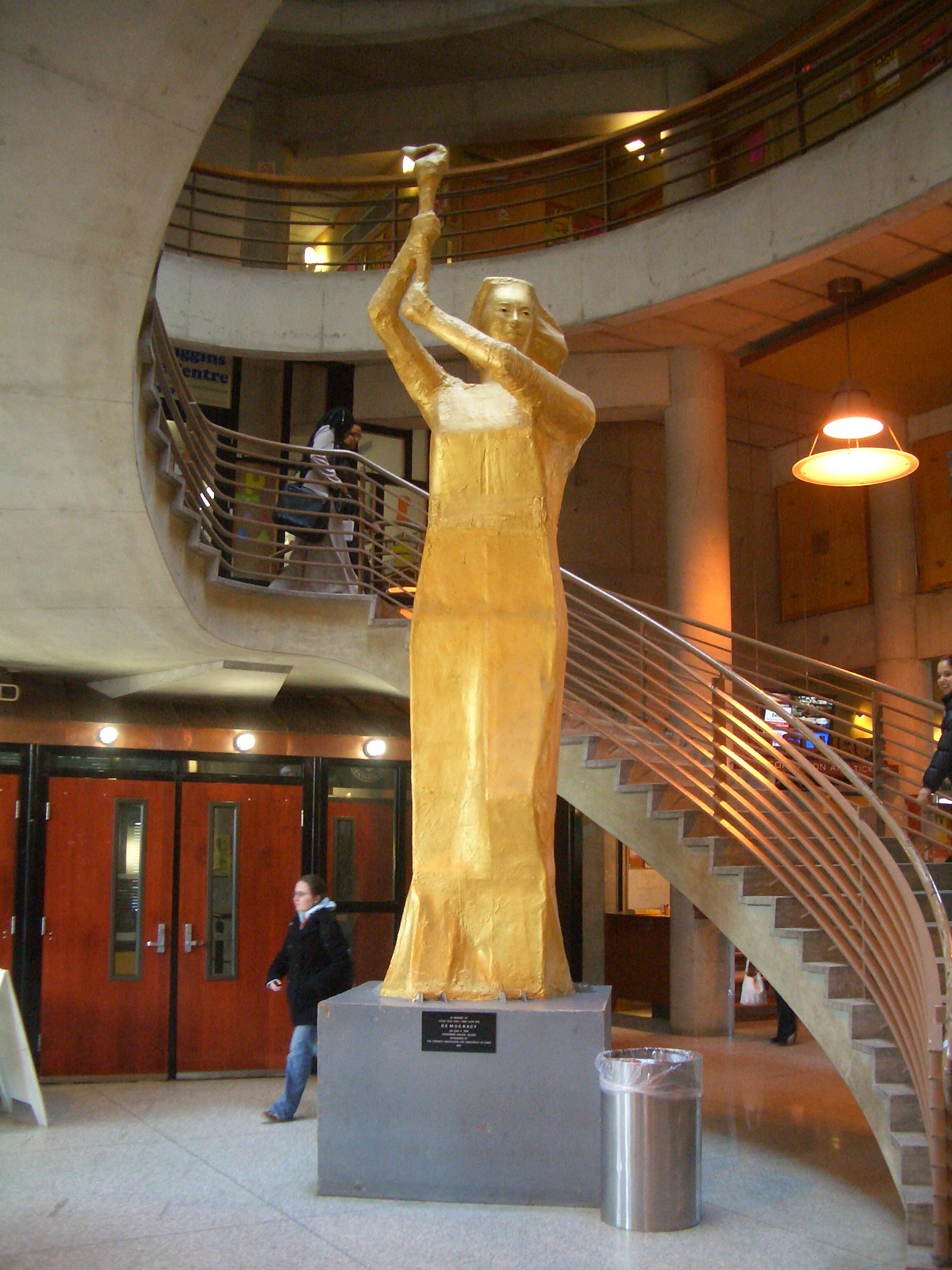
The former statue at York University in Canada

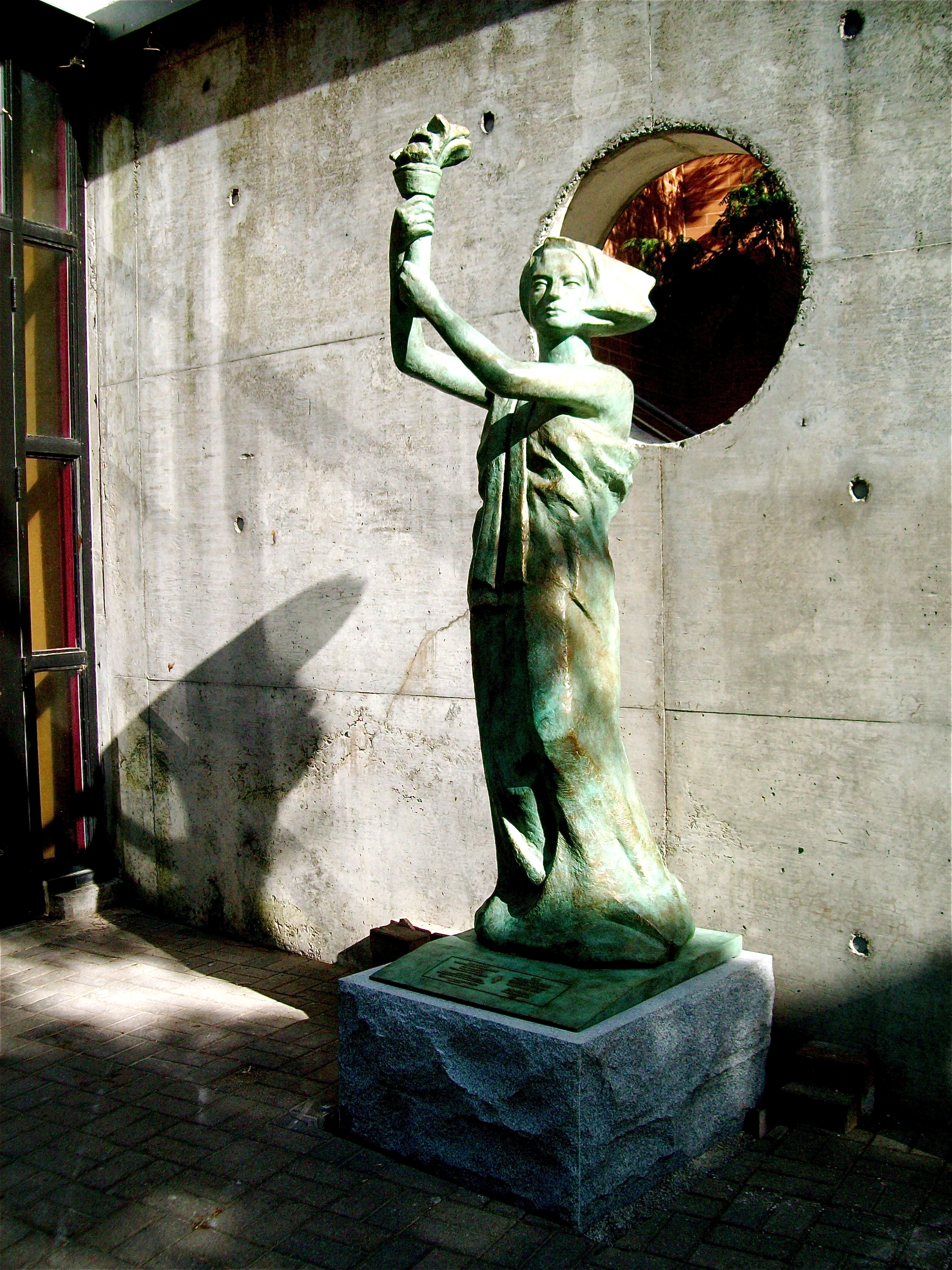
The new bronze statue at York University in Canada (unveiled June 4, 2012)

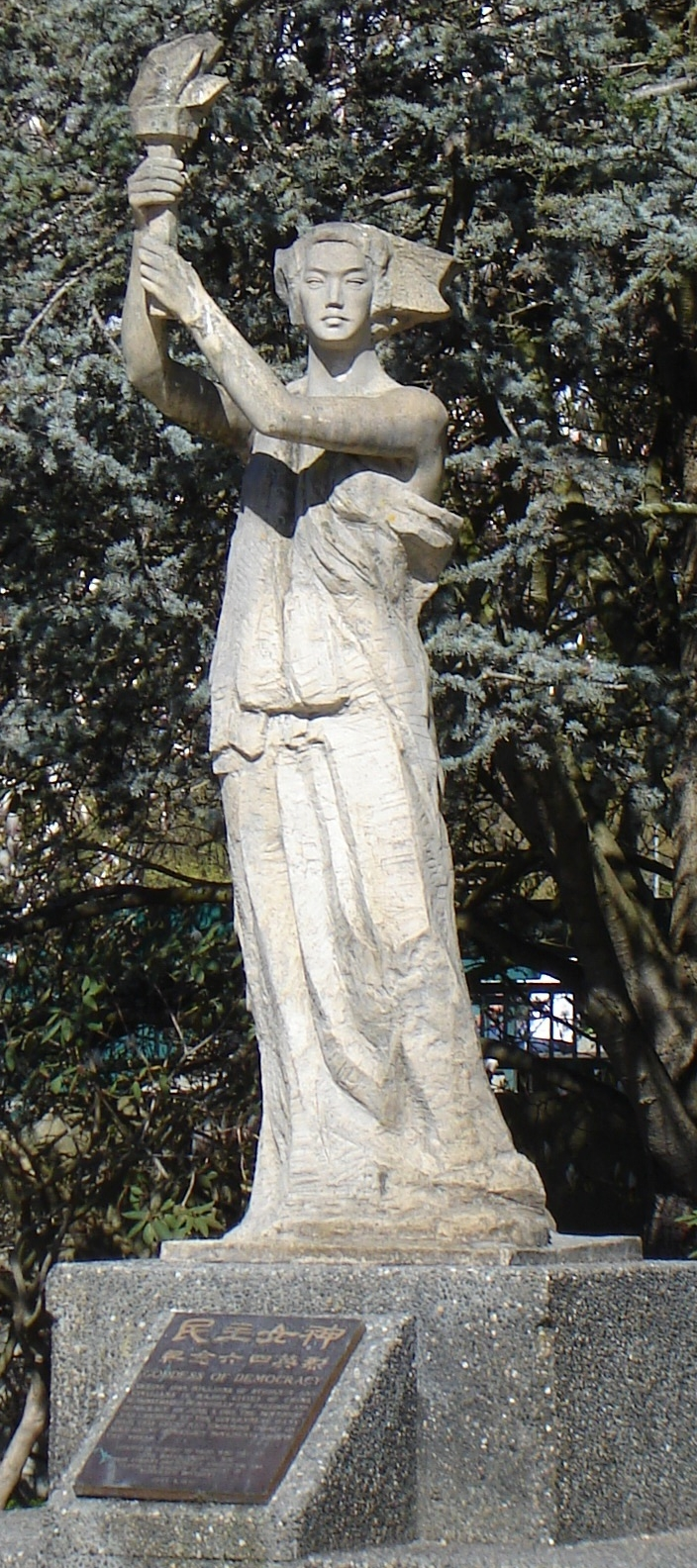
Goddess of Democracy replica at the Vancouver campus of the University of British Columbia

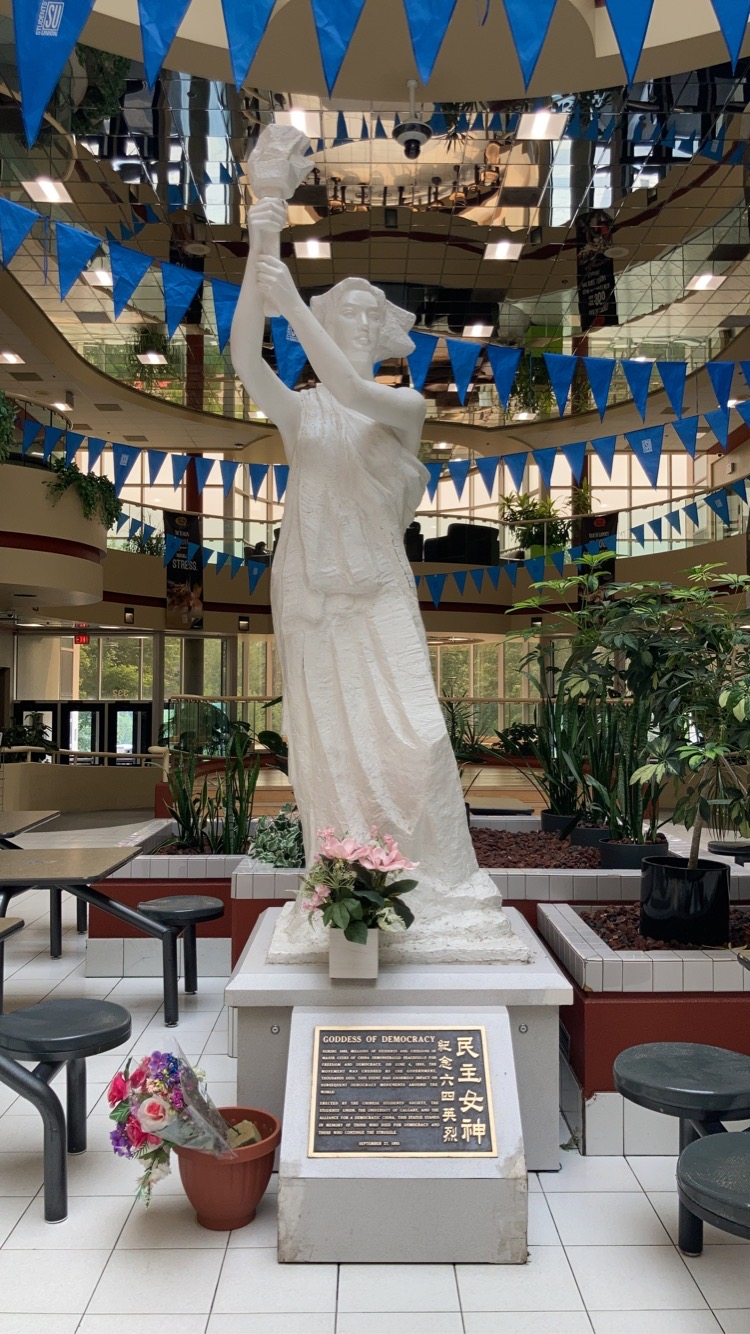
A Goddess of Democracy inside of the University of Calgary in Calgary, Canada

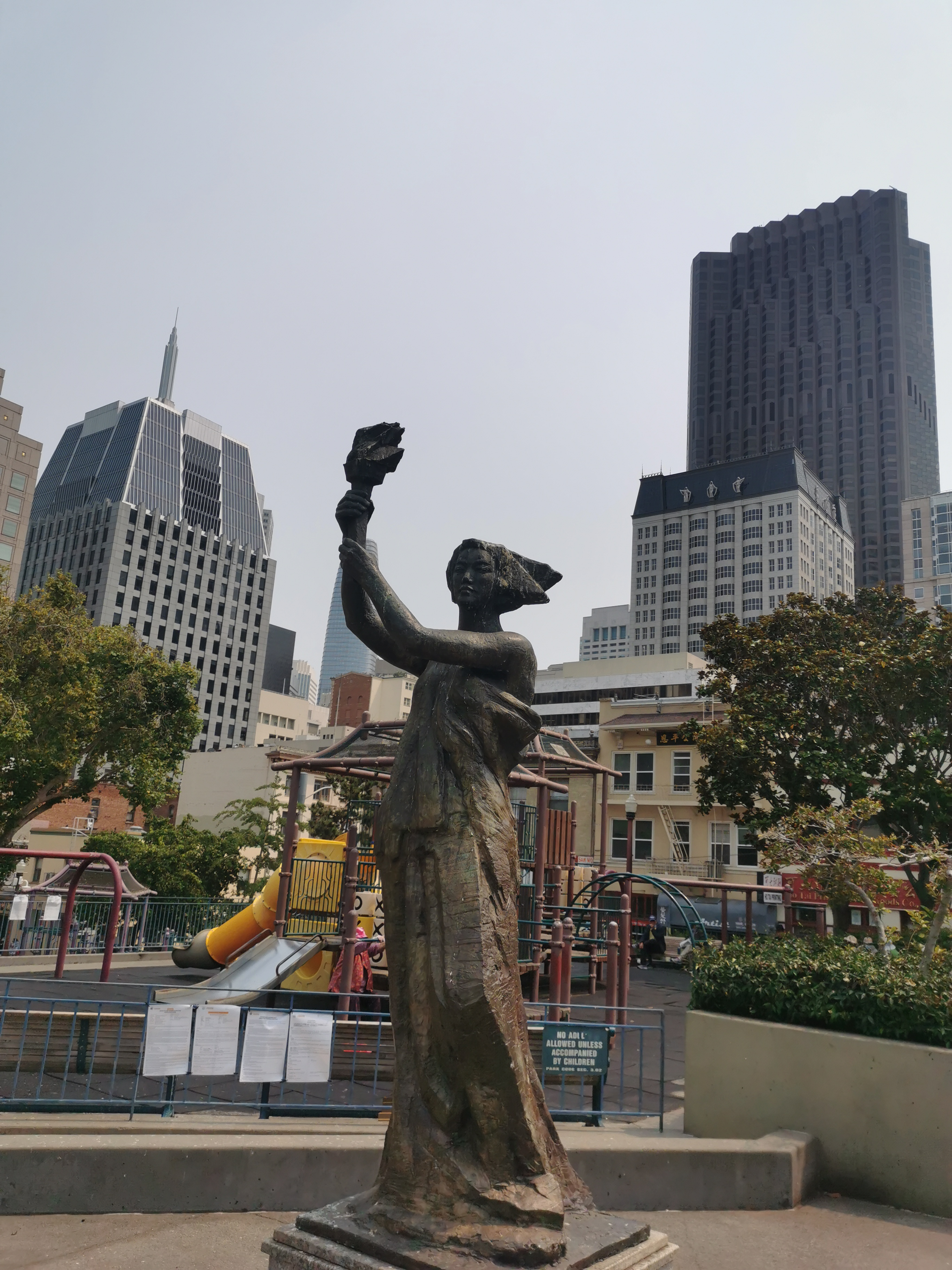
A Goddess of Democracy in San Francisco Chinatown, California

== See also ==
- Worker and Kolkhoz Woman
- Statue of Liberty (Liberty Enlightening the World)
- Lady Liberty Hong Kong
