= Robert Louis Stevenson Memorial =

Memorial in Portsmouth Square, San Francisco, California, U.S.

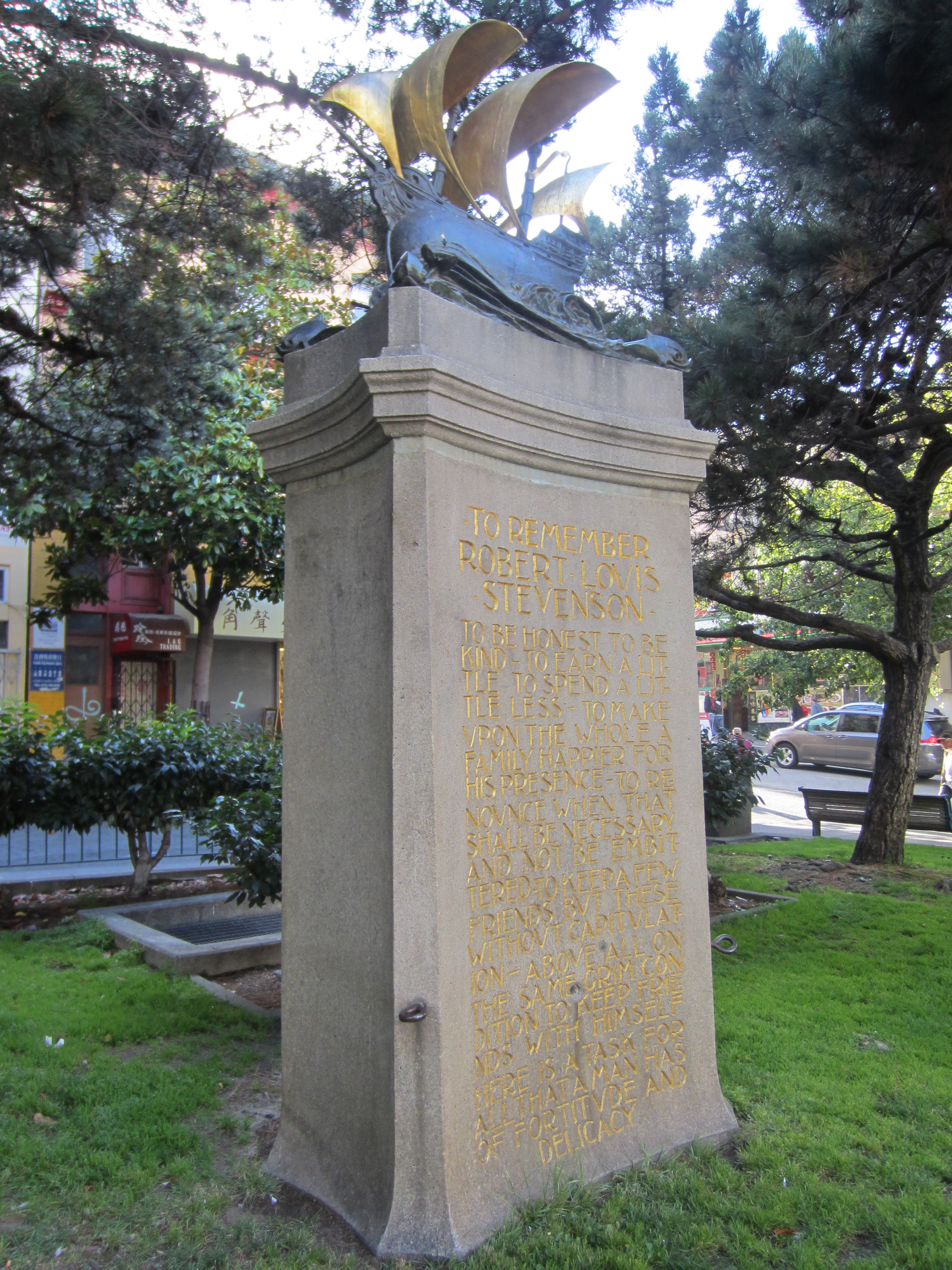
- The memorial in 2013

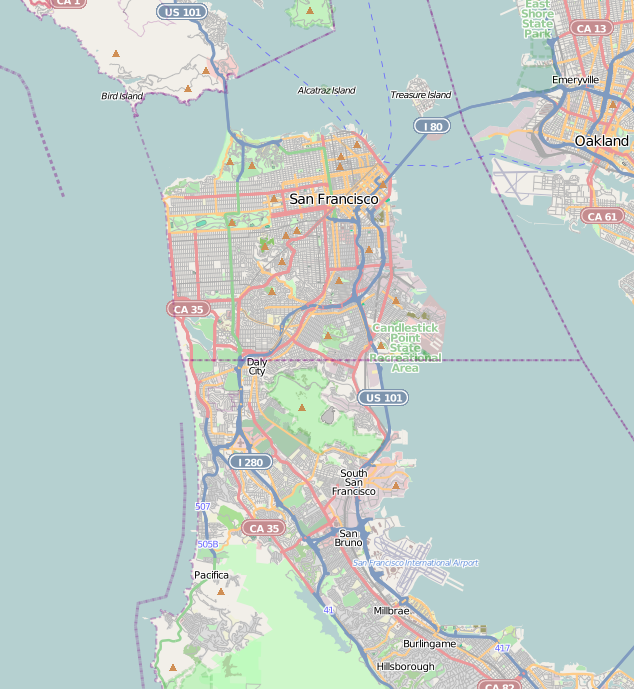
- Location in San Francisco
- Location: San Francisco, California; 37°47′42″N 122°24′21″W

The Robert Louis Stevenson Memorial is an outdoor memorial commemorating Robert Louis Stevenson, in Portsmouth Square, San Francisco, California.

The project was initiated following the author's death in 1894. Willis Polk, architect, Bruce Porter, artist, and Douglas Tilden, sculptor first approached the San Francisco Board of Supervisors with plans. Initially rejected, the plans were simplified and private funding was raised to complete the project in Portsmouth Square, San Francisco where Stevenson had lived just around the corner before moving his family to Samoa in search of health benefits.

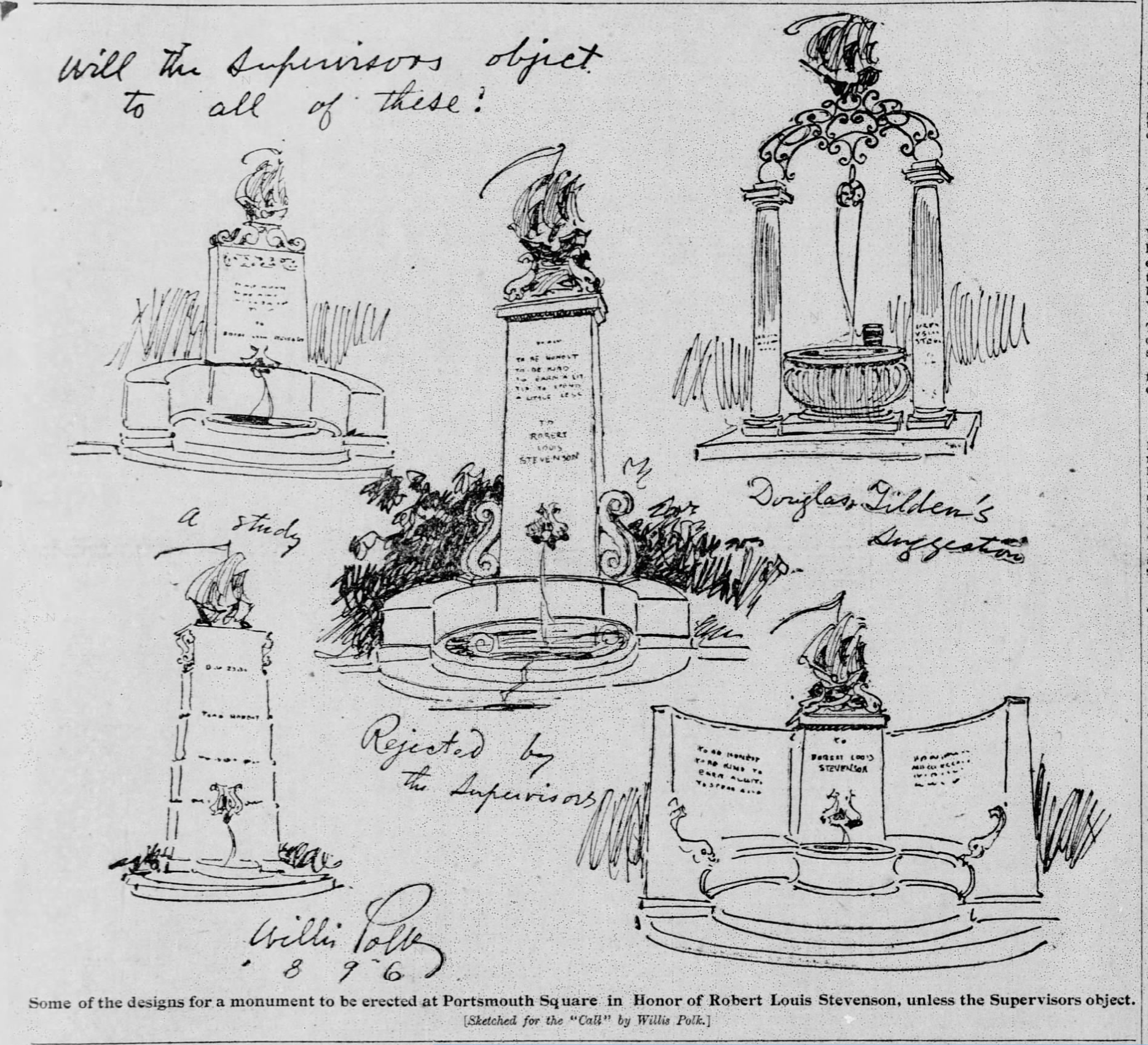
Original Stevenson Memorial sketches
