= Goddess of Democracy (San Francisco) =

Statue in Chinatown, San Francisco, California, U.S.

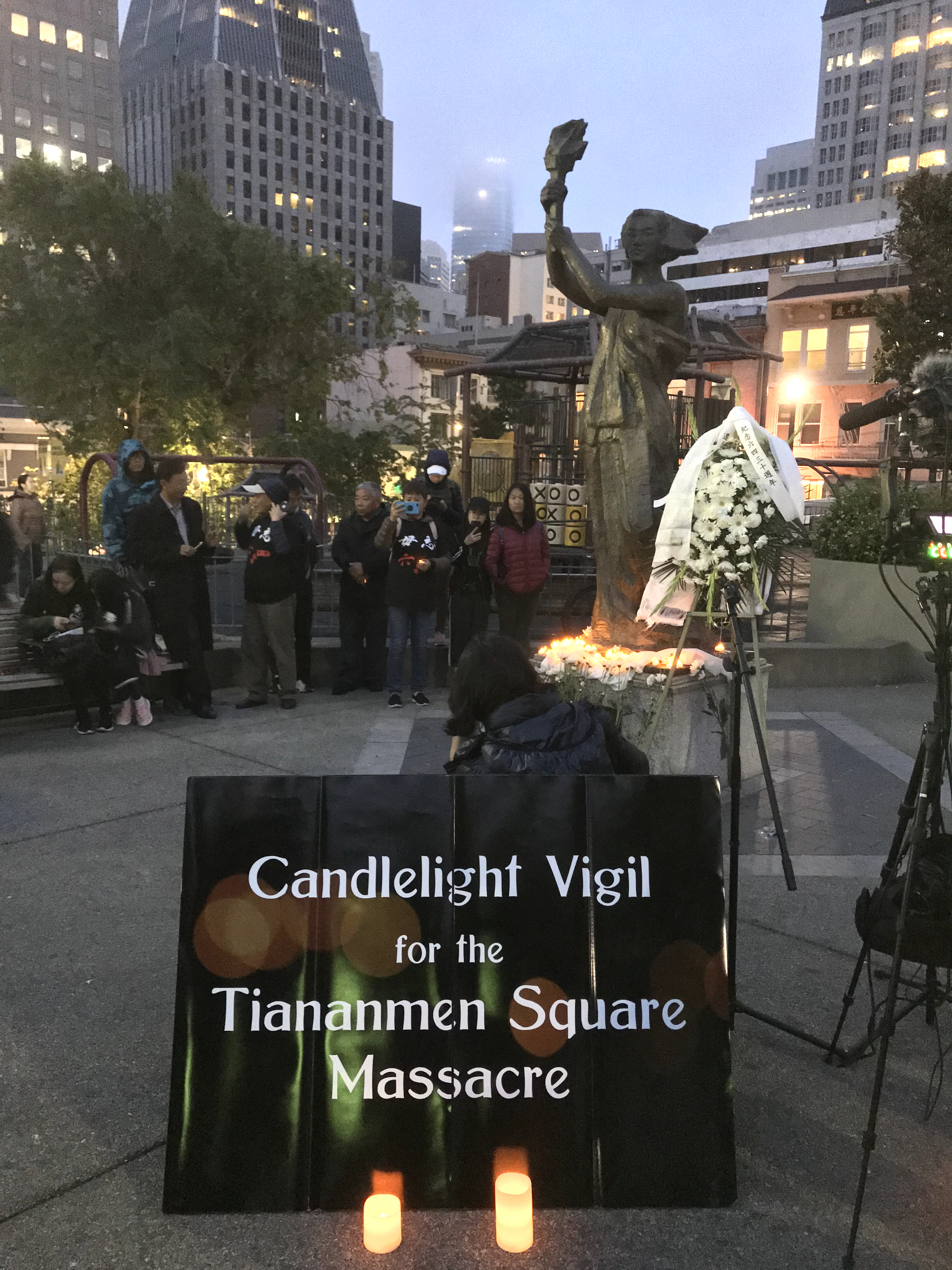
- The statue in 2019
- Medium: Sculpture
- Location: San Francisco, California, United States
- 37.794653°N 122.405201°W

Goddess of Democracy is a replica of the original Goddess of Democracy statue created during the Tiananmen Square protests of 1989, installed in San Francisco's Chinatown, in the U.S. state of California. The sculpture stands in Portsmouth Square.
