= Freedom Park (Arlington, Virginia) =

Linear park in the Rosslyn section of Arlington, Virginia

- Location within Washington, D.C.
- Location: Arlington, Virginia
- Coordinates: 38°53′39″N 77°04′13″W
- Created: 1994

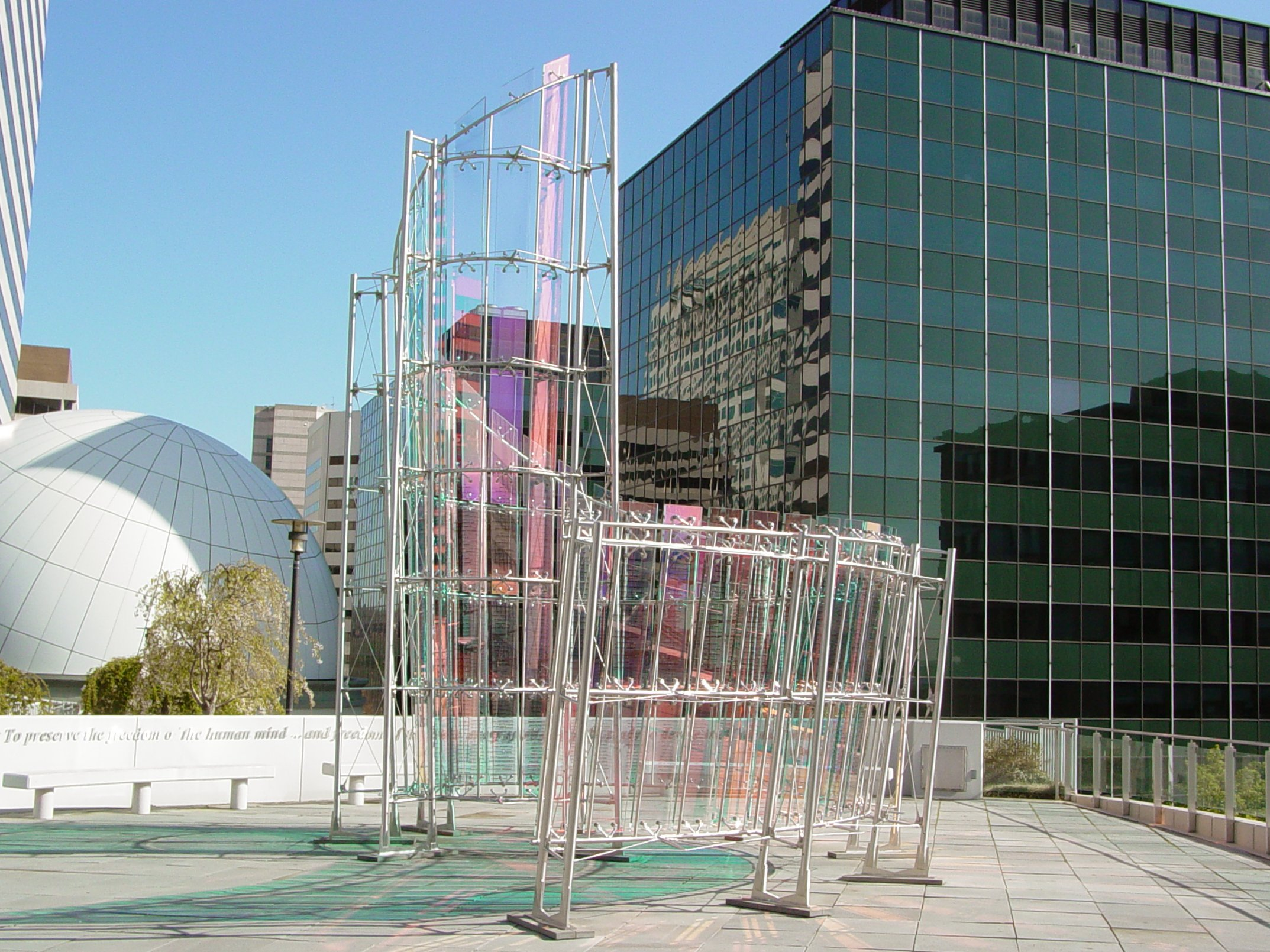
The Journalists' Memorial

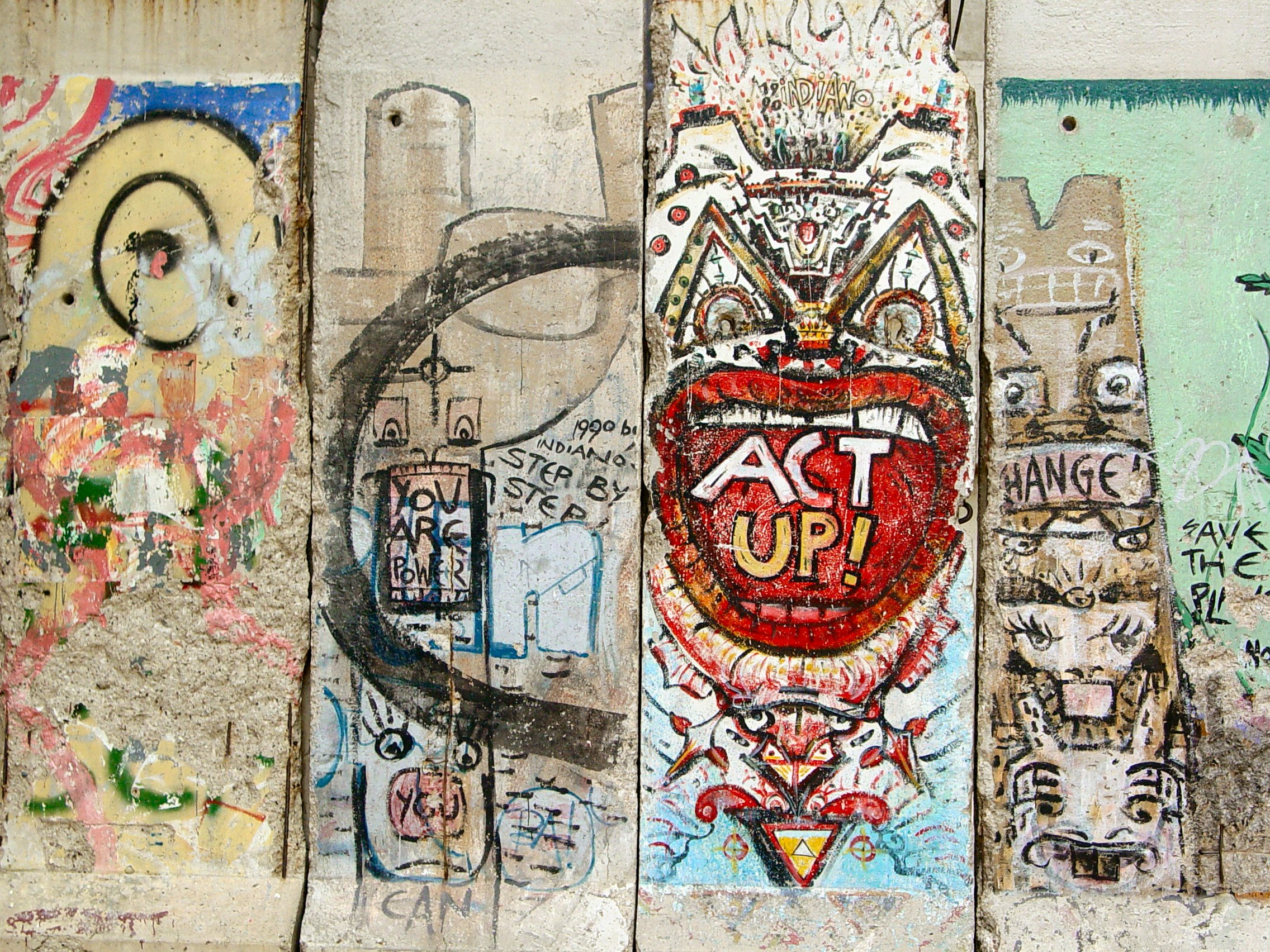
Segments of the Berlin Wall in Freedom Park

Freedom Park is a two block long elevated linear park in the Rosslyn section of Arlington, Virginia. It was built on an elevated concrete structure originally constructed for use as an automobile overpass, and as such, rises above and over the surrounding streets.

The park was founded in 1996 as a joint-venture with the Newseum and Freedom Forum Journalists Memorial, both operated by the Freedom Forum, and was dedicated to the spirit of freedom and the struggle to preserve it. In 2008 the Newseum moved to a new location in the District of Columbia, upon which time a property developer took over operations of the park, and most of the original exhibits were removed.

Today the park is used primarily by residents and workers of Rosslyn as a quiet escape from the busy city below.

== Exhibits ==
=== Current ===
- Spectrum of Freedom, 7 tile murals created by Karen Singer and 270 children from Arlington schools

=== Former exhibits ===
Former exhibits which were removed in 2008 included:

- Stones from the Warsaw Ghetto.
- A headless statue of Vladimir Lenin, one of many that were beheaded when the Soviet Union collapsed in 1991.
- A bronze casting of Martin Luther King Jr.'s Birmingham jail-cell door.
- A bronze casting of a boat used by Cuban refugees.
- A casting of a South African ballot box from the apartheid era.
- Pieces of the Berlin Wall — the largest display of the wall outside of Germany.
- Journalists Memorial, a 24-foot-tall (7.3 m) spiraling memorial made of dichroic glass that honors reporters, editors, photographers and broadcasters who gave their lives reporting the news

A reproduction of the Statue of Freedom, which caps the dome of the United States Capitol, and the Goddess of Democracy, originally constructed for the Tiananmen Square protests in China, were also on display.
