= Portsmouth Square =

Public park in Chinatown, San Francisco, California

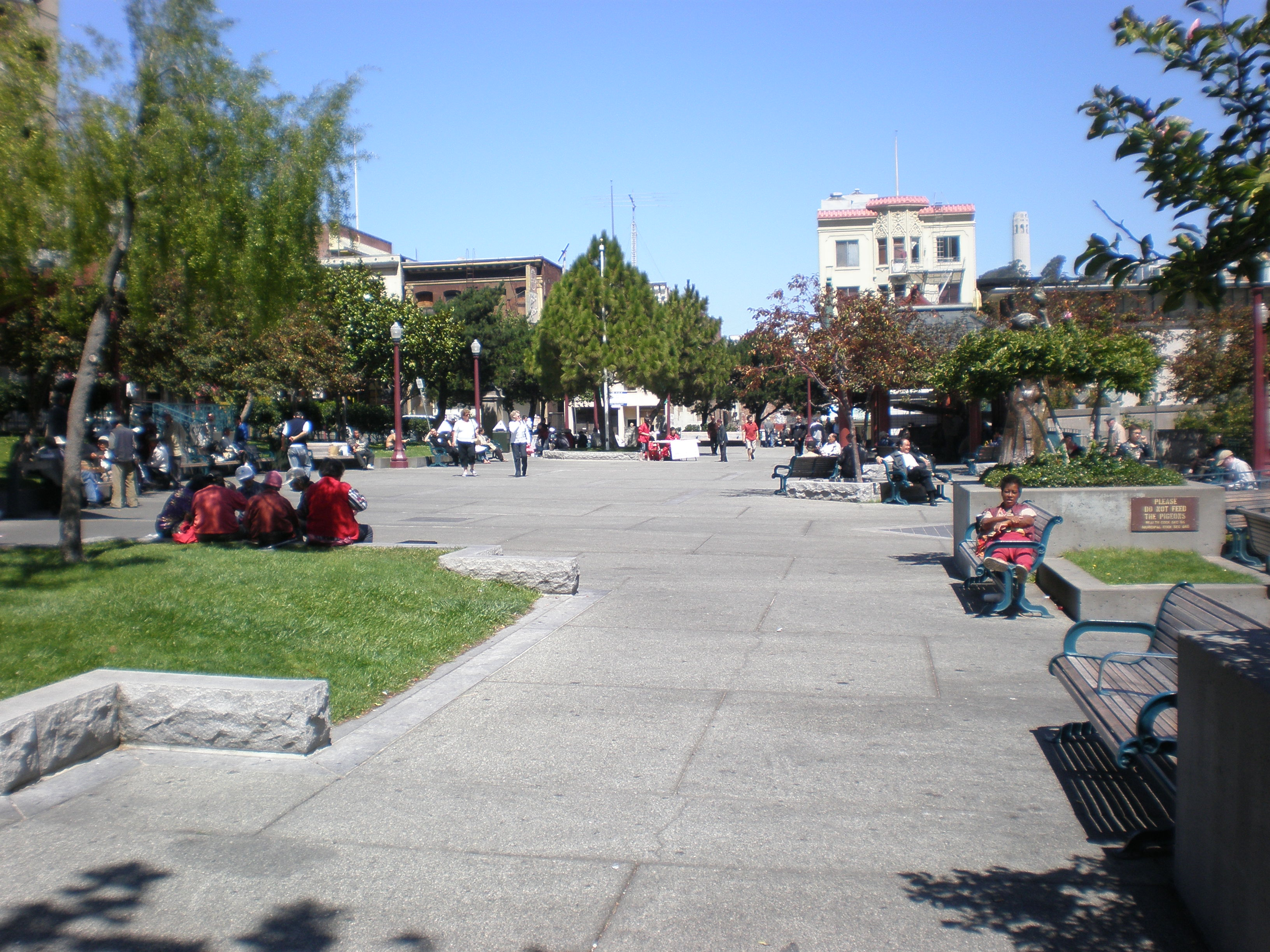
- Interactive map of Portsmouth Square
- Location: Chinatown, San Francisco, California
- Coordinates: 37.7947°N 122.4053°W
- Area: 1.5 acres (0.61 ha; 0.0023 mi^{2}; 0.0061 km^{2})
- Created: 1833
- Owner: San Francisco Recreation & Parks Department
- Operator: San Francisco Recreation & Parks Department
- Open: All year, 5 a.m. to Midnight

California Historical Landmark
- Reference no.: 119; 500; 587; (see below)

Portsmouth Square (traditional Chinese: 花園角; simplified Chinese: 花园角; pinyin: Huāyuán jiǎo; Jyutping: Faa^{1}jyun^{4} Gok^{3}), formerly known as Portsmouth Plaza, and originally known as Plaza de Yerba Buena, or simply La Plaza, is a one-block plaza (1.5-acre (0.61 ha)) in Chinatown, San Francisco, California, United States. Portsmouth Square is the first park in San Francisco, predating both Washington Square (1847) and Union Square (1850). Established in the early 19th century, during the period of Mexican California, the plaza was renamed following the U.S. Conquest of California in honor of the USS Portsmouth, the American ship which captured the city. It is bounded by Kearny Street on the east, Washington Street on the north, Clay Street on the south, and Walter Lum Place on the west.

== History ==
=== Early history ===
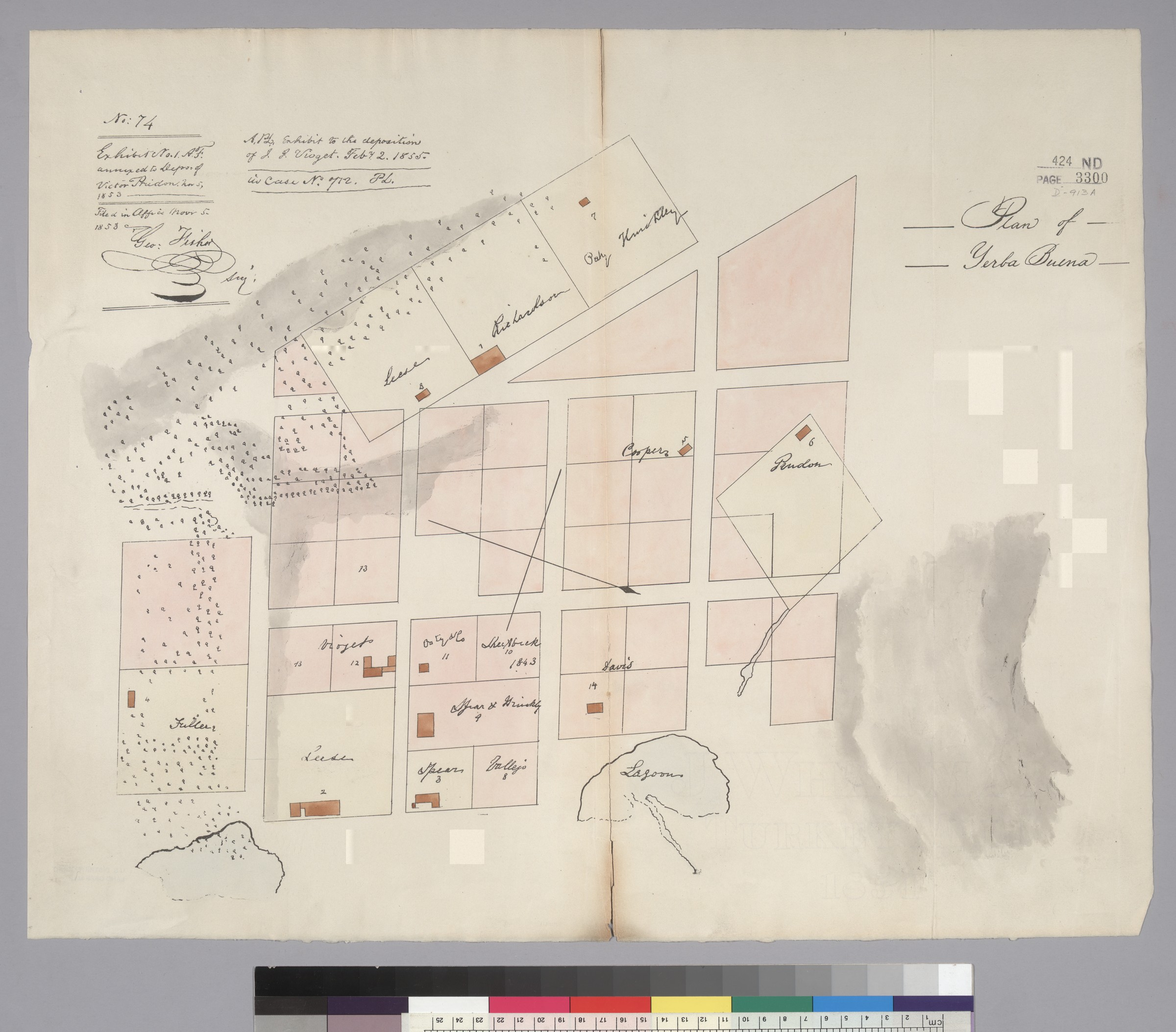
Map of Yerba Buena, drawn by Jean Jacques Vioget in 1839; the Plaza de Yerba Buena (later renamed Portsmouth Square) is just south of the compass rose.

Portsmouth Square is located on the site of the first public square, Plaza de Yerba Buena, established in the early 19th century in the Mexican community of Yerba Buena. The site was first used as a public gathering site in 1833; it was set aside as an official plaza in 1835. Jean Jacques Vioget was commissioned to survey the settlement in 1839, and Vioget imposed a grid of streets centered on the plaza overlooking the cove.

In 1844, a custom house was built at the northwest corner of the plaza by the Mexican government. During the Mexican–American War, Captain John Berrien Montgomery of the USS Portsmouth was ordered to seize Yerba Buena. On July 9, 1846, Montgomery and a party of 17 men landed and raised the first American flag near the Mexican adobe custom house. The plaza would be named Portsmouth Square in honor of the ship later that year, and the settlement's name was changed to San Francisco in 1847.

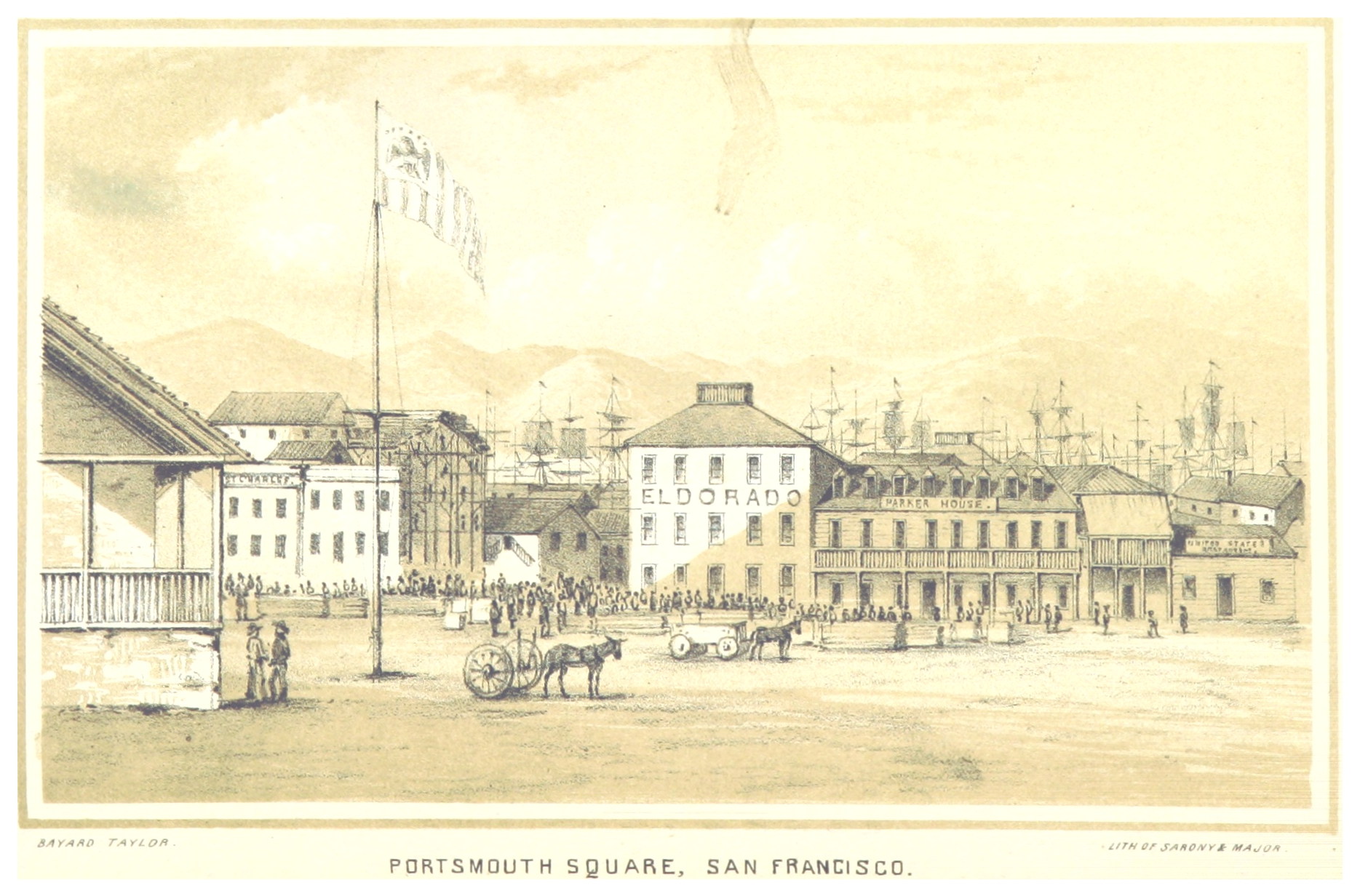
Portsmouth Square, 1850

Many historical events have happened at the plaza:

- In 1847, the first public school in California was erected at the southwest corner of plaza.
- On May 11, 1848, the discovery of gold was announced when Sam Brannan showed his gold to a crowd.
- On June 12, 1849, a crowd was gathered at the plaza, demanding election of delegates at the Monterey Constitutional Convention.
- An assembly was organized on July 16, 1849, to fight against a lawless body, 'The Hounds.'
- On August 29, 1850, a memorial service was held after the death of US President Zachary Taylor.
- The First Admission Day celebration was held October 29, 1850 when California became the 31st state of the United States.
- On June 1, 1852, a crowd protested against the purchase of the Jenny Lind Theatre, across from Portsmouth Square, as the city hall.
- On September 18, 1859, Colonel Edward D. Baker delivered an oration after U.S. Senator David C. Broderick was killed in the Broderick–Terry duel with California Chief Justice David S. Terry.

=== Original park ===
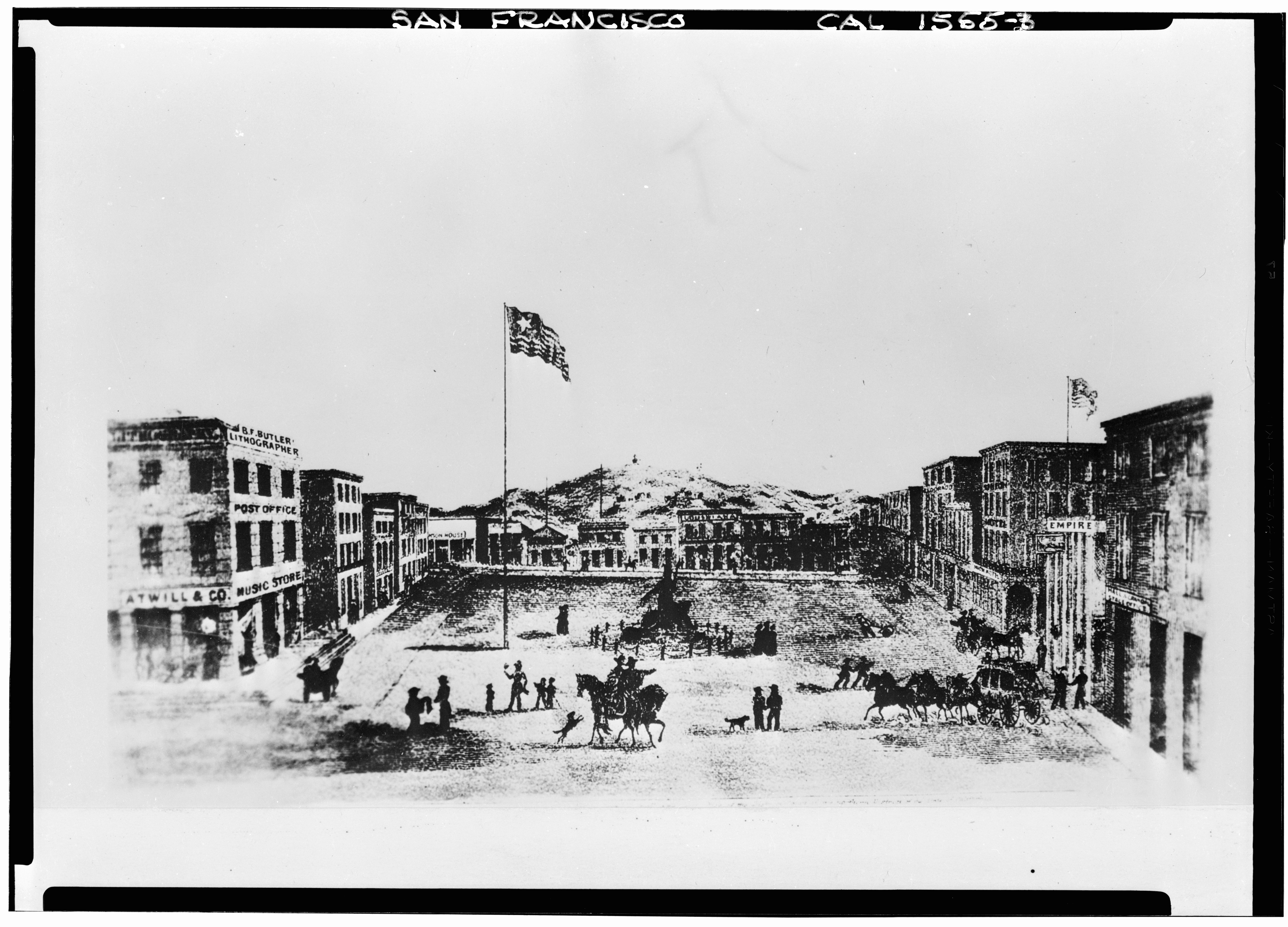
c.1850s: View north from Clay towards Washington. Mostly bare Portsmouth Square.

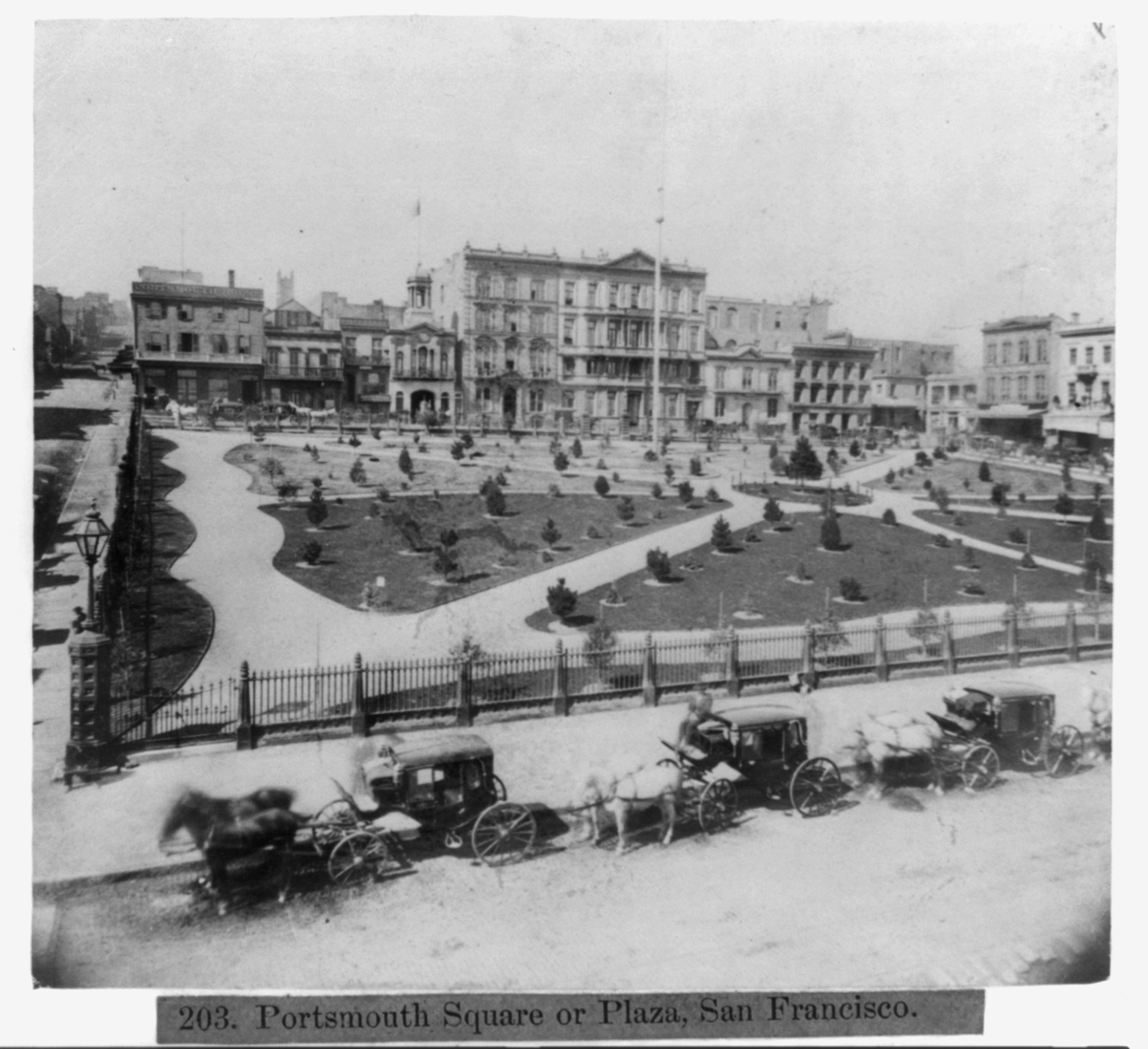
c.1865: View west-northwest from Clay and Kearny towards Brenham Place (now Walter U Lum). Paths have been laid out and trees have been planted.

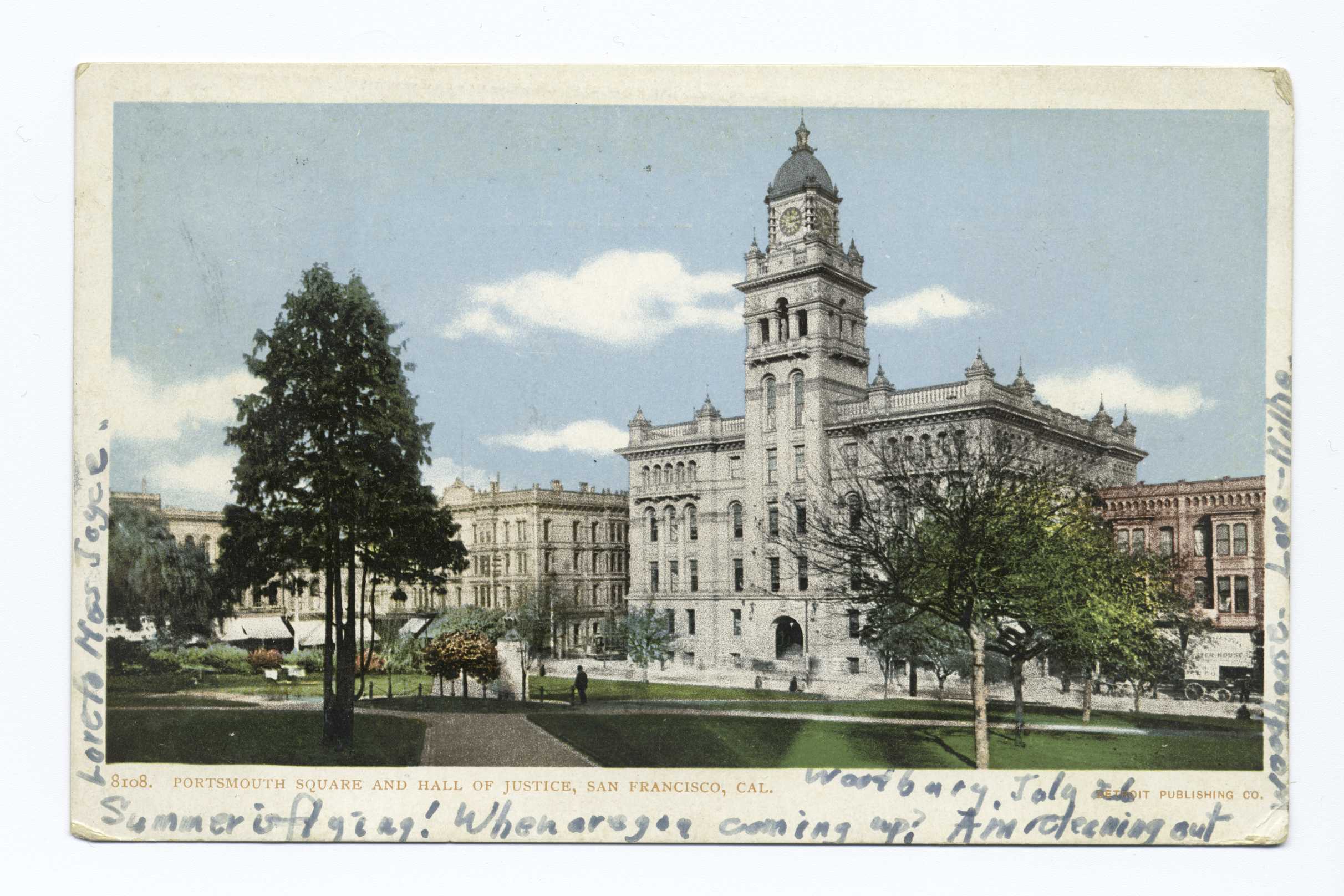
c.1900, view southeast towards Kearny and the Hall of Justice

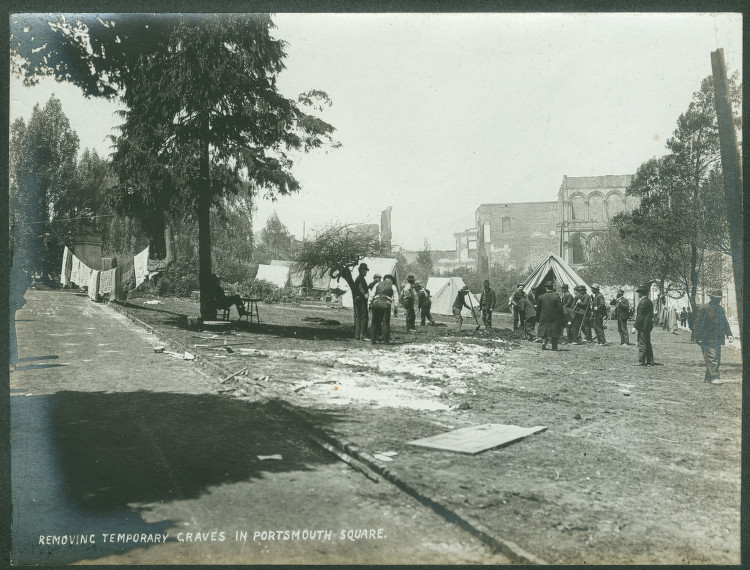
Temporary graves and tents in Portsmouth Square after the 1906 San Francisco earthquake and fire

In the 1860s, the park was laid out with paved paths radiating out from the center, dividing the area into wedge-shaped lawns. Trees were planted and had matured by the time the Square was adopted by the growing Chinese American community as Fa Yuhn Gok (meaning "the garden corner") in the 1880s. By 1905, many of the trees had been cleared and the Robert Louis Stevenson Memorial (erected in 1897) held a prominent spot in the park's central circle.

During the 1906 San Francisco earthquake and fire, Portsmouth Square again served as a gathering location for San Francisco, this time as a temporary tent city for displaced residents and temporary gravesite. The site was renamed Portsmouth Plaza in the late 1920s.

=== Portsmouth Square Garage ===
A parking garage underneath Portsmouth Square was approved in early October 1959 by the San Francisco Board of Supervisors, over significant public opposition. Landscape architect Douglas Baylis was hired to draft plans for the revised park, but he resigned from the project after his original design was modified into "the world's worst" plan that would cause "any landscape architect [to] laugh himself sick" without his consent. Construction on the Portsmouth Square Garage began in 1961, requiring the complete removal of the original park, and completed in 1963. The design was finished by Royston, Hanamoto and Mayes.

The Garage has spaces for 500 cars distributed on four levels of parking, with access from Kearny onto the second level. It extends to a depth of 26 feet (7.9 m) below Kearny and 49 feet (15 m) below Walter U Lum. The level above the entrance level is a partial level. On average, in June 2014 approximately 1500 vehicles used the garage per day. The reinforced concrete garage was cast in place with parking floors and ramps designed to bear a load of 50 lb/ft^{2} (240 kg/m^{2}) as required by building codes.

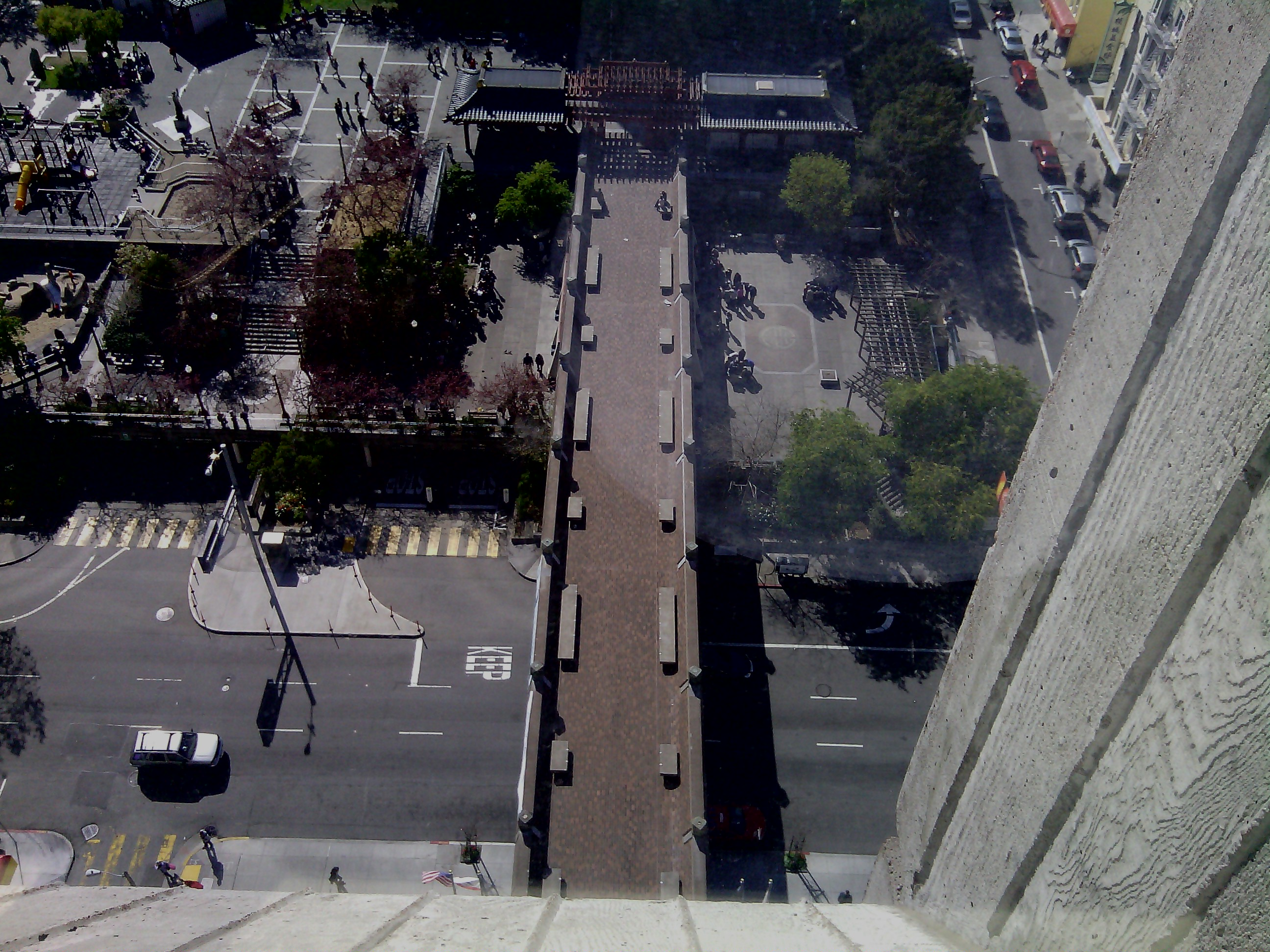
Chinese Culture Center Bridge (completed 1971) over Kearny, facing west towards Portsmouth Square

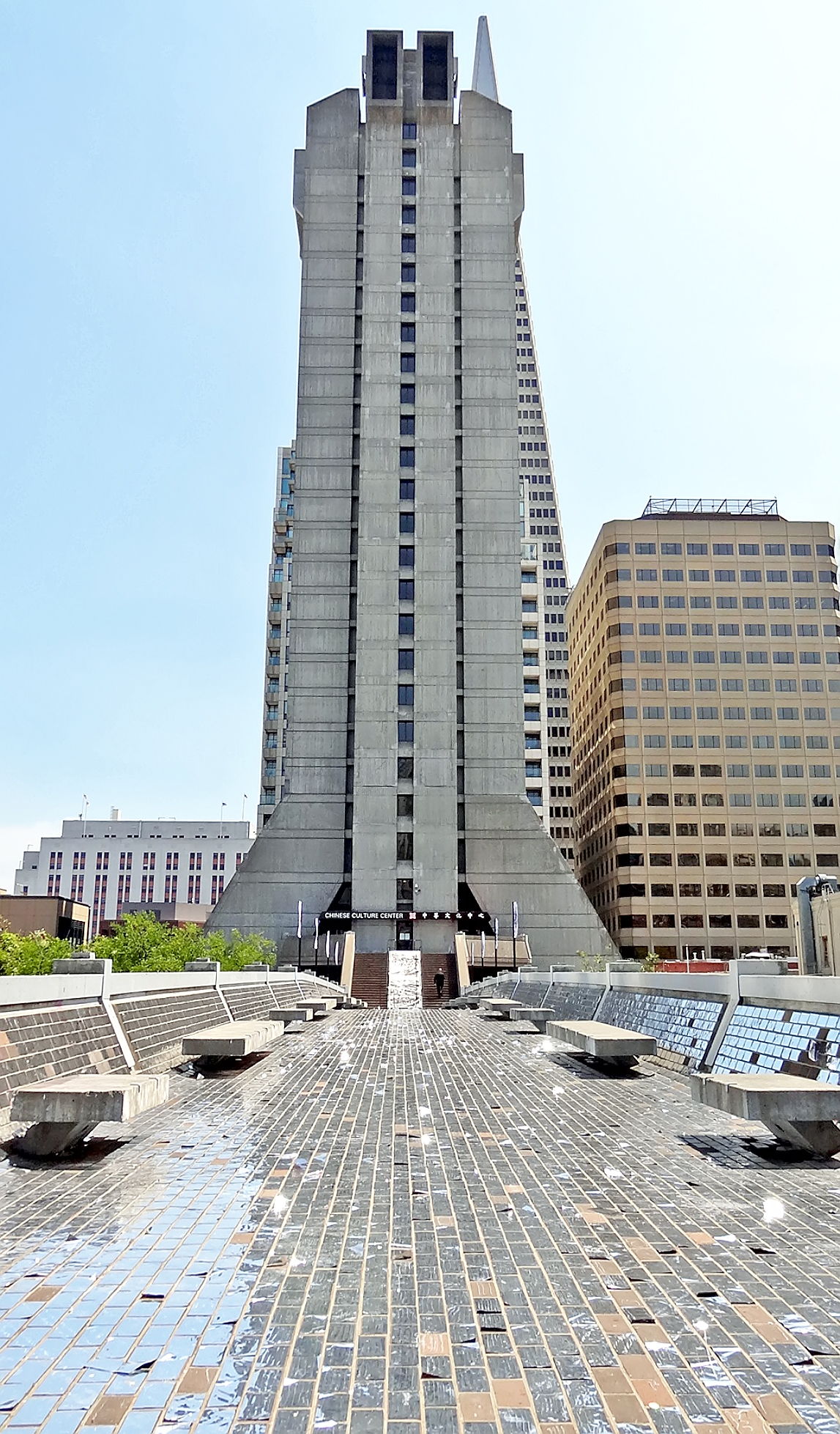
Hilton San Francisco Financial District hotel tower and bridge

When the Holiday Inn (now the Hilton San Francisco Financial District) hotel was designed and constructed in the late 1960s, replacing the old San Francisco Hall of Justice, a pedestrian bridge was added across Kearny to connect the new hotel with the park. On November 18, 1968, Charles Slutzkin of Justice Enterprises (the firm responsible for redeveloping the Hall of Justice site) engaged landscape architect Robert Royston to determine how Portsmouth Square should be modified to accommodate the new bridge; Royston responded in 1970, concluding the existing playground should be enlarged. The playground was completed in 1971–72.

=== Second renovation ===
Recommendations were prepared in the late 1970s ("Chinatown Plan") and early 1980s ("Chinatown Public Improvements Plan"), proposing revisions to Portsmouth Square.

In 1987, the park underwent its second major renovation, taking place over three separate phases. The first phase involved installing new elevators and bathrooms on the top of the park. The second phase began in 1994, included installation of child play structures, Chinese chess tables, benches, and landscaping. Phase three included the construction of a new community room and play areas. This $3.9 million renovation was completed and the park was opened to the public in 2001.

=== Today ===
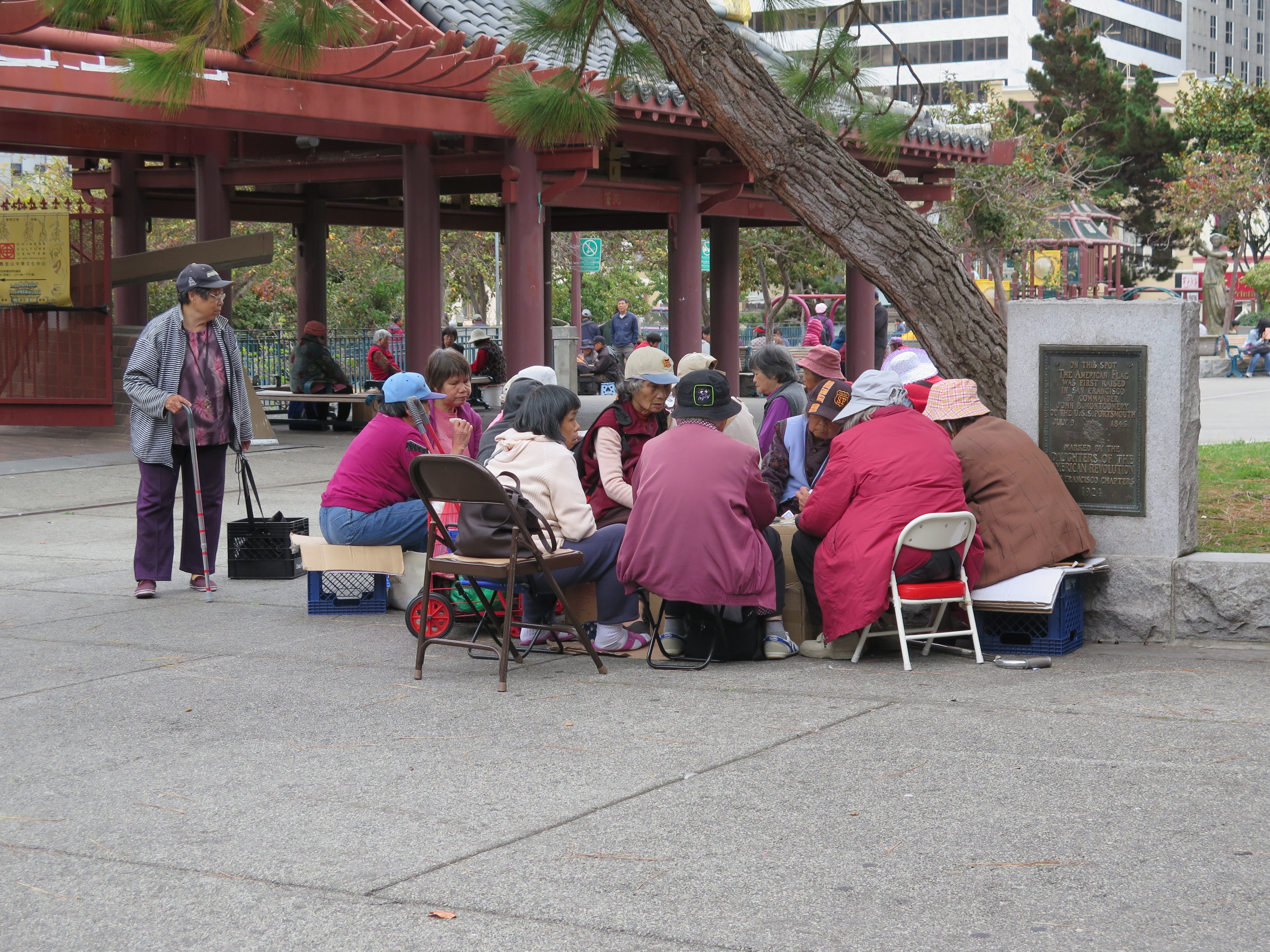
Playing games in the northeast corner of the park, near CHL#119 and west of the bridge over Kearny

Portsmouth Square is known as the "Heart" or "Living Room" of Chinatown. Residents of the neighborhood play games, practice tai chi, and socialize in the park.

It was also home for a large number of homeless people. San Francisco Board of Supervisors President Aaron Peskin, who represented the area surrounding the park, and Mayor Gavin Newsom have criticized the Department of Recreation and Parks for failing in its upkeep of the park. Regarding these criticisms, the city department has tried to hire additional gardeners and custodians despite budget cuts. Another city department, Public Works, was urged by Newsom to help clean up the park, at least temporarily.

==== New renovation ====
The San Francisco Planning Department has initiated the Portsmouth Square Area Project to enhance the space and surrounding streets. A report evaluating the existing conditions and feasibility of updates was completed in December 2014. On October 13, 2020, the Recreation and Park Department announced that the schematic design was complete.

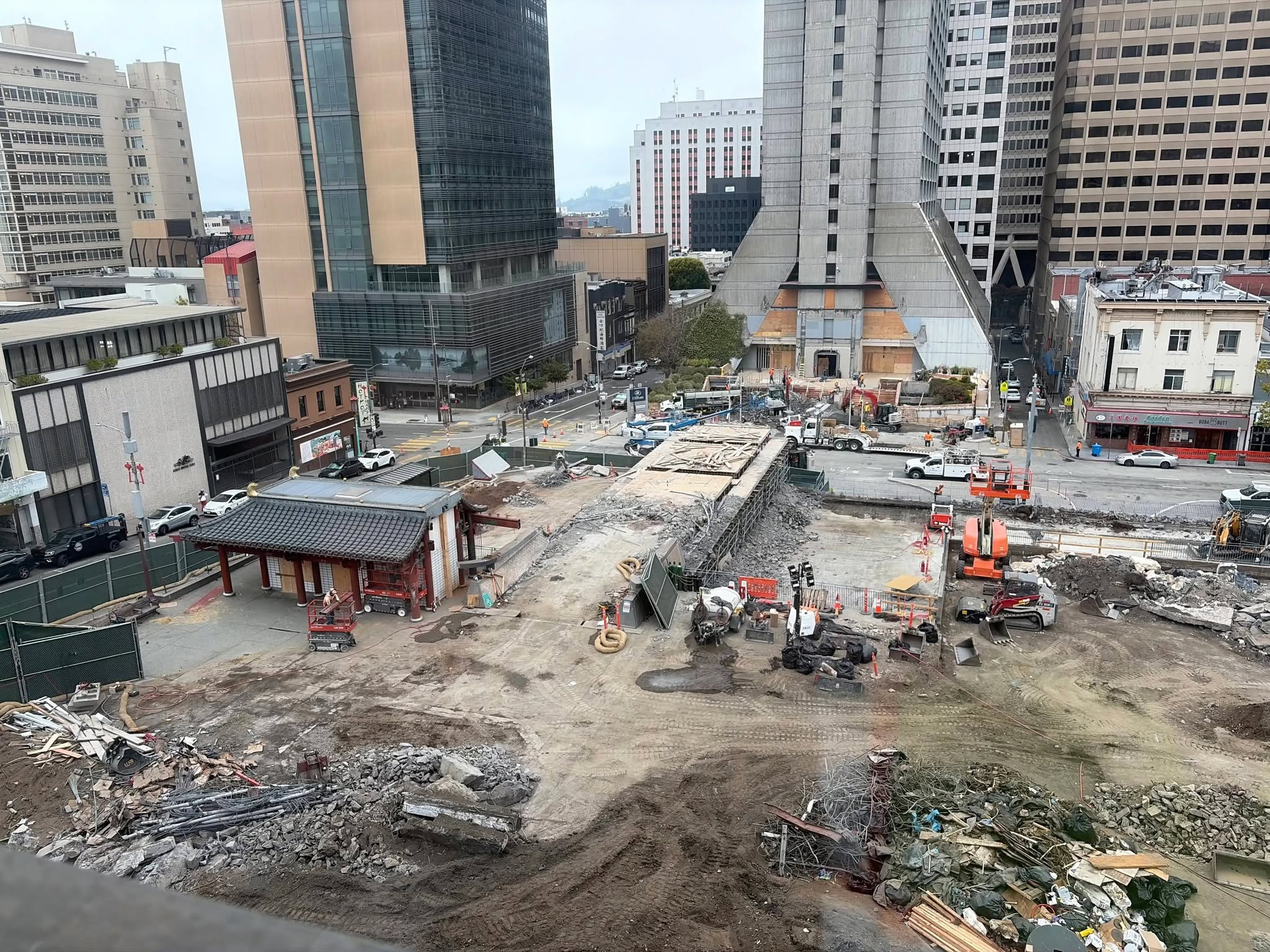
Demolition in August 2026

The groundbreaking for the redesign was anticipated to be held in the fall of 2025. However, in June 2025, it was reported that due to the tariffs in the second Trump administration, the redesign project would be delayed. The tariffs created high inflation, particularly on construction costs, which resulted in the bids for the project exceeding the originally cited costs by over $10 million. The city will do another bidding process and will delay groundbreaking until at least the spring of 2026.

== Design and features ==
A four-level underground parking garage is located beneath Portsmouth Square, accommodating an average of 50,000 vehicles per month.

=== Historical markers and memorials ===
California Historical Landmarks in Portsmouth Square

#119: raising the first American flag

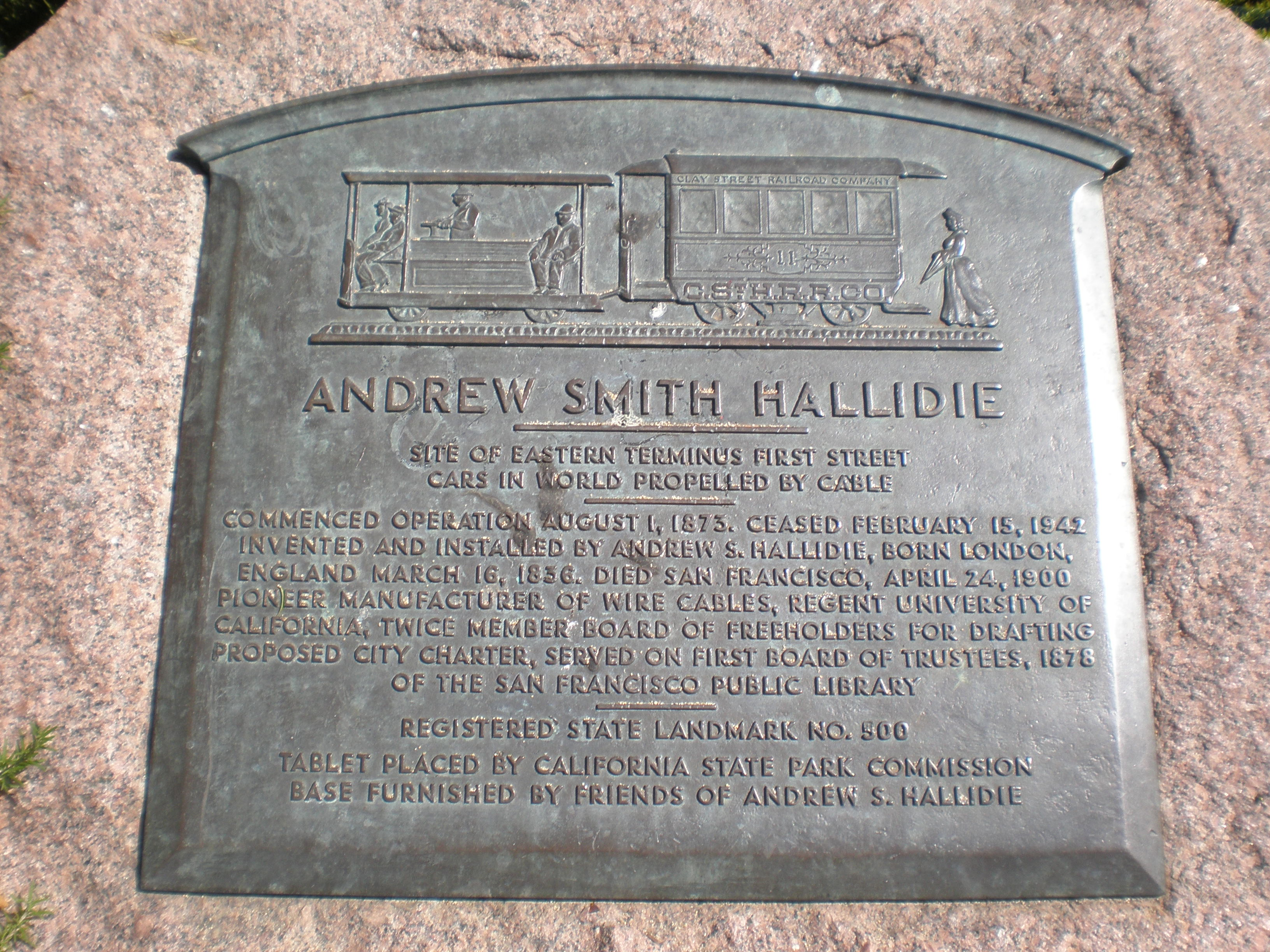
#500: eastern terminus of first cable car system

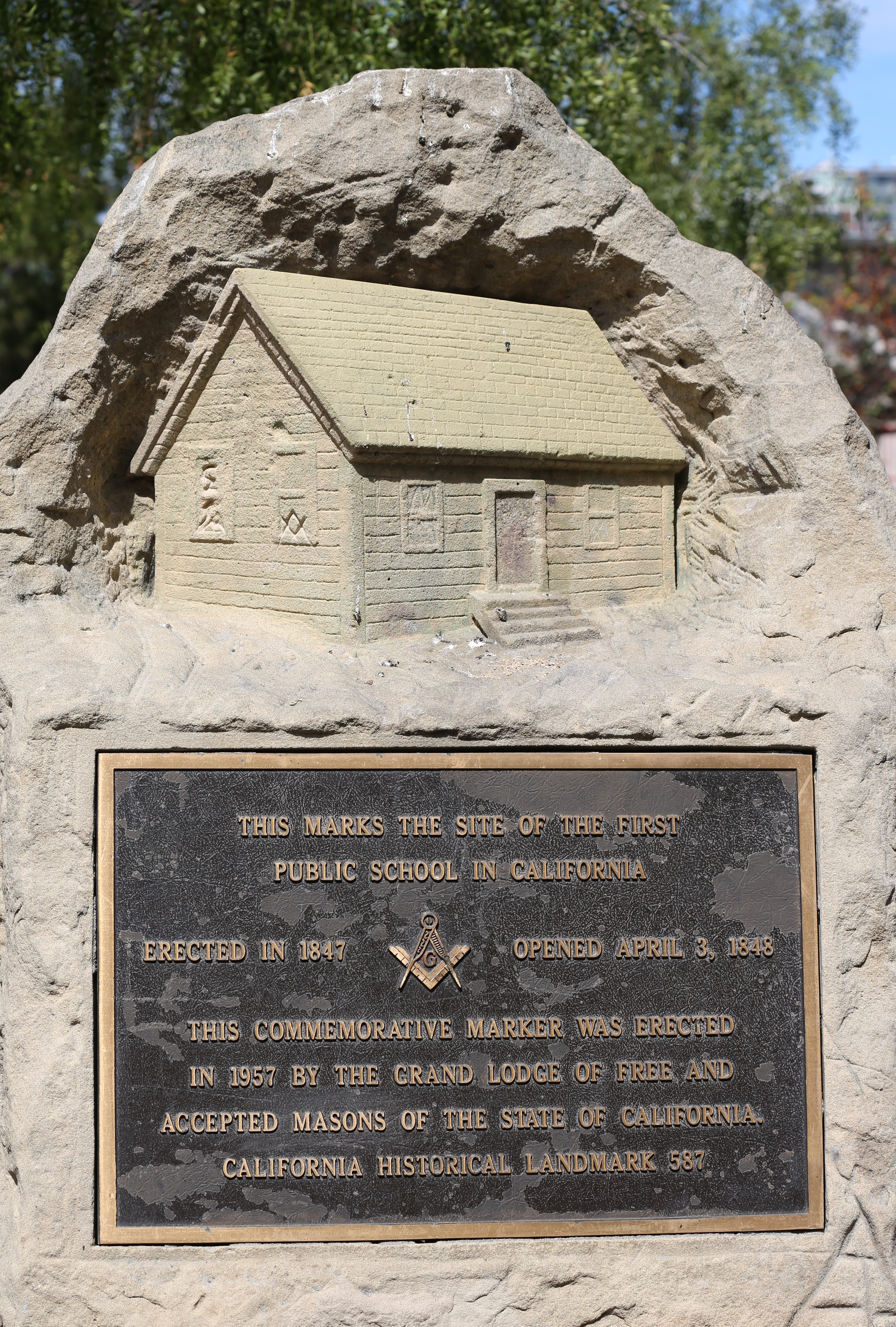
#587: first public school in California

It features many markers and statues. There are three markers registered as California Historical Landmarks, honoring the first raising of the American flag on the square in 1846 (#119, placed 1924), the Eastern Terminus of the Clay Street Hill Railroad Company (#500, 1953), and the 1848 opening of the first public school in California (#587, 1957).

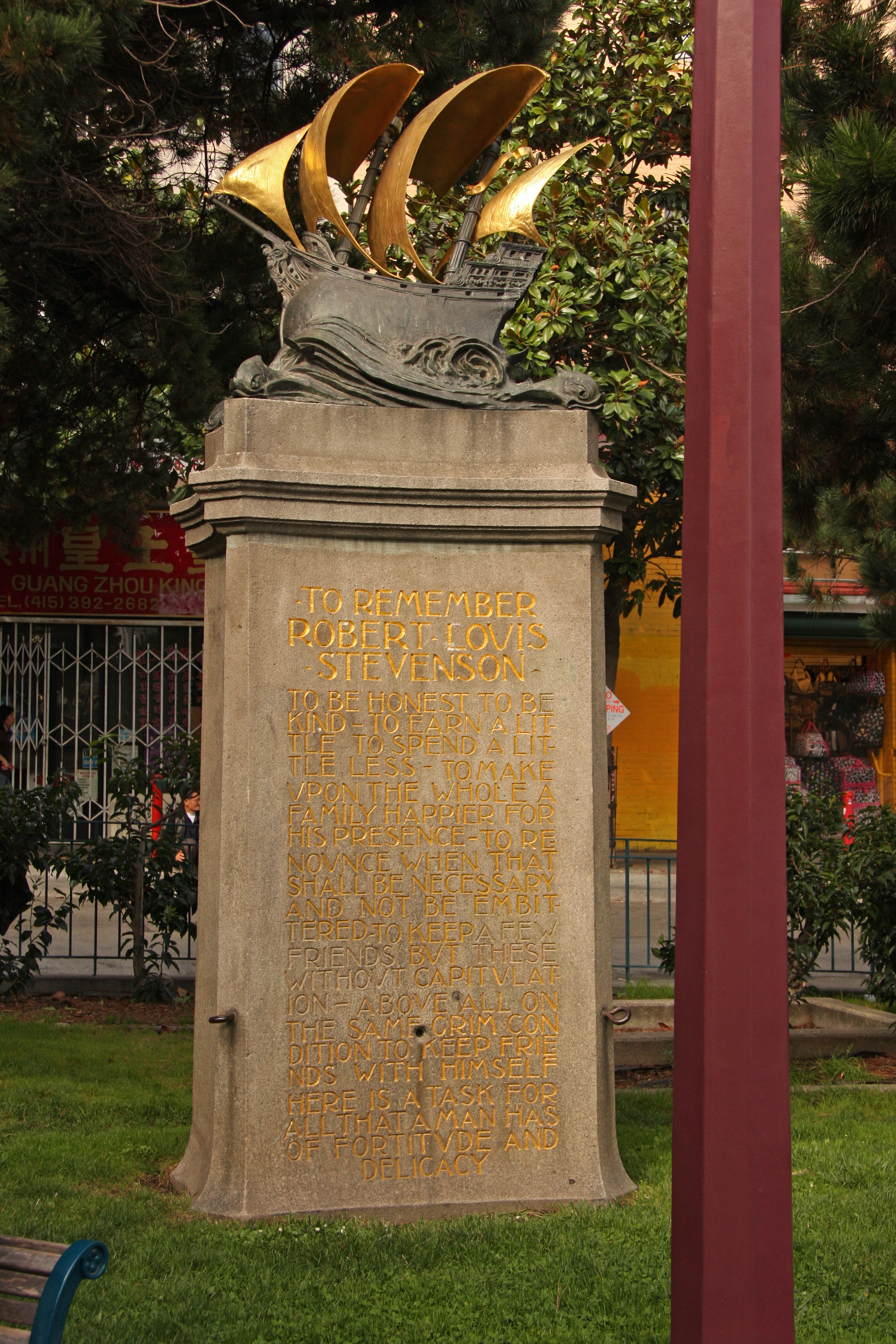
Robert Louis Stevenson Memorial

The Robert Louis Stevenson Memorial is also located inside the park to commemorate its history, designed by Bruce Porter and Willis Polk, and topped with a bronze galleon sculpted by George Piper. The Stevenson Memorial was erected in 1897. In addition, a statue of the Goddess of Democracy, a gift from the San Francisco Goddess of Democracy Statue Project, to commemorate the 1989 Tiananmen Square Protests and massacre to the city, sits in the park.

=== Tot Lot ===
The playground at the square features an installation by Mary Fuller (sculptor) and Robert McChesney called Tot Lot. The collection of sculptures are made of concrete and glass and overall encompass approximately 7 ft 2 in (2.18 m) × 30 ft 7 in (9.32 m) × 25 ft 9 in (7.85 m). Completed in 1983 and dedicated in 1984, the sculptures are used as playground equipment such as a slide and a sandbox. It consists of six animals from the Chinese zodiac: a Goat, a Tiger, a Monkey, a Rabbit, a Dragon and a Snake. All of the animals have glass eyes and are abstract in design.

Tot Lot was commissioned by the city and county of San Francisco's Bureau of Architecture and two of the pieces, the ram and rabbit, were gifts of the Tamarack Foundation. The architect's office, Recreation and Parks Department and San Francisco Arts Commission developed the piece. Children use the pieces frequently due to its playground status. In 1994 it was surveyed as part of the Smithsonian Institution's Save Outdoor Sculpture! program in 1994 and was described as needing conservation treatment.

== In media ==
Director Don Siegel filmed a scene from the 1971 movie Dirty Harry in the Square. As the character "Dirty Harry" follows "Scorpio", it is possible to see the stone bridge joining the park to the Chinese Culture Center of San Francisco, at 750 Kearny Street.
