= 32nd anniversary of the 1989 Tiananmen Square protests and massacre =

32nd anniversary of Tiananmen Square protests of 1989
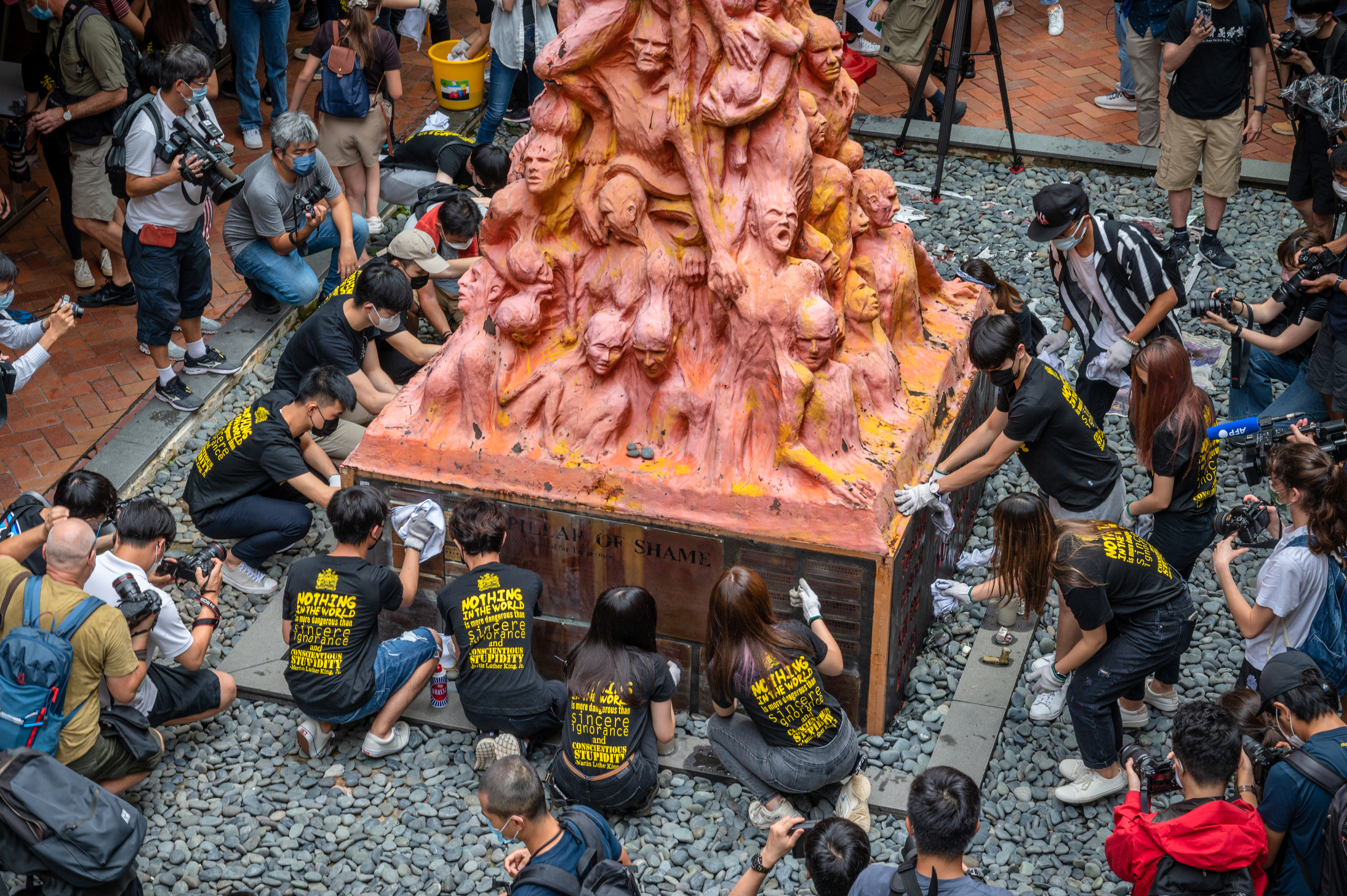
- Students preparing the Pillar of Shame for the 32nd anniversary at the University of Hong Kong
- Date: 4 June 2021
- Location: Hong Kong Macau Taiwan Several countries
- Outcome: Protest march, candlelight vigil, dispersal of Hong Kong vigils

The 32nd anniversary of the 1989 Tiananmen Square protests featured events in China and elsewhere on, and leading up to, 4 June 2021 – to commemorate the 1989 Tiananmen Square protests and massacre, in which the government of China ordered the army to fire on protestors, killing hundreds, if not thousands, of people.

The anniversary commemoration in 2021 in Hong Kong did not take place because the government banned it for the second year in a row under the pretext of COVID-19 pandemic restrictions. Amid a huge police presence across the territory, the traditional venue of Victoria Park remained empty for the first time in 32 years. The anniversary occurred in the wake of the national security legislation for Hong Kong enacted by Beijing's National People's Congress in May 2020. Pro-Beijing politicians warned that certain slogans habitually chanted by attendees on previous occasions, such as "end one-party rule", may violate the national security legislation, although legal experts have said that gatherings and mournings alone would not breach the law.

== The ban ==
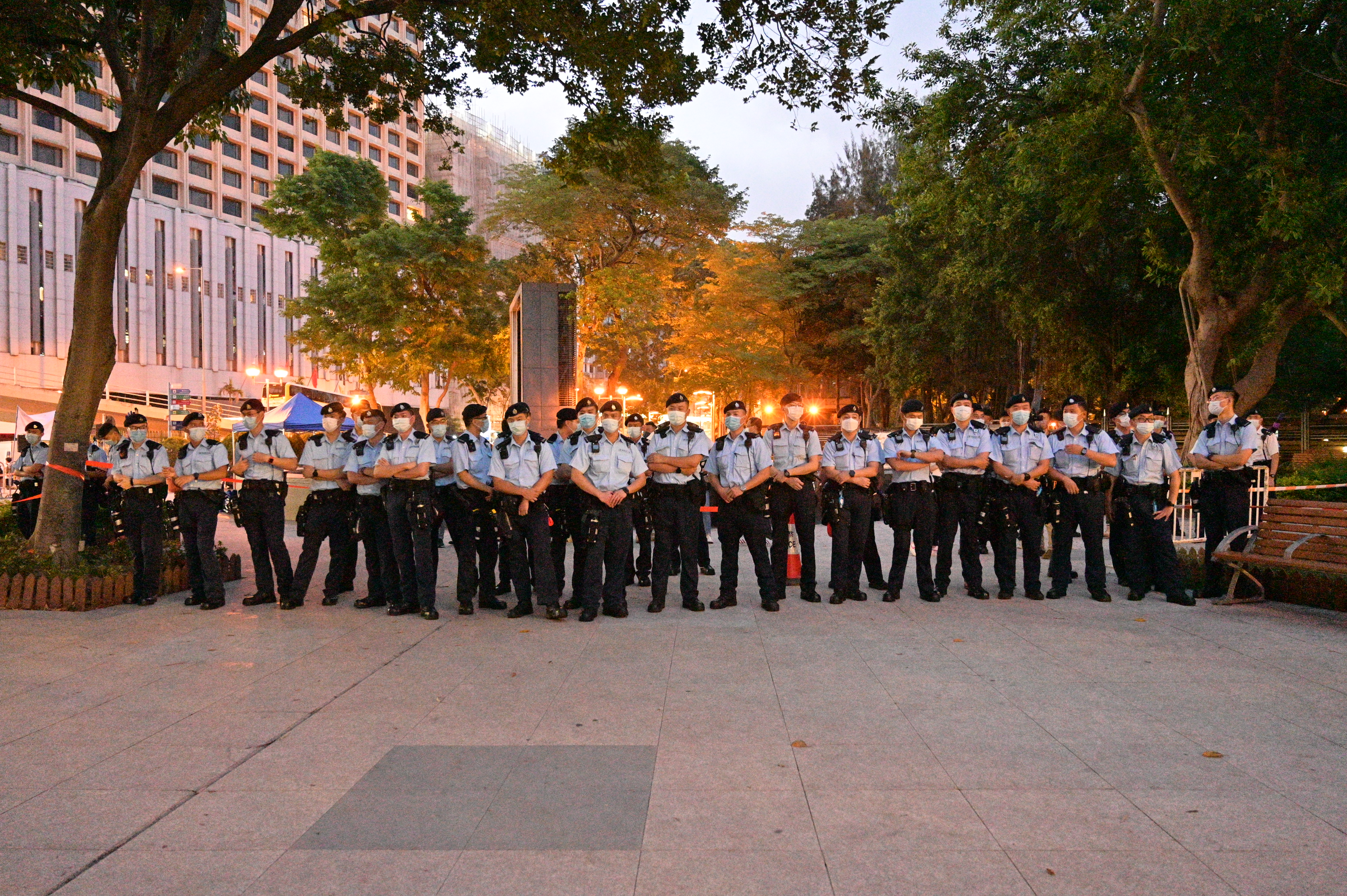
Police cordon outside Victoria Park, Hong Kong

For the past 30 years, 4 June has been a grand occasion in Hong Kong as one of very few places on Chinese soil permitting memorials for the 1989 Tiananmen Square protests; vigils were typically attended by tens of thousands of Hongkongers. In 2020, the Hong Kong government invoked a Prevention and Control of Disease Ordinance, imposing a four-person limit for public gatherings. Many observers believe that the COVID-19 pandemic provided cover for an increase in arrests related to the protests. A ban under similar pretenses also occurred in Macau, another region on Chinese soil that had previously hosted public memorials, and continued in 2021, openly citing political grounds.

On 28 April 2021, a Hong Kong government spokesperson announced that the annual commemoration in Victoria Park would again be banned due to COVID-19 restrictions. Yet the previous six weeks had seen no locally transmitted cases. On 27 May, organisers received an official letter from the police objecting to the Friday 4 June vigil and to a 30 May street march.

Organisers pointed out that other public events, such as a flower fair and Art Basel in the previous weeks, had received authorisation. Hong Kong's chief executive, Carrie Lam, deferred to the decision as a law-enforcement issue that had withstood legal challenge, refusing to elaborate on the double standard. She had previously said that it was important to show respect to the Chinese Communist Party. Pro-Beijing lawmaker and lawyer Paul Tse believes the government should be honest with the public, that the vigil was banned not only because of the pandemic as has been claimed, but because of national security concerns.

The government showed its determination to stop any memorial when the Security Bureau warned on 29 May that the penalty for attending an unlawful assembly was five years in prison under the Public Order Ordinance, or one year for promoting it.

The Hong Kong Alliance in Support of Patriotic Democratic Movements of China (The Alliance) – organisers of the traditional memorial in Victoria Park – abided by the government's ban, urging the public to commemorate lawfully and safely. But the government decided to use brute force to deter the public from attending. Police sources said that more than a fifth of the force's strength (up to 7,000 officers) would be deployed across Hong Kong on Friday, to handle potential gatherings in memory of victims. Victoria Park alone would be guarded by 3,000 officers, and parts of the park could be sealed off "in accordance with the Public Order Ordinance". According to the police, members of the public, particularly those dressed in black, going near Victoria Park could be considered to be taking part in an illegal assembly if they chant slogans or light candles.

== Mainland China ==
As has become habitual, mainland authorities suppressed all discussion of the events inside China. The few remaining activists and victims’ advocates were put under increased police monitoring, forced to take "vacations" around the time of the anniversary, or both.

On the eve of the 32nd anniversary, the Foreign Ministry reiterated that China's suppression of the "political turmoil" of 1989 had been correct. Tiananmen Mothers, 62 of whose members have died since 1989, decried the fact that younger Chinese had "grown up in a false sense of prosperous jubilance and enforced glorification of the government (and) have no idea of, or refuse to believe, what happened on 4 June 1989, in the nation's capital".

== Hong Kong ==
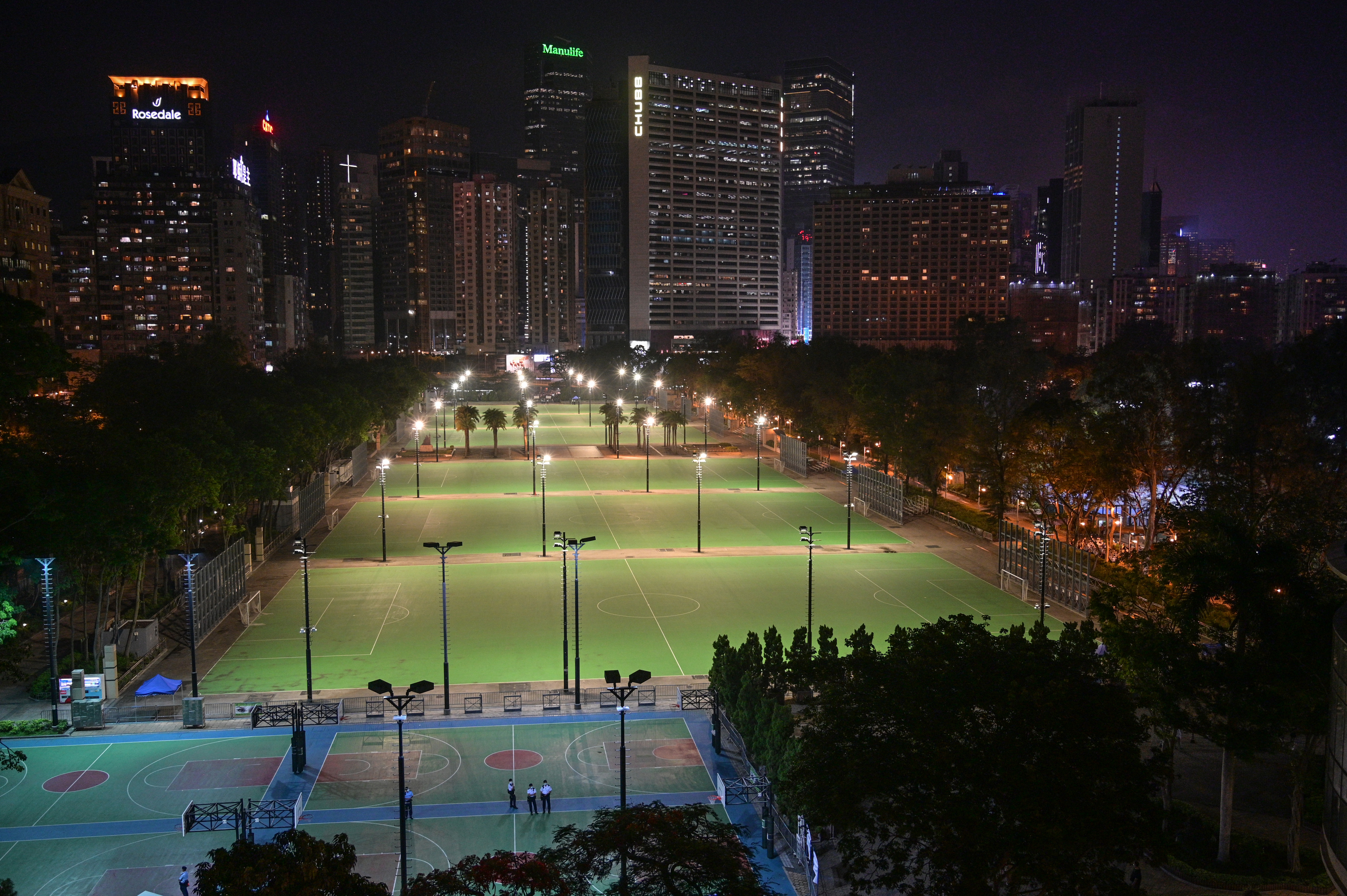
A usually brimming Victoria Park, Hong Kong, on the night of 4 June 2021

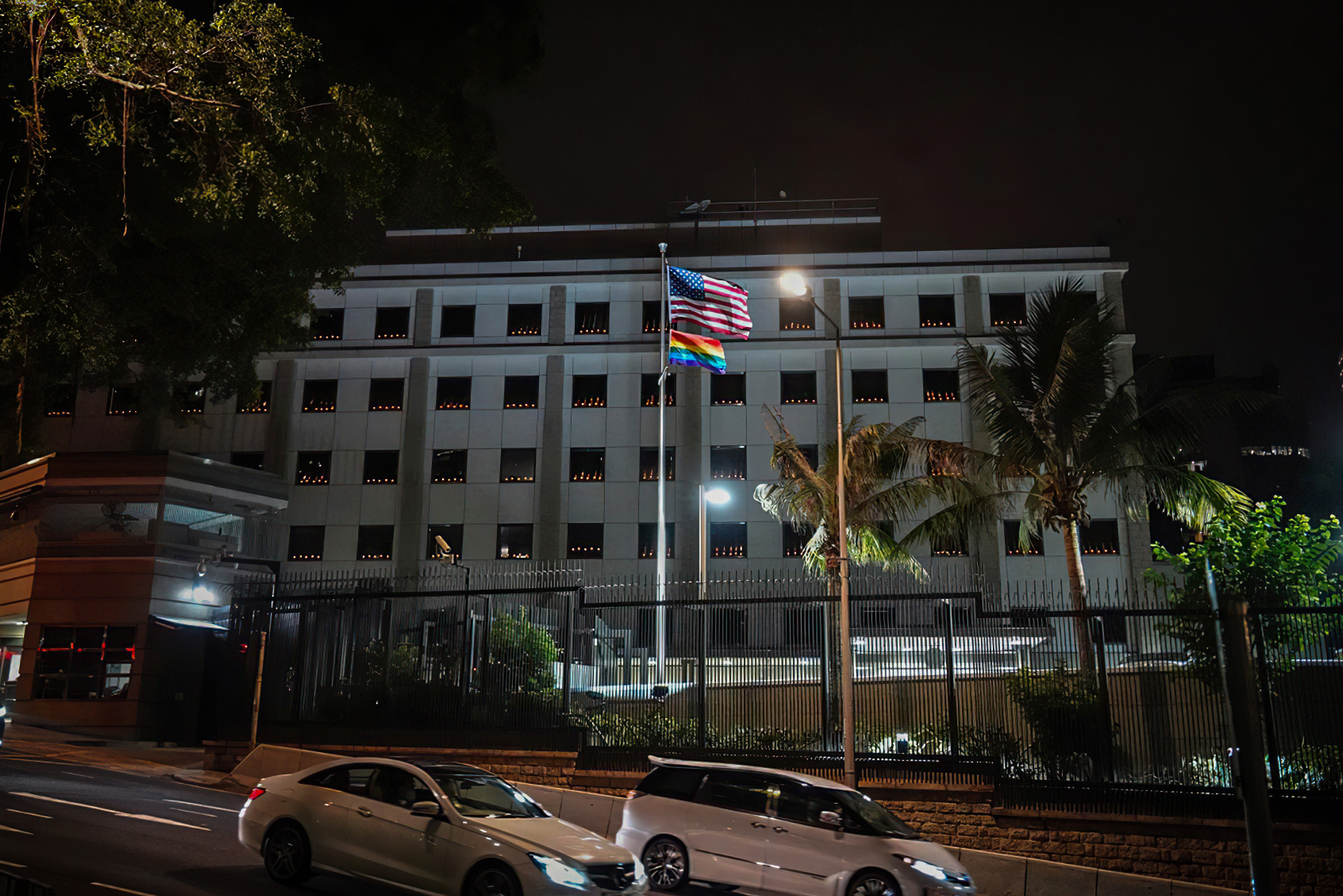
A candle-lit US Consulate, Hong Kong, on the night of 4 June 2021

Among arrests of 24 prominent democracy activists relating to the 2020 memorials, Joshua Wong received a 10-month prison sentence in May for participating in the vigil, and three others were sentenced to four to six months. As of 5 June 2021, twenty more activists were to be arraigned on 11 June on similar charges.

The police were out in force, stopping and searching civilians in the vicinity of Victoria Park and elsewhere. Just before the evening rush hour, police mounted road blocks on the island-bound carriageways of the harbour crossings.

=== Events ===
As the traditional memorial had not been allowed, activists urged the public to commemorate the event creatively and individually where necessary. Lee Cheuk-yan, Chairman of the Alliance, wrote a Facebook message from his jail cell on the eve of the anniversary expressing the hope that "everyone can find your own way to light a candle by the window, on the road, wherever that can be seen by others, to continue our mourning”. Chow Hang-tung, vice-chairman of the Alliance, stated on social media that she planned to go to Victoria Park in a personal capacity to light a candle for the victims.

Artist Kacey Wong, who has amassed a collection of hundreds of spent candles from previous vigils, planned to redistribute them to the people of Hong Kong so they can preserve them and perpetuate the memory of those who perished.

The United States Consulate in Hong Kong placed 400 electronic candles on its window sills in memory of the victims of the massacre in 1989. The European Union mission in Hong Kong likewise placed candles on its windows, drawing an angry response from China: "Any attempt to exploit Hong Kong to carry out infiltration or sabotage activities against the mainland crosses the red line ... is absolutely intolerable".

Members of the public headed for churches, which reported reaching full capacity. Others took to the street near Victoria Park and in many other districts with candles or with the lights on their mobile phones lit up while police attempted to disperse them.

=== Incidents ===
Days before the anniversary, journalists at RTHK, Hong Kong's public broadcaster, were informed by their management that no political stories would be allowed on air.

Under rules put in place since the arrival of a new government-appointed director, programming at RTHK has cut back or cancelled at least 10 programmes – including a segment about the Tiananmen anniversary that had aired the week before – and deleted entire online archives. RTHK management said three episodes of Hong Kong Connection, Hong Kong Stories, and LegCo Review "were not impartial, unbiased, [or] accurate". A government spokesman said: "According to the charter, RTHK is editorially independent and is immune from commercial, political, and/or other influences. The producers' guidelines stipulate that 'there can never be editorial autonomy without responsibility, freedom without restraint'," a spokesperson said.

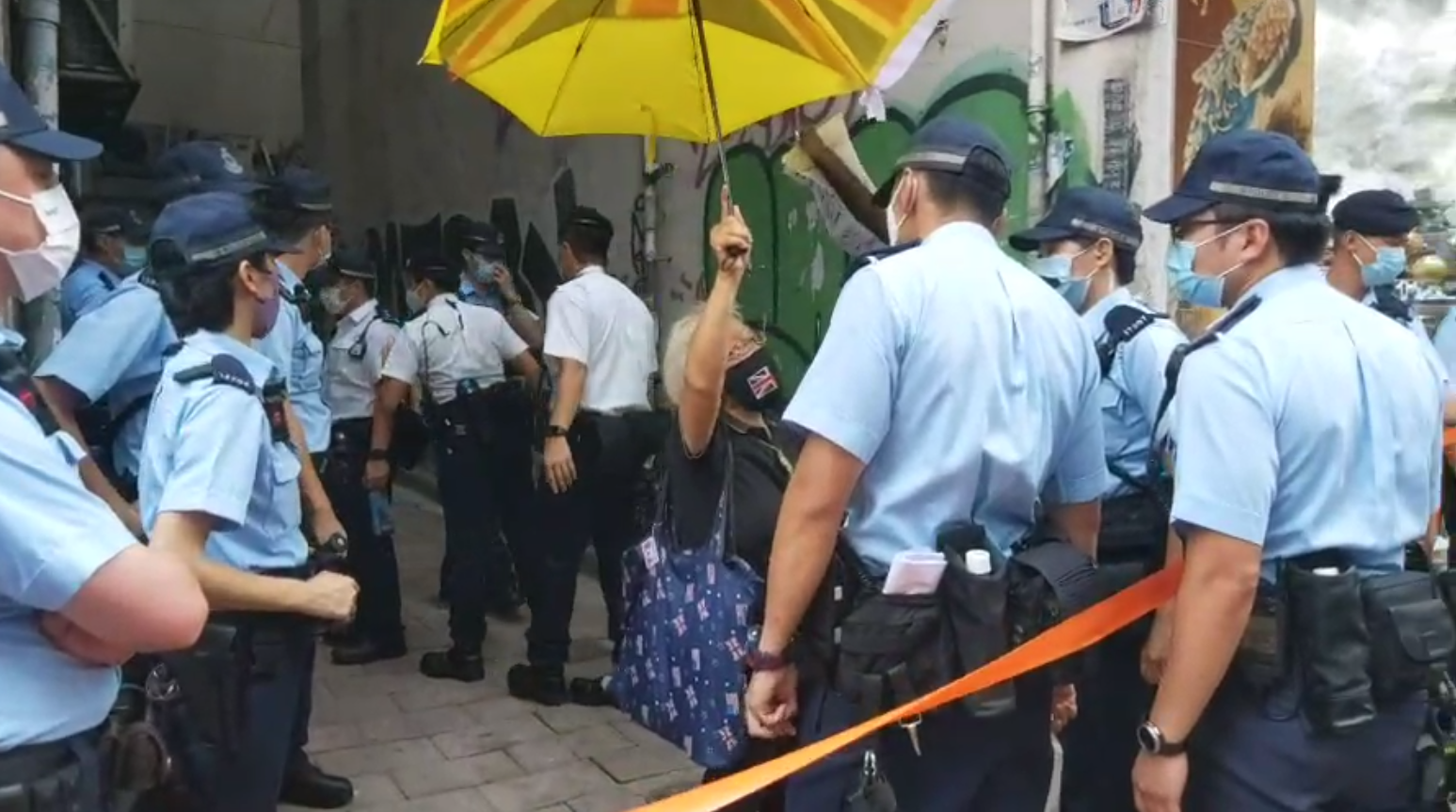
Alexandra Wong surrounded by police prior to her arrest

On 30 May 2021, a 65-year-old pro-democracy activist, Alexandra Wong, nicknamed "Grandma Wong", was arrested while marching alone on the eve of the anniversary of the 1989 Tiananmen Square massacre. She was arrested for allegedly "attempting to incite others to participate in an unauthorised assembly" and "knowingly taking part in an unauthorised assembly". She was held overnight and was released the next day without being charged; police said they reserved the right to pursue her at a later stage.

The press reported that a street-stand run by the Alliance in Kwai Chung received particular attention from police officers on 29 May while activists were distributing pamphlets and electronic candles. Police alleged that the booth was "surrounded by people", and fined a woman and the organisers for violating the four-person social gathering restrictions. A street booth run by the League of Social Democrats in Causeway Bay the same weekend was allegedly attacked by political opponents.

On 1 June, the Food and Health Department forced the closure of the June 4th Museum, run and curated by the Alliance, organisers of the traditional vigil. It raided the premises and initiated proceedings alleging that the museum had violated the Places of Public Entertainment Ordinance by operating without a licence.

On the morning of 4 June, barrister Chow Hang-tung, who co-chairs the Alliance, was arrested after she posted on social media urging people to commemorate the event privately by lighting a candle wherever they were. She was released the next day on HK$10,000 bail, with the requirement to report to the police in a month's time. She said that the police made an "unjust and preventive arrest ... obviously aimed at stopping me from physically going to Victoria Park and frightening other people from doing the same or even approaching Causeway Bay".

== United Kingdom ==
Six former foreign secretaries – Malcolm Rifkind, Margaret Beckett, William Hague, Jack Straw, David Miliband, and David Owen – wrote an open letter urging prime minister Boris Johnson to recognise the need for the United Kingdom's leadership in light of the deteriorating human rights situation in Hong Kong, and to "ensure that the crisis in Hong Kong is on the agenda" at the G7 leaders' summit in Cornwall.

A coalition of Tibetan, Uyghur, and Hong Kong groups organised a demonstration at the Chinese embassy in London to commemorate the massacre on 4 June. Among the thousand-strong gathering was exiled Hong Kong legislator Nathan Law, who addressed the crowd. Another memorial took place earlier in the afternoon at Leicester Square in the West End. Benedict Rogers of Hong Kong Watch attended and gave a speech. He joined in chanting the slogan "Liberate Hong Kong, revolution of our times". About a hundred people took part in an early-evening rally in Piccadilly Gardens in Manchester.

== North America ==
Hundreds, including Alex Chow, former student leader of the Umbrella Movement, attended a vigil in New York's Washington Square Park in New York. "Liberate Hong Kong" banners were seen.

Activists organised a candlelit vigil outside the Chinese embassy in Vancouver, British Columbia. Award-winning filmmaker Jevons Au attended.

== Australia ==
Former legislative councilor Ted Hui led a vigil with dozens of people in Adelaide for Hong Kong's pro-democracy movement and for the victims of the 1989 suppression of the Tiananmen protest movement.

== Taiwan ==
A memorial site was set up at Liberty Square in Taipei. Attendees included Hong Kong bookseller Lam Wing-kee, who was disappeared in 2015.

A vigil organised by a coalition of 30 NGOs and civil society groups in Taiwan created a light display that read "8964 32" in Taipei's Liberty Square.

== Japan ==
A group of activists lined up outside Shinjuku station in Tokyo and waved flags adorned with the slogan "Liberate Hong Kong, revolution of our times".

== Online ==
=== Events ===
Taiwan-based New School for Democracy organised a two-hour Chinese-language memorial that livestreamed on Facebook and YouTube. Speakers included former Tiananmen student leaders Wu'erkaixi and Zhou Fengsuo, exiled artist Badiucao, and former Hong Kong legislator Nathan Law.

A 24-hour Zoom vigil was scheduled, in addition to virtual events on Clubhouse.

=== Incidents ===
==== Website takedowns ====
2021HKCharter.com, a website promoting a democratic charter for Hong Kong set up by exiled activist Nathan Law, was taken down on 31 May by its host Wix.com. The company said it had responded to a notification from the Hong Kong Police who said that it was "likely to constitute offences endangering national security", and that failure to do so could result in a fine and six months in prison. Saying that the removal was "a mistake", Wix reinstated the site several days later following public disclosure.

The website of Hong Kong Liberation Coalition, a US-based advocacy group for democracy in Hong Kong co-founded by Baggio Leung, was reportedly taken down by WordPress, its web host, which informed them that their website had been suspended and would not be reinstated. Leung suggested that it may have been the result of a request from Hong Kong police under the national security law. But WordPress denied external influence, and alleged a violation of their terms of service, adding that they would help the site owner find a different host.

==== Absence of Tank Man from Bing searches ====
Microsoft Bing was caught up in censorship controversy after Google analyst Shane Huntley found no search results for Tank Man when using the engine, affecting users around the world. Other search engines that rely on Microsoft were also affected, particularly for image searches. Bing, which has a significant percentage of employees based in China, attributed the problem to "human error".

The search term was globally blocked "by accident" on Bing on 6 June, but was restored to users outside China the next day.

== Aftermath ==
In January 2022, Chow Hang-tung was sentenced to 15 months for having called for the vigil. Ten months of the sentence were to be served consecutively with a sentence in relation to the 2020 vigil, meaning that Chow was to serve 22 months in prison in total for her role in the 2020 and 2021 vigils. This came the month after the dismantling of memorials to the massacre, including the Pillar of Shame at Hong Kong University, a replica of the Goddess of Democracy that had been at the Chinese University of Hong Kong (CUHK), and a relief sculpture at Lingnan University.

The CCP continued its crackdown on the next anniversary. Victoria Park's soccer pitches were booked most of the day, accompanying heavy police presence there and at Causeway Bay. Police stopped and searched those suspected to be "inciting" protests. Catholic churches in Hong Kong cancelled the Mass for the Tiananmen victims for the first time because the diocese held concerns about violating the national security law. Cardinal Joseph Zen had been arrested the month before. Combined with the disbanding of the Alliance in September 2021, the large public vigils of years past did not happen. Despite continued suppression, Hongkongers went to Victoria Park after the cordon lifted to place candles and light torches on their phones. Six were arrested: Yu Wai-pan, Chan Po-ying, Dickson Chau Ka-Faat, Lau San-ching, and two other members of the League of Social Democrats (LSD) party. To circumvent the ban on unauthorised gatherings, students at CUHK covertly carried miniature Goddesses of Democracy and had also hidden the miniatures around campus until fear of surveillance stopped them.

In Macau, 2022 marked the first year that organisers made no effort to hold public events. The Union for Democracy Development (UMDD) had organised vigils at Senado Square, as well as photographic exhibitions, but authorities denied requests to do so in 2020 and 2021. Activists mourned the erosion of the freedom of assembly and instead commemorated the anniversary privately and online. That continued on the 2023 anniversary. Earlier that year, the UMDD had disbanded in response to the tightening of Macau's security laws, bringing an indefinite end to public commemorations there.

Even those not making political statements, even obliquely, were caught up in the crackdown: Internet celebrity Li Jiaqi's profile was removed from online shopping platform Taobao after a tank-shaped cake appeared in a livestream as he was selling snacks on 3 June 2022, the night before the anniversary. Censors cut off the stream and erased images of the cake and any conversations alluding to it. He also failed to show for subsequent livestreams until he returned without explanation on 20 September.

The ban makes Taiwan the only place in the Chinese-speaking world that can host public vigils and commemorations. Taiwanese activists received the events ambivalently. Many expressed solidarity in the fight for democracy and against oppression, while others felt that the anniversary did not concern them and risked escalating tensions between Taiwan and the Mainland.

Also for the first time, the Chinese foreign ministry office told consulates to remain silent on the event. Despite this, the U.S., Australia, Poland, and other consulates posted messages for the memorial on social media and issued official public statements on the anniversary.

Vigils and memorials continued to occur in other countries around the world, such as in Australia, the UK, and the U.S.
