= 31st anniversary of the 1989 Tiananmen Square protests and massacre =

31st anniversary of Tiananmen Square protests of 1989
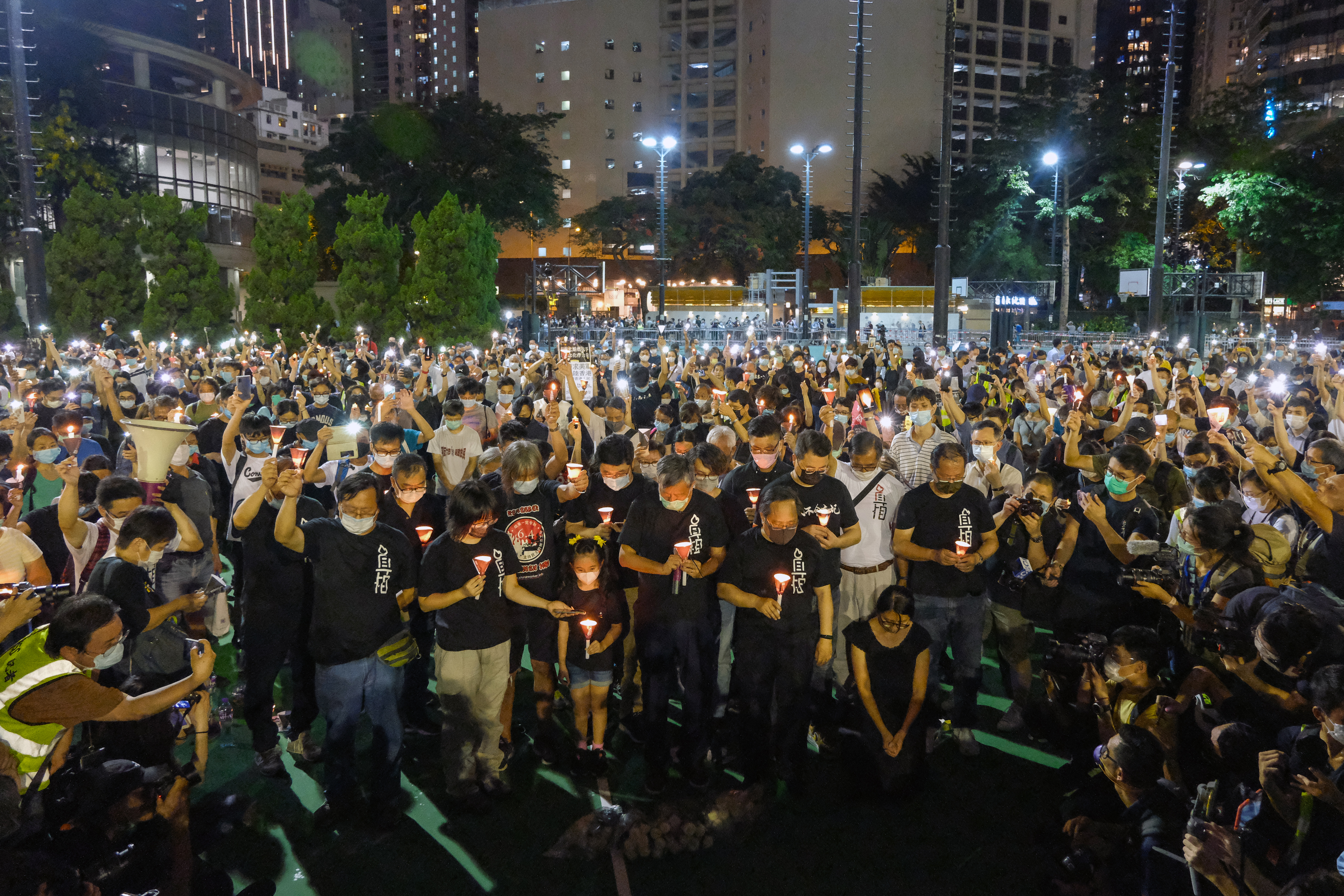
- Date: 4 June 2020
- Location: Hong Kong Macau Taiwan
- Participants: General public
- Outcome: Protest march, candlelight vigil

The 31st anniversary of Tiananmen Square protests of 1989 was principally events that occurred in China and elsewhere on and leading up to 4 June 2020 – to commemorate the 1989 Tiananmen Square protests and massacre, in which hundreds if not thousands of people were killed.

The anniversary in Hong Kong took place despite a ban by the government under pretext of restrictions owing to the COVID-19 pandemic; future anniversaries are under threat of national security legislation for Hong Kong enacted by the National People's Congress in Beijing in May 2020, but it is claimed by law experts that gatherings and mournings alone would not constitute a breach of the law.

It was reported that, all in all, despite the ban, tens of thousands of Hong Kong people still came out in defiance of the ban, knocking down barricades erected around Victoria Park.

== Background ==
Since 1989, Hong Kong has been the only place on Chinese soil where the Tiananmen Square massacre is publicly commemorated. The 31st anniversary is set against the world-wide COVID-19 pandemic and intense political conflict and civil unrest since June 2019. Furthermore, the National People's Congress voted to impose a national security law on Hong Kong which would outlaw subversion and has cemented fears that the concept of "one country, two systems" – which buffers Hong Kong from mainland China – was being seriously undermined. Pro-establishment member of the Basic Law Committee, Maria Tam, warned participants at future rallies that it would be wise to leave any demonstration if they heard others shouting slogans opposing “one-party dictatorship”.

In 2020, the Hong Kong government invoked Prevention and Control of Disease Ordinance, imposing a 4-person limit for public gatherings, and many observers believe that the coronavirus pandemic provided cover for an increase of arrests related to the protests.

== Online ==
A US-based NGO led by Zhou Fengsuo, former student leader of the Tiananmen protests, hosted a 3-hour online commemoration on 31 May which was attended by 250 participants. The event had to be kept under wraps until the last minute due to the reuniting of many high-profile figures with direct ties to the pro-democracy movement. Tiananmen Mothers had been invited to address the meeting.

On 7 June the organisation's paid Zoom account was shut down. No reply was forthcoming despite repeated email requests for an explanation. Zoom Video Communications issued a press statement confirming that the account had been shut, citing the need "to comply with local law", but said it had since been re-activated.

== Mainland China ==
Tiananmen Square in Beijing was reportedly empty and quiet on the day. Pedestrians' identification documents were checked at security checkpoints upon entry to the square, and nationwide mass surveillance was tightened to prevent any commemoration of the event. Human rights groups reported that, as in recent years, dissidents had been sent away or placed under house arrest and their communications cut off.

== Hong Kong ==
=== Events prior to the anniversary ===
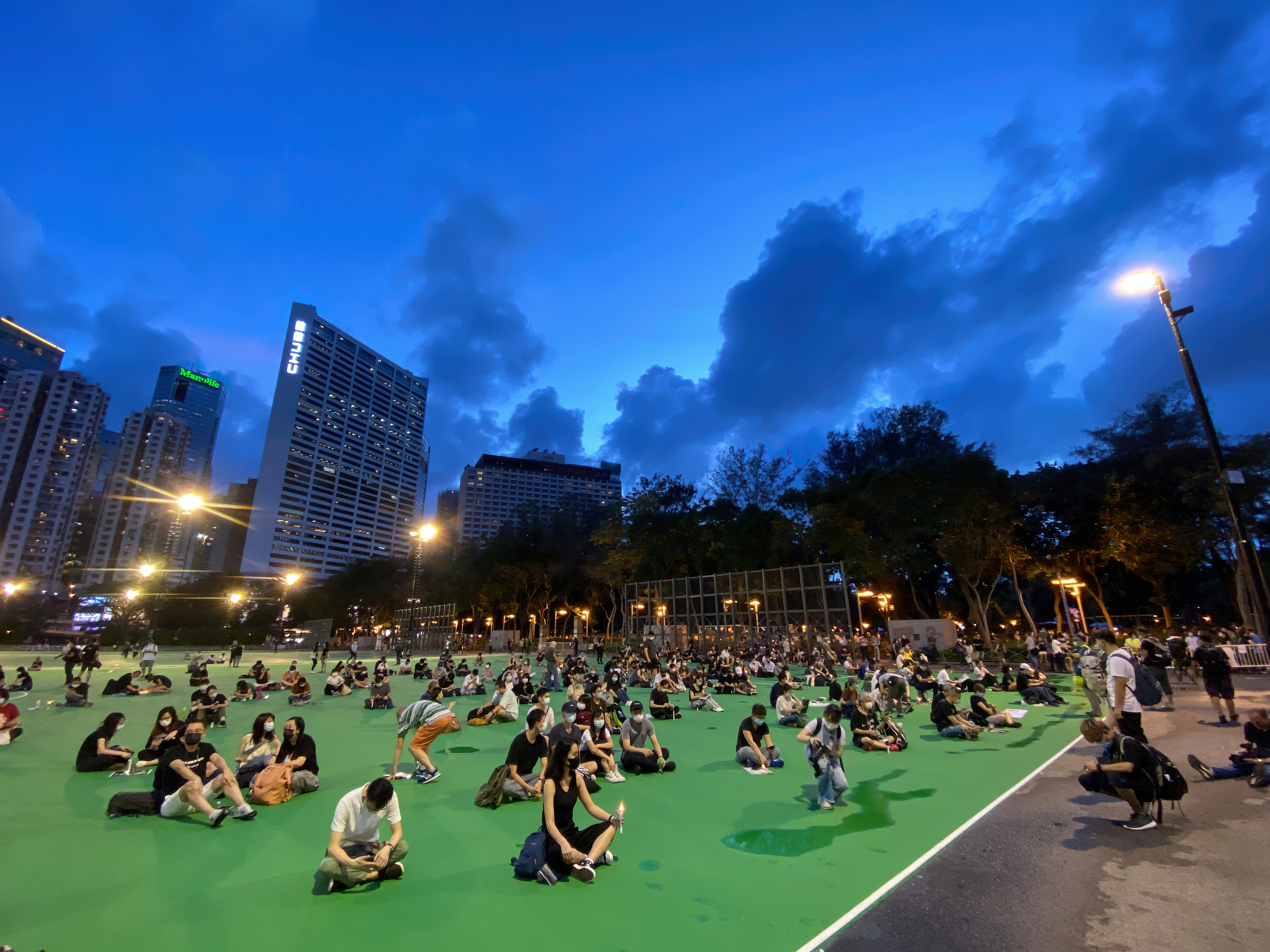
A socially distanced group of individuals awaiting the start of the memorial in Victoria Park

Following the emergence of three cases of local transmission, the government extended its coronavirus social distancing measures by 14 days, to 4 June, affecting the annual vigil in Victoria Park. The government denied suggestions that the extension was aimed at interfering with the commemoration, saying the decision was made in accordance with its extension policy. Whilst announcing that it would relax restrictions on religious gatherings and that high school students would restart school the next Wednesday (3 June), the Hong Kong government decreed that public gatherings of more than eight people would remain prohibited.

Concerned that the vigil would not be permitted, Lee Cheuk-yan, chairman of the Hong Kong Alliance in Support of Patriotic Democratic Movements of China (the Alliance) which organises the annual vigil pointed to the contradiction between a possible ban and a relaxation of health measures. He accused the government of political interference. He invited Hongkongers to "blossom everywhere" and turn the vigil into a tribute across the entire city. Finally, the police issued a letter of objection to the organisers, citing health restrictions on gatherings of more than eight people. The Alliance announced that, in the absence of an official vigil, 60 booths would be set up across the city on 4 June to distribute candles starting in the afternoon. Lee said that members would still be allowed to enter Victoria Park that night, but called on the public to light candles across the city and join an online gathering.

In response to the government ban, the memorial activities became more diffuse throughout Hong Kong. The Alliance organised a long-distance running event on the preceding Sunday starting at 8.45 am, with Victoria Park as the end point; participants ran in groups of eight. Literary groups PEN Hong Kong and Cha: An Asian Literary Journal held English-language book readings on 3 June "To honour the struggle of the democracy protesters, mourn their defeat, and take stock of the last three decades and more"; citizens organised commemorations of the massacre in districts throughout Hong Kong. Church services were planned for the day across the city.

After issuing a letter of objection to the organisers, the police announced that some 3,000 riot police would be deployed to enforce the ban. Police warned that even if participants split into smaller groups, they would still be in breach of the law.

=== Anniversary ===
Notwithstanding the recent police warning, tens of thousands gathered at Victoria Park to attend the vigil, afraid that time was running out on the anniversary in Hong Kong. Local media reported the presence of over 3,000 riot police throughout the city. In various districts across Hong Kong, thousands remembered the events of 1989. There were significant crowds in Kwun Tong and Mong Kok. At Victoria Park, people who started to convene were warned by loudspeakers of prosecution. While no violence was reported in or around Victoria Park, scuffles were reported in Mong Kok where hundreds had gathered. As part of the continuing civil unrest, protesters who blocked roads with various objects were met with police officers who used pepper spray to disperse them. Security was tight around the Liaison Office, and activists were blocked from the site.

On the day of the anniversary, the Legislative Council of Hong Kong passed a bill to outlaw the insulting of the Chinese national anthem, where those convicted of intentionally abusing it could face up to three years in prison and a fine of HK$50,000 ($6,450). The bill was supported by 41 lawmakers, all from pro-Beijing factions, and just one legislator opposed. Most of the pro-democracy lawmakers boycotted the vote in protest.

=== Aftermath ===
Lee Cheuk-yan, Albert Ho and Jimmy Lai were later told by the police to expect a court summons for incitement to illegal assembly on 4 June. Lee stated in response that "police are abusing their power to arrest, the Department of Justice is abusing its power to prosecute and trying to [intimidate] the people of Hong Kong when they exercise our right to assembly”.

A group of 26 activists were charged on 6 August for taking part in the vigil marking the anniversary with “knowingly taking part in an unauthorised assembly”. Joshua Wong pled guilty and was sentenced to 10 months. Lester Shum, Jannelle Leung and Tiffany Yuen were sentenced to terms of between four and six months. 12 others, including former Legislative Council members, were jailed for between 4 and 18 months. The last eight others, including Jimmy Lai, were jailed for between 4 and 14 months.

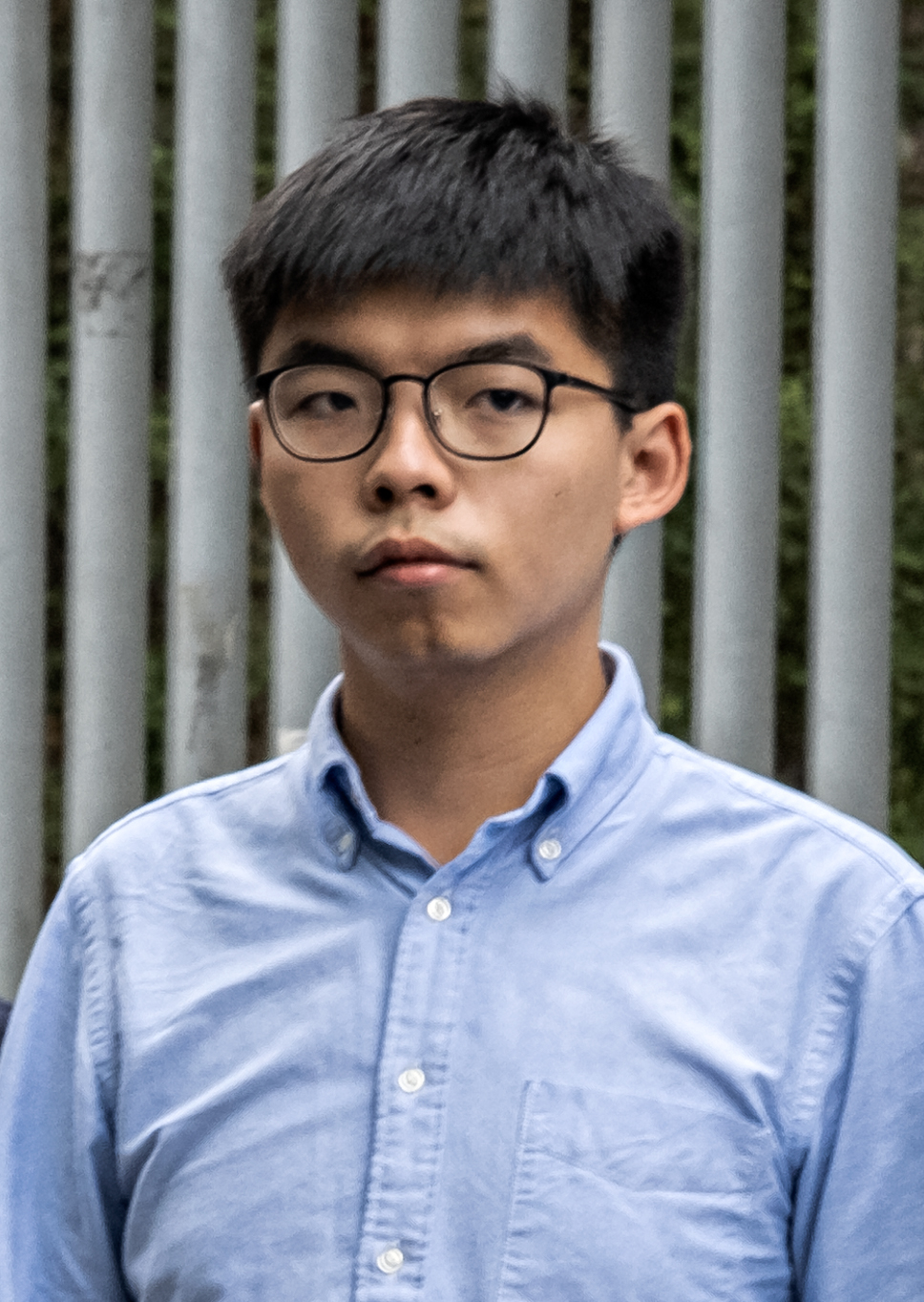
Joshua Wong
jailed for 10 months

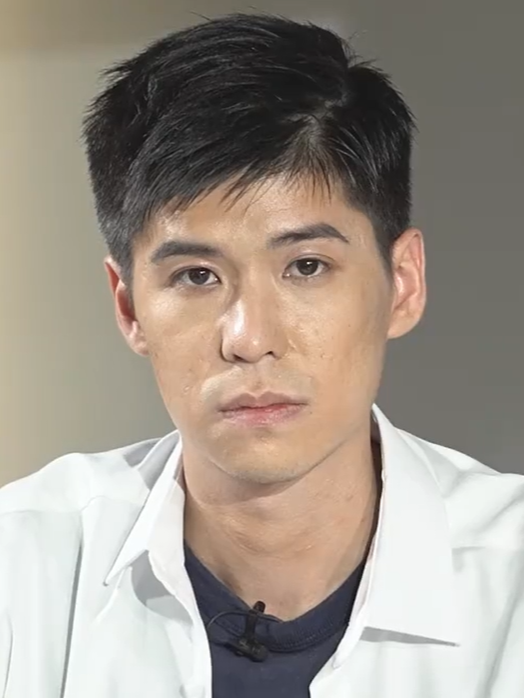
Lester Shum
jailed for 6 months

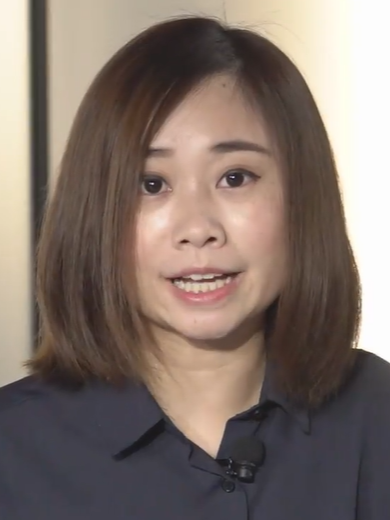
Tiffany Yuen
jailed for 4 months

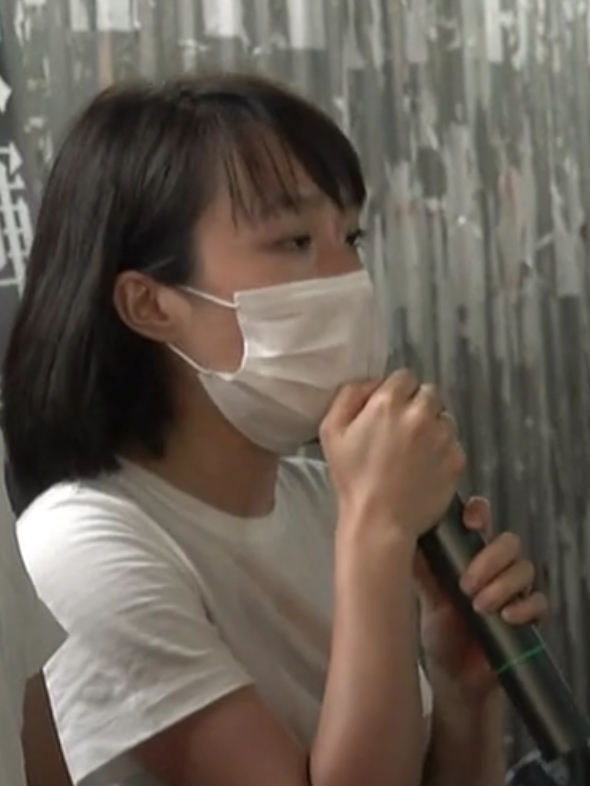
Jannelle Leung
jailed for 4 months

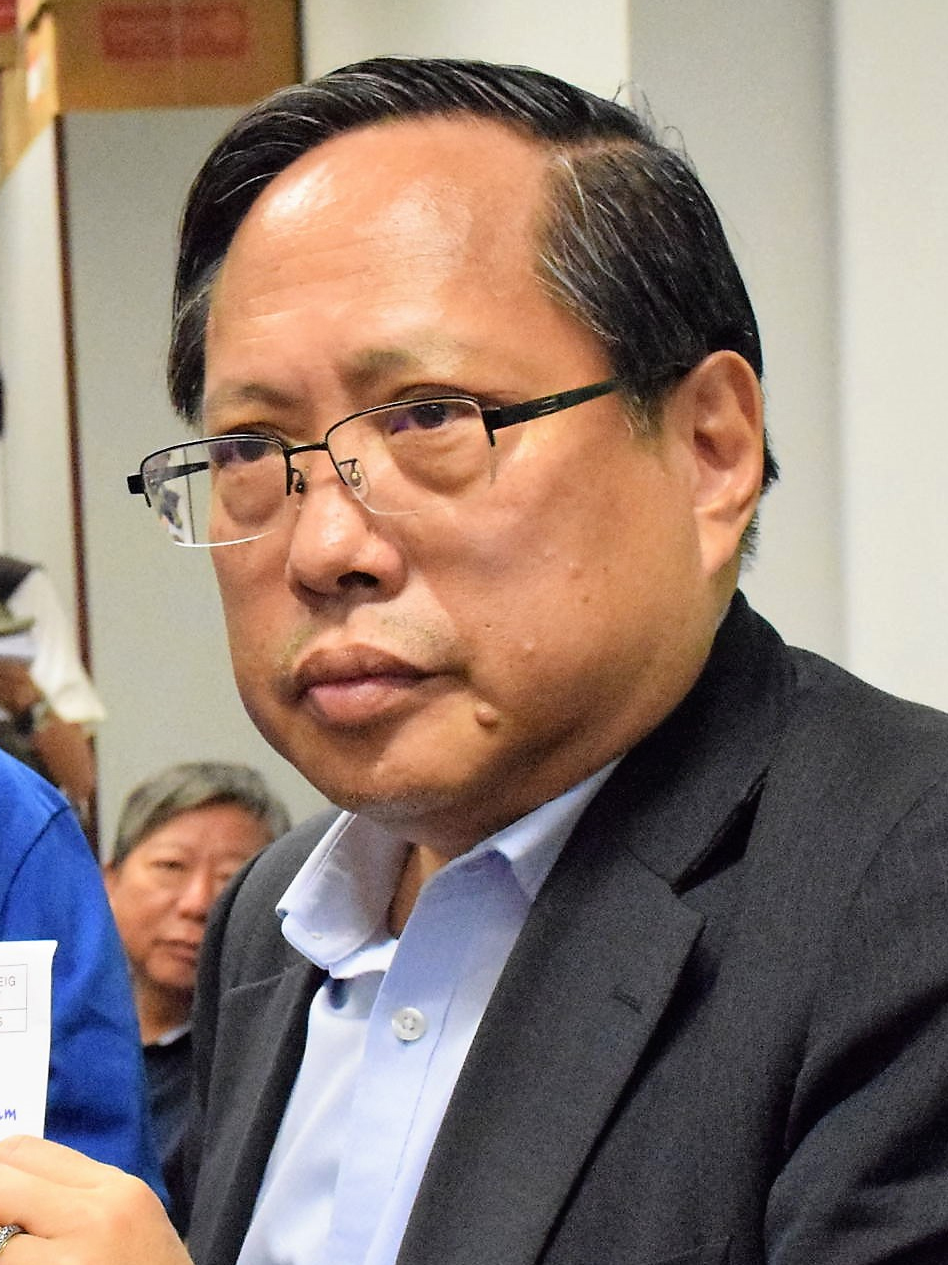
Albert Ho
jailed for 10 months, served concurrently

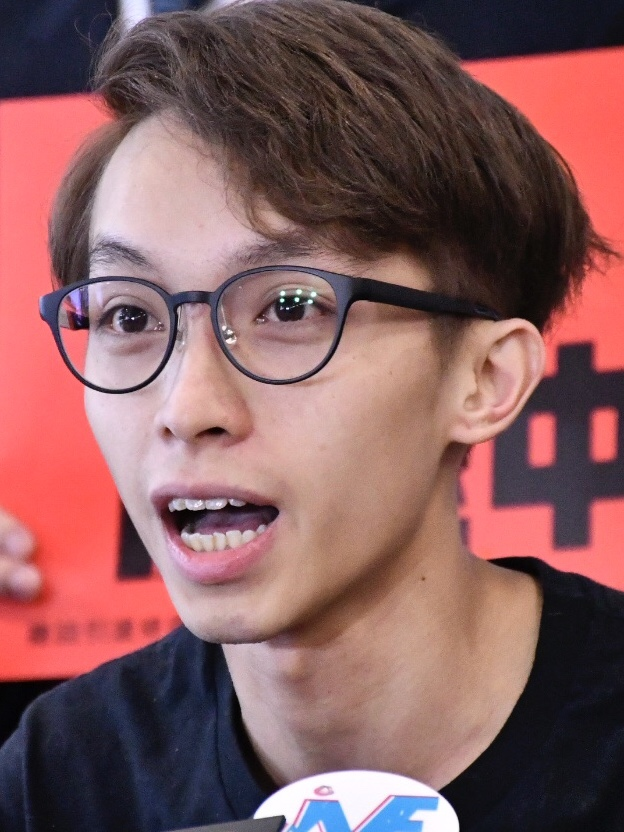
Figo Chan
jailed for 10 months, served concurrently

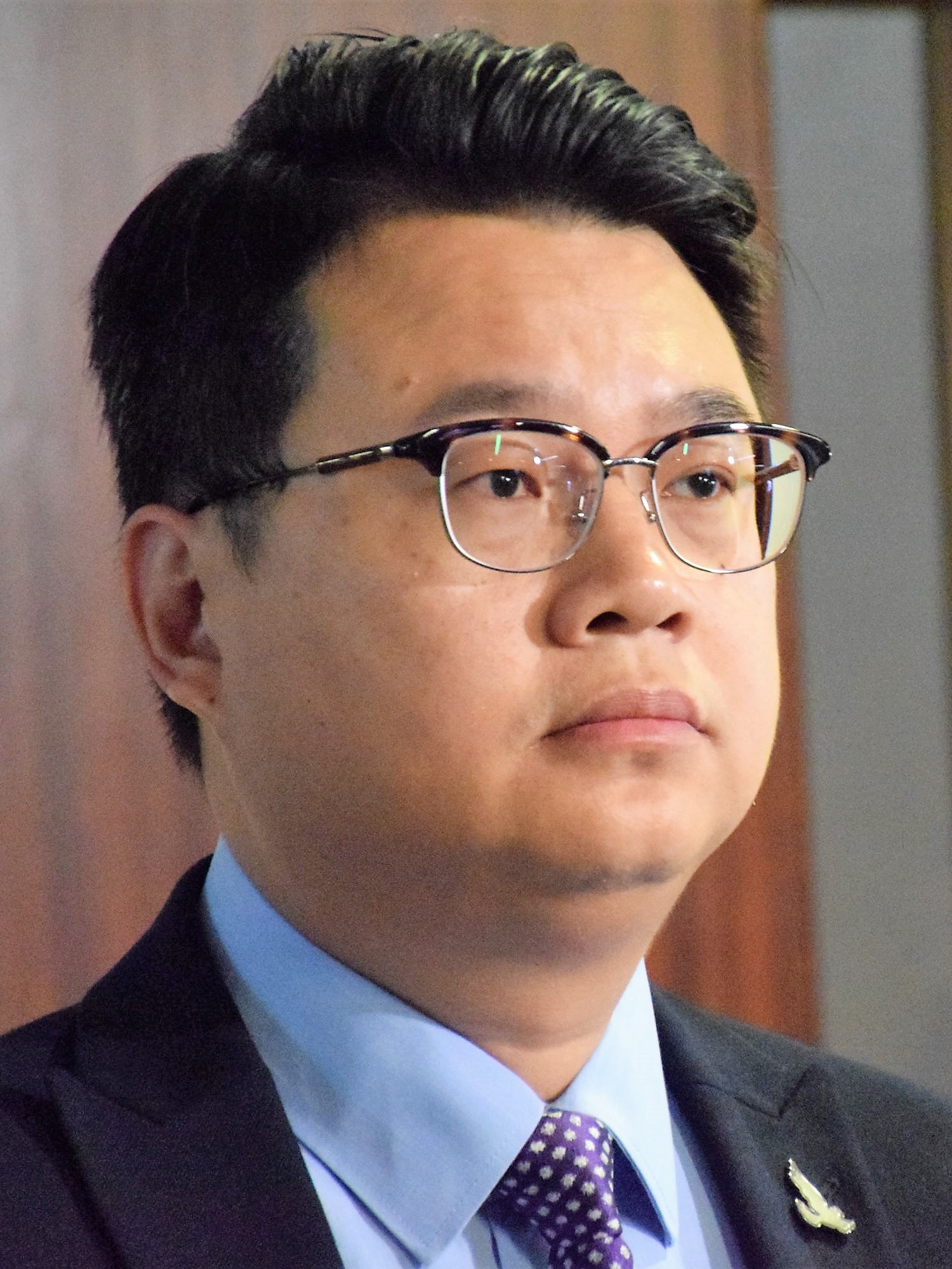
Andrew Wan
jailed for 10 months

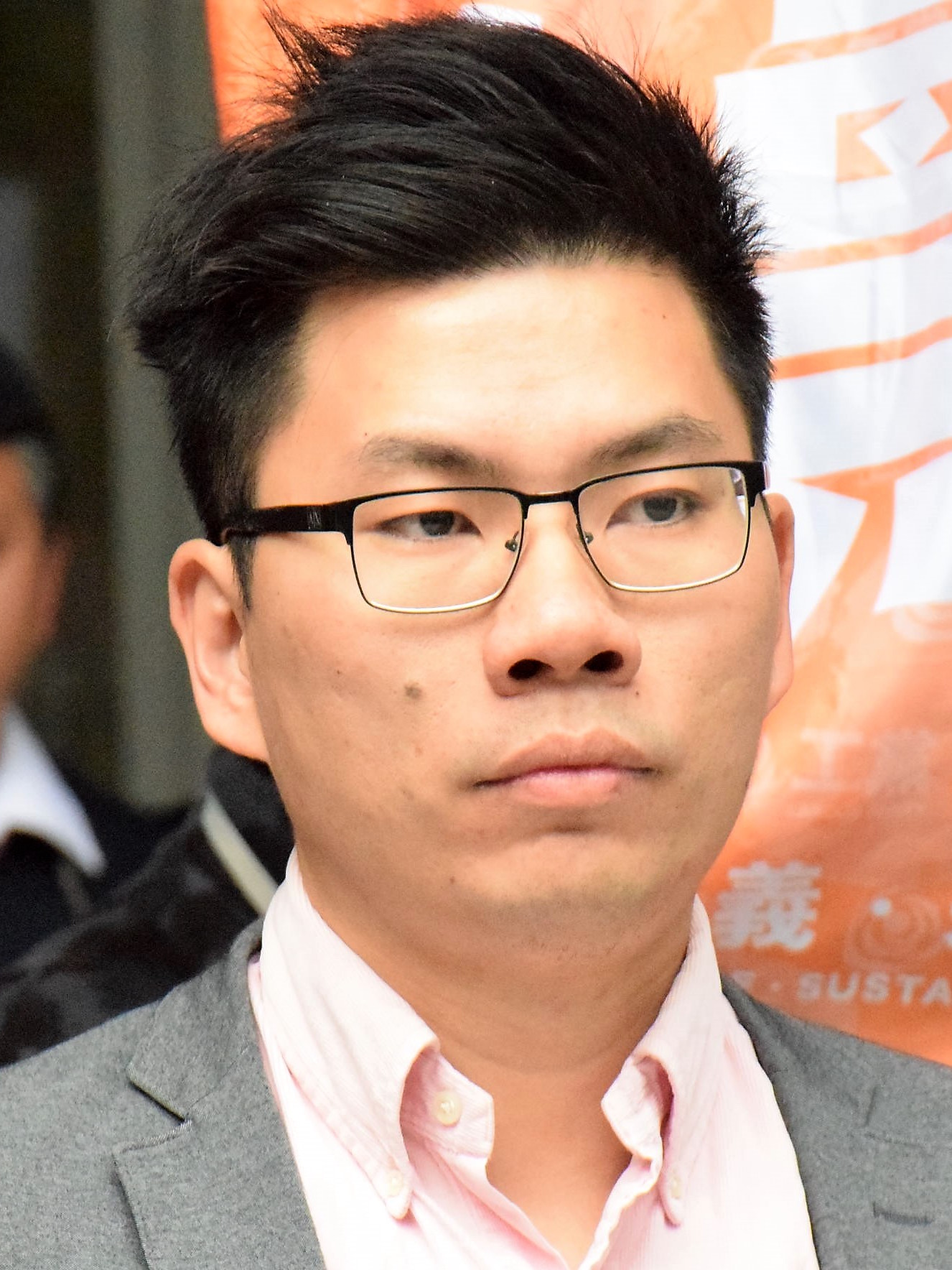
Kwok Wing-kin
jailed for 8 months

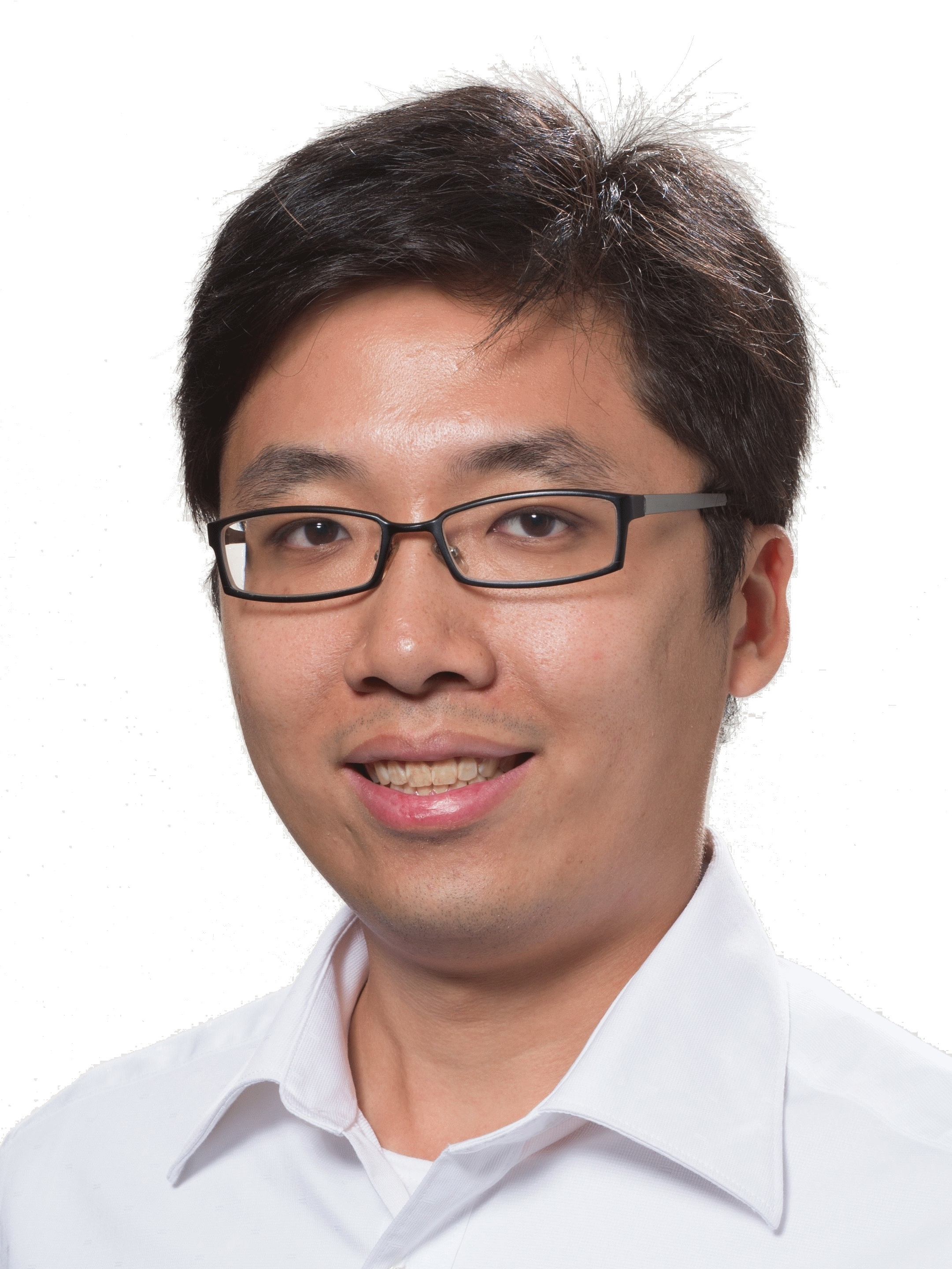
Chiu Yan-loy
jailed for 8 months

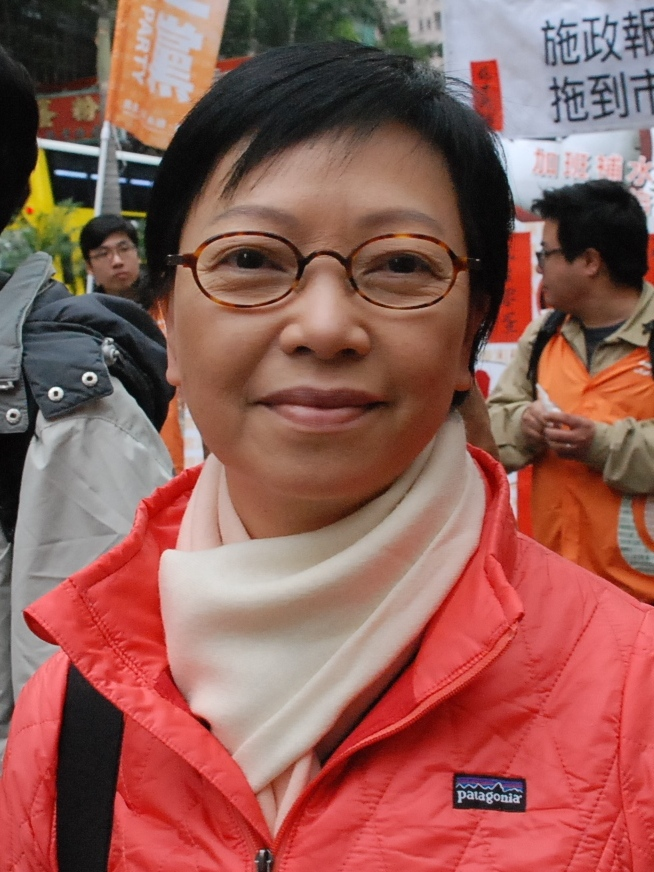
Cyd Ho
jailed for 6 months, served concurrently

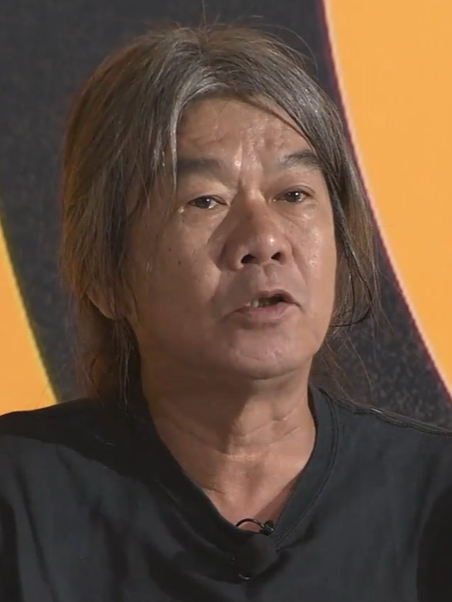
Leung Kwok-hung
jailed for 6 months, served concurrently

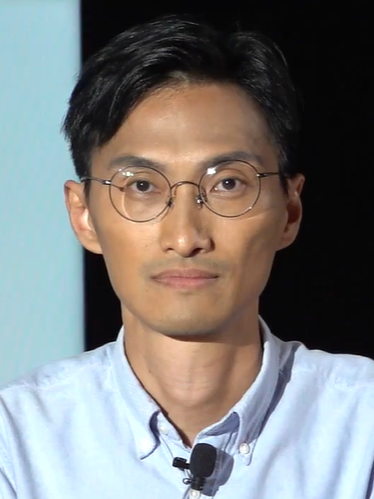
Eddie Chu
jailed for 6 months

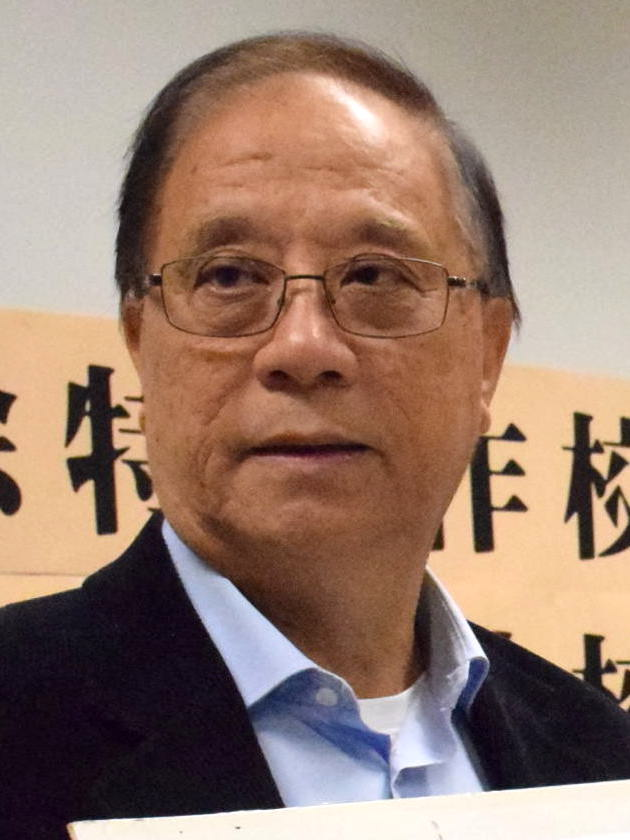
Yeung Sum
jailed for 6 months, served concurrently

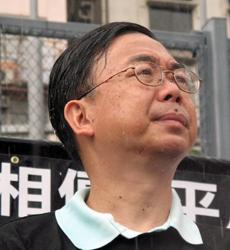
Cheung Man-kwong
suspended for 18 months

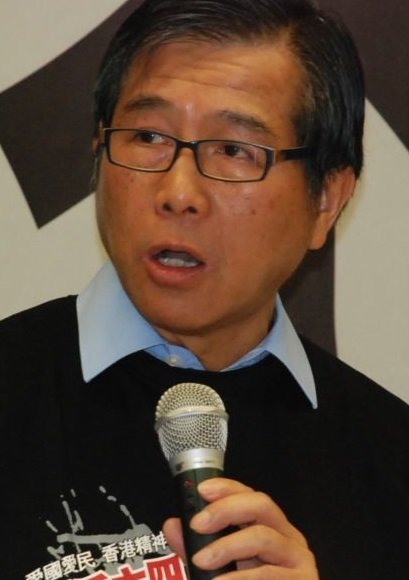
Mak Hoi-wah
suspended for 18 months

Leung Kwok-wah
suspended for 12 months

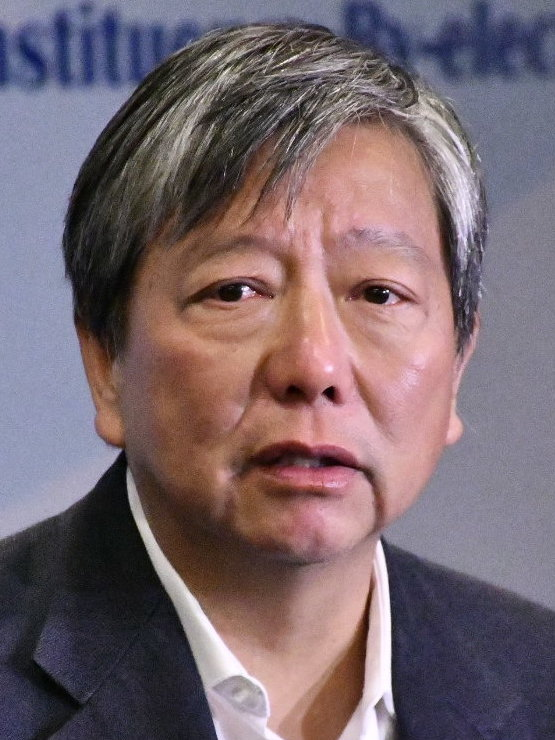
Lee Cheuk-yan
jailed for 14 months, served concurrently

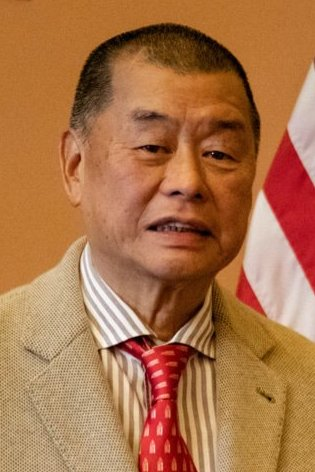
Jimmy Lai
jailed for 13 months, served concurrently

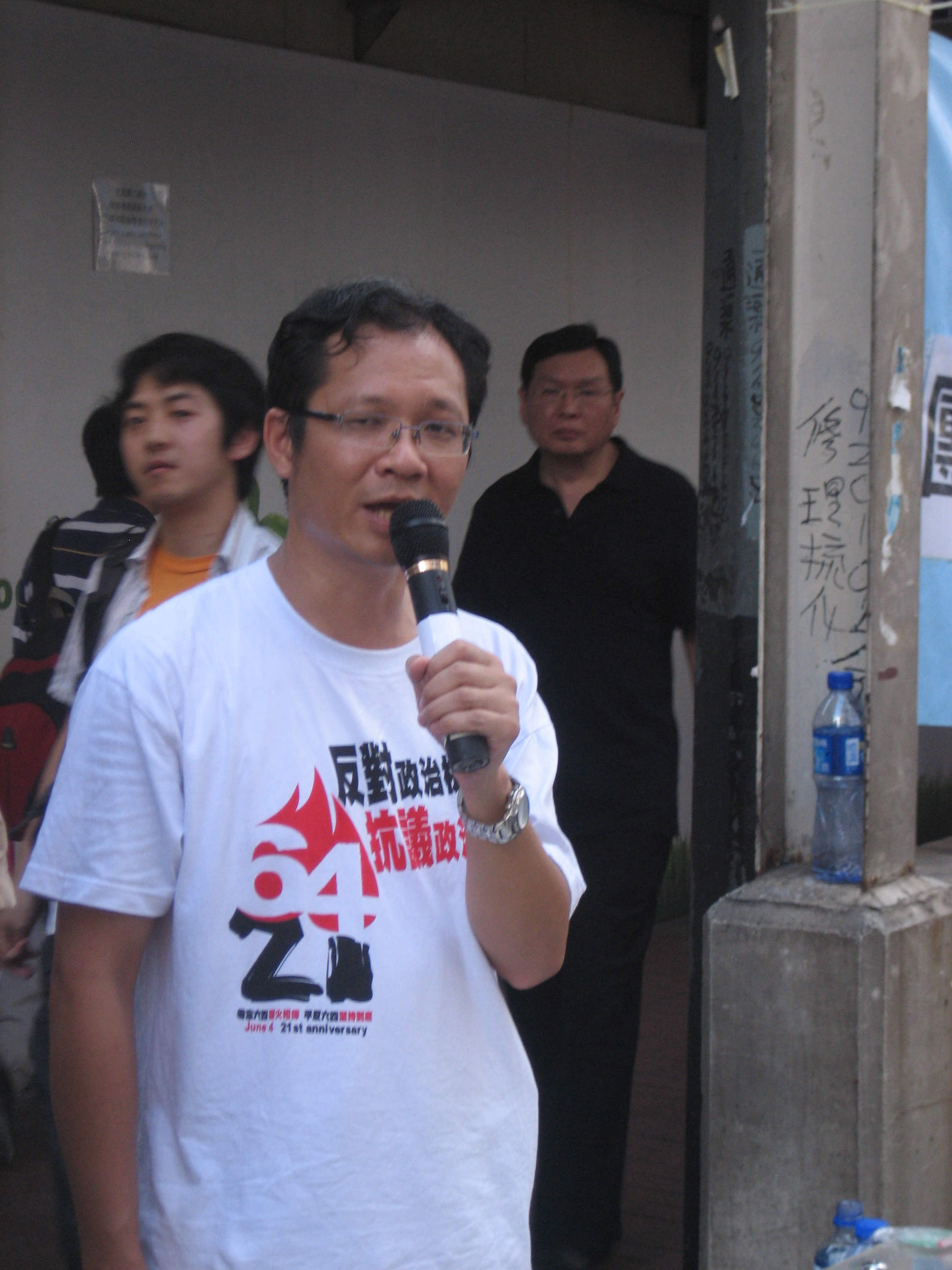
Richard Tsoi
jailed for 12 months

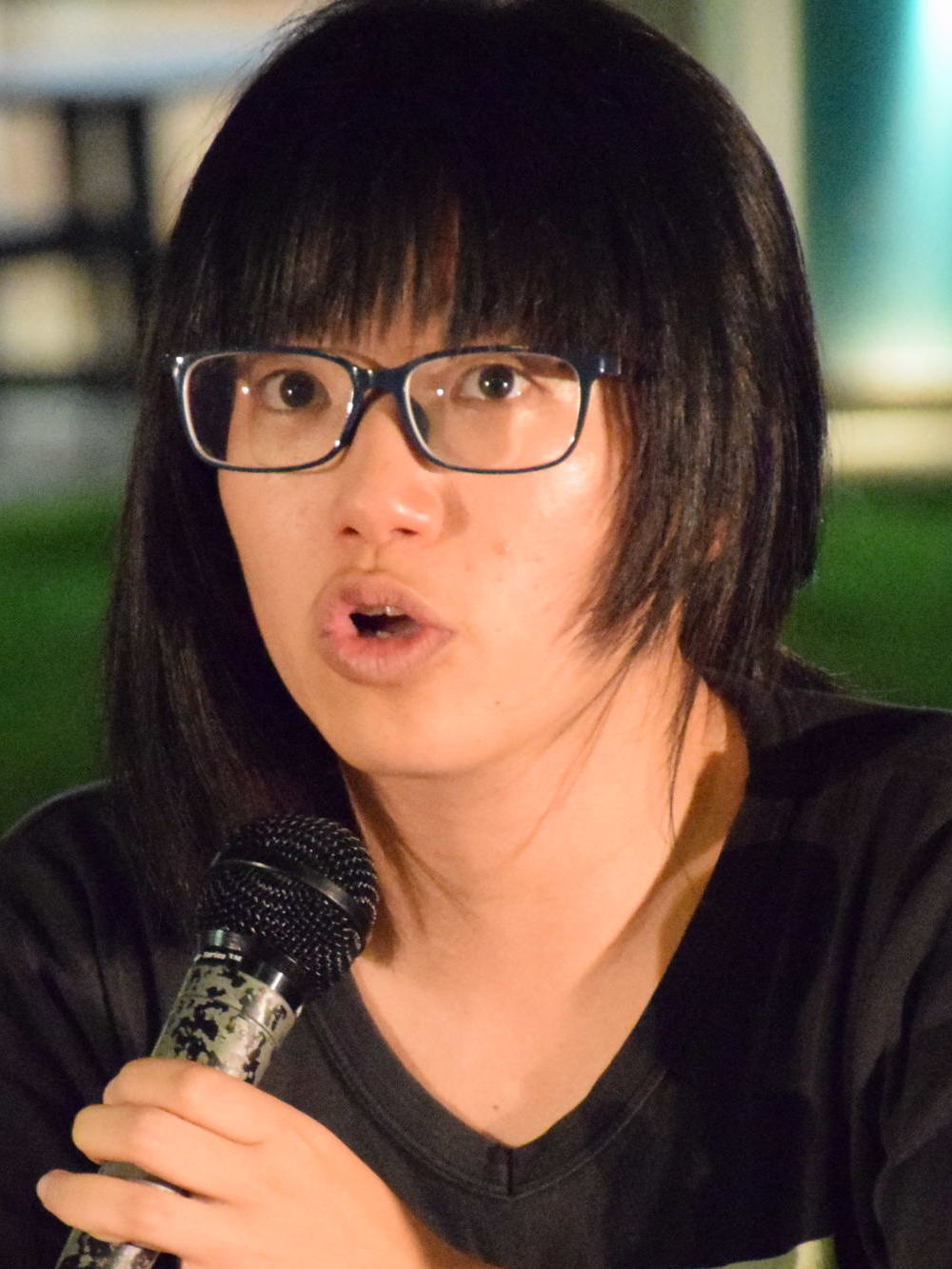
Chow Hang-tung
jailed for 12 months

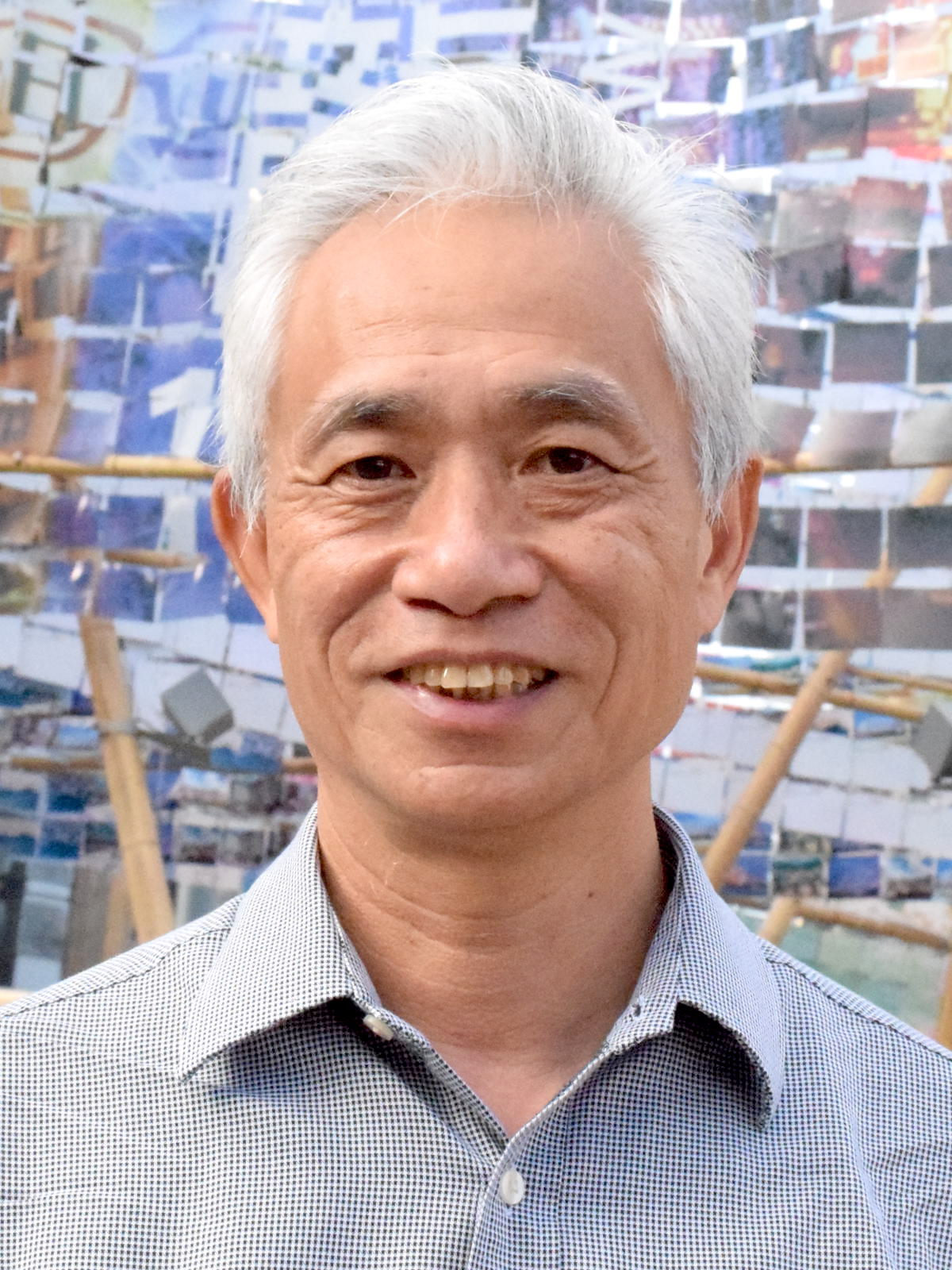
Leung Yiu-chung
jailed for 9 months

Simon Leung
jailed for 9 months

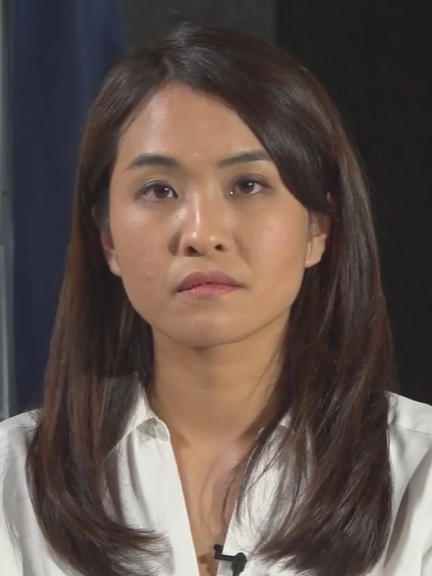
Gwyneth Ho
jailed for 6 months

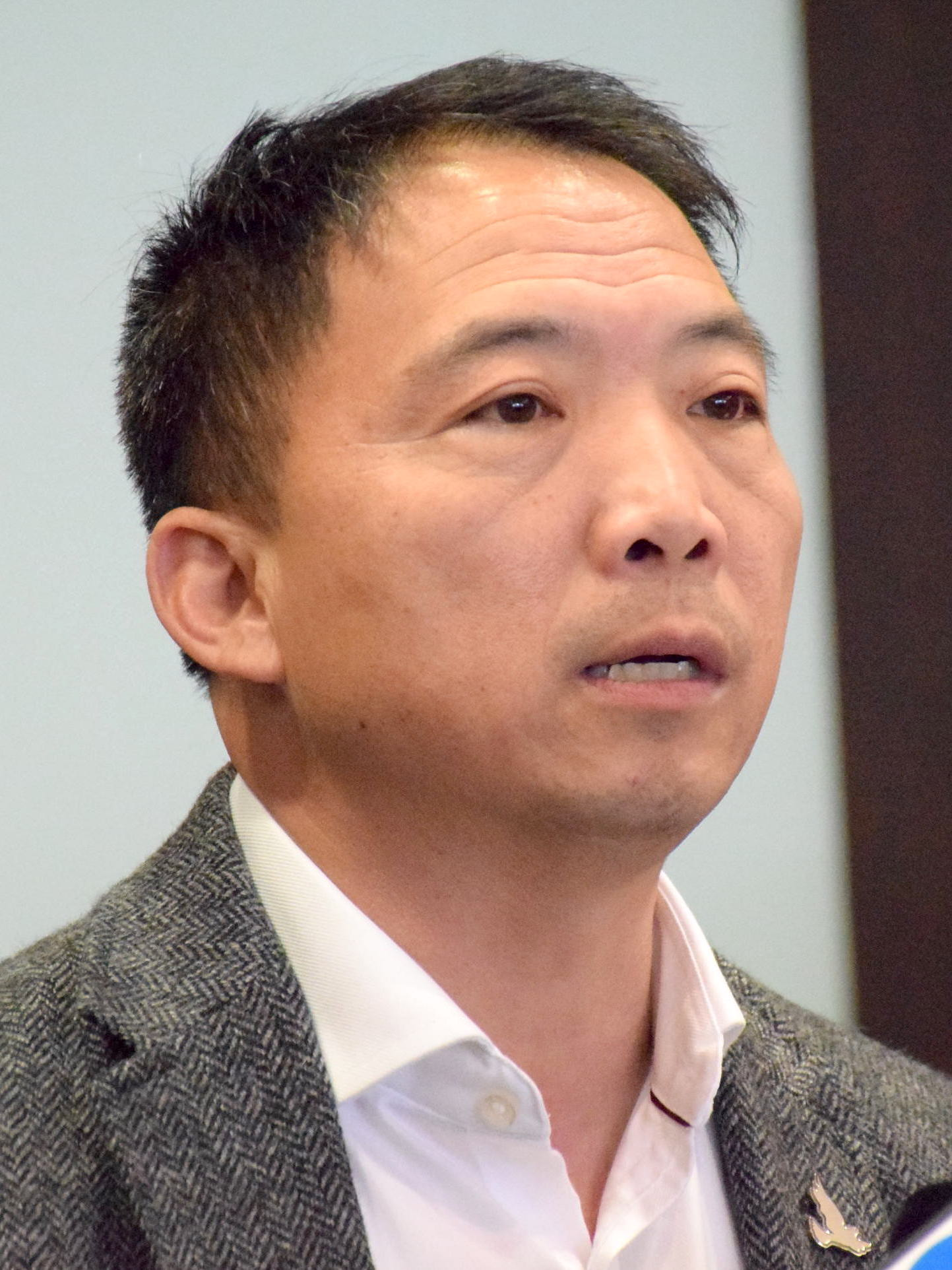
Wu Chi-wai
jailed for 4 months and 2 weeks, served concurrently

== Macau ==
In Macau, where the anniversary is remembered in a considerably more low key manner, the government revoked permission to hold an annual photographic exhibition themed on the massacre in 1989, on the pretext of the "standardisation of use of public spaces", drawing criticism from democratic advocates.

== Czech Republic ==
Hong Kong artist Loretta Lau, who is in Prague pursuing a master's degree in visual arts, held a vigil in Wenceslas Square where she presented a new work: Back to the Spring of Tiananmen. During the ceremony, she aimed to light 64 candles, followed by collective meditation with the other participants.
