= Chow Hang-tung =

Hong Kong activist, barrister, and politician

- 鄒幸彤
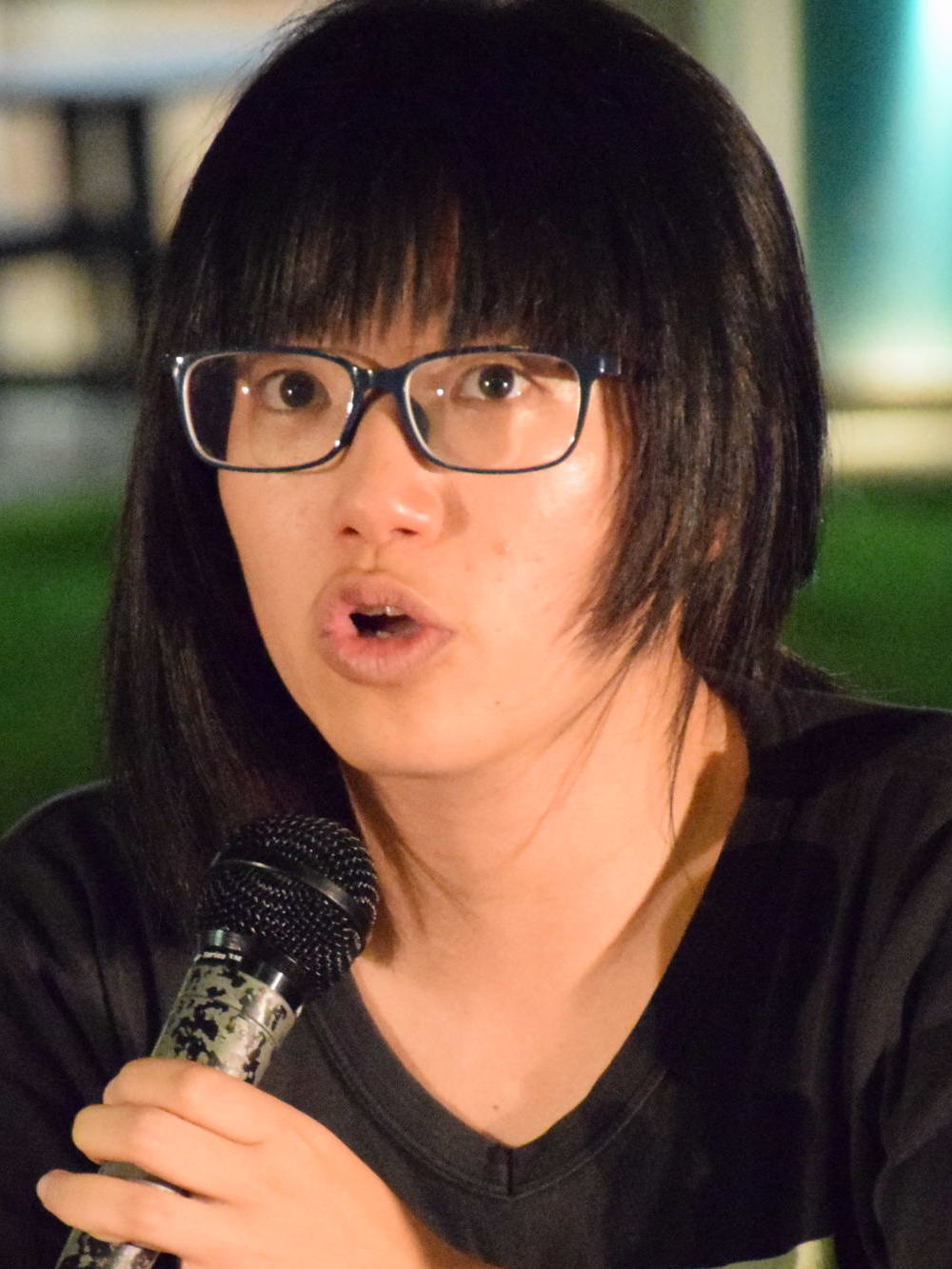
- Chow in 2021

Vice Chairman of the Hong Kong Alliance in Support of Patriotic Democratic Movements of China
- In office December 2015 – 25 September 2021
- Preceded by: Mak Hoi-wah
- Succeeded by: Organization dissolved

Personal details
- Born: 24 January 1985 (age 41) British Hong Kong
- Other political affiliations: Hong Kong Alliance in Support of Patriotic Democratic Movements of China
- Education: University of Cambridge (BA, MSc, MPhil); Manchester Metropolitan University (CPE, LLB); University of Hong Kong (PCLL)
- Occupation: Barrister; politician; political activist

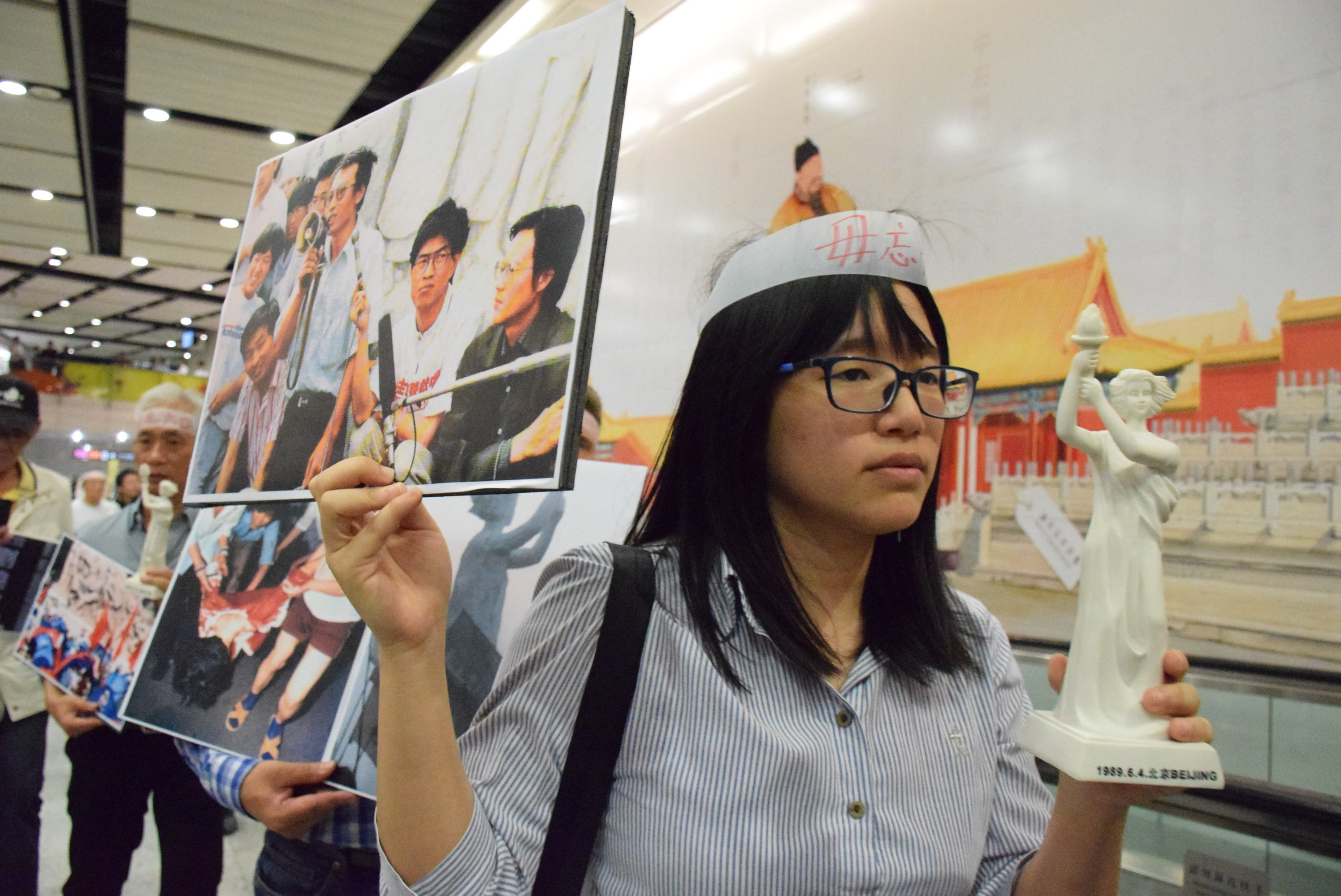
Chow at a rally in 2017

Tonyee Chow Hang-tung (Chinese: 鄒幸彤; born 24 January 1985) is a Hong Kong activist, barrister and politician. During the crackdown by authorities on the Hong Kong Alliance in Support of Patriotic Democratic Movements of China, which began in June 2021 and was mainly based on national security charges over the Alliance's annual vigils in remembrance of the 1989 Tiananmen Square protests and massacre, Chow was cast into the limelight, having become the convenor of the group after the arrest of leaders Lee Cheuk-yan and Albert Ho in April. In December 2021 and January 2022, Chow was convicted respectively for inciting and taking part in an unlawful assembly on occasion of the vigil in 2020, and for organizing the vigil in 2021, and sentenced to a total of 22 months in prison. The incitement to subversion charges against Chow relating to her activities in the Hong Kong Alliance resulted in observers considering her by late 2022 to be possibly the most prominent remaining dissident voice in Hong Kong. In September 2026, alongside Lee Cheuk-yan and Albert Ho as well as the Alliance itself, Chow was sentenced after having been found guilty of incitement to subversion, and jailed for seven years and three months.

== Early life and education ==
Chow was born and grew up in Hong Kong, attending Ying Wa Girls' School. She studied geophysics at University of Cambridge. Chow realised that human rights issues were her real interest, so she gave up doctoral studies and returned to Hong Kong in 2010, where she studied law at the University of Hong Kong after having spent some time working at an NGO.

A barrister with Harcourt Chambers, she was called to the Bar in Hong Kong in 2016.

== Political activism and arrests ==
Chow served as vice chairwoman of the Hong Kong Alliance, which organised annual marches and vigils to commemorate the 1989 Tiananmen Square protests. She was thrust into the limelight in 2021 because both Lee Cheuk-yan and Albert Ho from the Alliance were in prison, with Chow having become the new convenor.

On 4 June 2021, Chow was arrested for promoting an unauthorised assembly on the 32nd anniversary of the protests. Prior to her arrest, she had urged Hongkongers to "turn on the lights wherever you are – whether on your phone, candles or electronic candles". The Scotsman considered her arrest as an example of the Chinese government's "crushing of dissent in Hong Kong". Chow was released on bail on 5 June, but was arrested again on 30 June. On 2 July she appeared in court, which adjourned her case to 30 July whilst refusing to grant her bail. After further bail denials on 9 and 23 July, she was granted bail on 5 August on the condition of posting a cash bail and a surety of HK$50,000 ($6,400), handing over all travel documents, and submitting a declaration that she does not hold a BNO passport. Her case was scheduled for 5 October.

Chow was arrested again on 8 September 2021, after the Alliance had rejected a demand by police to surrender information regarding allegations that the Alliance was an "agent of foreign forces". Three other members of the Alliance were arrested at the same time, and a fourth one the following day.

On 9 September, police froze 2 million Hong Kong dollars' worth of assets of the Alliance, and charged Chow, alongside Ho, Lee and the Alliance itself with "incitement to subversion", a crime under the national security law, over the banned 2020 vigil. On 10 September, the court rejected the bail application of Chow over that charge. On 13 December, she was sentenced to 12 months in prison over the banned 2020 vigil. On 4 January 2022, she was jailed for another 15 months over the banned 2021 vigil; the judge ordered 10 months of the sentence to be served consecutively with the December sentence, meaning that Chow was to spend a total of 22 months in jail. The judge did not accept the reasoning of Chow, who defended herself, that she had wanted to "incite others not to forget June 4", not encourage a gathering, which the judge dismissed as "simply unbelievable". During the mitigation hearing the same day, Chow, who had pleaded not guilty, was reading from the memoirs of families of people killed at Tiananmen until admonished by the judge, who said that the court would not allow Chow to make a political statement.

On 14 December 2022, Chow won an appeal against her 15-month sentence over the banned 2021 vigil. The presiding judge said in a written statement that police "did not raise measures or conditions to be considered" in order to let the vigil take place during the pandemic. An application by the Hong Kong government to appeal against this ruling was approved by the Court of Final Appeal in June 2023. On 25 January 2024 Chow's acquittal was overturned by a panel of five judges in favor of the prosecution. She remained in a maximum security prison having been denied bail due to her separate national security charge, and due to her conviction, together with Hong Kong Alliance members Tang Ngok-kwan and Tsui Hon-kwong, to 4.5 months in jail in March 2023 over the refusal to comply with the data demand. The retrial at the High Court ended on 21 February 2024 with the 15-month sentence being upheld.

On 28 May 2024, Chow was arrested for alleged publication of seditious social media posts, in connection with a Facebook page related to the impending anniversary of the Tiananmen crackdown. The arrests were the first under the Safeguarding National Security Ordinance that had taken effect in March 2024.

During the sentencing hearing she was cut off after reading out the first few sentences of her mitigation statement, which was uploaded on a personal page after the hearing and is quoted here:

The Court pretends the issue is not about sharing ideas, but rather the so- called sowing of hostility. Yet, the belief in ‘ending one-party dictatorship’ has never relied on an us-versus-them mentality or the incitement of hatred to sustain itself... As for the future, whether inside or outside prison, I will persistently strive to release pro-democracy activists, vindicate the 1989 Democracy Movement, hold those responsible for the Massacre to account, end one-party dictatorship and build a democratic Hong Kong and China. I will learn, improve myself, and try all manner of things until the day democracy arrives. This is a promise I have made publicly countless times. It is the solemn vow I made to the departed in the sea of candles, and I have no intention of breaking my word. If doing so makes me a criminal for life – if the law truly cannot accommodate our beliefs – then I would rather be a criminal than a person who betrays their conscience.

On 11 September 2026, Chow was sentenced in the incitement of subversion case to seven years and three months in prison.

Chow regularly represented herself in court cases.

== International reactions ==
The United Nations Human Rights Council released a statement on 12 October 2021 which said that four of its human rights experts (Fionnuala Ní Aoláin, Clément Nyaletsossi Voule, Irene Khan and Mary Lawlor) had submitted a detailed analysis to the Chinese central government regarding the national security law. In its criticism of the law, which it described, in the wording of the statement, as exhibiting "fundamental incompatibility with international law and with China's human rights obligations", it specifically expressed deep concern about the arrest of Chow and about her right to a free trial in view of her having been denied bail twice. A report by the Working Group on Arbitrary Detention which was issued after a meeting in March and April 2023 rejected the legal basis for Chow's arrest and said that "no trial of Ms. Chow should take place." The Hong Kong government rejected that report and, at the same time, warned against commenting on ongoing legal cases, as became known through a UN report in August 2024.

=== Awards ===
- Franco-German Prize for Human Rights and the Rule of Law 2023
- CCBE Human Rights Award 2023, Council of Bars and Law Societies of Europe
- 2023 Gwangju Prize for Human Rights, by the South Korean May 18 Foundation

== See also ==
- List of Chinese pro-democracy activists

Non-profit organization positions
Preceded by Mak Hoi-wah	Vice Chairman of Hong Kong Alliance in Support of Patriotic Democratic Movements of China; 2015–2021	Organization dissolved
