= Zhou Fengsuo =

Chinese human rights activist

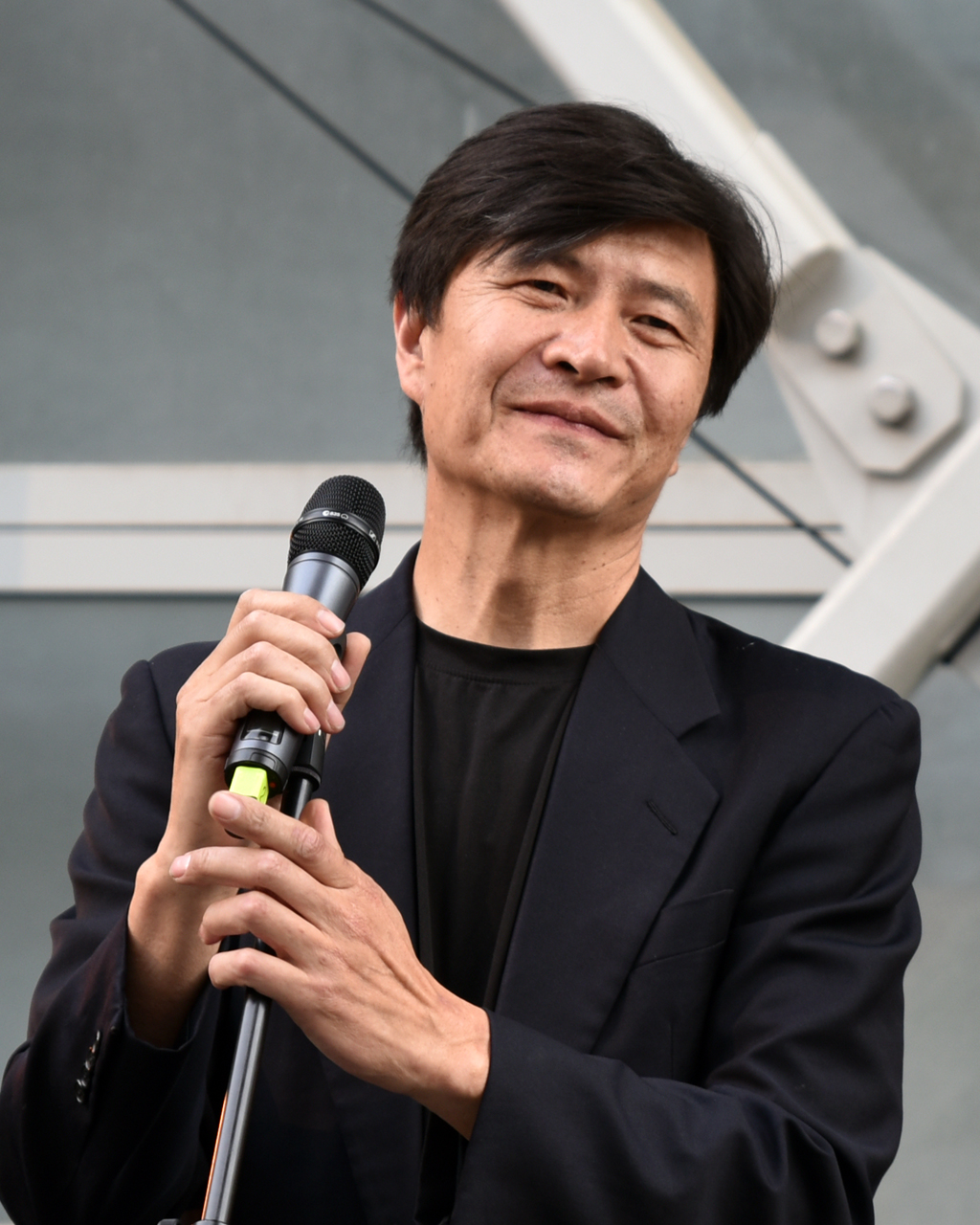
- Zhou Fengsuo in 2022
- Born: Zhou Fengsuo; October 5, 1967 (age 58); Xi'an, China
- Citizenship: United States
- Education: Tsinghua University (BA) The University of Chicago Booth School of Business (MBA)
- Occupations: Human rights activist, Investor
- Known for: Student leader during Tiananmen Square Protest
- Title: President of Humanitarian China; Co-founder of the China Human Rights Accountability Center
- Website: h-china.org

Zhou Fengsuo
- Traditional Chinese: 周鋒鎖
- Simplified Chinese: 周锋锁
Transcriptions
Standard Mandarin
- Hanyu Pinyin: Zhōu Fēngsuǒ
- IPA: [ʈʂóʊ fə́ŋ.swò]

Zhou Fengsuo (Chinese: 周锋锁; pinyin: Zhōu Fēngsuǒ; born October 5, 1967) is a Chinese human rights activist, investor, and former student leader during the Tiananmen Square protests of 1989. He was listed number 5 on the government's most wanted and forced into exile in the United States over his role in the student movement. Zhou attained his MBA degree from University of Chicago Booth School of Business and had been working in the finance industry in recent years. He is currently the president of Humanitarian China and Co-founder of the China Human Rights Accountability Center.

== Early life and education ==
Zhou was born in Xi'an, Shaanxi, China on October 5, 1967. He enrolled at Tsinghua University in 1985 and majored in physics. Zhou was elected to be a leader of the Beijing Students' Autonomous Federation in 1989. Due to his active engagement of the student-led pro-democracy protests in Tiananmen Square in 1989, Zhou was arrested and imprisoned for a year. He left China in 1995 for the United States, where he studied analytic finance and accounting, and earned his MBA degree from the University of Chicago Booth School of Business in 1998.

== 1989 Tiananmen Square protests and massacre ==
Zhou actively promoted democracy across campus through organizing direct election within the students' union, initiated student clubs, advocating freedom for students newspapers, and started The Voice of Students (学运之声) radio station in 1989. Zhou organized and participated in the protests, and was engaged in providing medical help for the protesters to ensure their safety during the hunger strike.

Shortly after the 1989 Tiananmen Square protests and massacre, Zhou was listed as number five on the government's wanted list and was soon arrested from his home in Xi'an. Allegedly, Zhou's sister and her husband turned him in to the police. Zhou was then imprisoned in Qincheng for a year. He was released in 1990 due to international support.

== Post-Tiananmen Square ==
After being released from Qincheng, Zhou was exiled to Yangyuan, Hebei for a year. Zhou's involvement in the protests also led to legal complications that prevented him from getting his passport for years. Amid constant monitoring and police harassment, sometimes with friends whose experiences had been similar to his own, Zhou struggled to earn a living.

=== Immigration to the United States ===
In 1995, Zhou moved to the United States with no prospect of returning home legally. He graduated with honors and received his MBA degree from the University of Chicago Booth School of Business in 1998. He became a Christian in 2003 and has worked in finance in recent years. He co-founded Humanitarian China in 2007, a group that promotes the rule of law and civil society in China and raises money for Chinese political prisoners.

Zhou worked at Bear Stearns as an option currency trader, where he initiated and structured the currency-linked notes program, managed the proprietary options trading book in major currencies, and designed customized hedging and trading strategies for both corporate and high net-worth clients (1998–2001). He later worked and became the Director of Portfolio Oversight at AXA Rosenberg Investment Management (2001–2017).

=== Activism ===
In September 2000, Zhou was the leading plaintiff in a lawsuit by Tiananmen Massacre victims against Li Peng for crimes against humanity in 1989. This was the first of many lawsuits in United States filed against the officials of the Chinese Communist Party.

In an interview with South China Morning Post, Zhou stated that he still believed the core issues being protested back in 1989 remain unresolved, such as government corruption. "There is pretty much a consensus today in China that government officials should disclose their assets," he said. The past 25 years had proven "that the massacre was for this small fraction of families that control China, not for the general well-being of the Chinese. If you look at the people who were hardliners 25 years ago, they are all billionaires now."

From 2007 to 2010, Zhou was the President of the Chinese Democracy Education Foundation, which aims to promote "the prosperity and progress of Chinese society for democracy, freedom and human rights." He co-founded Humanitarian China in 2007 with the vision to develop a network of loosely connected grassroots NGOs to promote human rights and rule of law, and to provide humanitarian support to political prisoners in China.

Zhou actively participates in discussions on campuses across the U.S. in an effort to bring about awareness to students who are unfamiliar with the issues. On April 3, 2019, Zhou joined a panel discussion at Wesleyan University on the May Fourth Movement in 1919 and the Tiananmen Square Protests in 1989. He stated, "For our generation, it was the biggest event. I feel lucky to have been a part. Most remember only the bloodshed and the massacre, but what people really need to remember is what had happened before the crackdown. It was the one time I experienced the beautiful character of the Chinese people longing for a democratic China, where we could freely speak our minds." In 2024, he received a Gold Medal for Outstanding Contributions to Public Discourse from the College Historical Society of Trinity College Dublin, where he discussed the protests and the state of human rights in China.

On the eve of the 32nd anniversary of the Tiananmen Square Protests, as vigils in Hong Kong had been banned by authorities ostensibly due to the COVID-19 pandemic, Zhou said that Hongkongers "would need a lot of courage to deal with the enormous challenges coming their way" as they faced "Beijing's encroachment". He said it would be important for activists abroad and in Hong Kong to maintain their connections.

=== Secret trip back to China ===
On the twenty-fifth anniversary of the June Fourth crackdown, Zhou, now a US citizen, took advantage of China's policy of allowing 72-hour transit stops without a visa and managed to slip into the country briefly, even though Beijing took extreme measures to prevent public observances. While driving in a loop with his friend in Tiananmen Square, Zhou resisted his temptation to carry out a public protest, fearing that he would be quickly muzzled and "would be gone in a minute."

Zhou said he showed solidarity by paying a visit to his friend Gao Yu, a former reporter who wrote about the Tiananmen Protests and was jailed, alongside human rights lawyer Pu Zhiqiang, at a detention center. Zhou faced no problem when he identified himself at the reception; later police came to his hotel on the pretext of searching for drugs and interrogated him at length. He was then put on a flight back to the United States, Zhou said.

Zhou revealed that prior to this visit, he had visited China on two other occasions in which no friends nor family knew of his plans beforehand. In response to his recent episode, Zhou acknowledged that a future visit might be much more difficult.

=== Censorship by LinkedIn and Zoom ===
In January 2019, LinkedIn sent Zhou a message, saying although the company "strongly supports freedom of expression," his profile and activities would not be viewable to users in China because of "specific content on your profile." Hours later, LinkedIn reversed its decision and Zhou's profile was quickly restored on the Chinese platform after a wave of negative publicity.

On June 1, 2020, Zoom closed Zhou's paid account a week after he held an event discussing the 1989 Tiananmen Square protests.
