= Demographics of Montreal =

The Demographics of Montreal concern population growth and structure for Montreal, Quebec, Canada. The information is analyzed by Statistics Canada and compiled every five years, with the most recent census having taken place in 2021.

== Population history ==
Population of Montreal, and Metropolitan Area by year
Year	City	Island	Metropolitan
1660		407
1663		596
1666		624
1681		1,389
1700		2,969
1760		8,300
1771		9,770
1781		17,945
1791		18,000
1801	9,000
1811	13,300
1821	18,767
1831	27,297
1841	40,356
1851	57,715
1861	90,323
1871	130,022	144,044	174,090
1881	176,263	193,171	223,512
1891	254,278	277,525	308,169
1901	325,653	360,838	393,665
1911	490,504	554,761	594,812
1921	618,506	724,205	774,330
1931	818,577	1,003,868	1,064,448
1941	903,007	1,116,800	1,192,235
1951	1,021,520	1,320,232	1,539,308
1956	1,109,439	1,507,653	1,745,001
1961	1,201,559	1,747,696	2,110,679
1966	1,293,992	1,923,971	2,570,985
1971	1,214,352	1,958,595	2,743,208
1976	1,080,545	1,869,645	2,802,485
1981	1,018,609	1,760,120	2,862,286
1986	1,015,420	1,752,361	2,921,357
1991	1,017,666	1,775,871	3,127,242
1996	1,016,376	1,775,778	3,326,447
2001	1,039,534	1,812,723	3,426,350
2006	1,620,693	1,854,442	3,635,571
2011	1,649,519	1,886,481	3,824,221
2016	1,704,694	1,942,044	4,098,927
2021	1,762,949	2,004,265	4,291,732

According to Statistics Canada, at the time of the 2011 Canadian census the city of Montreal proper had 1,649,519 inhabitants. A total of 3,824,221 lived in the Montreal Census Metropolitan Area (CMA) at the same 2011 census, up from 3,635,556 at the 2006 census (within 2006 CMA boundaries), which means a population growth rate of +5.2% between 2006 and 2011. Montreal's 2012-2013 population growth rate was 1.135%, compared with 1.533% for all Canadian CMAs.

In the 2006 census, children under 14 years of age (621,695) constituted 17.1%, while inhabitants over 65 years of age (495,685) numbered 13.6% of the total population.

=== Future projections ===
The current estimate of the Montreal CMA population, as of July 1, 2013, according to Statistics Canada is 3,981,802. According to StatsCan, by 2030, the Greater Montreal Area is expected to number 5,275,000 with 1,722,000 being visible minorities.

== Ethnic diversity ==
=== City of Montreal ===
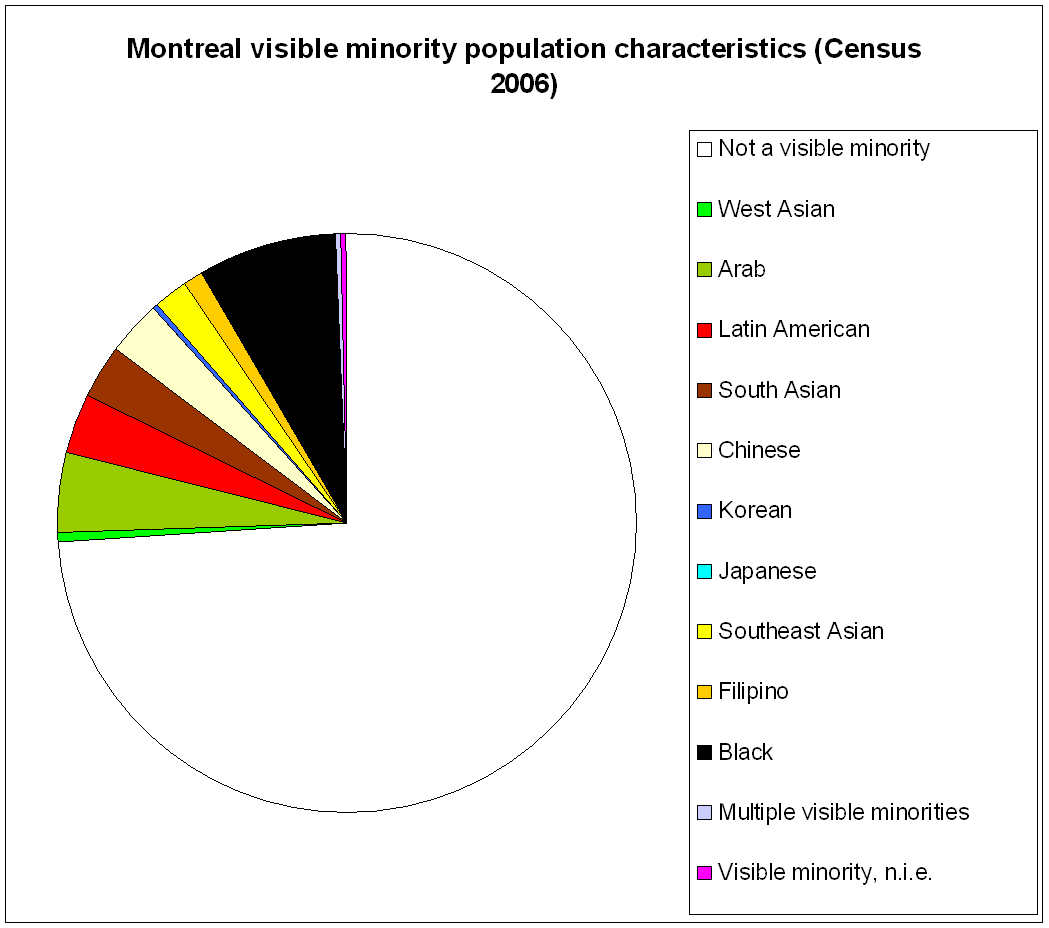
Pie chart showing Montreal's visible minority composition (data from Canada Census 2006).

According to the 2021 census, some 38.8% of the population of Montreal and 27.2% that of Metro Montreal, are members of a visible minority (non-white) group. Blacks (198,610 persons or 11.5%) contribute to the largest minority group, with Montreal having the 2nd highest number of black people in Canada after Toronto, as well as having the highest concentrations of black people amongst major Canadian cities. Other groups, such as Arabs (141,935 persons or 8.2%), South Asians (79,670 persons or 4.6%), Latin Americans (78,150 persons or 4.5%), and Chinese (56,935 persons or 3.3%) are also large in number. Visible minorities are defined by the Canadian Employment Equity Act as "persons, other than Aboriginals, who are non-Caucasian in race or non-white in colour."

Largest panethnic groups in Island of Montreal by census tract based on the 2021 census

Panethnic groups in the City of Montreal (2001−2021)
Panethnic group	2021		2016		2011		2006		2001	
Panethnic group	Pop.	%	Pop.	%	Pop.	%	Pop.	%	Pop.	%
European (Note: Statistic includes all persons that did not make up part of a visible minority or an indigenous identity.)	1,038,940	60.29%	1,082,620	65.09%	1,092,465	67.74%	1,171,295	73.49%	784,420	76.92%
African	198,610	11.53%	171,385	10.3%	147,100	9.12%	122,880	7.71%	68,245	6.69%
Middle Eastern (Note: Statistic includes total responses of "West Asian" and "Arab" under visible minority section on census.)	159,435	9.25%	137,525	8.27%	114,780	7.12%	76,910	4.83%	34,035	3.34%
South Asian	79,670	4.62%	55,595	3.34%	53,515	3.32%	51,255	3.22%	33,310	3.27%
Latin American	78,150	4.54%	67,525	4.06%	67,160	4.16%	53,970	3.39%	31,190	3.06%
Southeast Asian (Note: Statistic includes total responses of "Filipino" and "Southeast Asian" under visible minority section on census.)	65,260	3.79%	58,315	3.51%	61,320	3.8%	47,950	3.01%	33,505	3.29%
East Asian (Note: Statistic includes total responses of "Chinese", "Korean", and "Japanese" under visible minority section on census.)	64,825	3.76%	61,400	3.69%	52,195	3.24%	52,650	3.3%	25,810	2.53%
Indigenous	15,315	0.89%	12,035	0.72%	9,510	0.59%	7,600	0.48%	3,555	0.35%
Other (Note: Statistic includes total responses of "Visible minority, n.i.e." and "Multiple visible minorities" under visible minority section on census.)	23,010	1.34%	16,835	1.01%	14,585	0.9%	9,205	0.58%	5,675	0.56%
Total responses	1,723,230	97.75%	1,663,225	97.57%	1,612,640	97.76%	1,593,725	98.34%	1,019,735	98.1%
Total population	1,762,949	100%	1,704,694	100%	1,649,519	100%	1,620,693	100%	1,039,534	100%
Note: Totals greater than 100% due to multiple origin responses

Visible minority and Indigenous population in the City of Montreal
Group	2021		2016		2011		2006		2001	
Group	Pop.	%	Pop.	%	Pop.	%	Pop.	%	Pop.	%
Visible minority	668,975	38.8%	568,570	34.2%	510,665	31.7%	414,830	26%	231,760	22.7%
Indigenous	15,315	0.9%	12,035	0.7%	9,510	0.6%	7,600	0.5%	3,555	0.3%

Visible minorities and Indigenous peoples in the City of Montreal (2021 Census)
Population group		Population	% of total population
Visible minority	Black	198,610	11.5%
Visible minority	Arab	141,935	8.2%
Visible minority	South Asian	79,670	4.6%
Visible minority	Latin American	78,150	4.5%
Visible minority	Chinese	56,935	3.3%
Visible minority	Southeast Asian	37,905	2.2%
Visible minority	Filipino	27,355	1.6%
Visible minority	West Asian	17,500	1%
Visible minority	Korean	5,245	0.3%
Visible minority	Japanese	2,645	0.2%
Visible minority	Mixed visible minority	17,540	1%
Visible minority	Visible minority, n.i.e.	5,470	0.3%
Total visible minority population		668,975	38.8%
Indigenous	First Nations	8,065	0.5%
Indigenous	Métis	5,705	0.3%
Indigenous	Inuit	545	0%
Indigenous	Other	1,000	0.1%
Total Indigenous population		15,315	0.9%
European		1,038,940	60.3%
Total responses		1,723,230	97.7%
Total population		1,762,949	100%

=== Greater Montreal ===
Panethnic groups in Greater Montreal (1981−2021)
Panethnic group	2021		2016		2011		2006		2001		1996		1981	
Panethnic group	Pop.	%	Pop.	%	Pop.	%	Pop.	%	Pop.	%	Pop.	%	Pop.	%
European (Note: 2001-2016: Statistic includes all persons that did not make up part of a visible minority or an indigenous identity. 2021: Statistic includes all persons belonging to the non-indigenous and non-visible minority “White” population group.)	3,059,895	72.74%	3,070,210	76.57%	2,963,860	78.98%	2,980,280	83.05%	2,911,230	86.11%	2,876,260	87.49%	—N/a	—N/a
African	340,140	8.09%	270,940	6.76%	216,310	5.76%	169,065	4.71%	139,305	4.12%	122,320	3.72%	—N/a	—N/a
Middle Eastern	285,615	6.79%	220,055	5.49%	172,345	4.59%	113,405	3.16%	79,410	2.35%	73,950	2.25%	—N/a	—N/a
Latin American	137,850	3.28%	110,195	2.75%	98,010	2.61%	75,400	2.1%	53,155	1.57%	46,700	1.42%	—N/a	—N/a
South Asian	121,260	2.88%	85,925	2.14%	79,540	2.12%	70,615	1.97%	57,935	1.71%	46,165	1.4%	—N/a	—N/a
East Asian	116,820	2.78%	100,265	2.5%	83,420	2.22%	79,665	2.22%	58,165	1.72%	51,930	1.58%	—N/a	—N/a
Southeast Asian	101,560	2.41%	88,755	2.21%	89,645	2.39%	68,475	1.91%	57,460	1.7%	51,985	1.58%	—N/a	—N/a
Indigenous	46,085	1.1%	34,745	0.87%	26,285	0.7%	17,865	0.5%	11,085	0.33%	9,960	0.3%	—N/a	—N/a
Other/Multiracial	40,565	0.96%	28,710	0.72%	23,060	0.61%	13,755	0.38%	12,900	0.38%	8,365	0.25%	—N/a	—N/a
Total: Visible minority	1,143,810	27.19%	904,845	22.57%	762,330	20.32%	590,380	16.45%	458,330	13.56%	401,425	12.21%	146,365	5.23%
Total responses	4,206,455	98.01%	4,009,795	97.83%	3,752,470	98.12%	3,588,520	98.71%	3,380,645	98.67%	3,287,645	98.83%	2,798,040	97.76%
Total population	4,291,732	100%	4,098,927	100%	3,824,221	100%	3,635,571	100%	3,426,350	100%	3,326,447	100%	2,862,286	100%
Note: Totals greater than 100% due to multiple origin responses

Top 25 Ethnic Origins in Montreal CMA (2016) Includes Multiple Responses
Ethnic origin	Population	Percentage
Canadian	1,670,655	43.8%
French	870,245	21.7%
Italian	279,800	7.0%
Irish	239,460	6.0%
English	138,320	3.4%
Haitian	132,255	3.3%
Scottish	124,130	3.1%
Chinese	108,775	2.7%
First Nations	101,915	2.5%
Québécois	92,115	2.3%
German	86,025	2.1%
Algerian	84,585	2.1%
Moroccan	77,450	1.9%
Spanish	68,600	1.7%
Greek	66,395	1.7%
Lebanese	68,765	1.7%
Polish	64,895	1.6%
Portuguese	56,405	1.4%
Russian	49,275	1.2%
East Indian	48,485	1.2%
Romanian	47,980	1.2%
Vietnamese	38,660	1.0%
Filipino	35,685	0.9%
Ukrainian	35,050	0.8%
Belgian	31,840	0.8%

==== Future projections ====
Panethnic origin projections (2041)
	2041	
	Population	%
European (Note: Statistic includes all persons that did not make up part of a visible minority or an aboriginal identity.)	3,249,000	58.97%
African	673,000	12.21%
Middle Eastern	597,000	10.83%
East Asian	252,000	4.57%
Latin American	213,000	3.87%
South Asian	195,000	3.54%
Southeast Asian	167,000	3.03%
Indigenous	87,000	1.58%
Other/multiracial	76,000	1.38%
Projected Metro Montreal Population	5,510,000	100%

=== Ethnic groups ===
==== Indigenous ====
In 2021, there were 46,090 Indigenous people living in Greater Montreal.

==== European ====
===== French =====
Montreal is the cultural centre of Quebec, French-speaking Canada and French-speaking North America as a whole, and an important city in the Francophonie. The majority of the population is francophone. Montreal is the largest French-speaking city in North America, and second in the world after Paris when counting the number of native-language Francophones (third after Paris and Kinshasa when counting second-language speakers). The city is a hub for French language television productions, radio, theatre, circuses, performing arts, film, multimedia and print publishing.

Montreal plays a prominent role in the development of French-Canadian and Québécois culture. Its contribution to culture is therefore more of a society-building endeavour rather than limited to civic influence. The best talents from French Canada and even the French-speaking areas of the United States converge in Montreal and often perceive the city as their cultural capital. Montreal is also the most important stop in the Americas for Francophone artists from Europe, Africa and Asia.

The cultural divide between Canada's Francophone and Anglophone culture is strong and was famously referred to as the "Two Solitudes" by Canadian writer Hugh MacLennan. Reflecting their deep-seated colonial roots, the Solitudes were historically strongly entrenched in Montreal, splitting the city geographically at Saint Laurent Boulevard.

===== British Isles =====
Montreal is the focal point of Quebec's English-speaking community. Arriving in waves from the United Kingdom and eventually the entire British Commonwealth, the historical English-speaking community in Montreal includes Quebecers of English, Scottish, and Irish origin (as reflected in the city's flag) as well as Loyalists, escaped slaves, and immigrants from the Caribbean and the Indian subcontinent.

With the advent of mass migration from beyond the confines of the British Empire, the English-speaking community in Montreal expanded to include a huge array of different cultures and ethnic groups. Since Chinese, Jewish, Greek, and other non-Catholic immigrants were barred from attending French-language Catholic schools under the Confessional school system, they attended English-language Protestant schools instead and became acculturated into the English-speaking community. This trend was boosted by the Catholic Church's policy, called la Revanche des berceaux or the "Revenge of the Cradle", of encouraging French-Canadians to maintain a very high birth-rate in order to bolster the community's demographic weight in Canada. This policy, along with the Church's traditional mistrust of entrepreneurship and the business world, caused French-Canadians in Quebec to remain largely poor and rural while shunning immigration in an attempt to resist assimilation. Immigrants who arrived prior to the Quiet Revolution therefore largely assimilated into the increasingly diverse English-speaking community in Montreal, while the city's French-speaking community remained largely white, French, and Catholic, growing through high birth rates and migration from the countryside rather than immigration.

During the Quiet Revolution, French Quebecers left the Church en masse and birth rates fell drastically as they began to question the Duplessis-era establishment's legitimacy. This awakening coincided with the arrival of a massive wave of Italian immigrants who, despite being Catholic, demanded English-language training and bilingual schools for their children. This community's desire to see its children, like those of fellow immigrant groups and the English community, educated in the majority language of Canada rather than the language of an insular minority clashed directly with Quebec francophones' emergent self-image as a majority community within Quebec rather than a national minority within Canada. With birth-rates declining dramatically, French Quebecers wished to tap into immigration to maintain their share of the population and the government set its sights on the Italian community, leading to the Saint-Leonard Conflict in which the Italian community sought to maintain freedom of choice in education in the face of the government's demands that they send their children to French-language schools. The Government of Quebec intended to allow English-language schooling only for Quebec's "historical English minority", a move which the Italian community viewed as discriminatory. The matter was eventually settled with the advent of Bill 101, which allowed anyone who arrived before 1976 to continue school in the language of their choice while requiring all new immigrants from outside Quebec (including English-speaking Canadians) to attend school in French; this last requirement, the so-called Quebec clause was eventually struck down by the Supreme Court and expanded to allow anyone who received the better part of their schooling in English in Canada to send their children to English school in Quebec (in practice, this complex formula was designed so as not to bestow a right to English education on anyone who was educated in an English-speaking country and later became a Canadian citizen).

Because of these developments, Montreal's English-speaking community today includes people of English and Commonwealth ancestry, as well as specific groups who arrived in waves before the advent of Bill 101. It is a highly diverse community, with many members having a complex and multi-layered identity that does not easily conform to the Government's definitions of "anglophone," "allophone," and "francophone."

The community is served by one daily newspaper, The Gazette, as well as a number of weeklies including The Suburban. Another major daily, the Montreal Star, was Canada's foremost English-language daily until it ceased publication in 1979 due to a labour dispute. The most-watched television news channel is CTV Montreal, formerly CFCF 12, and the community is also served by local desks at the CBC, Global, Citytv, and MaTV.

The English-speaking community in Montreal has traditionally been very pro-active in building up institutions in the areas of education and healthcare, most notably McGill and Concordia Universities and the McGill University Health Centre. With the advent of Bill 101, which made French the sole language of work, these institutions came to play a key role in maintaining the vitality and viability of the English-speaking community. Alliance Quebec, an advocacy group created to give voice to the concerns of the English-speaking community in the turbulent times following the election of the Parti Québécois in 1976, fought to give English-speakers the right to work as well. In a compromise, the government made provisions in Bill 101 for so-called "bilingual institutions", namely school boards, colleges and universities, and hospitals serving primarily the English-speaking community, which would be required only to ensure the provision of services in French without having to operate entirely in French as otherwise required by Bill 101. In effect, this allowed English speakers to maintain access to the workforce by giving them non-client-facing jobs, so long as the organization could still provide services in French. Because of this historical development, English-speaking Montrealers' identity is deeply entwined with the community's historical institutions. Along similar lines, the Jewish General Hospital was founded by the largely-English speaking Jewish Community to provide jobs and ensure quality healthcare for the Jewish community (notably whilst serving any and all, regardless of race, religion, or creed) at a time when Jews were routinely excluded from the medical profession and discriminated against as patients within a denominational healthcare system.

Prominent venues in Montreal's English-speaking community include the Centaur Theatre and the Segal Centre for Performing Arts. Notable English-speaking Montrealers include Oliver Jones, Leonard Cohen, Oscar Peterson, William Shatner, Nick Auf der Maur, Melissa Auf der Maur, Mike Bossy, and Mordecai Richler.

The English-speaking community in Montreal is geographically fragmented along its diverse ethnic lines, with much of the English-speaking population concentrated in the suburban communities of the West Island. Traditionally, the city of Westmount and Montreal's Golden Square Mile were the home of the wealthy English merchant class. Other wealthy, largely English-speaking suburbs include the towns of Hampstead and Mount Royal, as well as the more middle class city of Côte-Saint-Luc, which is traditionally associated with the city's Jewish community. The working-class Irish community was associated with the rough neighborhoods of Pointe-Saint-Charles, Verdun and Saint-Henri, which continue to host successive waves of immigrant groups as they arrive and eventually spread throughout the city. Saint Laurent Boulevard is the traditional dividing line between the so-called Two Solitudes, with the English-speaking community to the West and the French-speaking community to the East, although these lines continue to blur. Along its length, St. Laurent (also known as "The Main") has hosted a wide variety of groups that eventually came to form the city's English-speaking community, from Chinatown in the South, through Little Portugal, where Leonard Cohen had his house, and into the Mile End, which housed the Jewish community upon its first arrival and also contained numerous factories in the Schmata Industry, as described by Mordecai Richler in his work, St. Urbain's Horseman. The Greek community settled further up The Main near Outremont and the Park Extension neighbourhood near Jean Talon Street (an area which today boasts a large South Asian community), while the Italian community settled first into the neighbourhood of Ahuntsic and later, St. Leonard, Montreal North, and Riviere des Prairies.

All of these groups have English as their first language of use and may partake in the English-language or other minority school systems, but they also maintain separate cultural traditions and institutions and often operate in French at work, making it difficult to pinpoint exactly where the boundaries of Montreal's English-speaking community lie. Montreal's English-speaking population became more diverse in the 20th century. Jewish migrants from Eastern Europe arrived in large numbers in the late 19th century, followed by Italians, both groups largely aligning with the English-speaking community. Less numerous, but also important, were the many black, Chinese and South Asian migrants who increased the visible minority proportion of anglophones; today, 24.2 per cent of anglophones are visible minorities. Moreover, most anglophones in Quebec are now of non-English origin.

===== Italians =====
Montreal's Italian community is one of the largest in Canada, second only to Toronto. With 250,000 residents of Italian ancestry, Montreal has many Italian districts, such as Little Italy, Saint-Leonard (Città Italiana), R.D.P., and LaSalle. Italian is the 3rd most spoken language in Montreal and in the province of Quebec.

===== Greeks =====
Greek is the eighth language in importance. The Greek community remains vibrant: several neighbourhoods contain a number of Greek-owned businesses and local festivals and churches add to the multicultural character of the city. The neighbouring city of Laval also has a sizable Greek community, predominantly residing in the borough of Chomedey.

===== Eastern Europeans =====
In 1931 the largest non-French, non-British ethnic group was the Poles in St. Eusebe and St. Gabriel, the Czecho-Slovaks in Cremazie, the Lithuanians in St. Marie, and the Finns in St. Georges.

===== Jews =====
Montreal's Jewish community is one of the oldest and most populous in the country, formerly first but now second to Toronto and numbering about 100,000 according to the 2001 census. The community is quite diverse, and is composed of many different Jewish ethnic divisions that arrived in Canada at different periods of time and under differing circumstances.

As of 2021, Jews comprised 2.4% of the Greater Montreal population.

==== Middle Eastern ====
According to CH (Montreal's multicultural channel) there are now over 117,000 people of Arab origin in Montreal. Montreal has sizable communities of Lebanese, Palestinian and Egyptian origin. The main Arab district is the borough of Saint-Laurent, which contains an Arab population of about 32,000 (52 percent of the population).

In 1931 the Lebanese were the largest non-French and non-British ethnic group in Ville Marie.

===== Lebanese =====
According to the 2011 Census there were 190,275 Canadians who claimed Lebanese ancestry, with the largest concentration in Montreal, making them by far the largest group of people with Arabic-speaking roots.

===== Moroccans =====
As of the 2001 Canadian Census there were over 16,000 Canadians of Moroccan descent in Montreal, about 75% of the total Moroccan population of Canada.

===== Armenian =====
L'École Arménienne Sourp Hagop

As of 2005 there were almost 30,000 ethnic Armenians in Montreal. The Armenians first settled Canada in 1880. The first Armenian community in Montreal originally had 225 people.

There are Armenian community institutions such as schools, youth organizations, and churches. The authors of "The Chameleon Character of Multilingual Literacy Portraits: Researching in "Heritage" Language Places and Spaces" wrote that in Montreal "there is no recognizable materially bounded Armenian neighborhood"; however, there are three Armenian schools in Montreal, as well as an AGBU Centre located in Ville Saint-Laurent and the Armenian Community Centre of Montréal, located in Ahuntsic-Cartierville.

===== Berbers =====
Especially from Algeria and Morocco, this immigration is recent and almost 90,000 Berbers live in Montreal.

==== Caribbean ====
Additional West Indian women, from both the Francophone and Anglophone Caribbean, came to Montreal after the Domestic Immigration Program of 1955 was established. Most settled in Little Burgundy.

===== Haitian =====
Montreal's Haitian community of 100,000 people is the largest in Canada. Large percentages of Haitians live in Montréal-Nord, Saint-Michel and R.D.P. Today, Haitian Creole is the sixth most spoken language in Montreal and the seventh most spoken language in the province of Quebec.

==== Latin American ====
Montreal is host to the second largest Latin American community in Canada at 75,400 (Toronto ranks first, with 99,290), but amongst major Canadian cities, has the highest Latin American concentration at 4.1% in comparison to Toronto's Latin American concentration of 2.9% as well as the highest concentration amongst major Canadian metro areas at 2.7% to Toronto GMA's 2.3% as of 2016. The majority of Latin American Canadians are recent immigrants arriving in the late 20th century who have come from El Salvador, Colombia, Mexico, Chile and Guatemala with relatively smaller communities from the Dominican Republic, Cuba, Venezuela, Nicaragua and Ecuador. Spanish is currently the fifth most spoken language in Montreal.

On the other hand, the city is also home to 4,425 Brazilians who are part of the Portuguese-speaking community of Montreal.

==== South Asian ====
The term Indo-Canadian is typically used in Canada to refer to people from the many ethnic groups of the Republic of India, and other South Asian countries including Bangladesh, Pakistan, and Sri Lanka. Sometimes you will also hear the term 'East Indian.' As of 1985 there were 9,000 Sikhs in the Montreal area. Around 35 of Air India Flight 182's passengers were Sikhs from Greater Montreal. A memorial to AI182, located in Lachine, Montreal, opened in 2010.

==== East & Southeast Asian ====
===== Chinese =====
As of 2006 Montreal has Canada's third largest ethnic Chinese population at 72,000 members. As of 2005 there is an estimate of 42,765 ethnic Chinese in Montreal. Of the ethnic minorities, the Chinese are the fourth largest. National origins include Hong Kong, Taiwan, Southeast Asia, and Singapore.

The South Shore suburb of Brossard in particular has a high ethnic Chinese population, at 12% of its population. Montreal also has a small Chinatown sandwiched in between Old Montreal, the Quartier international and downtown.

As of 2005 Sinoquebec is the newest Chinese-language newspaper in Montreal. Others are Les Presses Chinoises and Sept Days.

Several Chinese-language special schools are in Montreal. The Montreal Chinese Hospital is located in the city.

===== Japanese =====
As of 2005 there were an estimated 2,360 ethnic Japanese in Montreal. As of 2003 there was no particular place where ethnic Japanese were concentrated, E. Bourgault wrote in Perspectives on the Japanese Canadian Experience in Quebec (Repartir à zéro: Perspectives sur l'expérience des Canadiens d'origine japonaise au Québec) that Japanese in Montreal historically "lived relatively anonymously" and that they "have avoided visible concentration as a collective, hoping to blend in, unnoticed into the larger population."

===== Cambodians =====
As of 1999 the Communauté Khmere du Canada (Khmer Community Association) and the Pagode Khmer du Canada (Khmer Buddhist Temple) cooperate with one another.

Some Muslim Cham people also moved to Montreal.

As of 1999 in Montreal duan chee give active help in resolving emotional issues with Khmer women, while this is not the case with duan chee in Toronto.

== Language ==
Census tracts in Montreal identified by mother tongue language. Francophone (majority) Francophone (minority) Anglophone (majority) Anglophone (minority) Allophone (majority) Allophone (minority)

=== Greater Montreal ===
In terms of mother language (first language learned), the 2006 census reported that in the Greater Montreal Area, 66.5% spoke French as a first language, followed by English at 13.2%, while 0.8% spoke both as a first language. The remaining 22.5% of Montreal-area residents are allophones, speaking languages including Italian (3.5%), Arabic (3.1%), Spanish (2.6%), Haitian Creole (1.3%), Chinese (1.2%), Greek (1.2%), Portuguese (0.8%), Romanian (0.7%), Vietnamese (0.7%), and Russian (0.5%). In terms of additional languages spoken, a unique feature of Montreal among Canadian cities, noted by Statistics Canada, is the working knowledge of both French and English possessed by most of its residents.

Canada Census Mother Tongue - Greater Montreal, Quebec
Census	Total	French		English		French & English		Other	
Year	Responses	Count	Pop %	Count	Pop %	Count	Pop %	Count	Pop %
2021	4,246,060	2,543,265	59.89%	474,735	11.18%	81,470	1.9%	990,820	23.33%
2016	4,053,355	2,551,955	62.96%	444,955	10.97%	47,150	1.16%	910,605	22.47%
2011	3,785,915	2,395,525	63.27%	439,845	11.62%	40,400	1.07%	832,245	21.98%
2006	3,588,520	2,328,400	64.88%	425,635	11.86%	26,855	0.75%	807,630	22.5%
2001	3,380,645	2,275,035	67.29%	408,185	12.1%	29,935	0.89%	667,485	19.74%
1996	3,287,645	2,204,285	67.04%	426,600	12.9%	30,550	0.9%	581,450	17.68%
1991	3,127,245	2,093,395	66.94%	445,515	14.2%	53,140	1.6%	456,670	14.6%
1986	2,921,357	1,974,115	67.76%	433,095	14.82%	88,585	3.03%	344,970	11.8%
1981	2,828,349	1,936,200	68.24%	520,485	18.3%	n/a	n/a	n/a	n/a

Language most spoken at home in the Montreal metropolitan area (CMA)
Language	2006	2011	2016	2021
French	70.5%	70.4%	68.3%	65.7%
English	14.9%	14.0%	13.4%	13.8%
Other language	14.6%	16.6%	18.3%	20.5%
Note that percentages add up to more than 100% because some people speak two or more languages at home.

Mother tongue languages (2006) Includes Multiple Responses
Language	Greater Montreal	Quebec	Canada
French	65.8%	79.7%	22.0%
English	13.2%	9.0%	58.6%
Arabic	3.9%	2.1%	1.1%
Spanish	3.1%	1.8%	1.3%
Italian	3.1%	1.6%	1.3%
Creole	1.5%	0.8%	0.2%
Greek	1.1%	0.5%	0.4%
Chinese	1.1%	0.6%	1.3%
Portuguese	0.8%	0.5%	0.7%
Romanian	0.7%	0.4%	0.3%
Vietnamese	0.7%	0.4%	0.5%
Russian	0.6%	0.3%	0.5%
Persian	0.5%	0.3%	0.5%
Tagalog	0.4%	0.2%	1.2%
Armenian	0.4%	0.2%	0.1%
Polish	0.4%	0.2%	0.6%
Tamil	0.4%	0.2%	0.4%
Punjabi	0.3%	0.2%	1.4%
German	0.3%	0.2%	1.3%
Bengali	0.3%	0.1%	0.2%
Cantonese	0.3%	0.1%	1.2%
Urdu	0.3%	0.1%	0.6%
Mandarin	0.3%	0.1%	0.8%

=== City of Montreal ===
Canada Census Mother Tongue – City of Montreal, Quebec
Census	Total	French		English		French and English		Other	
Year	Responses	Count	Pop %	Count	Pop %	Count	Pop %	Count	Pop %
2021	1,760,342	848,848	48.23%	270,160	15.35%	18,128	1.03%	621,984	35.34%
2016	1,680,910	833,280	49.57%	208,140	12.38%	20,705	1.27%	559,035	34.34%
2011	1,627,945	818,970	50.3%	206,210	12.67%	17,430	1.07%	536,560	32.30%
2006	1,593,725	834,520	52.36%	200,000	12.5%	12,055	0.75%	547,150	34.33%
2001	1,608,024	873,564	54.32%	206,025	12.81%	16,807	1.04%	484,165	30.1%
1996	1,569,437	855,780	54.53%	215,100	13.7%	14,740	0.94%	425,725	27.12%

FR is when French exceeds 2/3; Diverse (DV) is French and English are 1/3 to 2/3, EN is when English is over 2/3.

Top 30 languages Montréal, 2016	Population	%	Prefer French	Prefer English	Domonance
French	833,280	52.1	100.00	0.00	FR
English	208,140	13.0	0.00	100.00	EN
Allophone	515,250	32.0	36.67	63.33	DV
Arabic	95,165	5.9	50.19	49.81	DV
Spanish	72,760	4.5	33.08	66.92	EN
Italian	67,800	4.2	34.32	65.68	DV
Creole	36,160	2.3	67.06	32.94	FR
Mandarin	26,245	1.6	19.56	80.44	EN
Vietnamese	18,115	1.1	44.89	55.11	DV
Kabyle	17,895	1.1	62.88	37.12	DV
Portuguese	17,130	1.1	33.84	66.16	DV
Greek	16,935	1.1	29.72	70.28	EN
Romanian	15,230	1.0	39.48	60.52	DV
Russian	14,685	0.9	34.68	65.32	DV
Cantonese	14,435	0.9	13.07	86.93	EN
Farsi	12,585	0.8	32.97	67.03	EN
Tagalog (Filipino)	10,770	0.7	16.44	83.56	EN
Tamil	9,595	0.6	18.28	81.72	EN
Bengali	9,290	0.6	15.40	84.60	EN
Panjabi (Punjabi)	7,300	0.5	10.59	89.41	EN
Polish	7,000	0.4	31.66	68.34	EN
Urdu	6,580	0.4	12.99	87.01	EN
Armenian	6,330	0.4	20.63	79.37	EN
Yiddish	6,030	0.4	9.10	90.90	EN
Khmer (Cambodian)	4,875	0.3	49.71	50.29	DV
Turkish	4,535	0.3	29.57	70.43	EN
Gujarati	4,075	0.3	19.61	80.39	EN
German	3,990	0.2	36.46	63.54	DV
Bulgarian	3,625	0.2	39.75	60.25	DV
Korean	3,120	0.2	22.73	77.27	EN
Ukrainian	2,995	0.2	25.85	74.15	EN
Total	1,556,670	100.0%	65.67%	34.33%	DV

== Religion ==
=== City of Montreal ===
Religion in the City of Montreal (2021)
1. Catholic Christianity (35.0%)
2. Christian N.O.S (6.10%)
3. Orthodox Christianity (3.20%)
4. Protestant Christianity (2.60%)
5. Other Christian (2.60%)
6. No religion (31.0%)
7. Islam (12.7%)
8. Judaism (2.10%)
9. Hinduism (1.80%)
10. Buddhism (1.50%)
11. Sikhism (0.90%)
12. Other religions (0.60%)

Largest religious affiliation in Island of Montreal by census tract based on the 2021 census

The Greater Montreal Area is predominantly Roman Catholic; however, weekly church attendance in Quebec is among the lowest in Canada. Historically Montreal has been a centre of Catholicism in North America with its numerous seminaries and churches, including the Notre-Dame Basilica, the Cathédrale Marie-Reine-du-Monde, and Saint Joseph's Oratory. Some 62.4% of the total population is Christian, largely Roman Catholic (52.8%), primarily due to descendants of original French settlers, and others of Italian and Irish origins. Protestants which include Anglican, United Church, Lutheran, owing to British and German immigration, and other denominations number 5.90%, with a further 3.7% consisting mostly of Orthodox Christians, fuelled by a large Greek population. There is also a number of Russian and Ukrainian Orthodox parishes. Islam is the largest non-Christian religious group, with 154,540 members, the second-largest concentration of Muslims in Canada at 9.6%. The Jewish community in Montreal has a population of 90,780. In cities such as Côte Saint-Luc and Hampstead, Jewish people constitute the majority, or a substantial part of the population. As recently as 1971 the Jewish community in Greater Montreal was as high as 109,480. Political and economic uncertainties led many to leave Montreal and the province of Quebec.

The religious breakdown of the population of Montreal is:

Religion (2021)
Religion	Population	Percentage (%)
Christianity	853,205	49.5%
No religious affiliation	534,180	31.0%
Islam	218,395	12.7%
Judaism	35,930	2.1%
Hinduism	30,430	1.8%
Buddhism	26,395	1.5%
Sikhism	15,630	0.9%
Other religions	9065	0.5%

=== Greater Montreal ===
Religious groups in Metro Montreal (1981−2021)
Religious group	2021		2011		2001		1991		1981	
Religious group	Pop.	%	Pop.	%	Pop.	%	Pop.	%	Pop.	%
Christianity	2,431,435	57.8%	2,790,920	74.38%	2,859,010	84.57%	2,737,050	88.55%	2,578,005	92.14%
Irreligion	1,200,090	28.53%	560,650	14.94%	258,295	7.64%	167,060	5.4%	88,650	3.17%
Islam	365,675	8.69%	221,040	5.89%	100,185	2.96%	41,215	1.33%	10,935	0.39%
Judaism	82,075	1.95%	83,200	2.22%	88,765	2.63%	96,710	3.13%	101,365	3.62%
Hinduism	45,565	1.08%	32,280	0.86%	24,075	0.71%	13,775	0.45%	6,415	0.23%
Buddhism	42,540	1.01%	47,350	1.26%	37,840	1.12%	27,905	0.9%	9,165	0.33%
Sikhism	22,990	0.55%	9,205	0.25%	7,930	0.23%	3,880	0.13%	1,555	0.06%
Indigenous spirituality	290	0.01%	200	0.01%	—N/a	—N/a	—N/a	—N/a	—N/a	—N/a
Other	15,785	0.38%	7,620	0.2%	4,550	0.13%	3,515	0.11%	1,950	0.07%
Total responses	4,206,450	98.01%	3,752,475	95.38%	3,380,645	98.67%	3,091,115	98.84%	2,798,040	98.93%
Total population	4,291,732	100%	3,934,078	100%	3,426,350	100%	3,127,242	100%	2,828,349	100%

== See also ==
- Demographics of Quebec
