= Chinatown, Montreal =

Chinatown Quartier chinois
- Neighbourhood
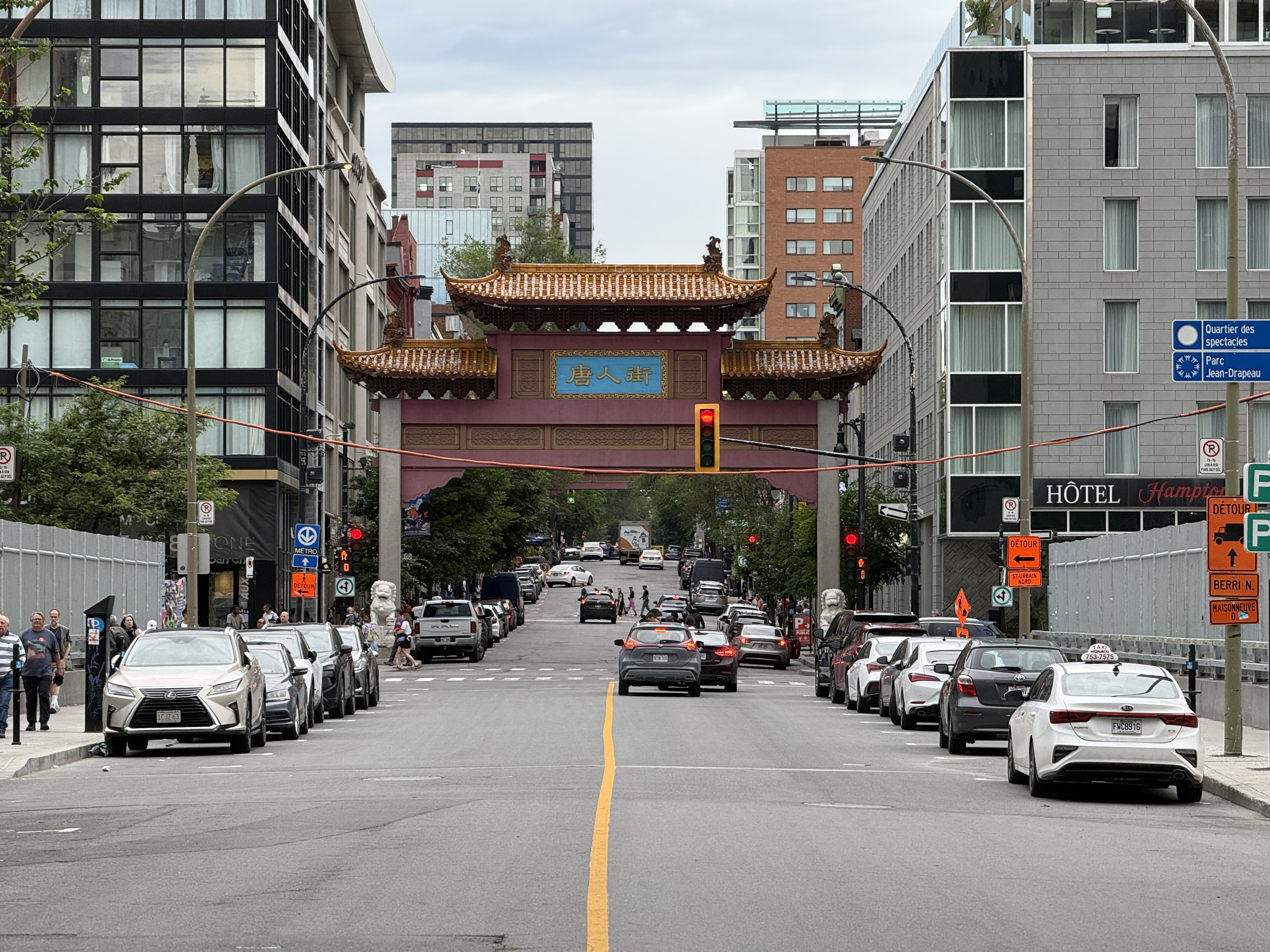
- The paifang on Saint Laurent Boulevard

- Location of Chinatown in Montreal
- Coordinates: 45.50759°N 73.5608°W
- Country: Canada
- Province: Quebec
- City: Montreal
- Borough: Ville-Marie
- Established: Early 1890s
- Elevation: 66 ft (20 m)
- Postal Code: H2Z
- Area codes: 514, 438

Chinatown, Montreal
- Simplified Chinese: 蒙特利尔唐人街
Transcriptions
Standard Mandarin
- Hanyu Pinyin: Méngtèlì'ěr Tángrénjiē
- Wade–Giles: Meng^{2}t'e^{4}li^{4}erh^{3} T'ang^{2} jen^{2} chieh^{1}
- IPA: [mə̌ŋtʰɤ̂ljɚ̂ tʰǎŋtɕə̌ntɕjé]
Yue: Cantonese
- Jyutping: Mung4dak6lei6ji5 Tong4jan4gaai1

Alternative Chinese name
- Traditional Chinese: 蒙特婁中國城
Transcriptions
Standard Mandarin
- Hanyu Pinyin: Méngtèlìlóu Zhōngguóchéng
- IPA: [mə̌ŋtʰɤ̂lǒʊ ʈʂʊ́ŋkwǒʈʂʰə̌ŋ]

Second alternative Chinese name
- Traditional Chinese: 滿地可華埠
- Simplified Chinese: 满地可华埠
Transcriptions
Yue: Cantonese
- Jyutping: mun5 dei6 ho2 waa4 fau6

Chinatown (French: Quartier chinois, pronounced [kaʁtje ʃinwa]) is a neighbourhood located in the area of De la Gauchetière Street in Montreal, Quebec, Canada. The neighbourhood contains many Asian restaurants, food markets, and convenience stores as well being home to many of Montreal's East Asian community centres, such as the Montreal Chinese Hospital and the Montreal Chinese Community and Cultural Centre.

== History ==
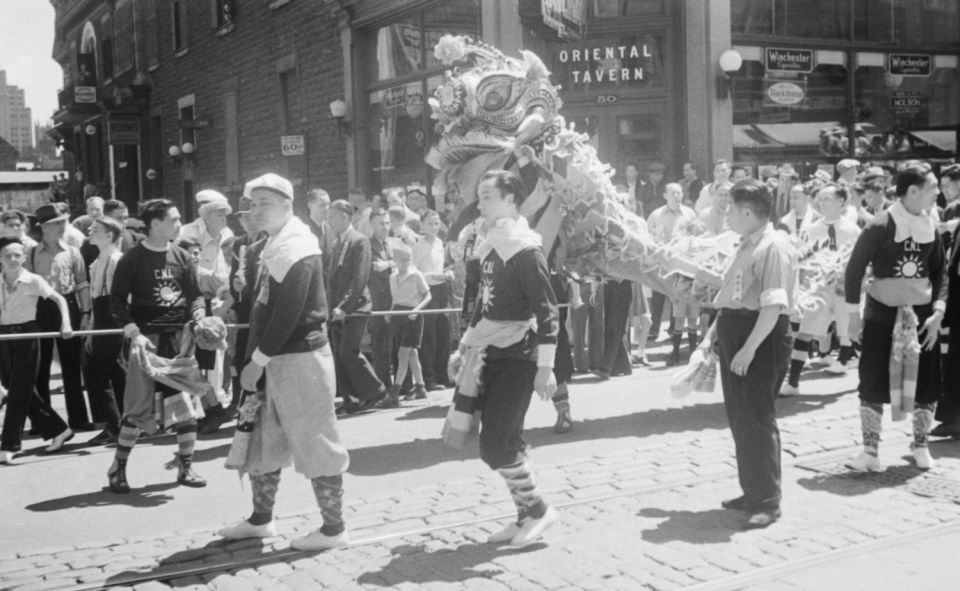
Lion dance on Clark Street in 1939

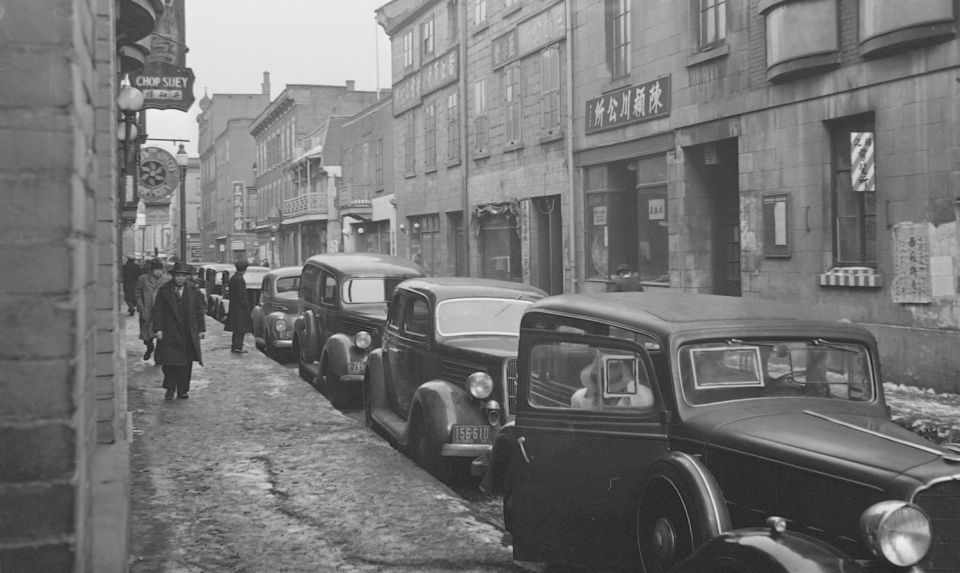
Montreal Chinatown in 1940

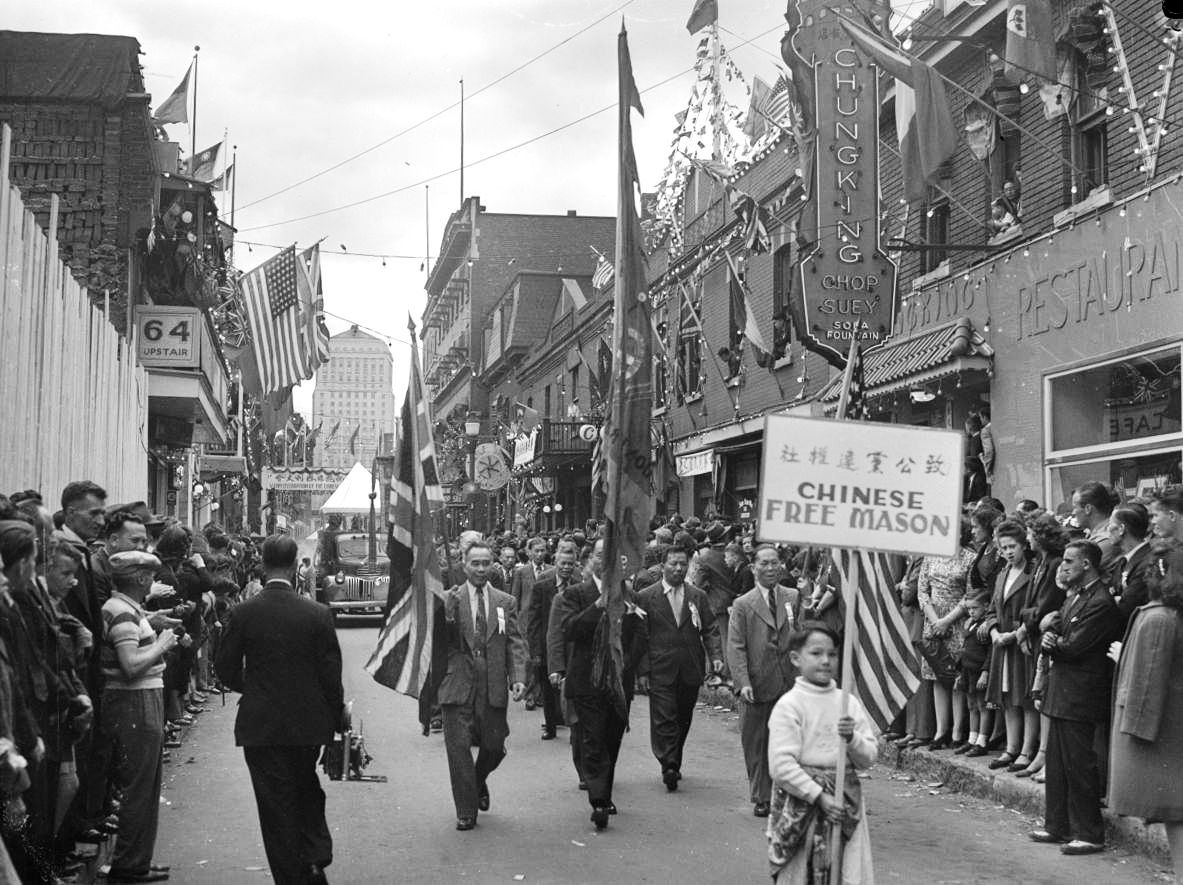
A Victoria Day parade on De la Gauchetière Street in the 1945 Montreal Chinatown with the Bell Telephone Building in the background.

=== Origins ===
The area was once home to Montreal's Jewish community, with thousands of Yiddish speaking immigrants settling in the area from 1890 to 1920, as part of a Jewish quarter centred on Saint Laurent Boulevard.

The first Chinese immigrants to Montreal arrived in March 1877. Montreal's Chinatown emerged in the 1890s and belonged to the Chan, Hom (Tam), Lee, and Wong clan groups. Many Taishan Chinese settled (all following the Leung Family) in the area because they worked for the railways and it was convenient for these occupations.

Among the first Chinese residents was Jos Song Long who opened a laundromat on Craig Street (today Saint Antoine Street). Most Chinese residents primarily spoke Toisanese, a sister language of Cantonese, and had moved from British Columbia and southern China to what had been a primarily residential area. Initially, many Chinese Montrealers ran laundromats, as owning their own businesses allowed them to avoid the pay discrimination that they had faced in British Columbia. Businesses such as laundromats required geographic proximity to its customers, and as a result, this type of business became quite common in Montreal, with Chinatown being largely commercially oriented.

In 1902, the area officially became known as "Chinatown", and specifically referred to several blocks centered on De La Gauchetière Street between Chenneville and Clark Streets. On these streets, many Chinese-owned businesses opened, notably restaurants and specialty grocers. The neighbourhood was strategically located with modest-sized lots, affordable rents and close proximity to Saint-Laurent Boulevard, which attracted non-Chinese clients.

Over the years, Hong Kongers and ethnic Chinese refugees from Vietnam also set up shops and restaurants in the area.

=== Decline ===
From the 1970s onwards Montreal's Chinatown was subject to many of the cities' redevelopment plans, reducing the size of Chinatown and its expansion. This saw to the expropriation and demolition of over 6 acres of private properties in the construction of the Complexe Guy-Favreau and a city block of Chinatown for the construction of Palais des congrès de Montréal, even as community consultation and negotiations were still on-going. Rezoning of areas east of Saint Laurent from Chinatown in the 1980s has further prevented the growth expansion of Chinatown businesses. In 2022, it was announced that Chinatown would be granted heritage status by the province to shield the neighbourhood from further negative effects brought on by development and gentrification.

== Features ==
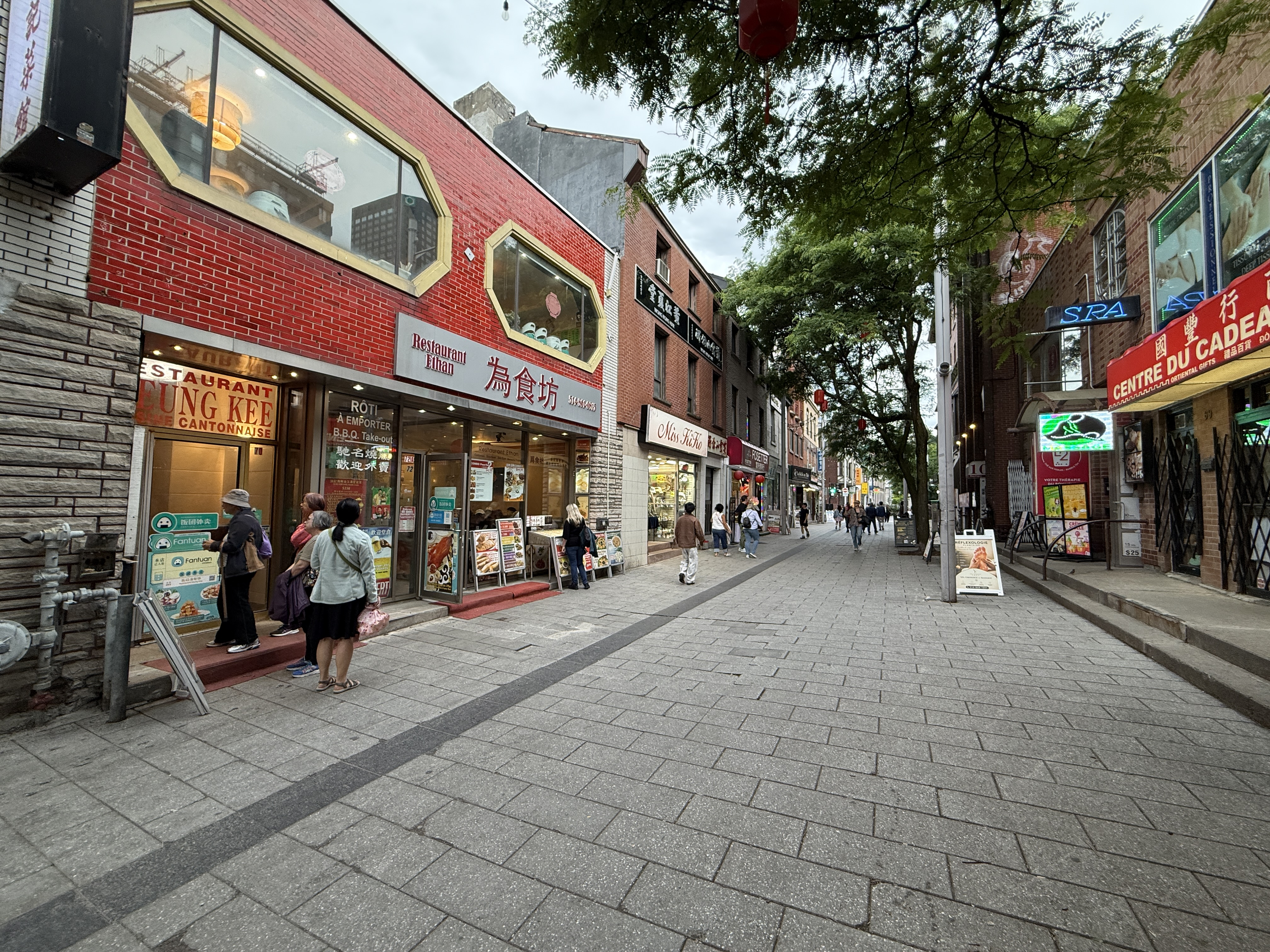
Looking down De la Gauchetière Street in Chinatown (2026)

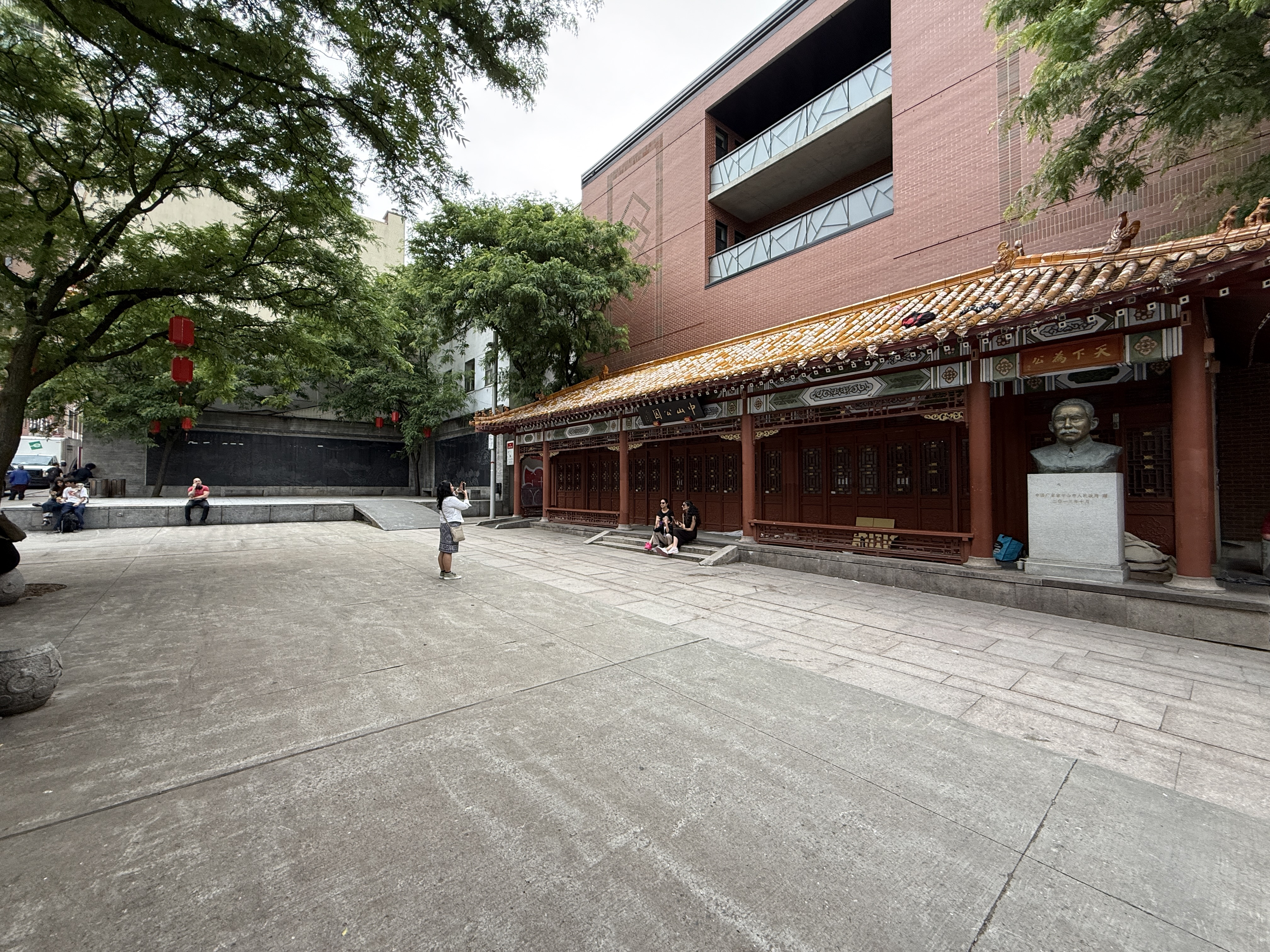
Place Sun-Yat-Sen

Much of Montreal Chinatown is located on La Gauchetière Street and around Saint Urbain Street and Saint Lawrence Boulevard (boul. Saint-Laurent), between René Lévesque Boulevard and Viger Avenue (Place-d'Armes Montreal metro station), occupying roughly the area of a city block. The part of La Gauchetière that crosses through Chinatown is a pedestrian walkway, making it more inviting for a stroll. On several weekends during the summer, the street becomes a lively outdoor fair. Prior to 1970, a significant part of Chinatown extended west to Jeannes-Mance Street.

Montreal has the most paifang of any Chinatown in Canada, with 4 gates in the:

- North: 45.508695°N 73.561272°W
- South: 45.507597°N 73.558842°W
- East: 45.508441°N 73.559692°W
- West: 45.505324°N 73.561908°W

Montreal's Chinatown is a vibrant nightspot for locals and tourists alike thanks to a special regulation by Montreal's city officials which slates the sector as a tourist area, thus allowing it to continue operations well into the evening. Cantonese seafood, barbecue and dim sum restaurants and Vietnamese Phở eateries are featured in Chinatown. Many local Asian-Canadians frequent the area since the shops offer products directly imported from Mainland China or Vietnam that are difficult to find elsewhere in town.

Aside from its economic importance in the sector, Montreal's Chinatown actively participate in numerous community activities. The offices of many Chinese newspapers, organizations and associations are located in the surrounding buildings. Moreover, the Chinatown houses the biggest Chinese school of Montreal (over 1500 students) as well as the Montreal Chinese Catholic Mission. Over the years, the Canadian government has continually sought to invest in the area by funding the construction of the Montreal Chinese Hospital and the Montreal Chinese Cultural and Community Centre.

The new CHUM hospital is partly located in Chinatown and the Quartier Latin.

Like many other Chinatowns, Montreal also has the annual Miss Chinese Montreal Pageant, where the winner goes on to compete at the Miss Chinese International Pageant, which is usually held in Hong Kong or in mainland China.

== Media ==
Chinatown was the filming location of the 2008 film release Punisher: War Zone. Some parts of Chinatown were redressed with English-language signage to recreate the atmosphere of Chinatown, Manhattan.

There are Four Chinese language weekly newspapers operating in Montreal: La Grande Époque Montréal, Les Presses Chinoises, Sept Days, and the Luby.

== Other Chinese areas ==
=== Chinatown West ===
A new Chinatown has begun to develop in the area west of Concordia University in the last fifteen years, particularly along Sainte Catherine Street between Guy Street and Greene Avenue. It caters primarily to the growing mainland Chinese and East Asian student and immigrant population in the area. As of 2006, 22.9% of the area's population were of Chinese origin. The area is commonly known as the "Concordia Ghetto", similar to the "McGill Ghetto" found in Milton Park, a student neighborhood located directly east of McGill.

=== Brossard ===
Various Asian-themed malls have arisen along Taschereau Boulevard in the south shore suburb of Brossard, where a significant portion of the population is of Chinese origin (14% of population, 33% of visible minorities). The provincial government of Quebec enticed Hong Kong millionaires to settle and invest in the province, particularly in Brossard. The shopping centres were largely funded by Hong Kong Chinese immigrant investors, some of whom have since returned to Hong Kong or have relocated to larger Chinese immigrant centres such as Toronto and Vancouver. A wide range of Chinese restaurants, grocers, and services can still be found in Brossard.

- Place Kim Phat

== Gallery ==
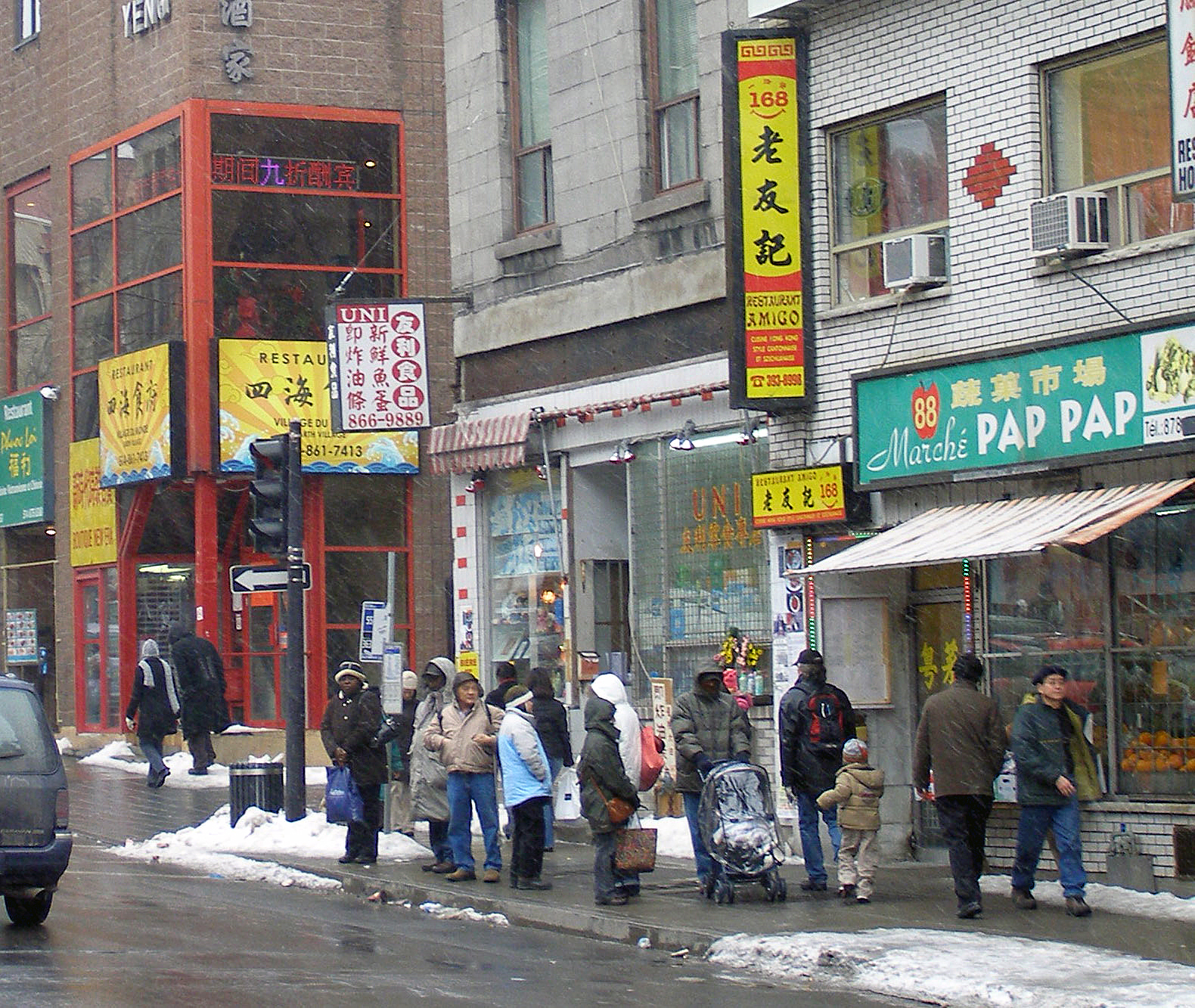
A bus stop located along Saint-Laurent Boulevard in Chinatown.

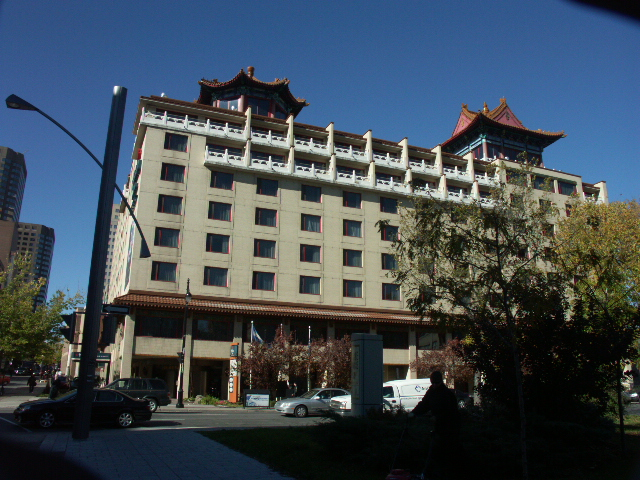
Holiday Inn hotel in Chinatown

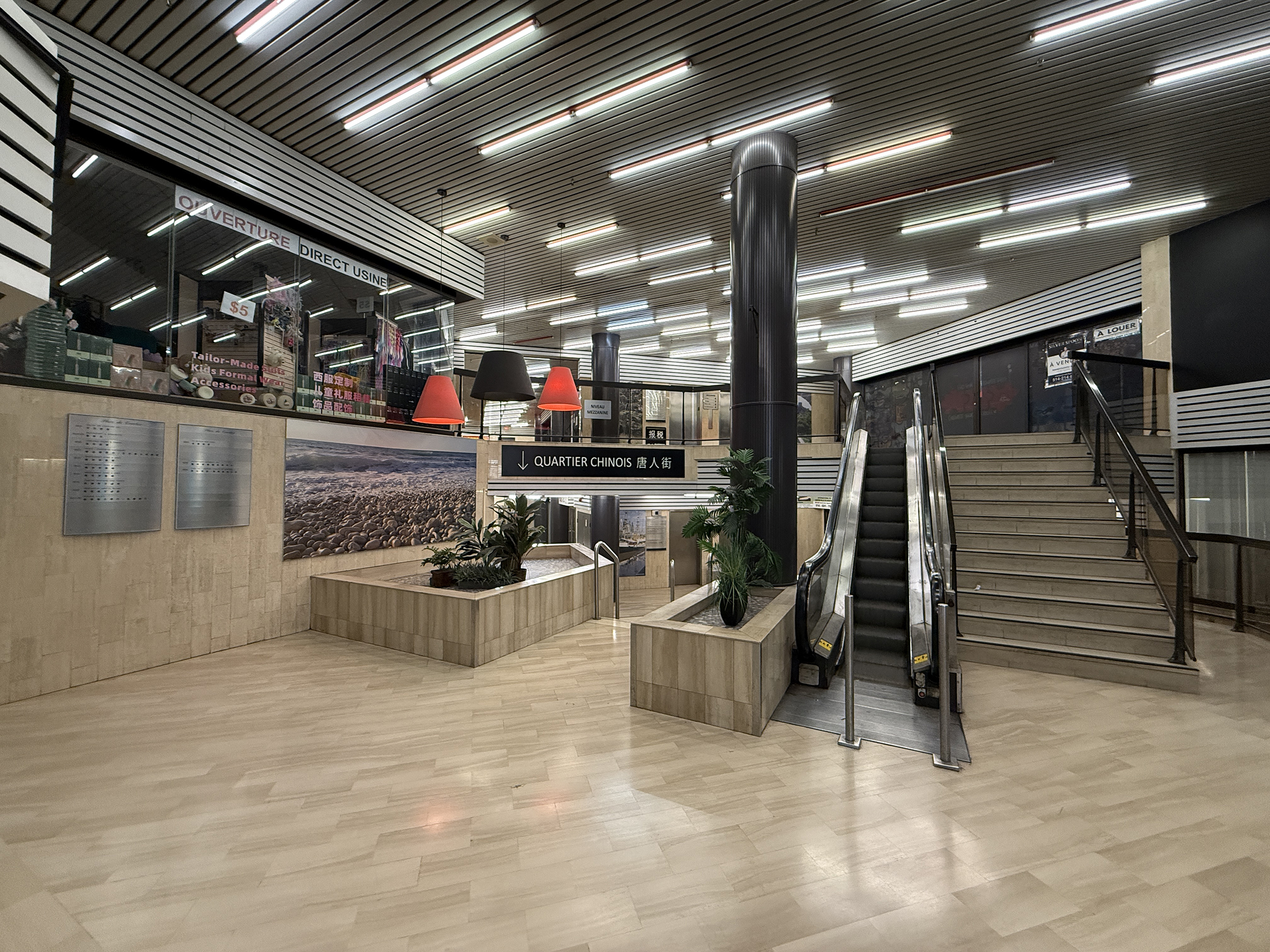
Place du Quartier is one of the mall in Chinatown

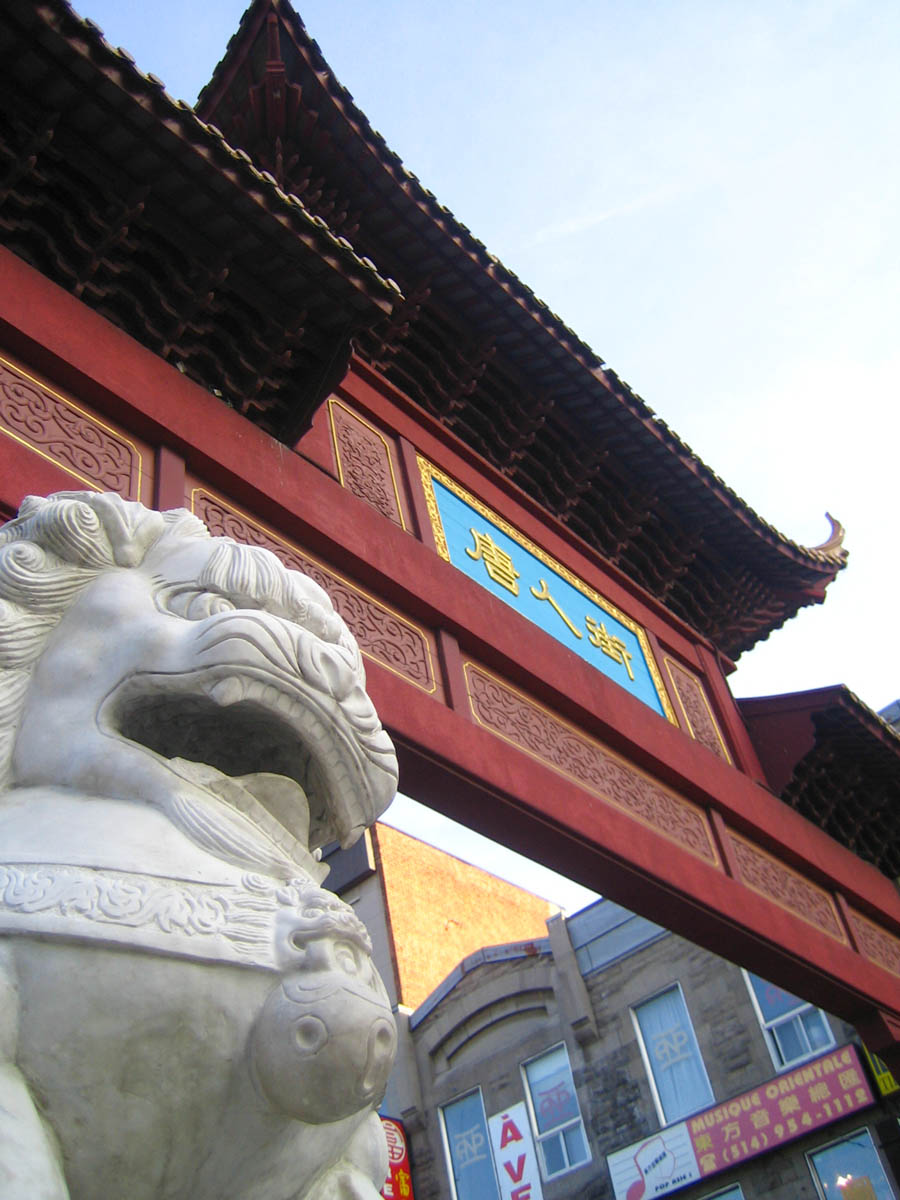
The guardian lions at the paifang

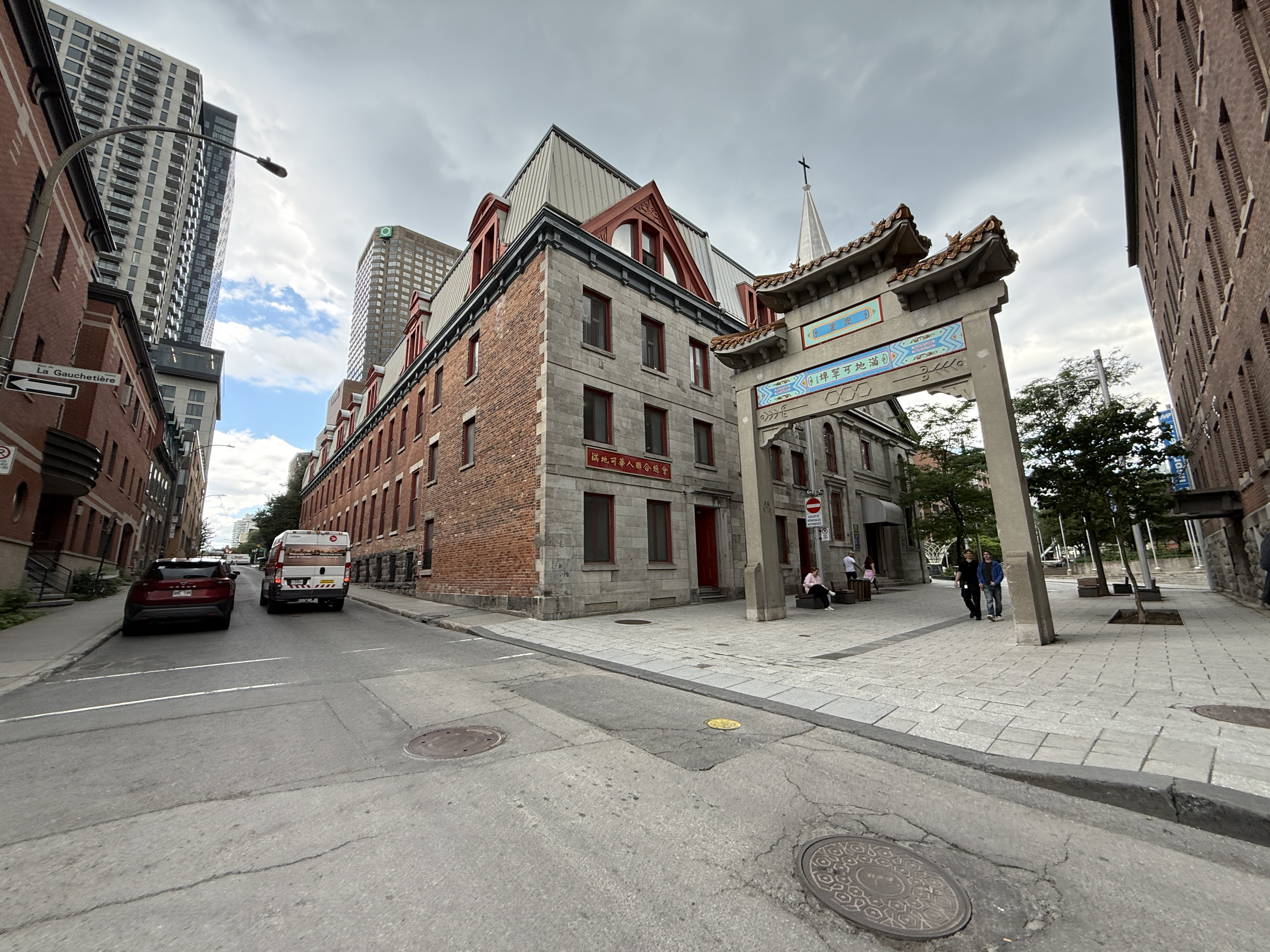
Chinatown Gate at Rue Jeanne Mance

== See also ==
- List of restaurant districts and streets
