= Nena Eng-Tan =

Filipino obstetrician-gynecologist and medical administrator

- Born: Nena Raca Eng; November 18, 1925; Vigan, Ilocos Norte, Insular Government of the Philippine Islands
- Died: July 31, 2025 (aged 99); Quezon City, Metro Manila, the Philippines
- Education: University of Santo Tomas (MD)
- Occupations: Physician; medical administrator
- Years active: 1958–2024
- Known for: Leadership in Philippine medical organizations
- Spouse: Francisco "Kiko" Y. Tan Sr.
- Children: 5

Nena Eng-Tan (née Raca; November 18, 1925 – July 31, 2025) was a Filipino obstetrician-gynecologist and medical administrator who held leadership positions in several Philippine medical organizations. She was president of the Philippine Medical Women's Association (PMWA) from 1985 to 1986, president of the Philippine Medical Association (PMA) from 1987 to 1988, and president of the Philippine Obstetrical and Gynecological Society (POGS) in 1996. She later served as president of the Philippine Section of the International College of Surgeons.

Eng-Tan graduated from the University of Santo Tomas Faculty of Medicine and Surgery in 1952 and had a lengthy association with the Chinese General Hospital and Medical Center, which recognized her in 2024 for 66 years of service in its Department of Obstetrics and Gynecology. She and her husband, physician Francisco "Kiko" Tan, were also founders of Novaliches General Hospital, subsequently known as NovaGen.

In 2003, Eng-Tan received the International Federation of Gynecology and Obstetrics (FIGO) Award in Recognition of Women Obstetricians/Gynaecologists as the recipient from the Philippines.

== Education and medical career ==
Eng-Tan studied medicine at the University of Santo Tomas Faculty of Medicine and Surgery, receiving her Doctor of Medicine degree in 1952.

She specialized in obstetrics and gynaecology. Eng-Tan became affiliated with the Chinese General Hospital and Medical Center in Manila, where she practiced in the Department of Obstetrics and Gynecology. During the hospital's Doctors' Night in 2024, she was recognized for 66 years of service to the department.

Eng-Tan and her husband, physician Francisco "Kiko" Tan, founded Novaliches General Hospital. According to the hospital's institutional history, construction of the hospital began in 1996. The institution was later renamed NovaGen.

Eng-Tan was also involved in medical and nursing education. A 2009 directory of Philippine higher education institutions listed her as president of NovaGen College of Quezon City, a private educational institution in Novaliches offering a Bachelor of Science in Nursing program.

== Medical organization leadership ==
=== Philippine Medical Women's Association ===
Eng-Tan served as president of the Philippine Medical Women's Association from 1985 to 1986. She succeeded Teresita L. Tongson and was succeeded by Iva Cruel-Anastacio.

The PMWA is a national organization of women physicians in the Philippines. Eng-Tan's presidency preceded her election to the leadership of the Philippine Medical Association.

=== Philippine Medical Association ===
Eng-Tan served as president of the Philippine Medical Association for the 1987–1988 term. She succeeded Fe Canlas-Dizon and was succeeded by Santiago A. Del Rosario.

During her presidency, Eng-Tan renewed an earlier proposal for a joint scientific meeting between the Philippine Medical Association and the Association of Philippine Practicing Physicians in America (APPA). A retrospective account published by the PMA states that the proposal had previously been discussed by the organizations and that Eng-Tan revived the initiative in 1987 following renewed activity within APPA.

The proposed meeting did not immediately proceed because of financial requirements and work associated with the establishment of the PMA Library and Archives. The organizations subsequently developed a continuing program of joint scientific conventions.

Eng-Tan continued to participate in PMA activities after completing her term. In 2015, she was among the former presidents recognized during the association's 112th foundation anniversary.

=== Philippine Obstetrical and Gynecological Society ===
Eng-Tan served as president of the Philippine Obstetrical and Gynecological Society in 1996. She succeeded Walfrido W. Sumpaico and was succeeded by Delfin A. Tan.

Her leadership of POGS followed her presidencies of the Philippine Medical Women's Association and the Philippine Medical Association.

=== International College of Surgeons ===
Eng-Tan was active in the Philippine Section of the International College of Surgeons. An institutional history of the section records her induction as section president during the 15th Joint Congress of the International College of Surgeons Asia Pacific Federation. The congress was held at the Manila Hotel in February 2004.

== Awards and recognition ==
In March 2003, Pilipino Star Ngayon reported that Eng-Tan was among a group of Filipino women recognized during an International Women's Day event at Club Filipino. The newspaper described Eng-Tan as an obstetrician-gynecologist and listed her among recipients of recognition during the event. Other honorees included forensic pathologist Raquel Fortun, business executive Teresita Sy-Coson, and provincial governors Josie dela Cruz and Rebecca Ynares.

In 2003, Eng-Tan was the Philippine recipient of the FIGO Award in Recognition of Women Obstetricians/Gynaecologists, conferred by the International Federation of Gynecology and Obstetrics. FIGO's historical roster of recipients lists Eng-Tan among the women recognized at its 2003 congress.

In 2024, the Chinese General Hospital and Medical Center recognized Eng-Tan for 66 years of service in its Department of Obstetrics and Gynecology.

== Personal life ==
Eng-Tan was married to physician Francisco "Kiko" Tan. According to the institutional history of NovaGen, the couple had five children, all of whom entered medical specialties. Eng-Tan and her husband established Novaliches General Hospital, which later became NovaGen.

== Death ==
Eng-Tan died on July 31, 2024. On August 1, 2024, the Philippine Medical Association published a notice announcing her death and commemorating her service as president of the association from 1987 to 1988.

== See also ==
- Philippine Medical Association
- Philippine Obstetrical and Gynecological Society
- Chinese General Hospital and Medical Center
- University of Santo Tomas Faculty of Medicine and Surgery
- Women in medicine
