= San Francisco Chinese Hospital =

San Francisco Chinese Hospital 東華醫院

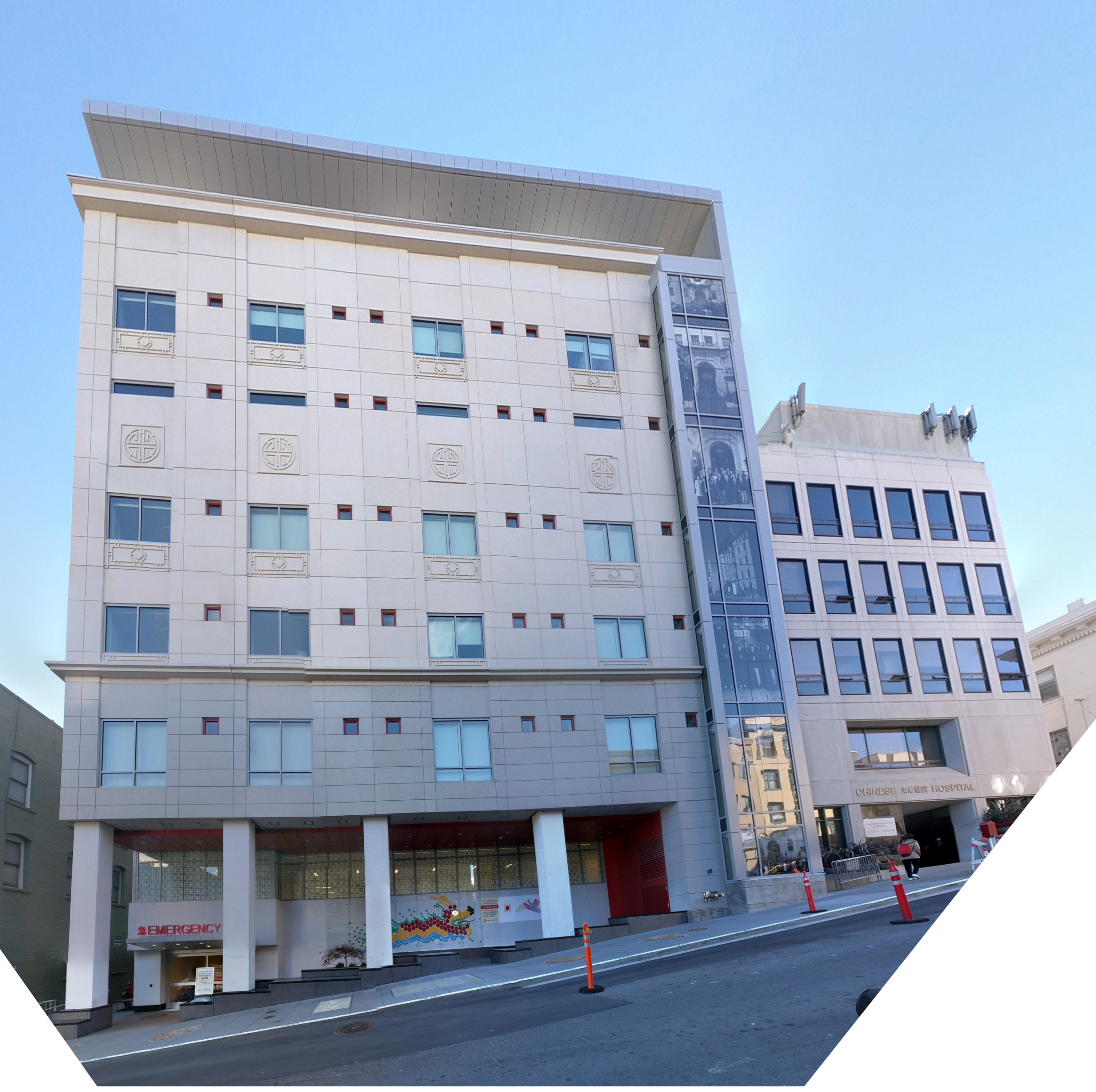
- The new patient tower and the 1979 Annex, to the right.

Geography
- Location: San Francisco, California, United States
- Coordinates: 37.79556°N 122.4092°W

Organization
- Type: General

Services
- Emergency department: Yes
- Beds: 54

History
- Founded: 1925

Links
- Website: www.chinesehospital-sf.org
- Lists: Hospitals in California
San Francisco Chinese Hospital
- Traditional Chinese: 東華醫院
- Simplified Chinese: 东华医院
Transcriptions
Standard Mandarin
- Hanyu Pinyin: Dōnghuá yīyuàn
- Wade–Giles: Tunghua i-yuan
- IPA: [tʊ́ŋxwǎ íɥɛ̂n]
Yue: Cantonese
- Yale Romanization: Dūngwàa yīyún
- Jyutping: Dung1waa4 ji1jyun2
- IPA: [tʊ́ŋwȁː jɪ́ʔy̌ːn]

San Francisco Chinese Hospital is a community hospital in San Francisco and the only Chinese hospital in the United States. The hospital is located in San Francisco's Chinatown.

Chinese Hospital primarily serves the elderly, poor and immigrants from China in the San Francisco area and provides an alternative to San Francisco General Hospital for patients with a language barrier. The hospital also operates CCHP, (Chinese Community Health Plan). The hospital's staff can provide services spoken in English, Mandarin, Cantonese, Taishanese and other languages.

== History ==
=== Origins ===
Historian Him Mark Lai cites three factors that made it difficult for early Chinese immigrants to seek medical care:

1. Many hospitals refused to treat Chinese patients
2. Most hospitals were distant from Chinatown, and prospective patients were subject to attack en route
3. Most Chinese immigrants did not have sufficient knowledge of English to communicate with American doctors

In 1888, the Chinese Hospital Association sought permission to erect a hospital in the University Mound neighborhood, but the San Francisco Board of Supervisors referred the request to the Health and Police Committee instead, based on opposition from existing property owners. Several so-called Chinese hospitals were established in San Francisco as privately run institutions of poor repute, mainly functioning as hospices and morgues, throughout the late 1800s.

Chinese Hospital traces its origins to 1899, when the Oriental Dispensary, with ties to the Tung Wah Group of Hospitals in Hong Kong, was founded over the protests of property owners on Sacramento Street. The Tung Wah Yi Kuk opened at 828 Sacramento Street, a site currently occupied by the Willie "Woo Woo" Wong/Chinese Playground. After the 1906 San Francisco earthquake and fire, it relocated to 14 Trenton Street. However, the building was small at 25 by 60 ft (7.6 by 18.3 m) and not adequate to meet community demands.

While his parents were touring the United States as part of a Chinese Opera Troupe, actor and martial artist Bruce Lee, Lee Jun-fan, was born at Chinese Hospital on November 27, 1940.

=== 1924 and 1979 buildings ===
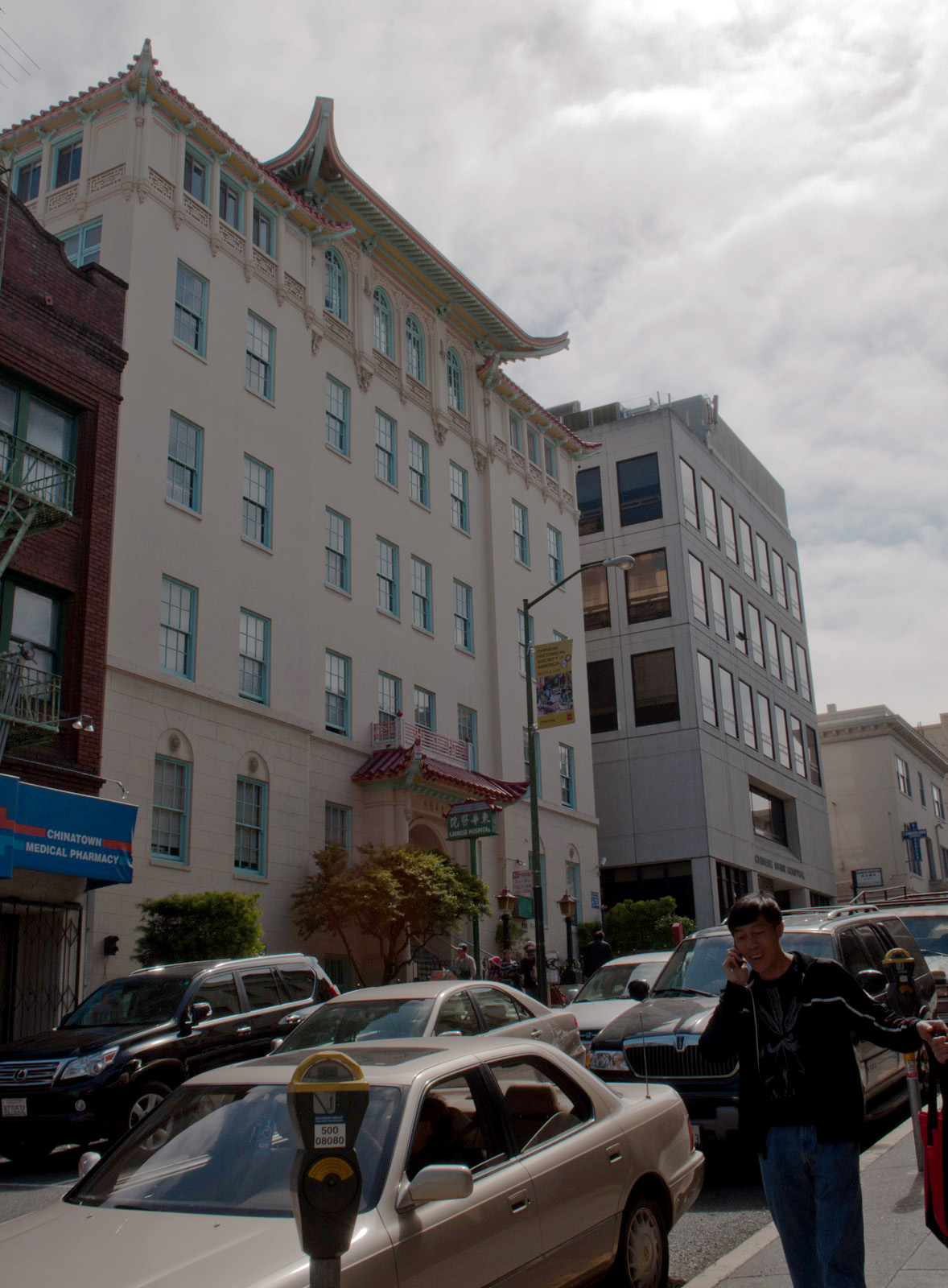
The facade of the now-demolished 1924 hospital. The 1979 annex stands uphill.

A site was acquired to expand the existing dispensary on Trenton in 1920, and the Chinese Six Companies convened a meeting of 15 community organizations, who boldly decided to build a modern hospital instead, which would require extensive fundraising; the 15 organizations met again in October 1922, forming the hospital's Board of Trustees, and acquired the land where the present-day hospital stands in August 1923 for US$10,500 (equivalent to $200,000 in 2025). From 1923, Chinese immigrants in the Bay Area contributed $145,000 towards the construction, and the goal of $200,000 was reached by early 1925. The modern Chinese hospital, in concrete and steel, with a touch of Oriental style in the roof lines, was completed at 835 Jackson St. in 1924 and opened on April 18, 1925., followed on April 29 by a huge Chinatown celebration that would last for nine days.

By the early 1970s, the original building did not meet earthquake and fire standards established in 1947, and income (mainly derived from rental properties in Chinatown) was not adequate to provide sufficient funds to improve it. A new annex was built in 1979 at 845 Jackson Street, housing 54 beds. With the opening of the 1979 hospital annex, the original 1924 building was converted to a Medical Administration Building.

=== 2012 expansion ===
In 2012, Chinese Hospital announced plans to build a replacement hospital building in the space where the 1924 building currently stood. The new building would take over patient care from the 1979 building, and the 1924 building would be demolished as it was seismically unsafe. The plans were approved and the 1924 building was demolished, despite significant opposition by the National Trust for Historic Preservation (NTHP). The NTHP commemorated the 1924 building as one of ten historic sites lost in 2013. There was a 41-space parking garage behind the 1924 building which was also demolished to make room for the new building.

As of September 2016, the new eight-story, $180 million building called the Patient Tower was set to officially open. The replacement hospital building was planned to have 54 beds and add a new 22-bed skilled nursing facility; the 1979 building would be converted to serve as a Medical Administration and Outpatient Center. Fundraising for the project was spearheaded by Rose Pak, a Chinese American activist who died September 18, 2016.

== Operations ==
The hospital has been operating at approximately one-third of its 52-bed capacity since opening the Patient Tower, and Chinese Hospital sustained a $17.4 million operating loss in 2016. According to the hospital's CEO, Brenda Yee, "reduced support from the community physicians" has resulted in fewer admissions.

The non-profit Chinese Hospital, the Chinese Community Health Care Association (CCHCA, a group of physicians), and the Chinese Community Health Plan (CCHP, a for-profit insurer) have been allied since 1982 to provide an integrated health network in Chinatown. CCHCA negotiated contracts on behalf of its physicians, but in July 2015, CCHP began sending contracts directly to doctors, sparking a lawsuit by CCHCA against CCHP in August 2015. Yee, who heads both CCHP and Chinese Hospital, stated that CCHP was free to contract directly with doctors. CCHCA stated the hospital had cut them out of a mutually beneficial profit-sharing arrangement.

== Leadership ==
Chinese Hospital is governed by a Board of Trustees, with members selected from sixteen community organizations serving Chinatown.

Chinese Hospital Board of Trustees
Role	Member	Organization
Chair	Kitman Chan	Chinese Chamber of Commerce
Vice Chair	Harvey Louie	Chinatown Y.M.C.A.
English Secretary	Thomas T. Ng	Chinese Consolidated Benevolent Association
Assistant English Secretary	Jack Sit	Kong Chow Benevolent Association (Note: One of the Chinese Six Companies associated with the Chinese Consolidated Benevolent Association)
Treasurer	Robert Wong	Chinese American Citizens Alliance (同源會)
Assistant Treasurer	Robert Chiang	Yan Wo Benevolent Association
Board Member	Gustin Ho, MD	Chinese Democratic Constitutionalist Party (民主憲政黨)
Board Member	Jack Lee Fong	Sue Hing Benevolent Association
Board Member	–	Chinese Hospital Medical Staff
Board Member	Clifton Leung	Chee Kung Tong
Board Member	Yick C. Tam	Kuomintang of China
Board Member	–	Ning Yung Benevolent Association
Board Member	Paul M. Lee	Yeong Wo Association
Board Member	–	Hop Wo Benevolent Association
Board Member	Dan Quan	Sam Yup Benevolent Association
Board Member	Dick W. Wong	Chinese Christian Union of San Francisco

== Hospital rating data ==
The HealthGrades website contains the clinical quality data for San Francisco Chinese Hospital, as of 2018. For this rating section clinical quality rating data, patient safety ratings and patient experience ratings are presented.

For inpatient conditions and procedures, there are three possible ratings: worse than expected, as expected, better than expected. For this hospital the data for this category is:

- Worse than expected - 0
- As expected - 8
- Better than expected - 1

For patient safety ratings the same three possible ratings are used. For this hospital they are"

- Worse than expected - 0
- As expected - 11
- Better than expected - 0

Percentage of patients rating this hospital as a 9 or 10 - 68%

Percentage of patients who on average rank hospitals as a 9 or 10 - 69%

== Services ==
Services provided by SFCH include:

- Surgical suites
- Intensive Care Unit
- 24-hour Treatment Center
- Same Day Surgery Unit
- Western San Francisco Community Clinic
- Clinical and Pathology Laboratories
- Imaging Services (Radiology, Nuclear Medicine, CT Scanning, Ultrasound, Mammography, etc.)
- Cardiopulmonary Unit (Cardiology, Pulmonary Function, Respiratory Therapy, Neurology, etc.)
- Pharmacy

== Famous patients ==
Actor and martial artist Bruce Lee was born at Chinese Hospital. San Francisco Board of Supervisors President Norman Yee was also born in Chinese Hospital.

== See also ==
- History of the Chinese Americans in San Francisco

Other Chinese hospitals and health care serving local Chinese communities:

- Montreal Chinese Hospital
- Yee Hong Centre for Geriatric Care - Greater Toronto Area
- Tung Wah Group of Hospitals - Hong Kong
- Chinese General Hospital and Medical Center - Manila
