= Helen Wong Lum =

American tennis player (1931–2015)

- Born: September 13, 1931
- Died: December 22, 2015 (aged 84); San Francisco, California
- Occupations: tennis player, basketball player
- Spouse: Charlie Lum
- Relatives: Willie "Woo Woo" Wong (brother)

Helen Wong Lum (September 13, 1931 – December 22, 2015) was an American tennis and basketball player who was born and raised in Chinatown, San Francisco. She was inducted into San Francisco Prep Hall of Fame in 1988 and the US Tennis Association's Northern California Hall of Fame in 1996.

== Career ==
Helen Wong grew up with her siblings near Chinese Playground, and received her first tennis racket as a donation from the local playground director. One of her siblings, Willie, nicknamed "Woo Woo", would go on to earn fame as a basketball player in the 1940s. Like her brother, Wong attended St. Mary's Chinese Catholic School and played basketball for the Chinese Saints; her teams won the Catholic youth league championships in 1947 and 1949. In an exhibition game in 1947, the Saints lost to a team from Letterman Hospital, but Wong scored 19 of the team's 34 points. In 1949, Wong scored 13 in a 17–16 victory over St. Monica's.

Wong was also an avid tennis player, winning a local junior tournament in 1949. She pursued her passion for tennis with the help of Charles Harney, who paid for her lessons for approximately a year, and Father Donal Forrester, who drove her to tournaments. In 1965, Wong was billed as the national Chinese tennis champion and won a tournament in Santa Cruz. She stopped playing tennis in her 40s after being diagnosed with lupus, but resumed playing a decade later once the disease was managed; she would go on to be ranked first nationally in the 50s, 55s, and 60s women's divisions, and won seven national senior tennis titles, including the Women's 55 Singles title in 1988.

Wong went on to earn a master's degree in counseling from the University of San Francisco and worked as an advisor and counselor at City College of San Francisco and as a physical education instructor at Galileo High School.

Wong was inducted into the San Francisco Prep Hall of Fame (for basketball, tennis, and volleyball) in 1988, and the Northern California United States Tennis Association Hall of Fame in 1996. Kathleen Yep, a professor of Asian American Studies at Pitzer College, compared her feats to those of Babe Didriksen.
