= Haitians in Montreal =

Communauté haïtienne à Montréal (French) Kominote ayisyen nan Monreyal (Haitian Creole)
- (Haiti) (Canada)

Total population
- 47,550

Languages
- French, Haitian Creole, English

Religion
- Christianity (Predominately Catholicism)

Related ethnic groups
- Black Canadians in Montreal

The Haitians in Montreal consists of Haitian migrants that have come to Montreal, as well as their descendants. As of 2021, there were 47,550 Haitians living in Montreal making it the largest foreign minority in Montreal.

== History ==
Huge numbers of Haitians migrated to Canada from 1960s to 1970s due to the dictatorship of François Duvalier. Most Haitians settled in Montreal and other places in Quebec due to both regions having French as their official language, and Montreal was the closest French-speaking city. Haitian settlement in Montreal increased about 40% between the late 1960s and the early 1970s. As of 2021, about 86,000 Haitians lived in Quebec including 48,000 of them in Montreal, making it the Canadian city with most Haitians and third most in North America after Miami and New York City. Montreal has up to 80,000 to 100,000 people of Haitian descent including second generation Haitian-Canadians and there were many community associations across the city. Haiti has a consulate in Montreal and Montreal hosts Haitian Film Festival every year. Most Haitians live in districts like Montréal-Nord and Saint-Michel. Since the beginning of the Haitian crisis and strong American deportation policy the Haitian population in Canada, especially in Montreal is expected to grow.

== See also ==
- Haitian Canadians
- Haitian community in Quebec
- Demographics of Montreal
