= San Francisco Saints =

The San Francisco Saints were a traveling amateur basketball team composed of Chinese Americans that was formed in the 1950s and entered in the Amateur Athletic Union. The team was founded by Father Donal F. Forrester, who was serving as pastor and director of St. Mary's Chinese Catholic Center/Holy Family Parish in San Francisco's Chinatown.

The Saints is one of the best known and successful Chinese teams. The team competed against Asian and Non-Asian teams all across California and the United States. One of the major competitions that the Saints participated in was the North American Chinese Basketball Association (NACBA) Invitational Tournament which was started in 1981 and celebrates continued success for over thirty years. The Saints dominated the early years of the tournament, winning 10 out of the first 11 championships.

The team is currently active and won the NACBA championship in 1998, finished 2nd in 1999 and won the championship for the 35 and Over Division in 2003. The team still competes under the Saints name with local talent in some Bay Area adult leagues.

St. Mary's Chinese Catholic Center also adopted the name of the Saints for its 3rd to 8th grade grammar school sports teams.

An offshoot of the Saints team, the San Francisco Duke, has carried the legacy of the Saints on. The Duke team has continued to compete and play in leagues and tournaments as the Saints did in years past. To honor the memory of the Saints, the San Francisco Duke team combined with some of the older Saints players to form the San Francisco Duke/Saints to participate in the 25th Annual NACBA tournament in Chicago. The combined team played well but lost to the Seattle Bladerunners in the championship.

== See also ==
- Willie "Woo Woo" Wong
