= Chinese General Hospital Colleges =

Private college in Manila, Philippines

Chinese General Hospital Colleges 中華崇仁總醫院護理及文科學院
- Type: Private, Non-Sectarian
- Established: 1921
- President: Dr. James G. Dy
- Students: More than 1,400 (AY 2022 - 2023)
- Location: 286 Blumentritt St., Santa Cruz, Manila, Metro Manila, Philippines; 14°37′30.91″N 120°59′16.57″E
- Campus: Urban
- Website: www.cghc.edu.ph
- Location in Manila Location in Metro Manila Location in Luzon Location in the Philippines

Chinese General Hospital Colleges is a medical school located in Manila, Philippines. It was established in 1921 as the Chinese General Hospital School of Nursing (CGHSN). It is owned and managed by the Philippine Chinese Charitable Association (PCCA) Inc. as a non-profit service organization. In 2012 the college began to offer courses such as Bachelor of Science in Medical Technology, BS in psychology, BS in Radiologic Technology and Diploma in Midwifery. In 2017 it opened the College of Medicine, which incorporates Traditional Chinese Medicine in its curriculum.

== History ==
The Chinese General Hospital Colleges was established in 1921 as the Chinese General Hospital School of Nursing (CGHSN). The idea was conceived by Dr. Jose Tee Han Kee, who was the Director of the Chinese General Hospital. With him were three physicians who organized the training school. The Missionary Sisters of the Immaculate Conception (M.I.C. Sisters), with mission houses in Hong Kong and Canton, China, were requested by Kee to help in starting the school. The first batch of five sisters arrived in August 1921. Praxedes Co Tui, a registered nurse from the Philippine General Hospital, was appointed as Chief Nurse and the first principal of the School of Nursing.

In 2012, the college began to offer new courses namely: BS in Medical Technology, BS in Psychology, BS in Radiologic Technology and Diploma in Midwifery.

In 2017, it opened the College of Medicine, which is the only school in the country that offers Doctor of Medicine with incorporation of Traditional Chinese Medicine in its curriculum. Also the same year, the college began to offer BS Physical Therapy and Caregiving NCII. It also established its Senior High School, initially only offering the STEM strand.

In 2022, the college began offering non-medical courses under the College of Accountancy and Entrepreneurship with two degree programs: BS in Accountancy and BS in Management Accounting, along with the Accountancy and Business Management strand in the Senior High School Department.

== See also ==
- List of universities and colleges in the Philippines
