= Chinese General Hospital and Medical Center =

Private hospital in Manila, Philippines

Chinese General Hospital
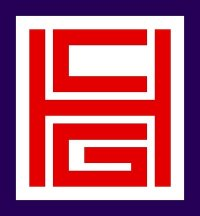

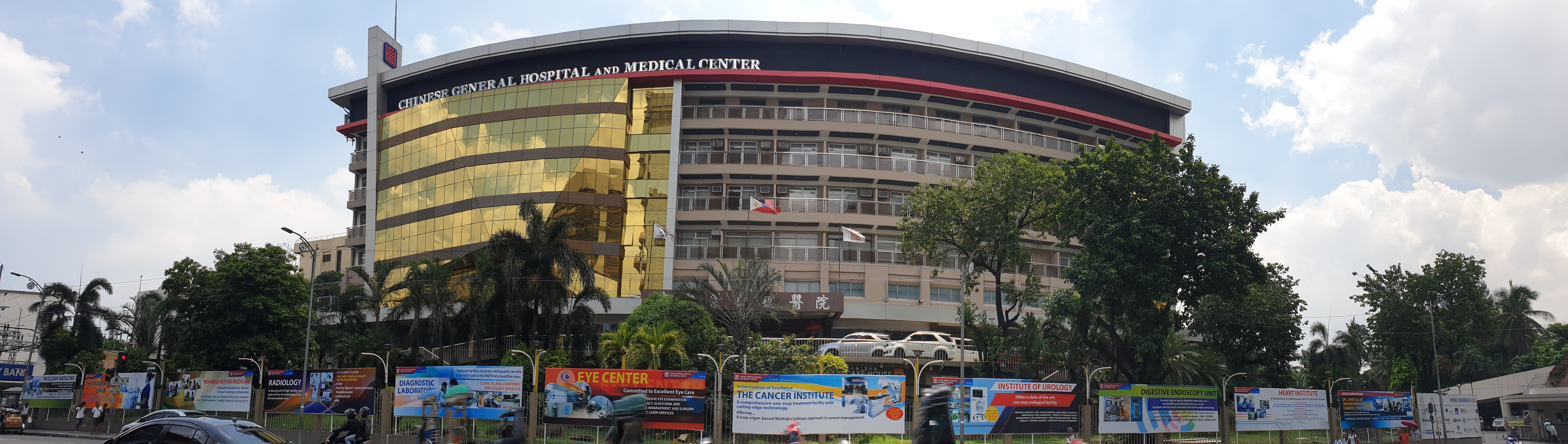
- Facade of the Hospital

Geography
- Location: 286 Blumentritt St., Santa Cruz, Manila, Metro Manila, Philippines
- Coordinates: 14°37′35″N 120°59′16″E

Organization
- Type: Private, Charity, teaching
- Affiliated university: Chinese General Hospital Colleges

Services
- Beds: 600

Links
- Website: www.cghmc.com.ph

Chinese General Hospital and Medical Center
- Traditional Chinese: 中華崇仁總醫院暨醫學中心
- Simplified Chinese: 中华崇仁总医院暨医学中心
Transcriptions
Standard Mandarin
- Hanyu Pinyin: Zhōnghuá Chóngrén Zǒngyīyuàn jì Yīxué Zhōngxīn
- Wade–Giles: Chung1-hua2 ch'ung2-jen2 tsung3-i1-yüan4 chi4 i1-hsüeh2 chung1-hsin1
Southern Min
- Hokkien POJ: Tiong-hoâ Chiông-lîn Chóng-i-īⁿ kap I-ha̍k Tiong-sim

Chinese General Hospital and Medical Center (CGHMC) (Chinese: 中華崇仁總醫院暨醫學中心), also known as the Chinese General Hospital, is a district general hospital and teaching hospital in Manila, Philippines. It is one of the oldest hospitals in the Philippines, founded in 1891 during the Spanish occupation of the country from donations of Chinese immigrants. The hospital's operations is supported by the Philippine Chinese Charitable Association (PCCA), founded in 1878 when the Chinese community was established in Manila.

== History ==
Capitán Carlos L. Palanca (Tan Chue-Co), with wealthy Chinese businessmen Engracio Palanca (Tan Kang), and Mariano Velasco (Chua Cheng-Co) did a fund-raising in 1891 for the construction of a medical clinic where treatment was free of charge. Through funds coming from Chinese stores and special fees from Chinese people who arrived from China, the medical clinic expanded into a hospital. In 1893, it was named "Hospital de Chinos".

During the American colonization in 1898, Capitan Carlos L. Palanca (Tan Chue-Co) became the first Chinese Acting Consul. Hospital de Chinos became inadequate for the swelling number of Chinese residents in Manila, Philippines. A fund raising campaign was done to construct the first Chinese General Hospital (CGH) with updated facilities in 1917.

One of the most noted doctors during his time, Dr. José Tee Han-kee became the first medical director and the new hospital was inaugurated in 1921. He also served as consultant for the Philippine Health Service because of his expertise in the bubonic plague. Also in the same year when the Chinese General Hospital School of Nursing was also founded.

The hospital's operation was affected during World War II. Directors and those with higher positions in the hospital became political prisoners of war, followed by mass evacuation. To keep the hospital functioning, the principal, chief nurse, some graduate and some student nurses, two junior resident physicians, and some male helpers was made part of a skeleton staff. In 1945, more than five hundred victims of shrapnel and bullets were admitted to the Chinese General Hospital, even occupying all available spaces in the corridors.

Antonio Nubia was installed as director with Manuel Chua-Chiaco Sr. as assistant director after World War II. The hospital was immediately reconstructed in 1946 through the help of Chinese communities. In 1948, the Charity Pavilion was constructed across the main building.

The hospital was refurbished in 1950. The hospital also catered training and teaching, as approved by Pedro Mayuga, former Director of the Philippine Bureau of Medical Services of the Department of Health. Luis Guerrero, Antonio G. Sison, Jose Albert, Florencio Quintos, Rosendo R. Llamas, and Fortunato Guerrero were the consultants of the hospital.

More improvements happened from the 1950s onward. Guillermo A. Cu-Unjieng Sr. Chest Pavilion was inaugurated 1953 by her daughter Sr. Esperanza Ma. A. Cu-Unjieng and prominent philanthropists. In 1957, Cheng Tsai Jun Memorial 100-bed Charity Wards were established. Two years later, Chinese General Hospital and Medical Center had another facelift. A bigger Emergency Building with three stories was constructed in 1971. The School of Nursing Building with six stories was completed in 1975. And in 1983, a six-storey annex to the Main Building was built.

Lim Ka-sian was appointed new director and James G. Dy as president of the Philippine Chinese Charitable Association in 1990s. Every department was expanded and computerisation and updating of medical equipment and appliances happened. In 1996, the Heart Institute was built with renowned cardiologist Dy Bun Yok as Director and Manual Chua-Chiaco Jr. as the Chief in Cardiovascular Surgery.

The present director CGHMC is James Dy. In 2014, the hospital renewed a Memorandum of Agreement (MOA) with the Intelligence Service Armed Forces of the Philippines (ISAFP) assuring its personnel of free medical care at the CGHMC in the event they get injured while performing their duty. The Philippine National Police (PNP) and the National Bureau of Investigation (NBI) also have the same MOAs with the hospital.

== See also ==
Other Chinese hospitals and health care serving local Chinese communities:

- San Francisco Chinese Hospital
- Montreal Chinese Hospital
- Yee Hong Centre for Geriatric Care - Greater Toronto Area
