= Montreal Chinese Hospital =

Montreal Chinese Hospital Hôpital chinois de Montréal 满地可中华医院
- CIUSSS du Centre-Sud-de-L’Île-de-Montréal
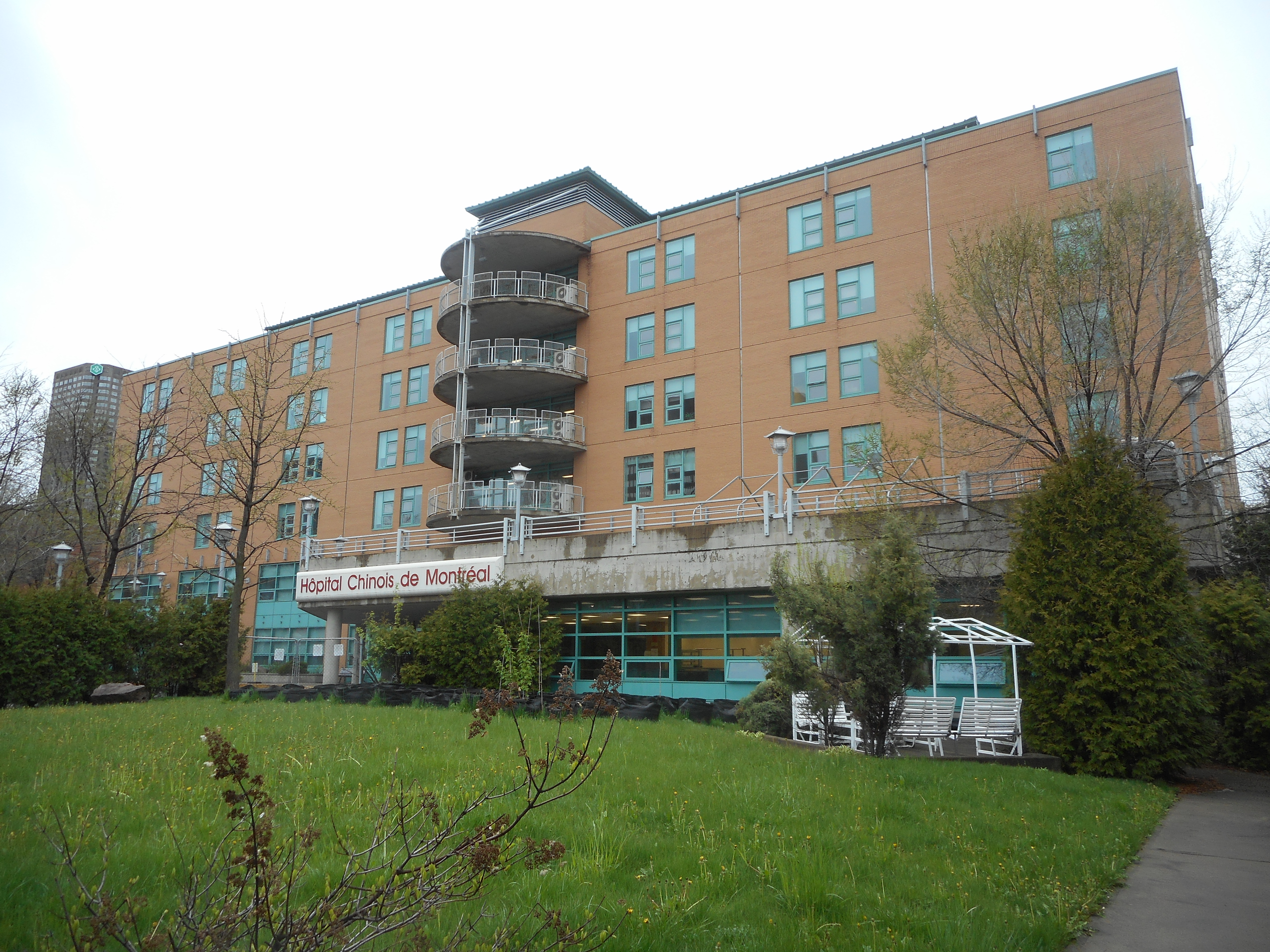

- Location in Montreal

Geography
- Location: 189, avenue Viger Est; Montreal, Quebec, Canada; H2X 3Y9
- Coordinates: 45.509505°N 73.557954°W

Organisation
- Care system: RAMQ (Quebec Health Insurance Board)

Services
- Beds: 128

History
- Founded: 1920

Links
- Website: montrealchinesehospital.ca

Montreal Chinese Hospital

Chinese name
- Simplified Chinese: 满地可中华医院
- Traditional Chinese: 滿地可中華醫院
Transcriptions
Standard Mandarin
- Hanyu Pinyin: Mǎndìkě Zhōnghuá Yīyuàn
Yue: Cantonese
- Jyutping: Mun5 dei6 ho2 zung1 waa4 ji1 jyun6*2

French name
- French: Hôpital chinois de Montréal

The Montreal Chinese Hospital (French: Hôpital chinois de Montréal; Chinese: 满地可中华医院) is a former hospital and current long-term care facility (CHSLD) on Viger Avenue, just east of Le Quartier Chinois.

Despite no longer being an active hospital or having an emergency room, it maintains its historic name and primary mandate to serve the Chinese Canadian community residing in the province of Quebec. It is the only Chinese hospital in Canada. The Montreal Chinese Hospital has 128 beds.

== History ==
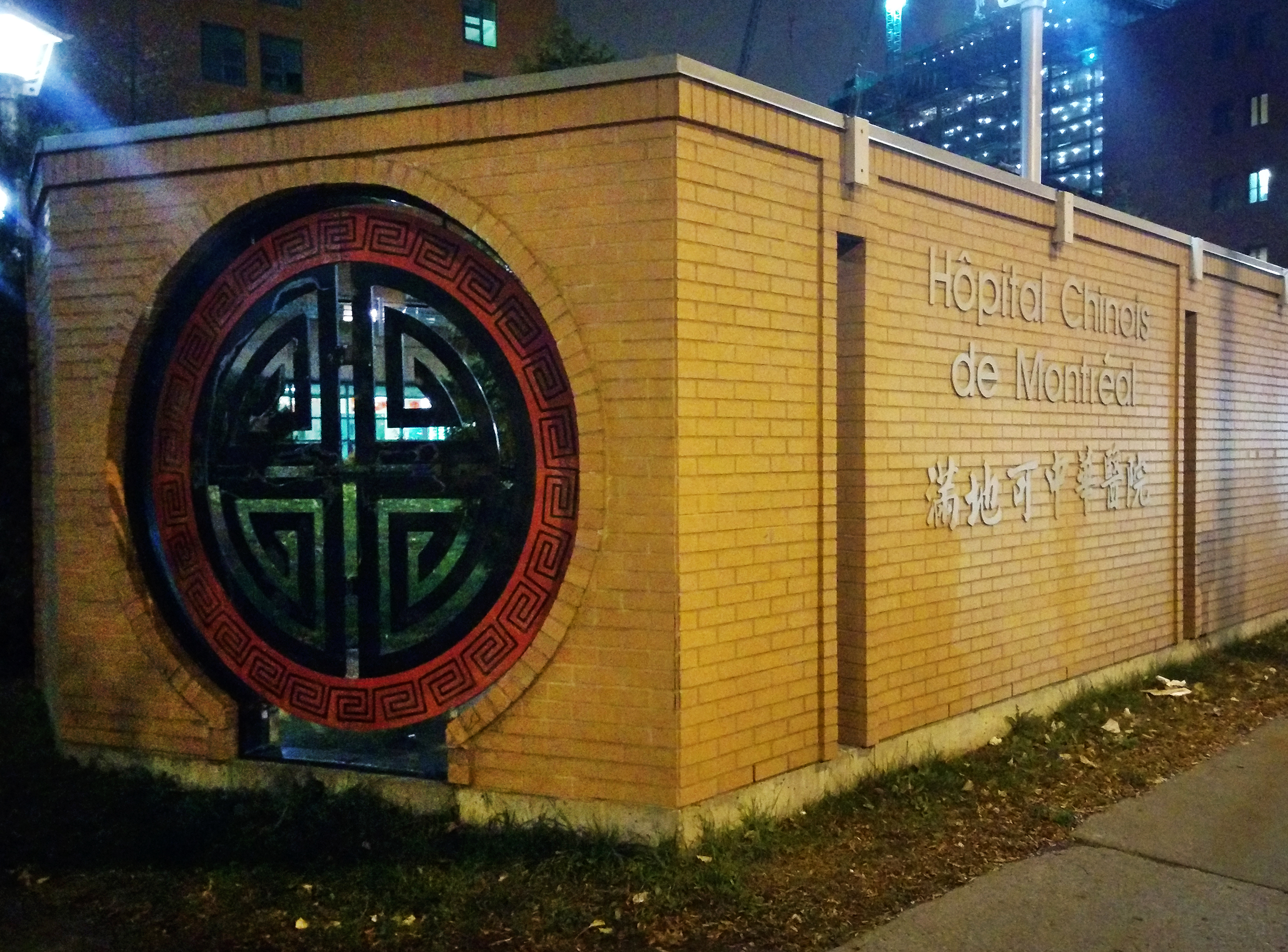
Wall at the entrance of the hospital on Avenue Viger.

The Montreal Chinese Hospital traces its history to the 1918 flu pandemic. The Venerable Delia Tétreault (Mother Mary of the Holy Spirit) set up a 7-bed emergency shelter on Clark Street serving 55 Chinese men during the 1918 flu pandemic.

This temporary shelter closed its doors in 1919, and the Nuns returned to their convent. In 1919 or 1920, the Chinese community in Montreal acquired a former synagogue, to serve as their permanent hospital, located at 112 De la Gauchetière Street (it is now a commercial building), in present-day Chinatown. Health care would be provided at this location for the next 45 years. The city of Montreal declared the location unfit to serve as a medical institution in 1962, and the following year the Chinese community raised CAD$1,000,000 toward constructing a new facility. A new 65-bed hospital opened in 1965 located at 7500 Saint-Denis Street, corner Faillon Street East, in the borough of Villeray–Saint-Michel–Parc-Extension. The Montreal Chinese Hospital joined the Quebec Hospital Association in 1966, and from then on, its operating expenses were covered by the Quebec government.

The current location of the hospital was constructed from 1997 to 1999. The new location on Viger Street opened its doors in April 1999, following a successful fund-raising campaign.

== See also ==
Other Chinese hospitals and health care serving local Chinese communities:

- San Francisco Chinese Hospital
- Yee Hong Centre for Geriatric Care - Greater Toronto Area
- Tung Wah Group of Hospitals - Hong Kong
- Chinese General Hospital and Medical Center - Manila
