= Willie "Woo Woo" Wong =

Chinese-American basketball player

William George Wong
- 黃顯護
- #13 for the Chinese Saints (c.1948)
- Born: January 29, 1927; San Francisco, California
- Died: September 5, 2005 (aged 78); Fremont, California
- Other name: Wong Hing Woo; "Woo Woo" Wong
- Occupation: basketball player
- Spouse: Jennie Wong
- Children: 2
- Relatives: Helen Wong Lum (sister)

Willie Wong (traditional Chinese: 黃顯護; simplified Chinese: 黄显护; pinyin: Huáng Xiǎnhù; Jyutping: Wong^{4} Hin^{2}wu^{6}) (1927–2005) was an American basketball player who was born and raised in Chinatown, San Francisco. Though Wong was only 5 ft 5 in (1.65 m) tall, he excelled, and was known as one of the finest Chinese American basketball players in the 1940s. He was nicknamed "Woo Woo" Wong by Bob Brachman, a local sportswriter for the San Francisco Examiner, because fans would shout "Woo Woo" when he scored.

== Early life and education ==
Wong was the third of seven children, and his family lived across the street from Chinese Playground, where he learned to play basketball. A sister, Helen Wong Lum, would also go on to stand out as a basketball and tennis player. Wong received his first basketball as a gift in 1939 from an uncle he had never before met.

He studied at the St. Mary's School, and then starred at Poly and Lowell high schools in San Francisco, being named to the All-City team in 1945. Wong served in the Army after graduating from high school.

== Sports career ==
I used to stand and watch, and I was always the last guy picked for teams. When I got to play, they always yelled at me not to shoot, because I couldn't. That became motivation for me.

— Willie Wong, March 2005 interview

Wong played for an all-Chinese American basketball team sponsored by the H. K. and Frank Sports Shop (aka the Chinese All-Stars) in 1946 and 1947. The Chinese All-Stars played a series of exhibition games against Santa Cruz city league teams; the first, held March 8, 1946, saw the Santa Cruz Sportsman's Shop team win by the score of 50–46. The Santa Cruz Sentinel-News reported the "Chinese scat cagers" were "[t]errific crowd pleasers" and "made swell passes and plenty of nice baskets" but "couldn't beat the backboard control of the Sportsmen". In the second, which was held three weeks later on March 29 at the Santa Cruz Civic Auditorium to benefit the local Red Cross, the Chinese All-Stars prevailed, 50–41. The Sentinel-News noted the Chinese All-Stars featured "a smooth passing, fast dribbling" attack and had Chinese numerals on their jerseys "which gave the scorers and announcer a tough time."

The Chinese All-Stars returned to Santa Cruz to play the Hotel team, preseason favorites for the Santa Cruz City League title, on December 16, 1946, winning by a score of 39–34. The Hotelmen won the next match on February 21, 1947, 49–44 in overtime. Willie Wong scored to tie the game at 42 with ten seconds left in regulation, and led the All-Stars with sixteen points for the game. The team from San Francisco, then renamed the Chinese Saints and playing for St. Mary's Chinese Mission, beat the Hotelmen in their third final game on March 21, 1947, by a score of 46–39. Wong scored 20 for the winners.

In 1947, the Saints won the first Oriental-American basketball championship by defeating the Hawaiian All Stars 48–43. Willie Wong scored 27 for the Saints. The Saints repeated their championship in 1948, defeating the Berkeley Nisei 49–45. Wong scored 16 points to lead all scorers. In 1948, Wong was invited to fly to Shanghai to try out for the Chinese Olympic basketball team.

He was recruited to the University of San Francisco (USF) in 1948 by Pete Newell after Newell saw him win his first title with the Saints. At USF, he played off the bench for the 1949–50 varsity squad and attracted national attention, with Jim O'Leary calling him "one of the wonders of the athletic world"; Newell praised Wong's shooting touch, as the guard was making more than 60 percent of his field goals. USF attended the NIT in 1950, and Wong became the first Chinese American to play in Madison Square Garden. After playing for USF, Wong continued to compete at various local and national tournaments as part of the Saints.

Wong also played for the Oakland Atlas-Pacific Engineers of the National Industrial Basketball League during that team's final season (1951–52).

Wong died on September 5, 2005, of leukemia at the age of 79 in Fremont, California. He was survived by his wife Jennie, their two sons, and six grandchildren.

== Legacy ==
To honor Wong's athletic achievements, local Chinatown residents successfully petitioned the City and County of San Francisco to rename the "Chinese Playground", where he played as a child and developed his basketball skills, to "Willie "Woo Woo" Wong Playground". It was closed for more than two years while undergoing a $14.5 million renovation, and reopened in February 2021 with "dragon and phoenix" play structures.

The University of San Francisco posthumously inducted Wong into its Hall of Fame in the spring of 2007. Wong's family accepted the honor on his behalf.

== Gallery ==
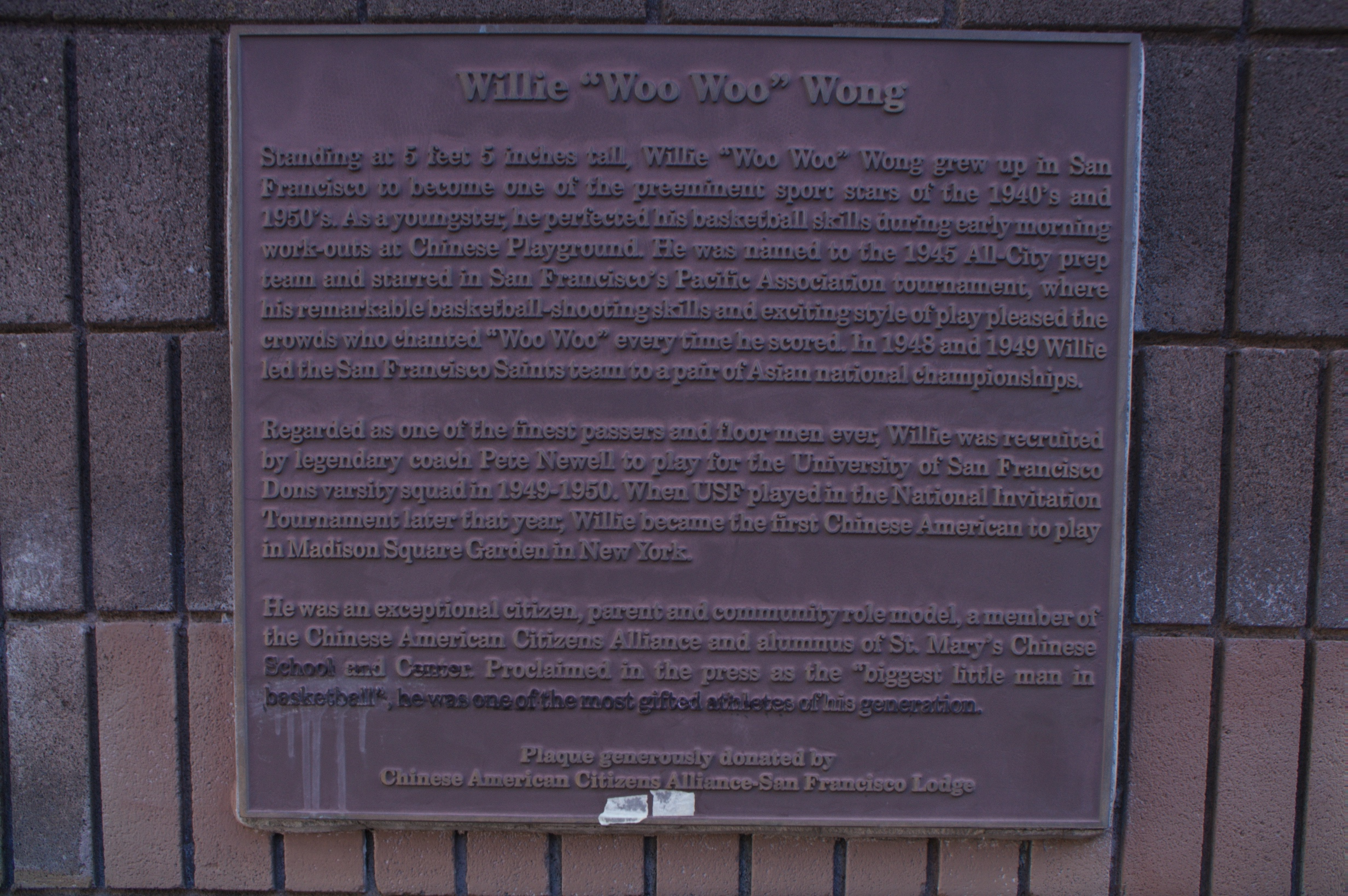
Dedication plaque on the stairway (now demolished) leading up to the basketball court at the former Chinese Playground

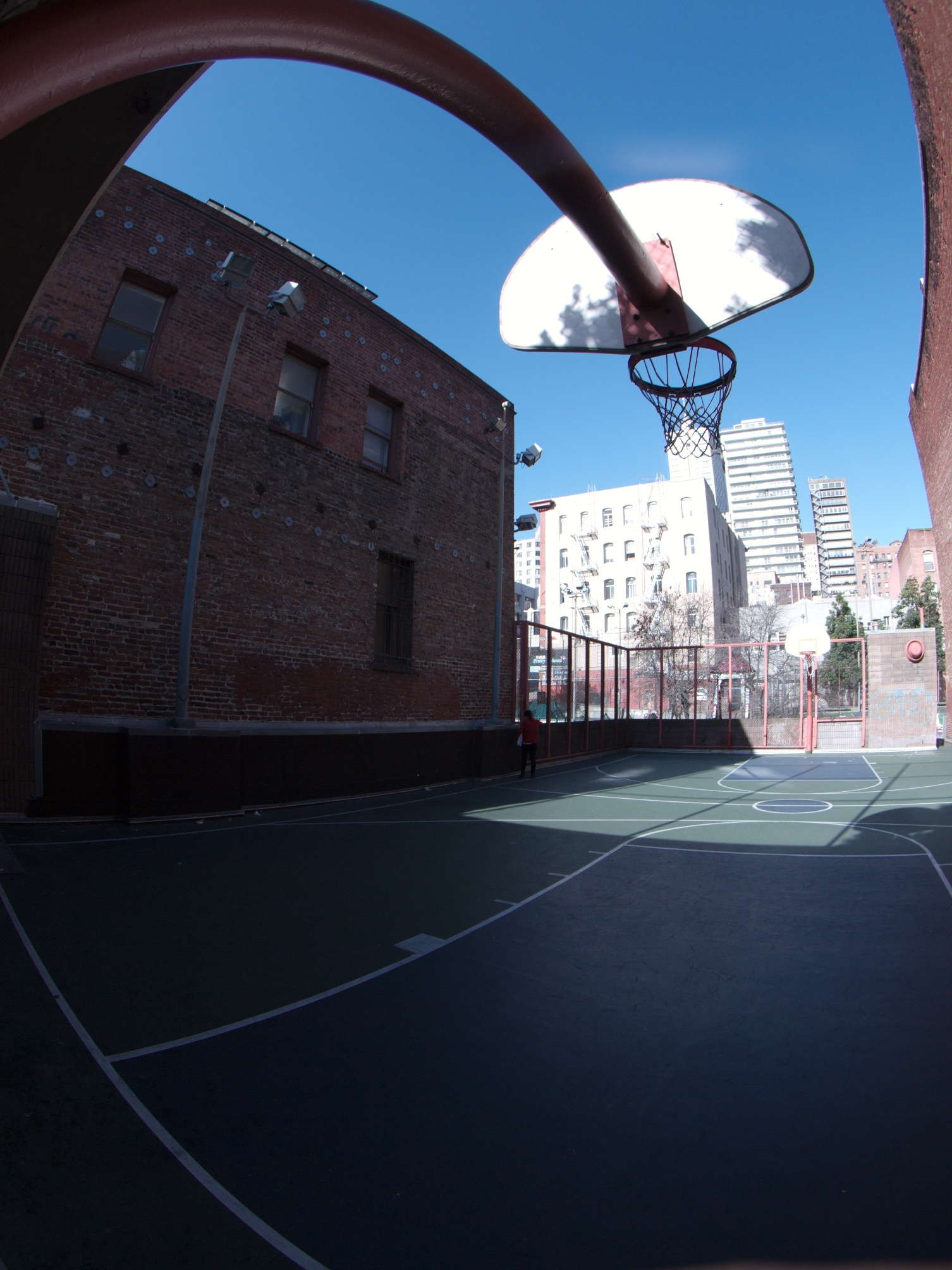
Basketball court (now demolished) at Chinese Playground

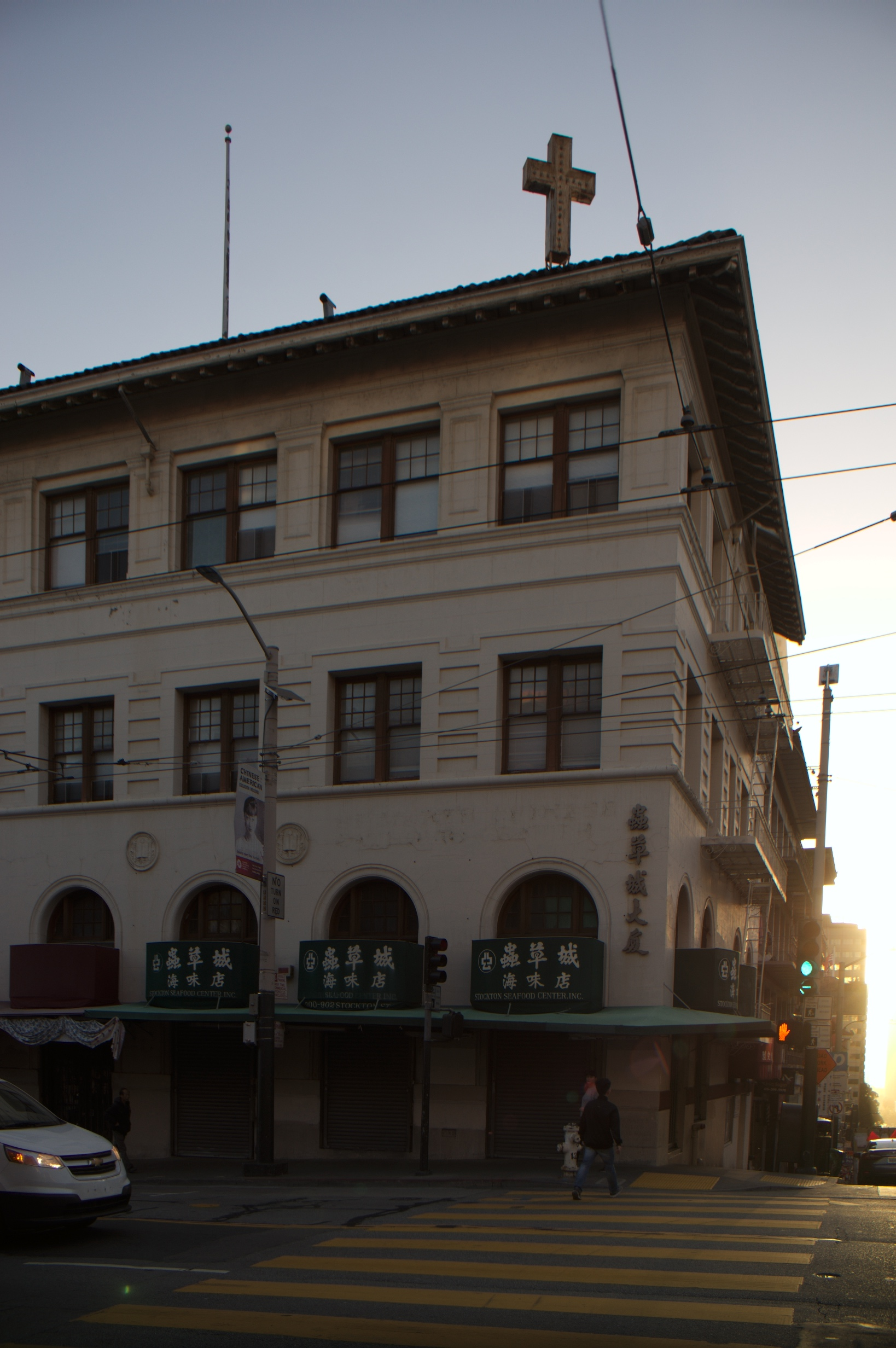
Former site of St. Mary's Chinese School

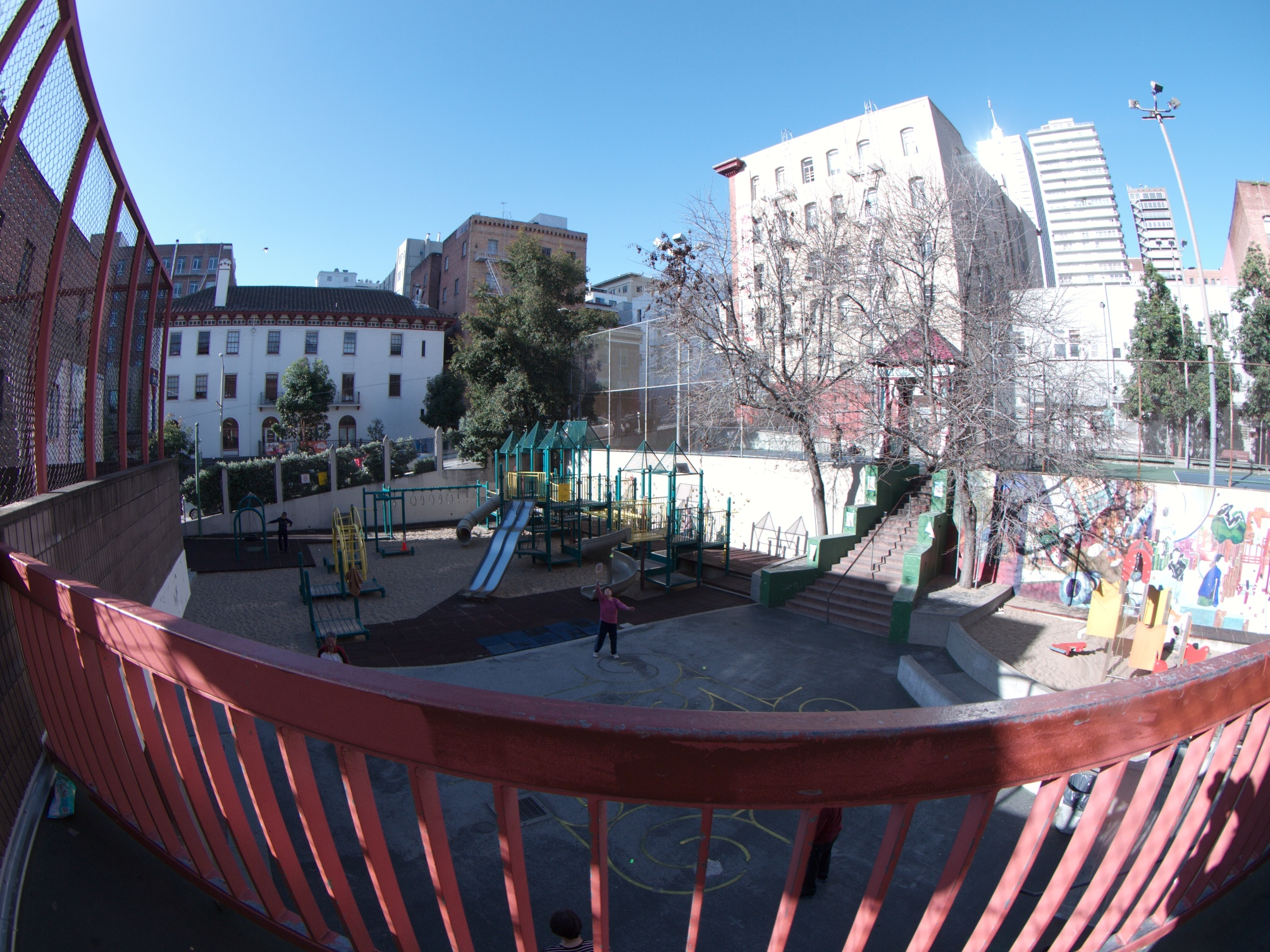
Overview of Chinese Playground (now demolished), looking south towards Sacramento and the YMCA

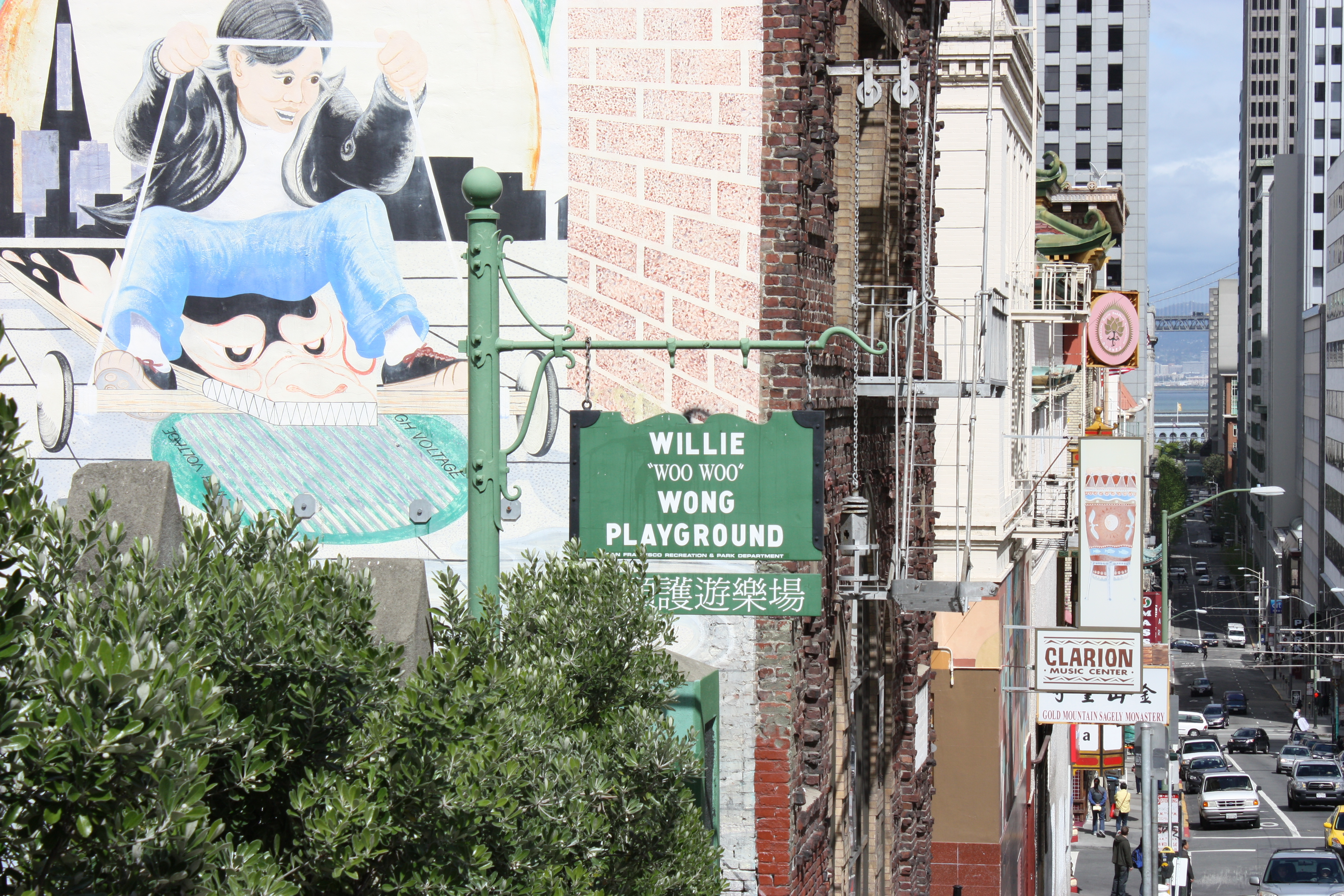
Entrance of Willie "Woo Woo" Wong Playground
