= Sept Days =

- Native name: 七天
- Type: Weekly newspaper
- Format: Tabloid
- Owner(s): Yin, Ling (尹灵)
- Publisher: Yin, Ling
- Editor-in-chief: Isa Li (颜宏)
- Founded: July 7th, 2006
- Language: Chinese
- Headquarters: 3420 rue Fabien-Laberge, Montreal, Quebec
- Circulation: 17,000
- ISSN: 1929-6320
- Website: septdays.com

Sept Days (Chinese: 七天) is a weekly Chinese language Chinese newspaper in Montreal, Quebec, Canada. It publishes the Chinese-language newspaper Sept Days, a business weekly and a monthly newspaper La Connexion in French. It also has a readers club that organizes activities.

== History ==
Sept Days was established on July 7, 2006, by Yin Ling (simplified Chinese: 尹灵; traditional Chinese: 尹靈. The newspaper's masthead has the text "Sept七天 Days", containing French, Chinese, and English words to represent that as a Canada-based publication, Sept Days is in a multicultural environment.

Whereas numerous other Overseas Chinese newspapers translated local news, Sept Days did original reporting. During the War in Afghanistan in 2007, Sept Days sent their journalist Hu Xian to cover Canada's involvement in the war. Hu was the first Overseas Chinese war correspondent to cover the war. In 2008, the publication employed three reporters who worked full-time as well as five freelance journalists. They performed entertainment journalism and covered local and international news. The founder said that year that the newspaper had 50,000 weekly readers and for every edition 10,000 papers are printed. The newspaper had not make a profit in 2008 and relied on advertisements and the board of director's funding.

The newspaper began publishing a French edition, La Connexion, in 2016. By 2021, it had published eight books. This included Inspired by Norman Bethune (2014) and Elite Chinese Canadians (2018).

Sept Days has ties with the Chinese Communist Party. During Chinese premier Li Keqiang's 2016 trip to Canada, he asked Sept Days to join a Chinese media symposium.
