= Les Presses Chinoises =

Canadian Chinese-language newspaper

- Owner: Crescent Chau
- Language: Chinese
- Headquarters: Montreal
- City: Montreal and Toronto
- Country: Canada
- Circulation: 15,000 (as of March 2003)

Les Presses Chinoises is a Chinese-language newspaper in Montreal, Canada.

Headquartered in Montreal, as of March 2003 the Chinese-language newspaper had a circulation of 15000 in Montreal and Toronto, and was owned by Crescent Chau.

== Falun Gong ==
In 2001 and 2002, members of the Falun Gong received injunctions against Les Presses Chinoises, for the paper's attacks against the group. In 2003, over 200 members from Ottawa and Montreal again took the newspaper to court in Quebec, after it claimed that the practitioners "have sex with animals, commit murder, are involved in criminal activities, are saboteurs of the state of China, [and] are enemies of the state in China and Canada." The litigants requested damages of CA$100,000 (equivalent to $152,821 in 2023) and another injunction against the paper. A Quebec court issued a cease and desist, prohibiting the newspaper from publishing hate speech and defamation. The paper did not comply, and faced contempt of court charges in March 2005.
