= Index of articles related to Asian Americans =

This is an alphabetical index of topics related to Asian Americans.

== 0-9 ==
- 49-Mile Scenic Drive
- 80-20 Initiative
- 99 Ranch Market
- 100th Infantry Battalion
- 442nd Regimental Combat Team

== A ==
- A Magazine
- Aim High Academy
- Adopt-An-Alleyway Youth Empowerment Project
- Affirmative action
- Ah Ken
- Alien land laws
- Allen Street
- Amerasian
- American Chinese cuisine
- American television series with Asian leads
- Angel Island
- Asian American
- Asian American activism
- Asian American and Pacific Islander Policy Research Consortium
- Asian American Arts Centre
- Asian American Curriculum Project
- Asian American Dance Theatre
- Asian American International Film Festival
- Asian American hip hop
- Asian American jazz
- Asian American Journalists Association
- Asian American Legal Defense and Education Fund
- Asian American Literary Review
- Asian American literature
- Asian American Literature Festival
- Asian American movement
- Asian American Political Alliance
- Asian American Student Union
- Asian American Studies
- Asian American theatre
- Asian American Women Artists Association
- Asian American Writers' Workshop
- Asian Americans (documentary series)
- Asian Americans in arts and entertainment
- Asian Americans in California
- Asian Americans in Chicago
- Asian Americans in Houston
- Asian Americans in Los Angeles
- Asian Americans in Maryland
- Asian Americans in Nevada
- Asian Americans in New York City
- Asian Americans in Virginia
- Asian Americans in politics
- Asian Americans in science and technology
- Asian Americans in sports
- Asian fetish
- Asian immigration to the United States
- Asian Latino
- Asian Pacific American
- Asian/Pacific American Awards for Literature
- Asian Pacific American Heritage Festival
- Asian Pacific American Heritage Month
- Asian Pacific Thematic Historic District
- Asian pride
- Asian quota in higher education admissions
- Asian Week
- Asians in Rock
- Asiatic Exclusion League
- AZN Television

== B ==
- Bamboo ceiling
- Beating of Peter Yew

== C ==
- California Street (San Francisco)
- Donaldina Cameron
- Cathay Bank
- Cathedral High School (Los Angeles)
- Cayetano Apablasa
- Cedar Grove OnStage
- Cedar Grove Productions
- Center for Asian American Media
- Chan Is Missing
- Chin, Vincent
- Chinatown
- Chinatown (1974 film)
- Chinatown Family
- Chinatown, Honolulu
- Chinatown Kid
- Chinatown, Los Angeles
- Chinatown (Los Angeles Metro station)
- Chinese American
- Chinese American Museum
- Chinese American Citizens Alliance
- Chinese-American Planning Council
- Chinese Cemetery of Los Angeles
- Chinese Consolidated Benevolent Association
- Chinese Consulate-General, Los Angeles
- Chinese Culture Center
- Chinese Historical Society of America
- Chinese Historical Society of Southern California
- Chinese Exclusion Act
- Chinese Immersion School at De Avila
- Chinese for Affirmative Action
- Chinese Massacre of 1871
- Chinese school
- Ching Chong
- Chung Ching Yee
- Chung King Road
- City College of San Francisco
- Clement Street Chinatown, San Francisco
- Columbus Avenue (San Francisco)
- Commercial Street, San Francisco
- Congressional Asian Pacific American Caucus
- Coolie

== D ==
- Demographics of Asian Americans
- Desi
- Deportation of Cambodian Americans
- Dev Bootcamp
- Dim Sum: A Little Bit of Heart
- Division Street (Manhattan)
- Donald Duk
- Downtown Magnets High School
- Doyers Street

== E ==
- East–West Center
- East West Players
- The Eighth Promise
- Eng Suey Sun Association

== F ==
- FilCom Center
- Filipinos in Los Angeles
- Filipino American History Month
- Filipino American Friendship Day
- First transcontinental railroad
- Flip
- Forbidden City (nightclub)
- Flower Drum Song
- Flower Drum Song (film)
- The Flower Drum Song
- Fresh off the boat

== G ==
- Geary Act
- Gentlemen's Agreement
- Gin Family Association
- Golden Dragon massacre
- Golden Gate Fortune Cookie Company
- Got Rice?
- Grant Avenue

== H ==
- Hapa
- Hawaii Hochi
- Hawaii Kotohira Jinsha – Hawaii Dazaifu Tenmangu
- Hawaii Shingon Mission
- Health status of Asian Americans
- Historic Filipinotown, Los Angeles, California
- History of Asian Americans
- History of the Chinese Americans in Los Angeles
- History of Chinese Americans in San Francisco
- History of Japanese Americans in San Francisco
- History of the Koreans in Baltimore
- James Hong
- You Chung Hong
- Hong Fook Tong Chinese Dramatic Company

== I ==
- Immigration Act of 1917
- Immigration Act of 1924
- Import scene
- Indian Americans in Greater Los Angeles
- Indian Americans in the San Francisco Bay Area
- International Examiner
- International Hotel (San Francisco)
- Irving Street Chinatown, San Francisco
- Izumo Taishakyo Mission of Hawaii

== J ==
- Jack Kerouac Alley
- Jackson Street Boys
- Jade Ribbon Campaign
- Japanese American
- Japanese American Citizens League
- Japanese American internment
- Japanese American National Museum
- Japantown
- Jian Li
- Joe's Shanghai
- Jook sing
- The Joy Luck Club (novel)
- Judges

== K ==
- KAHZ
- KAZN
- KHCM (AM)
- KHRA
- Kearny Street
- Killing of Vincent Chin
- Kong Chow Temple
- Korean adoptee
- Korean American
- Korean Americans in Greater Los Angeles
- Korean school
- Koreatown
- KPHI
- KREA
- Kung Phooey
- Kyoto Gardens of Honolulu Memorial Park
- KZOO
- Korean National Association

== L ==
- List of Asian-American firsts
- List of Asian Americans
- List of Asian Academy Award winners and nominees
- List of Asian American jurists
- List of Asian American theatre companies
- List of Asian American writers
- List of Asian Tony Award winners and nominees
- List of U.S. communities with Asian-American majority populations
- List of documentary films about the Japanese American internment
- List of streets and alleys in Chinatown, San Francisco
- Little Manila
- Little Saigon
- Los Angeles Asian Pacific Film Festival

== M ==
- Magnuson Act
- Making Tracks Asian American historical musical
- Miguel Contreras Learning Complex
- Military history of Asian Americans
- MinKwon Center for Community Action
- Miss Asian America
- Model minority
- Mott Street
- MTV Chi
- MTV Desi
- MTV K
- Museum of Chinese in America

== N ==
- Narasaki, Karen
- New York Filipino Film Festival
- Haing S. Ngor
- Nisei Baseball Research Project
- No-No Boy
- Noriega Street Chinatown, San Francisco
- Northwest Asian Weekly
- Nyotaimori

== O ==
- Old Saint Mary's Cathedral
- Organization of Chinese Americans

== P ==
- Pacific Buddhist Academy
- Philippe's
- Philippine Independence Day Parade
- Portsmouth Square
- Portrayal of East Asians in American film and theater
- Powell Street (San Francisco)
- Preferred Bank

== R ==
- Racist love
- Ross Alley

== S ==
- San Francisco Chinatown: A Guide to Its History & Architecture
- San Francisco Chinese Hospital
- San Francisco Chinese New Year Festival and Parade
- San Francisco plague of 1900–04
- San Francisco Riot of 1877
- SARS and accusations of racial discrimination
- Sam Wo
- Sam Woo Restaurant
- Seattle Asian American Film Festival
- Lisa See
- Secret Asian Man
- Sex crimes against Asian women in the United States
- Shadows Over Chinatown
- Shuang Wen Academy Network
- Silk Road Rising
- The Slanted Screen
- South Asian Americans
- Stereotypes of Asians (disambiguation)
- Stereotypes of East Asians in the United States
- St. Hedwig's Church (Chicago)
- Stockton Street (San Francisco)
- Stockton Street Tunnel
- Stop AAPI Hate
- Stop Asian Hate
- St. Wenceslaus Church, Chicago
- Sodhi, Balbir Singh

== T ==
- Taiwanese American
- Takao Ozawa v. United States
- Thien Hau Temple, Los Angeles
- Ah Toy
- Church of the Transfiguration, Roman Catholic (Manhattan)
- The New Korea

== U ==
- USA for Indonesia
- United Chinese Society

== V ==
- VC FilmFest
- Visual Communications (VC)

== W ==
- Wah Ching
- Wen Ho Lee
- Otto G. Weyse
- Willie "Woo Woo" Wong
- Wing Luke Asian Museum
- Workingman's Party
- Tyrus Wong

== X ==
- Xenophobia and racism related to the COVID-19 pandemic

== Y ==
- The Year of the Dragon (play)
- Yellow Peril
- Yellowface
- Yellowworld
- Yick Wo v. Hopkins
