= List of streets and alleys in Chinatown, San Francisco =

The following is a list of streets and alleys that are within or pass through San Francisco's Chinatown.

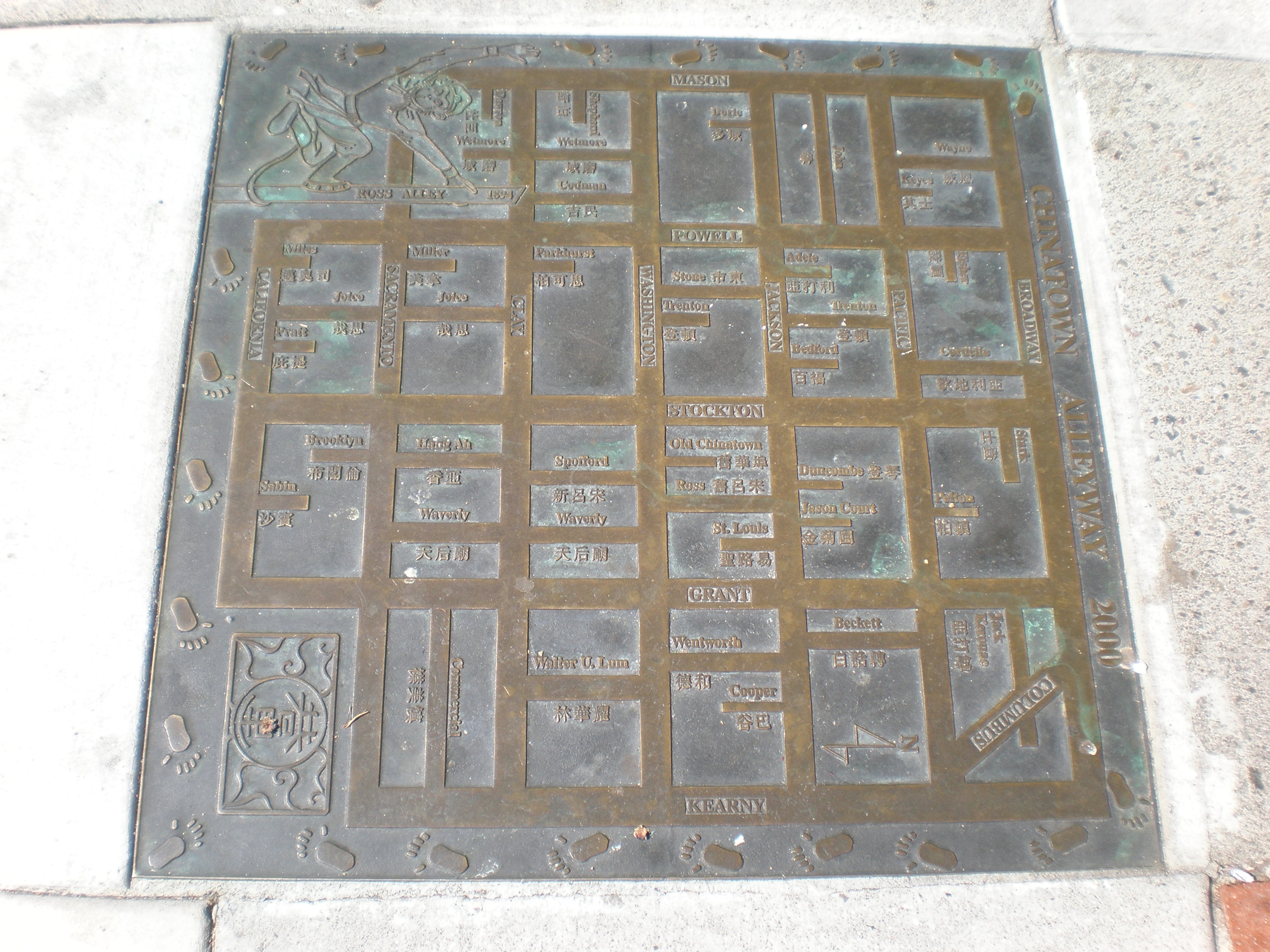
A plaque map of San Francisco's Chinatown.

Current name	Former name	Official Chinese name/Alternate Chinese name
Adele Court		亞打利巷
Beckett Street	Bartlett Alley, Lozier Street	白話轉街
Bedford Place		百福巷
Broadway		布律威街
Brooklyn Place		布閣倫巷
Bush Street		補市街
California Street		加利福尼亞街
Clay Street		企李街
Codman Place		吉民巷
Commercial Street		襟美慎街
Cooper Alley		谷巴巷
Cordelia Street		歌地利亞街
Dawson Place		杜臣巷
Doric Alley		多域巷
Duncombe Alley		燈琴巷/肥仔巷
Fisher Alley		
Grant Avenue	Dupont Street	都板街
Hang Ah Alley		香亞街/香雅巷
Jack Kerouac Alley	Adler Place	亞打罅巷
Jackson Street		昃臣街/積臣街
James Place		
Jason Court	Sullivan Alley	金菊園巷
John Street		
Joice Street		哉思街
Kearny Street		乾尼街
Keyes Alley		其士巷
Mason Street		美臣街
Miles Court		邁奧司巷
Miller Place		美拿巷
Old Chinatown Lane	Cameron Alley, Portola Alley, Church Court	舊華埠巷/馬房巷
Pacific Avenue		柏思域街
Parkhurst Alley		柏可思巷
Pelton Place		柏頓巷
Pine Street		板街
Pontiac Alley		麵包巷
Powell Street		跑華街
Pratt Place	Ellick Lane	庇提巷
Ross Alley	Stouts Alley	舊呂宋巷
Sabin Place	Salina Place	沙賓巷
Sacramento Street		唐人街/沙加緬度街
Shepard Place		舒伯巷
Spofford Alley		新呂宋巷
Stark Alley		士登巷
St Louis Place		聖路易巷/火燒巷
Stockton Street		市德頓街
Stone Street		市東街
Trenton Street		登頓街
Vallejo Street		瓦列霍街
Walter U. Lum Place	Brenham Place	林華耀街/花園街
Washington Street		華盛頓街
Waverly Place	Pike Street	天后廟街
Wayne Place	Scott Place	威恩巷
Wentworth Place	Washington Place	德和街
Wetmore Street		域磨街
