= AACP =

AACP may refer to:

- Above-Anvil Cirrus Plume, or overshooting top
- Advanced Airborne Command Post
- American Academy of Cardiovascular Perfusion
- American Academy of Child Psychiatry, former name of the American Academy of Child and Adolescent Psychiatry
- American Academy of Craniofacial Pain
- American Association of Colleges of Pharmacy
- American Association of Community Psychiatrists
- Asian American Curriculum Project
- Australian Association of Consultant Pharmacy; see The Pharmacy Guild of Australia#The Guild Group of Companies
- High-Efficiency Advanced Audio Coding, also known as aacPlus, and associated with the .aacp file extension
