= San Francisco Chinatown: A Guide to Its History & Architecture =

2012 book by Philip Choy

- Author: Philip Choy
- Language: English
- Publisher: City Lights
- Publication date: August 2012
- Media type: Print (softcover)
- Pages: 224
- ISBN: 978-0-87286-540-2

San Francisco Chinatown: A Guide to Its History & Architecture is a book by Philip Choy, first published in 2012.

== Publication history ==
The book was published in San Francisco in softcover by City Lights. Architectural photographs in the book were taken in the 1980s by Brian Choy for a case report to nominate Chinatown as a historic district.

An earlier, abridged version was published as a pamphlet by the Chinese Historical Society of America.

== Content summary ==
- History – Chinatown overlays significant sites from different periods of San Francisco’ history: the Spanish period, the Mexican period, and the Mexican period.
- Portsmouth Plaza – the heart and soul of the immigrant Chinese community.
- Sacramento Street – a street that has occupied by the Chinese since the Gold Rush.
- Grant Avenue – the oldest street in the city. Rezoned in the 1980s as a major shopping corridor, it reflects the merchandising methods of the newer immigrants.
- Stockton Street – the main commercial district for residents.
- Ross and Spofford Alleys and Waverly Place
  - Ross Alley – it has the only fortune cookie factory in Chinatown: Golden Gate Fortune Cookie Company
  - Spofford Alley - it was frequented by Hispanics for gambling, prostitution, and opium.
  - Waverly Place – the concentration of buildings that represent different types of traditional Chinese organizations.
- Walking Tours

== Biographical sketches ==
Philip P. Choy was born in San Francisco in 1926; his father was a paper son who emigrated to the United States using a resident's identity papers, and his mother was born in America, but returned to China in the wake of the 1906 earthquake. He served in the Army during World War II and attended college using the GI Bill, earning a degree in architecture.

Brian W. Choy, the photographer, is the author's son and was born in 1955. The photographs in the book were taken over a period of months during the early morning hours to avoid obstructions from the usual traffic and crowds.

== Reception ==
Reviews of the guidebook have been positive, praising both its quality and contribution in the acknowledgement of San Francisco Chinatown. Jonah Raskin of the San Francisco Chronicle commented, “Choy’s book takes the curious and the puzzled in hand, shows them the key sights and the important landmarks, and opens the door to a vibrant past.” Another review by The Sacramento Bee said, “Choy has produced a richly illustrated volume that celebrates the history and architecture of this remarkable community.”
