= Adopt-An-Alleyway Youth Empowerment Project =

San Francisco-based American non-profit

- Formation: 1991
- Type: Youth Empowerment
- Headquarters: 655 Clay Street; San Francisco, California; 94111
- Members: ~100
- Website: Official Website

The Adopt-An-Alleyway Youth Empowerment Project is a non-profit project of the Chinatown Community Development Center that is based in the San Francisco Chinatown area.

Volunteers clean the alleyways of San Francisco's Chinatown, organize monthly programs for seniors and children, and provide tours with Chinatown Alleyway Tours.

== History ==
This project started in 1991 when Reverend Norman Fong, a member of the Chinatown Community Development Center and a Chinatown advocate, recruited high school youth from Galileo High School to help him on his quest to beautify the alleyways in San Francisco's Chinatown. Back in the 1980s, the City of San Francisco did not officially recognize alleyways as city streets, so nothing was done to maintain them, leading to excessive amounts of graffiti and trash in those areas. For this reason, he decided to start the project. As of 2007, alleyways are still not considered to be streets because they do not meet the 32 ft width requirement, although other alleyways outside of Chinatown are. As of 2007, there are about 30+ members in the youth empowerment program, and 10 paid workers.

== Volunteer life ==
Adopt-an-Alleyway (AAA) consists of volunteers (general and cabinet members) and coordinator(s). Monthly general meetings are held on the first Friday of each month, where all the volunteers come together to discuss and review upcoming events for that month. The cabinet will have their own meeting every second Friday of each month, supervised by the coordinator, to plan activities and organize events. The cabinet is composed of a president, vice president, two secretaries, four social chairs, and three to five cabinet leaders. The events/volunteer services done by the organization include: "Tenant Services," "Super Sunday," and clean-up/graffiti removal.

"Tenant Services" is done twice a month, where the youths go to single room occupancies around San Francisco's Chinatown and interact with the seniors who live there, bridging the intergeneration gap.

"Super Sunday" is an event where the youth take care of kids while their parents are having SRO meetings at Gordon J. Lau Elementary School.

Clean-up/graffiti removal is where the youth break into groups, led by the cabinet, to sweep or paint over the graffiti of the alleyways of San Francisco's Chinatown.

== Awards ==
On May 12, 2007, The project won the 2007 Crissy Field Heroes award and has a video spot at the Crissy Field Information Center.

As part of the project, the AAA also offers tours of Chinatown's alleyways, beginning at Portsmouth Square.

=== List of Chinatown Alleyways in English and Chinese ===
- Commercial Street - 襟美慎街
- Wentworth Street - 德和街
- Beckett Street - 白話轉街
- Waverly Place - 天后廟街
- Ross Alley - 舊呂宋巷
- Walter U. Lum Place - 林華耀街
- Hang Ah Alley - 香亞街
- Spofford Alley - 新呂宋巷
- Old Chinatown Lane - 舊華埠巷
- St Louis Place - 聖路易巷
- Jack Kerouac Alley - 亞打罅巷
- Stark Alley
- Joice Alley
