= KGMZ =

KGMZ may refer to:

- KGMZ-FM, a radio station (95.7 FM) licensed to San Francisco, California, United States
- KKOL-FM, a radio station (107.9 FM) licensed to Aiea, Hawaii, United States, which used the call signs KGMZ and KGMZ-FM from 1993 to 2008
- KHRA, a radio station (1460 AM) licensed to Honolulu, Hawaii, United States, which used the call sign KGMZ from 1998 to 2000
- KZDG, a radio station (1550 AM) licensed to San Francisco, which used the call sign KGMZ from 2018 to 2022
