= William Poy Lee =

American lawyer

William P. Lee
- Born: 1951 (age 74–75); San Francisco
- Education: University of California, Berkeley; Hastings School of Law
- Occupations: Author, Political Activist
- Writing career
- Language: English
- Notable work: The Eighth Promise
- Notable awards: PEN Oakland/Josephine Miles Literary Award

William Poy Lee (Chinese: 李培湛) is an author and political activist currently living in Shanghai, China. His 2007 book The Eighth Promise is a memoir about two generations of Chinese Americans, in China and Chinatown, San Francisco.

Before becoming a writer, Mr. Lee worked as an international banking attorney and an advertising executive. Mr. Lee left the professional world and has traveled, lived and taught writing in China since 2008. As a political activist, his most recent endeavor is a website about Tibet, Tibet China Accuracy Project
