= Hong Fook Tong Chinese Dramatic Company =

American Cantonese opera company

The Hong Fook Tong Chinese Dramatic Company (Cantonese: 鴻福堂劇團, romanized: Hung⁴ Fuk¹ Tong⁴ Kek⁶ Tyun⁴) (Note: Often misspelled as Hong Took Tong Chinese Dramatic Company.) was an all-male San Francisco, California-based Cantonese opera company which became the first major Asian American theatrical company in the country, inaugurating the first phase of the history of Chinese opera (Note: Cantonese opera is a type of Chinese opera.) in the United States. They were originally from China's Guangdong province.

Their debut performance was on October 18, 1852, with forty-two actors at the American Theater on Sansome Street in San Francisco, and was financed by a group of native Canton (modern day Guangzhou) merchants. It was the first Cantonese, (or for that matter Chinese,) opera ever shown in the country. They performed continuously between December 1852 and March 1853, "to the delight of both American and Chinese audiences," and at one point had 123 actors simultaneously.

After their success was noted by George N. Beach, he offered them a ten-month contract in New York City to perform at the Crystal Palace Exhibition. When the troupe actually arrived in New York, however, Beach would no longer honor the contract. Without a sponsor or a venue they were soon left destitute, without even the funds needed to return to California. In an attempt to raise money, they performed at Niblo's Garden for US$0.50 per ticket, but at the time New York had essentially no Chinese people living there who would properly appreciate the performance. After a lukewarm reception (one critic compared the traditional Cantonese music to "the sound of distressed cats" fused with "ungreased cart wheels", and opined that perhaps the singers were in communion with Satan), the show closed after only one week open, leaving the troupe unable to even pay its hotel bill and having had to pawn their costumes for money. According to Su Zheng's research, some were able to find employ in a workhouse on Roosevelt Island, one attempted suicide, and the rest wandered forlornly through the streets, selling cigars and fabrics. Zheng states that what became of them after that, and whether or not they were ever able to return to California or China, is a mystery.

Historian John Kuo Wei Tchen would take the fate that the troupe suffered in New York as an extreme form of evidence that "authentic Chinese culture was too strange for New Yorkers' tastes" at the time. According to him, "faux Chinese" (yellowface actors and exaggerated, overwrought Oriental exoticism) was more profitable and less risky for theater producers and New York City investors alike throughout the nineteenth and twentieth centuries.

In San Francisco, however, Hong Fook Tong's impact was almost immediately felt: by 1860, another act, the Hing Ching Yuen Dramatic Company began performing at the Commercial Street Bella Union Theater (貝拉聯合戲院), as Hong Fook Tong's success while in California had proven to the local immigrant community such ventures could be profitable in America. By the 1870s, there were four theaters operating concurrently in Chinatown, and the performances shown there drew curious non-Chinese Americans tourists as well. Indeed, tour guides of the period rated plays such as The Return of Sit Pin Quai as obligatory for tourists to San Francisco.

Genuine Chinese theater would not return to New York for thirty-seven years, when the Swin Tien Lok Royal Chinese Dramatic Company, a troupe of fifty actors financed by Wong Chin Foo, put on a show at the Windsor Theater for two weeks in June 1889. That act was also not profitable; it would not be until the mid-twentieth century that New York had regular profitable Chinese-American theatrical productions.
