= Philip Choy =

Philip P. Choy
- Born: December 17, 1926; San Francisco, California, U.S.
- Died: March 16, 2017 (aged 90); San Francisco, California, U.S.
- Occupations: Architect, historian, educator
- Known for: Pioneering Chinese American studies; preservation of Chinese American historical sites
- Title: Adjunct Professor
- Awards: San Francisco State University President’s Medal (2005), Silver SPUR Award (2009), Oscar Lewis Award for Western History (2011)

Academic background
- Education: UC Berkeley (Architecture)

Academic work
- Discipline: Chinese American studies, Architecture
- Institutions: San Francisco State University
- Main interests: Chinese American history, architectural preservation
- Notable works: San Francisco Chinatown (2012), Canton Footprints (2007), The Coming Man (1994)

Philip P. Choy (December 17, 1926 – March 16, 2017) was an architect and historian of Chinese American studies. He is the author of San Francisco Chinatown: A Guide to Its History & Architecture (2012), Canton Footprints: Sacramento’s Chinese Legacy (2007), and The Coming Man: 19th Century American Perceptions of the Chinese (1994). Choy has been a community activist known for landmark preservation in San Francisco.

== Early life ==
Choy was born in San Francisco, California, on December 17, 1926. He grew up in San Francisco Chinatown and he was the fourth in a family of five children with three older sisters and a younger brother. During high school, Choy enlisted in the Army Air Corps.

== Education ==
Choy attended San Francisco City College. During World War II, Choy was called to active duty for basic training in Biloxi, Mississippi. There, in the south, he decided to become an activist after witnessing first-hand the influence of segregation.

After the war, he earned a degree in architecture from UC Berkeley and was involved in residential and commercial design for 50 years.

== Career ==
During the Civil Rights era of the 1960s, Choy became president of the Chinese Historical Society of America and in 1969, he teamed up with historian Him Mark Lai to teach the first-ever Chinese American history course at San Francisco State University in 1969.

Although retired from teaching, Choy is still an adjunct professor in the Asian American Studies Department at San Francisco State University. He has served on the San Francisco Landmark Advisory Board, on the California State Historical Resources Commission from June 2001 to June 2005, five times as President of the Chinese Historical Society of America (CHSA), and currently as an emeritus CHSA board member. He is also a recipient of the San Francisco State University President’s Medal in 2005, the Silver SPUR Awards in 2009, and the Oscar Lewis Award for Western History in 2011.

Choy has devoted his career to researching, preserving, advocating, and disseminating Chinese American history. Choy was the first to make a video documentary series on Chinese American history for public broadcasting called the “Gum Saan Haak” (Travelers to Gold Mountain, 1971-1974). He also publicly challenged the organizers of the 1969 First transcontinental railroad Centennial at Promontory Point to acknowledge the Chinese railroad workers in the construction of the Transcontinental Railroad in the 1860s, thus reclaiming recognition for Chinese railroad workers whose contributions and sacrifices had been neglected for a century. In 1969, Choy as a guest speaker and historian was scheduled to speak on the 100th Anniversary Celebration of the Transcontinental Railroad. At the last moment, he was cut out of the program. This insult resonated throughout the Chinese American community and started a movement to recognize major Chinese contributions in the development of America, like the building of the Central Pacific Railroad. He also advocated the preservation of the Angel Island Immigration Station and in 1993, he wrote the case study to nominate it to the National Register of Historic Places, because of its historical significance as a place where many Chinese immigrants were detained and it also offers a close look at important history lessons about the early Chinese pioneers.

== Personal life ==
Philip Choy died March 16, 2017, in San Francisco after a short battle with cancer.
