= Dragon Gate (San Francisco) =

Ceremonial gateway in Chinatown, San Francisco, California, U.S.

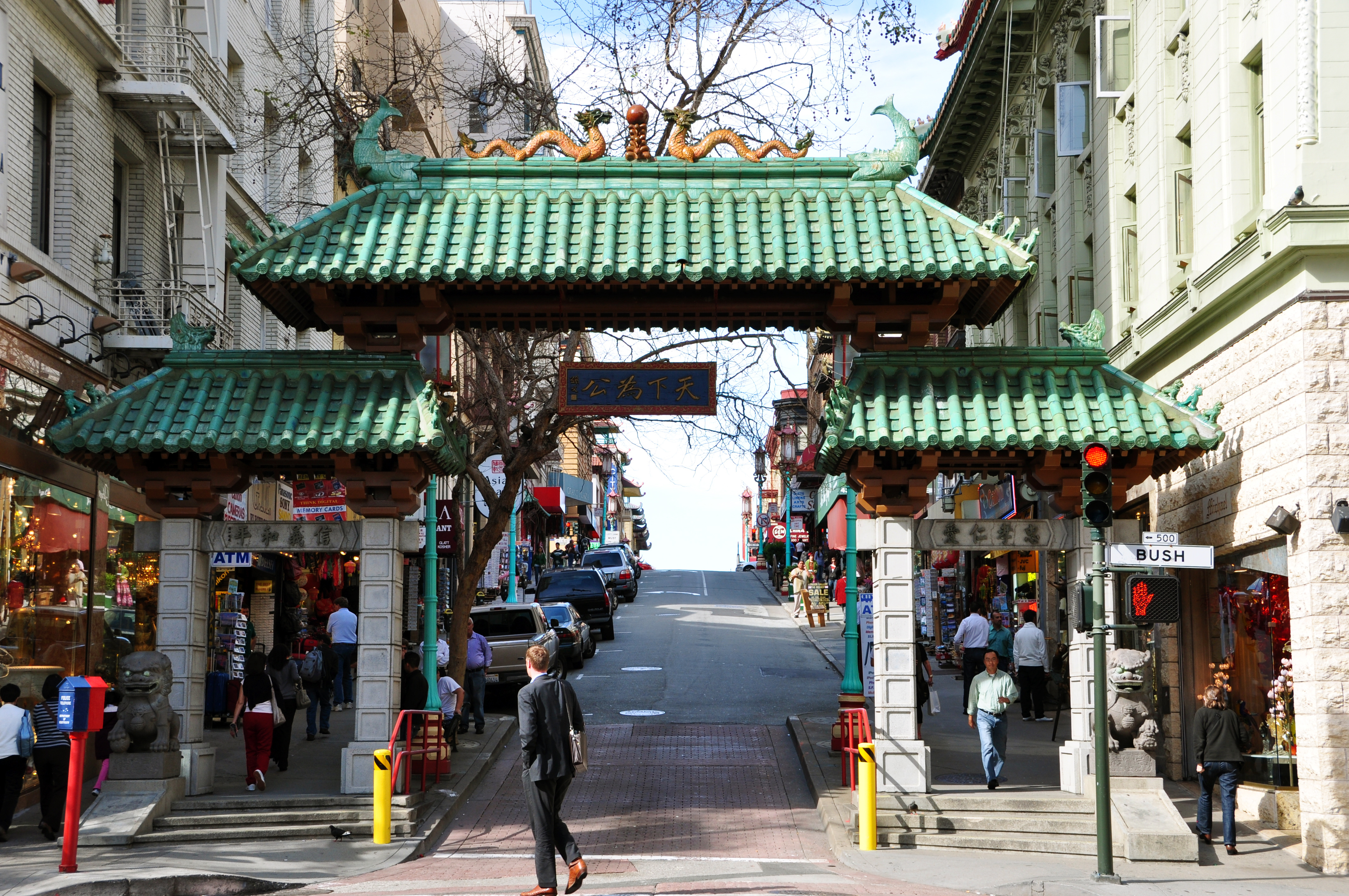
- The gate in 2010
- Interactive map of Dragon Gate
- Location: Straddling Grant just north of Bush, San Francisco
- Coordinates: 37.7907°N 122.4056°W
- Designer: Clayton Lee, Melvin Lee, and Joseph Yee
- Beginning date: August 1968
- Completion date: May 1970
- Opening date: October 18, 1970; 55 years ago

The Dragon Gate ("Chinatown Gate" on some maps) is a south-facing gate at the intersection of Bush Street and Grant Avenue, marking a southern entrance to San Francisco's Chinatown, in the U.S. state of California. Built in 1969 as a gift from the Republic of China (Taiwan) in the style of a traditional Chinese pailou, it became one of the most photographed locations in Chinatown, along with the older Sing Fat and Sing Chong buildings (at Grant and California).

== History ==
=== Temporary gates in San Francisco ===
The Chinese pavilion at the Panama–Pacific International Exposition in San Francisco featured a temporary paifang in 1915. A temporary "Imperial Dragon Gate" was erected across Grant at Clay for the 1941 Rice Bowl Party, a celebration and parade to raise funds for war relief in China. Rice Bowl fundraisers had previously been held in 1938 and 1940. Several temporary "victory arches" were erected in March 1943 to welcome Soong Mei-ling to Chinatown.

=== Tourism ===
In 1953, the Chinese Chamber of Commerce sponsored a bilingual essay contest on how to improve Chinatown business, in the wake of an U.S. embargo on mainland China imports after the People's Republic of China entered the Korean conflict. The winner of the English division, Charles L. Leong, suggested in his essay, among many things, the erection of an authentic archway to Chinatown at Bush and Grant. A later report from 1963 proposing general plans for the downtown area noted that "north of Bush Street, Grant Avenue, to the casual observer and the visitor, is Chinatown", establishing the site's suitability.

In 1956, the Chinatown Improvement Committee, appointed by Mayor George Christopher, made the archway its top priority; the proposal initially included two gates: one at Grant and Bush for Chinatown, and another at Pacific and Kearny for the Barbary Coast red-light district. Two design drawings were shown in December 1956. An early effort to build a gate which started in 1958 was suspended in 1961 after funds and materials ran short, then abandoned in 1962. The budget for both gateways (Chinatown and Barbary Coast) was initially $50,000 each, but the San Francisco Arts Commission killed the Barbary Coast proposal and reduced the budget to $35,000 in 1961. The gate was redesigned in 1963 by Lun Chan, Worley Wong, Morton Rader, and Piero Patri as part of a more ambitious plan to link Chinatown and North Beach via a pedestrian mall and bridge.

=== Design contest ===
"This Gateway appears to favor the pedestrian ... it has an intriguing quality of openness so that one sees the colorful flow of pedestrians and the shops beyond."

— Jury's comments, quoted in October 1967 Architecture/West article

In 1967 Mayor John F. Shelley, who had succeeded Christopher, decided to spur interest by sponsoring a design competition with a budget of $70,000, open to architects of Chinese descent. The contest was won by a team of three Chinese-Americans, architect Clayton Lee of San Mateo, with landscape architects Melvin H. Lee and Joseph Yee, who were inspired by Chinese village architecture of ceremonial gates.

There were more than twenty entrants in the contest, judged by a jury of five architects: Thomas D. Church, Worley Wong, Charles Griffith, and Morton Rader, with Merrill Jew serving as a professional advisor. Second place went to a team of Roger Lee, Daryl Roberson, and Eugene Lew; third to George Meu.

=== Construction and dedication ===
The official groundbreaking ceremony was held in October 1967, but construction did not begin until August 1968. "Extensive modifications" were required to existing utilities. Materials for the gateway, namely 120 artisanal ochre tiles, roofing, and the guardian lions, were fabricated and donated by the Republic of China (Taiwan) in 1969. The project was funded by San Francisco at a cost exceeding $75,000, more than double the original $35,000 budget; the Department of Public Works later reported the construction contract, let to Moreau Construction, was completed at a cost of US$90,889.15 (equivalent to $798,000 in 2025). The ceramic tiles donated by Taiwan were valued at $45,000.

Construction was delayed by bad weather and the relocation of underground utilities. Although the gateway was largely completed by April 1969, it was not dedicated until October 18, 1970, marked by a 1/2-mile long (0.80 km) parade and ceremony attended by a crowd of 3,000, including approximately 50 protesters who denounced the government of Taiwan and the funding of "Moon Gates for Tourists" rather than housing. Mayor Joseph Alioto and Vice-President Yen Chia-kan of the Republic of China (Taiwan) attended the ribbon-cutting ceremony, along with former mayors Robinson and Shelley. It is the first permanent ceremonial gate to be installed in the United States.

=== Restoration and current status ===
The gateway was restored in 1995; work included replacement of roof tiles, upgrading lights, repairing broken steps, installing hand rails, and cleaning and painting.

In 2005, a private effort was proposed to construct a second gate for the northern entrance to Chinatown, at Broadway and Grant. Wilma Pang is credited for the idea of a second gate, inspired by temporary gateways across Commercial for the annual Mid-Autumn Festival starting in 2001.

== Design ==
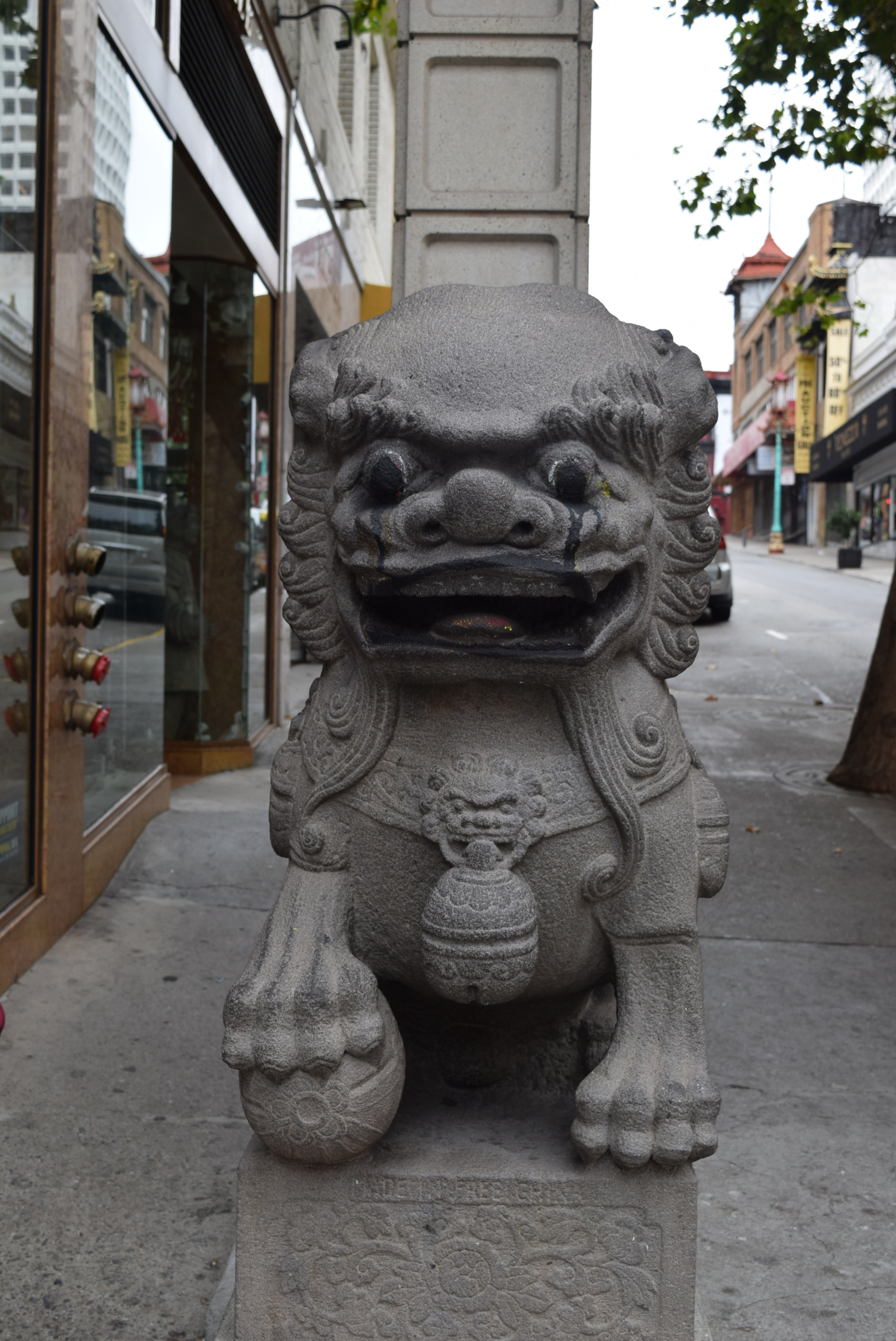
Male lion (west portal)

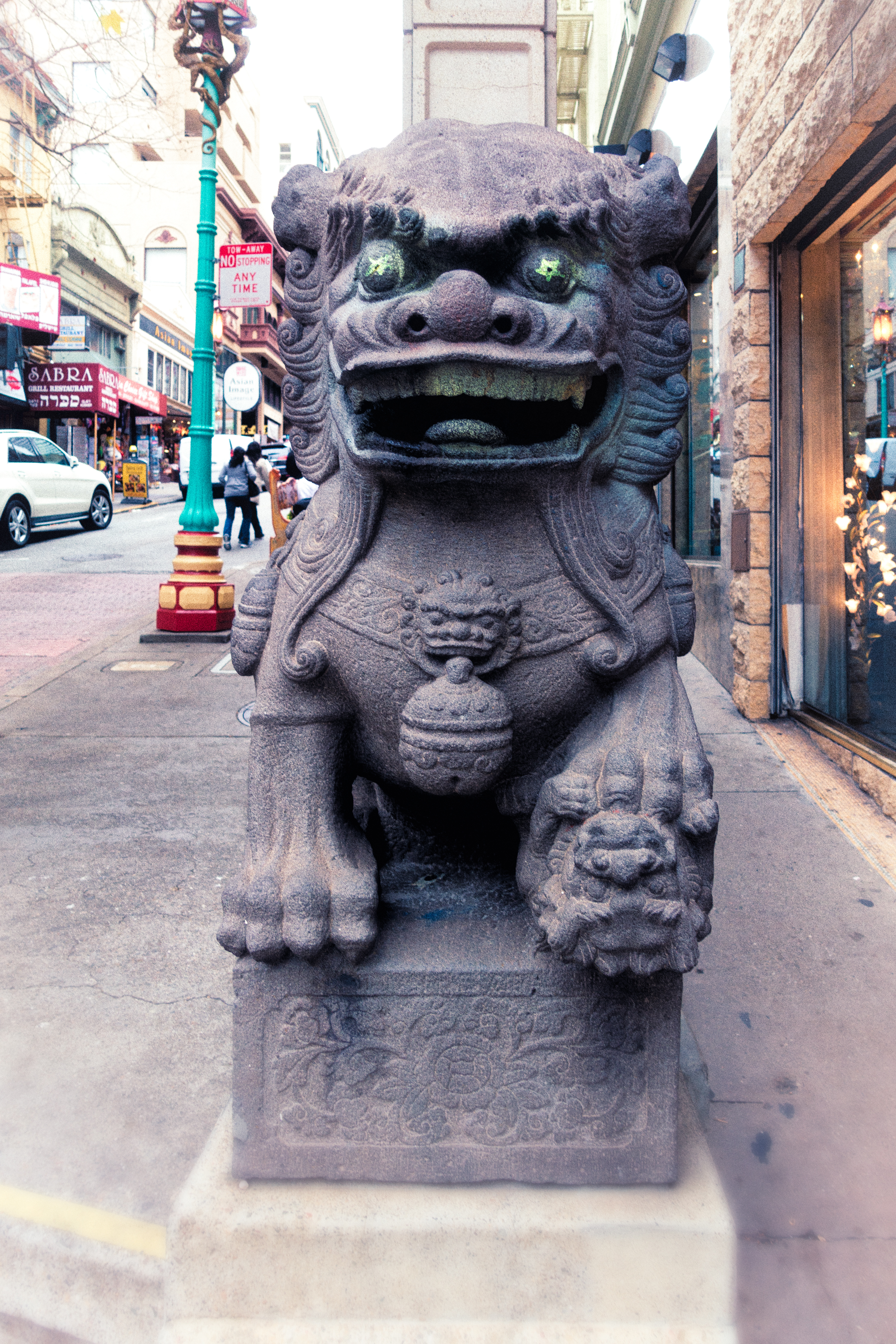
Female lion (east portal)

Chinese guardian lions at Dragon Gate

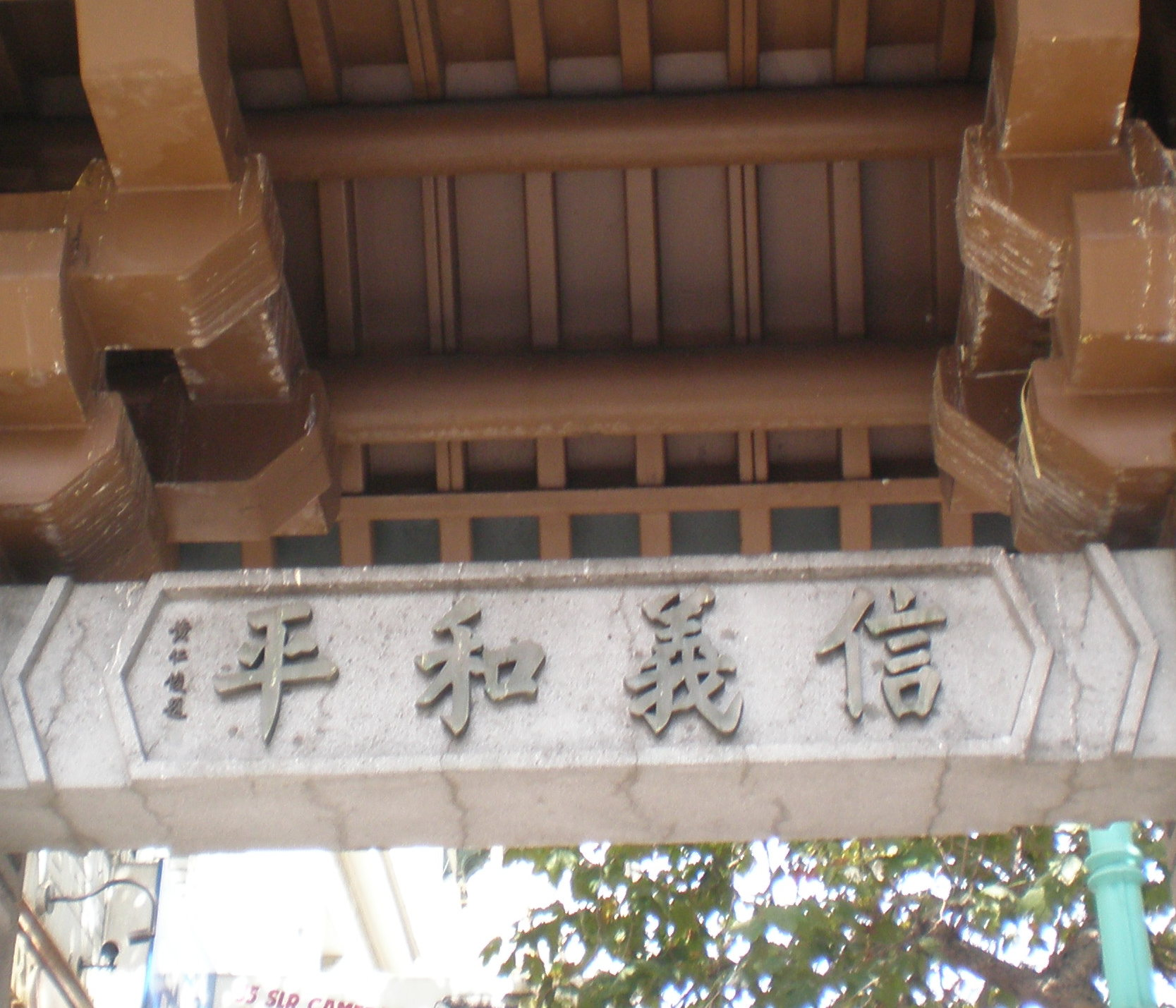
West portal
(信義和平)

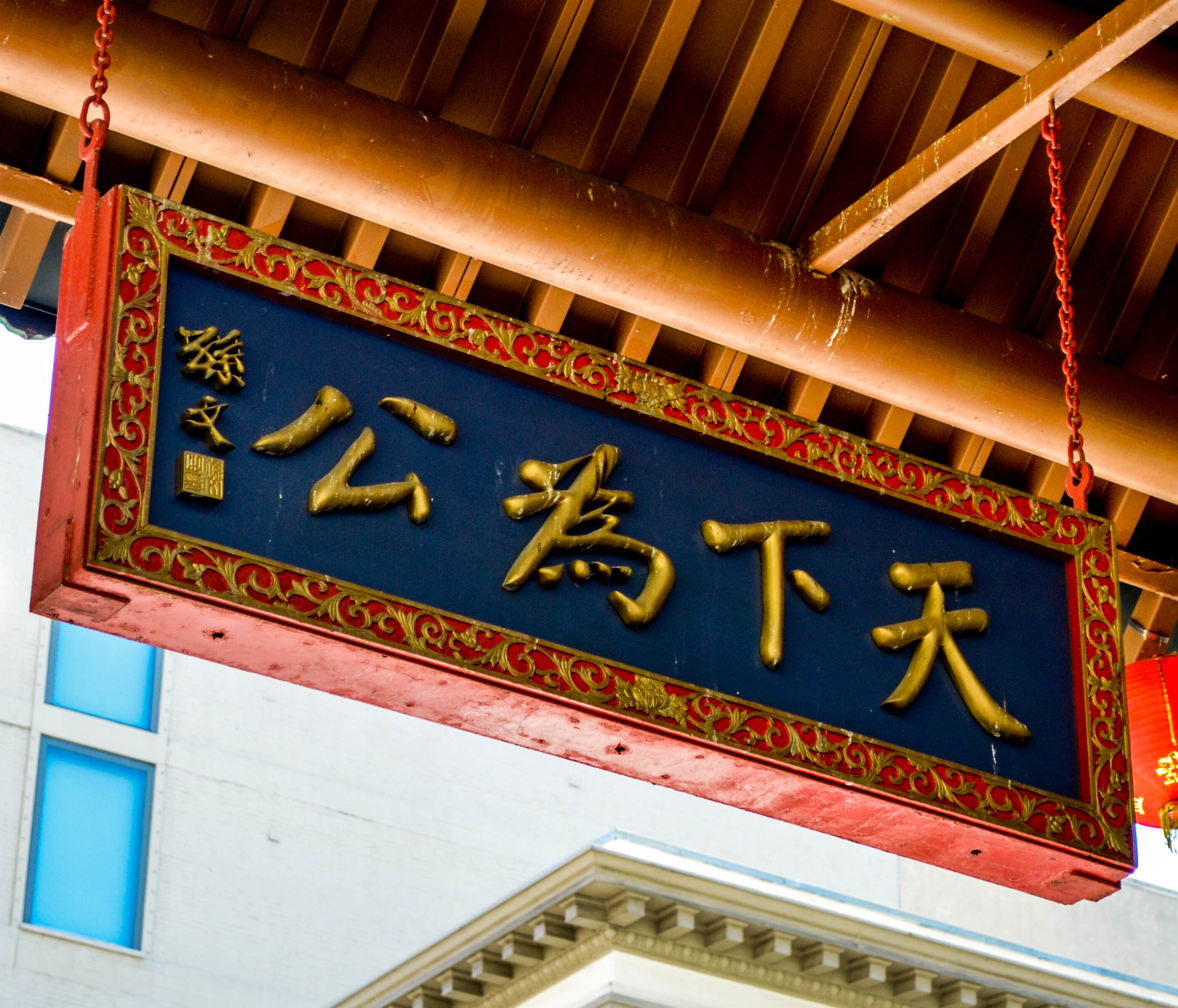
Center portal
(天下為公)

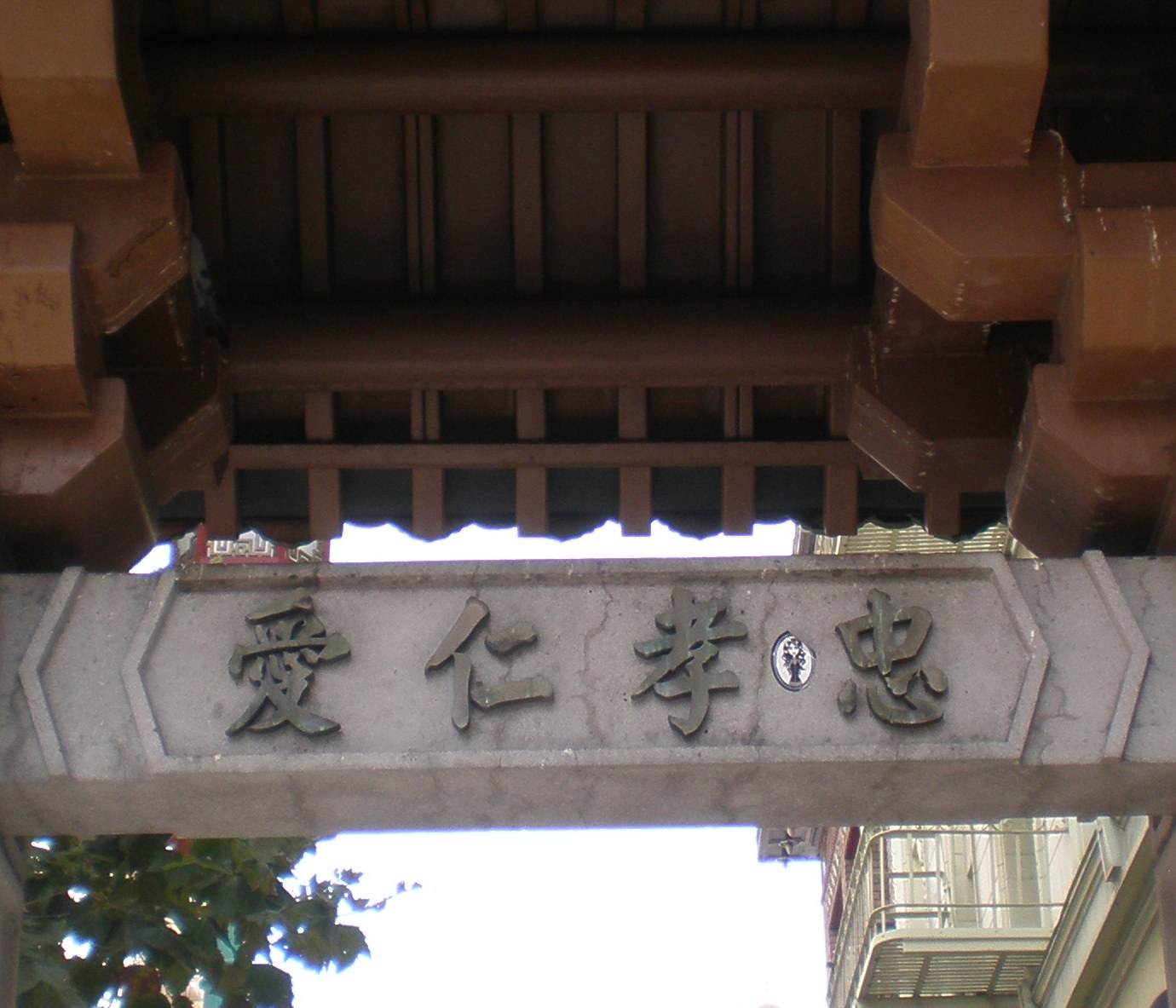
East portal
(忠孝仁愛)

Chinese signs, to be read right to left, above the three portals at Dragon Gate

The Dragon Gate, with its inscription by Sun Yat-sen, has been described as the Republic of China (Taiwan) government's "symbolic claim to Chinatown", before the People's Republic of China gained more influence in Chinatown following Nixon's 1972 visit to China and further normalization of US-China relations.

Like most Chinese ceremonial gates, the Dragon Gate has three portals facing south. The two smaller west and east (pedestrian) portals flank the larger central (automotive) portal, and the structure is supported on stone columns rising from the sidewalks on either side of Grant. The stone columns adhere to standards for Chinese gateways; in contrast, most 'Chinese' gateways constructed in the United States use wooden support columns. Each portal is covered with green tiles, leading north along Grant Avenue into Chinatown.

Three shallow steps lead up to each pedestrian portal. Each pedestrian portal features a stone Chinese guardian lion on the side away from the street. By tradition, the lion pair consists of one male and one female. The male lion, at the west portal, stands with his right fore paw atop a pearl or stone, symbolically guarding the structure or empire. The female lion, at the east portal, stands with her left fore paw atop a juvenile lion, symbolically guarding the occupants within. There are also fish and dragons atop the gate; the fish symbolize prosperity, while the dragons symbolize power and fertility. Between the dragons is a ball, symbolizing the Earth. The lions were cast and carved in Taiwan.

There are four Chinese characters above each portal. Each sign is read from right to left. The central portal sign reads Chinese: 天下為公; pinyin: tiānxià wèi gōng; lit. 'All under heaven is for the good of the people' (a motto attributed to Dr. Sun Yat-sen); the two gates bear signs with the eight virtues: the east portal sign reads 忠孝仁愛; zhōngxiào rén'ài; 'respect (filial piety)', 'love'; and the west reads 信義和平; xìnyì hépíng; 'integrity (confidence)', 'peace'.

== See also ==
- Chinese architecture
