= Asian Americans in Nevada =

Total population
- 378,672

Regions with significant populations
- Enterprise, Spring Valley, Summerlin South, Whitney, Fallon Station, NV, Paradise, Henderson, Reno, North Las Vegas, Las Vegas

Languages
- English • Tagalog • Chinese • Vietnamese • Korean • Japanese

Religion
- Christianity • Buddhism • Hinduism • Islam

Asian Americans are a fast growing ethnic group in the US state of Nevada. As of the 2020 U.S. Census, Asian Americans were 9.1% of the state's population, or 378,672 people.

Filipinos are the largest Asian ethnic group in the state. In Clark County, the four largest Asian groups are Filipino (52%), Chinese (12%), and Native Hawaiian/Pacific Islander and Indian (both 7%). The largest Asian ethnic groups in Nevada are Filipino (168,200), Chinese (53,234), Japanese (28,366), Vietnamese (21,719), Korean (17,743), and Indian (14,602).

== Politics ==
As of 2022, Asians make up about 10 percent of Nevada's eligible voters, comprising a larger share compared to any state except Hawaii and California.

== Demographics ==
Ancestry by origin	Number	%
(Philippines) Filipino	178,160	
(Japan) Japanese	34,133	
(Korea) Koreans	24,576	
(China) Chinese	70,458	
(Vietnam) Vietnamese	19,199	
(Thailand) Thai	7,607	
(Laos) Laotian	3,995	
(Cambodia) Cambodian	2,107	
(India) Indian	16,569	
(Pakistan) Pakistani	2,390	
(Taiwan) Taiwanese	3,400	
(Indonesia) Indonesian	1,216	
(Mongolia) Mongolian	517	
