= American Association of Community Psychiatrists =

The American Association of Community Psychiatrists (AACP) is a United States–based organization of recovery-oriented and recovery focused psychiatrists, psychologists and social workers who primarily work in community-based settings. It was founded in 1985 "to encourage, equip, and empower community and public psychiatrists to develop and implement policies and high-quality practices that promote individual, family and community resilience and recovery." The AACP has published a number of texts on community psychiatry. Its most prominent publication is the peer-reviewed Community Mental Health Journal, published by Springer.
