= The Eighth Promise =

2007 memoir by William Poy Lee

- First edition cover
- Author: William Poy Lee
- Publisher: Rodale Books
- Publication date: April 3, 2007
- ISBN: 1-59486-456-X

The Eighth Promise: An American Son's Tribute to His Toisanese Mother is a memoir by American lawyer William Poy Lee, published in 2007 by Rodale Books. The paperback version was released October 2007. A translation into Mandarin Chinese is in development with the Chinese Professors of American language and Culture Studies.

== Plot synopsis ==
The book interweaves a second generation Chinese American man's reflections on his upbringing in San Francisco in the 1960s and 70s with an oral history shared by his mother, Poy Jen, and her migration from Taishan, Guangdong.

The author's personal memoir is set against the background of San Francisco of the 1960s and 1970s. Lee reflects on his childhood in working class Chinatown, Chinese American participation in the Civil Rights Movement, the Vietnam War, and race relations through the era.

The oral histories begin in the Southern Chinese farming villages of Toisan, where Poy Jen was born in 1926. The author shares interviews conducted in his family's original Toisanese dialect, translated into English. Poy Jen makes her mother eight promises before she leaves war-torn China to join her husband in America in 1950.

Throughout the memoir, Lee traces the role of the promises in his own life and his mother's. The eighth promise serves as the thematic center of the book:

"It is the Eighth Promise -- to live with compassion toward all -- that I think of as the ever-living promise, the one for all of one's days. And this promise, this way -- perhaps arising to the level of a moral path -- strikes me as the distillation of all the wisdom of my kin."

== Publication details ==
- The Eighth Promise: An American Son's Tribute to His Toisanese Mother, William Poy Lee. Rodale Books, 2007, ISBN 978-1594864568

== Themes ==
The multiple levels of the narrative can be summarized as:

1. The author's personal story. As a memoir, the author talked about his humble origins, early education assimilation rites of passage and later activist involvement in high school and the Asian American movement. In later sections, he focused on his heartbreaking fight for his brother's right to a fair trial, when he was wrongfully convicted and sentenced to life in the violent prisons of California.
2. The author's family story. Both his parents came from Taishan, a Southeastern village city in China's Pearl River Delta where thousands of people emigrated to North America from the 1850s through the twentieth century, originally as laborers and after the 1949 Communist assumption of power over mainland China, as refugees. His description of these Taishanese American pioneers succinctly sums up the history of these early Chinese Americans to the United States, a relatively unknown story of initial welcome, and later of ethnic cleansing as thousands were violently driven out from towns and cities throughout the West into a few urban enclaves that came to be known as Chinatowns.
3. San Francisco Chinatown’s evolution as a community with its capability of passing down positive traditions and providing institutional stability to its besieged community as well as its dark side of enforcing a Jim Crow system and as patrons and protectors of organized crime and of police and political bribery.
4. The author's defiance at being a stereotyped "model minority." After achieving goals in the corporate world as an international lawyer, the author reveals that he started to reflect on the meaning in life, the dual cultural tracks of his mother's Taishanese values and wisdom and of being a fully assimilated and successful American. He decided to write full-time and part of that included traveling back to China with his mother in 2000 to visit his ancestral village. The author now devotes part to his writing towards improving ethnic and cultural understanding between the two major cultures of America and China. Consequently, he spent three years finishing this book.

== Awards and recognition ==
Media outlets such as NPR, Fora TV and universities such as University of Kansas have invited the author for speaking engagements and interviews. Although the book primarily depicts the life of a Chinese American, many of the most avid and vocal readers are from other ethnicities such as Hispanics and Italian Americans. In late October 2007, the book won the 2007 PEN Oakland/Josephine Miles Literary Award for outstanding and original contribution to multicultural literature. The city of Ann Arbor, Michigan selected the book for its 2008 One city one book program, Ann Arbor/Ypsilanti Reads.
