= Eng Suey Sun Association =

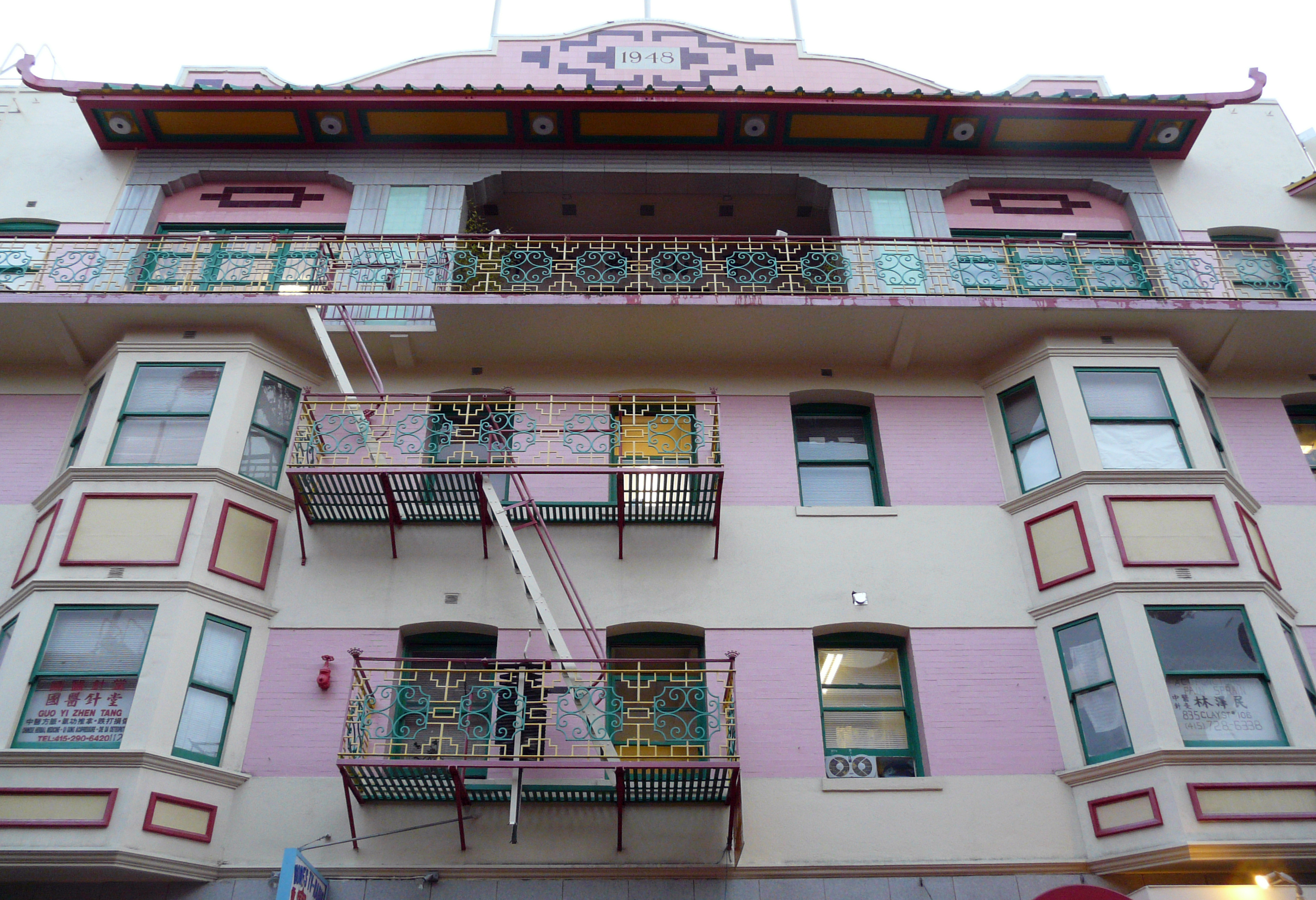
Upper storeys of the Eng Family Benevolent Association building in Chinatown, San Francisco at 53 Waverly Pl

Eng Family Benevolent Association, also referred to as Eng Suey Sun Association (Chinese: 伍胥山公所; Jyutping: ng5 seoi1 saan1 gung1 so2; pinyin: Wǔxūshān Gōngsuǒ), was founded by members of the Eng (伍) clan, who emigrated from China to various parts of the world while seeking out a better life (References 1). Note that the Chinese surname 伍 is transliterated to a number of forms. Examples are: Wu, Ng, Eng, Ing, or Ang.

Eng Family Associations around the world are often named in honor of the common ancestor of the Eng (Wu) Clan from Suzhou China, Wu Zixu (伍子胥), referring to a shrine erected for him on a mountain, 胥山, with Toishanese transliteration, Eng Suey Sun (Reference 2). Today, there are a number of Eng Family Benevolent Associations or fraternal societies all over the world. They are located in Taishan Guangdong and Hong Kong, People's Republic of China; Jakarta and Medan, Indonesia; Kuala Lumpur and Penang, Malaysia; Yangon, Myanmar; Manila, Philippines; Calgary, Ottawa, Toronto, and Vancouver, Canada; and Taipei, Taiwan.

In the United States, the National Eng Family Benevolent Association has its business office at 53 Waverly Place, San Francisco, California, 94108.

== Branches ==
The Eng Suey Sun Association has additional branches in North America, including in:

- Boston, Massachusetts - Located at 22 Tyler Street (617) 482-2163 (Reference 4)
- Chicago, Illinois - Located at 245 W Alexander Street (312) 326–0221
- Los Angeles, California - Located at 418 Cottage Home Street (323) 227–8265
- New York, New York - Located at 5 Mott Street 212-267-6556
- San Francisco, California - Located at 53 Waverly Pl 415-362-6732
- Seattle, Washington - Located at 815 S Weller Street 206-624-2796
- Toronto, Ontario - Located at 14 D'Arcy Street 416-977-3991
- Vancouver, BC - Located at 389½ E. Hastings Street 604-681-8866
