= Yellowworld =

Asian American political organization

Yellowworld.org is an Asian American political organization founded in January 2002. It began as a community blog for Asian Americans on LiveJournal and launched its own domain on May 8, 2002. By 2007 its website had attracted approximately 6,500 members and published over 480,000 posts. The forums are overseen by a group of administrators and moderators.

== Online grassroots advocacy ==
In May 2003, Yellowworld.org began Project SARSfund, an online charity to purchase medical supplies and equipment for health workers in China battling the SARS epidemic.

In February 2003, Yellowworld.org joined other Asian American advocacy organizations in denouncing U.S. Congressman Howard Coble's endorsement of the internment of Japanese Americans during World War II, launching RemoveCoble!, a call for his resignation as Chair of the House Subcommittee on Crime, Terrorism and Homeland Security.

In November 2002, Yellowworld.org helped launch Justice for Anna Guo, a campaign by Yellowworld.org, the Chinese American Citizens Alliance (CACA), the Asian Pacific American Bar Association of Greater Los Angeles (APABA) and Assemblymember Judy Chu (D-Monterey); its purpose was to draw attention to the wrongful prosecution of Anna Guo, a fourteen-year-old Chinese-American foster child, who was shot three times in the stomach by a rookie officer yet charged with felony assault because she was holding a small knife at the time she was shot. Numerous accounts confirmed she had been contemplating suicide and had taken the knife to harm herself. The campaign sought to have the officer who fired the shots investigated.

In October 2002 Yellowworld.org launched the online advocacy campaign Project Anti-Disguise to raise awareness of and protest against the costume manufacturer Disguise, Inc. and its product Kung Fool, a mask based on a racist caricature of persons of East Asian descent. In only eight days, Yellowworld mobilized over 8,300 people to sign the campaign's online petition calling for the mask's recall while generating nationwide television, print, and radio media coverage. By the end of the eighth day the company issued a nationwide recall and major resellers such as Walmart, Spencer Gifts and Party City pulled the product from their shelves.
