= Gin Family Association =

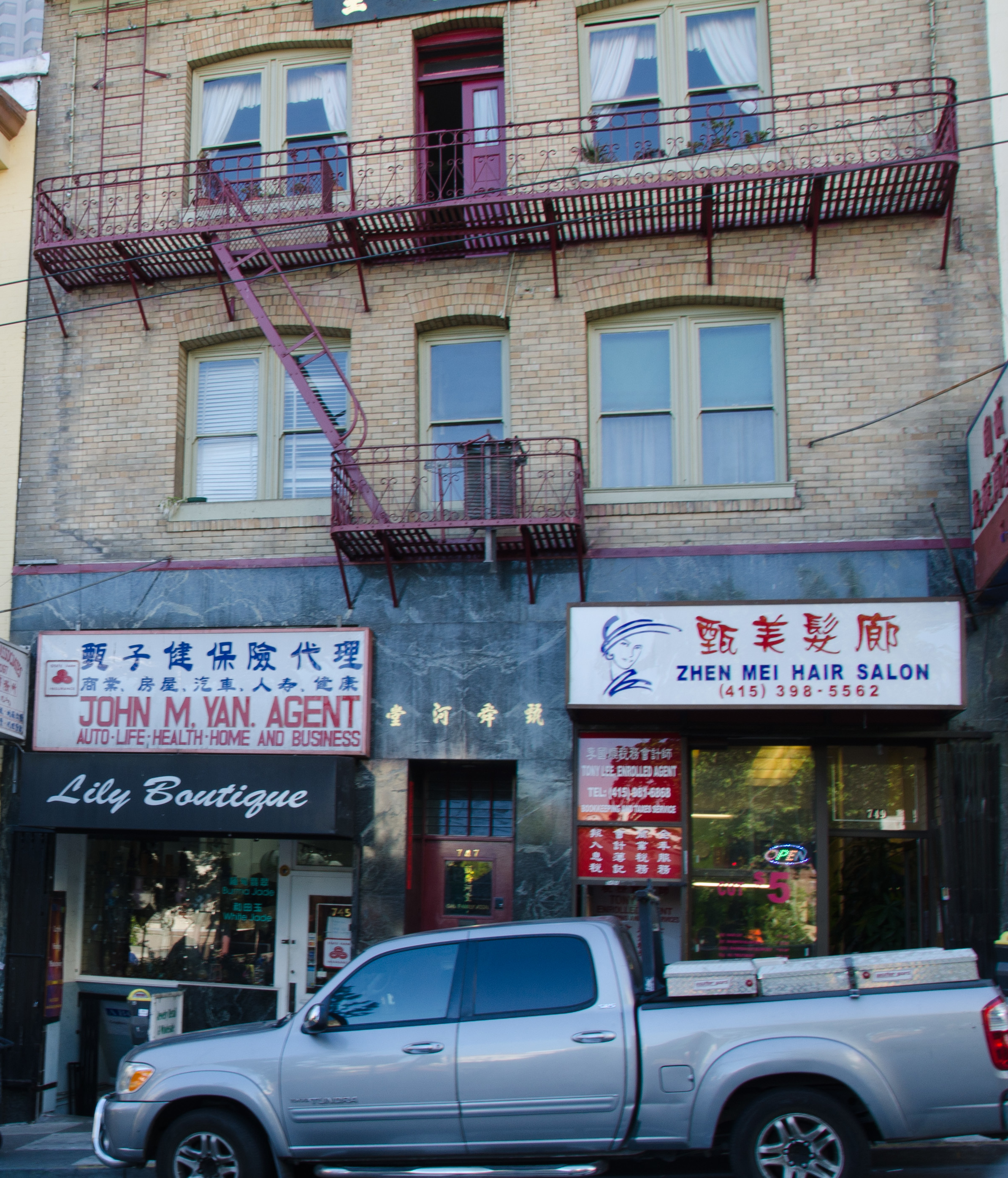
Gin Sun Hall Benevolent Association at 747 Clay

Gin Sun Hall Benevolent Association (Chinese: 甄舜河堂; Jyutping: jan1 seon3 ho4 tong4; pinyin: Zhēnshùnhé Táng), also referred to as the Gin Family Association, was founded by members of the Gin (甄) clan, who emigrated from China to various parts of the world, seeking a better life.

The Chinese surname 甄 is transliterated to a number of forms, including Chin, Gyn, Gean, Gen, Gene, Jen, Jin, Ying, Yan, Yen, Yun and Zhen.

== Overview ==
Gin Family Associations around the world are usually named in honor of the common ancestor of the Clan from the Pearl River Delta of China, Gin Sun Hall (甄舜河). Today, there are a number of Gin Sun Hall Associations or fraternal societies all over the world. They are located in Guangdong and Hong Kong in the People's Republic of China, Makassar (Indonesia), Singapore, Manila, Philippines, Vancouver, British Columbia, San Francisco, New York City, Boston and Los Angeles.

Located at 747 Clay Street in San Francisco, California, the Sun Hall Benevolent Association in San Francisco was established in the 1930s under the Corporate Laws of the State of California for the purposes of mutual assistance and support for new migrants coming and adjusting to the harsh environment in a foreign land.

== See also ==
- List of Chinese American associations
