= American Academy of Cardiovascular Perfusion =

Professional association in the USA

The American Academy of Cardiovascular Perfusion (AACP) is a professional association located in Fogelsville, PA, that aims to increase knowledge of cardiovascular perfusion by providing educational resources to its members. The organization was founded in 1979. The AACP was organized in 1979 by Earl Lawrence, who was encouraged to establish the organization by Thomas Wharton.
