= Ross Alley =

Alley in San Francisco, California, US

Coordinates: 37°47′43″N 122°24′26″W

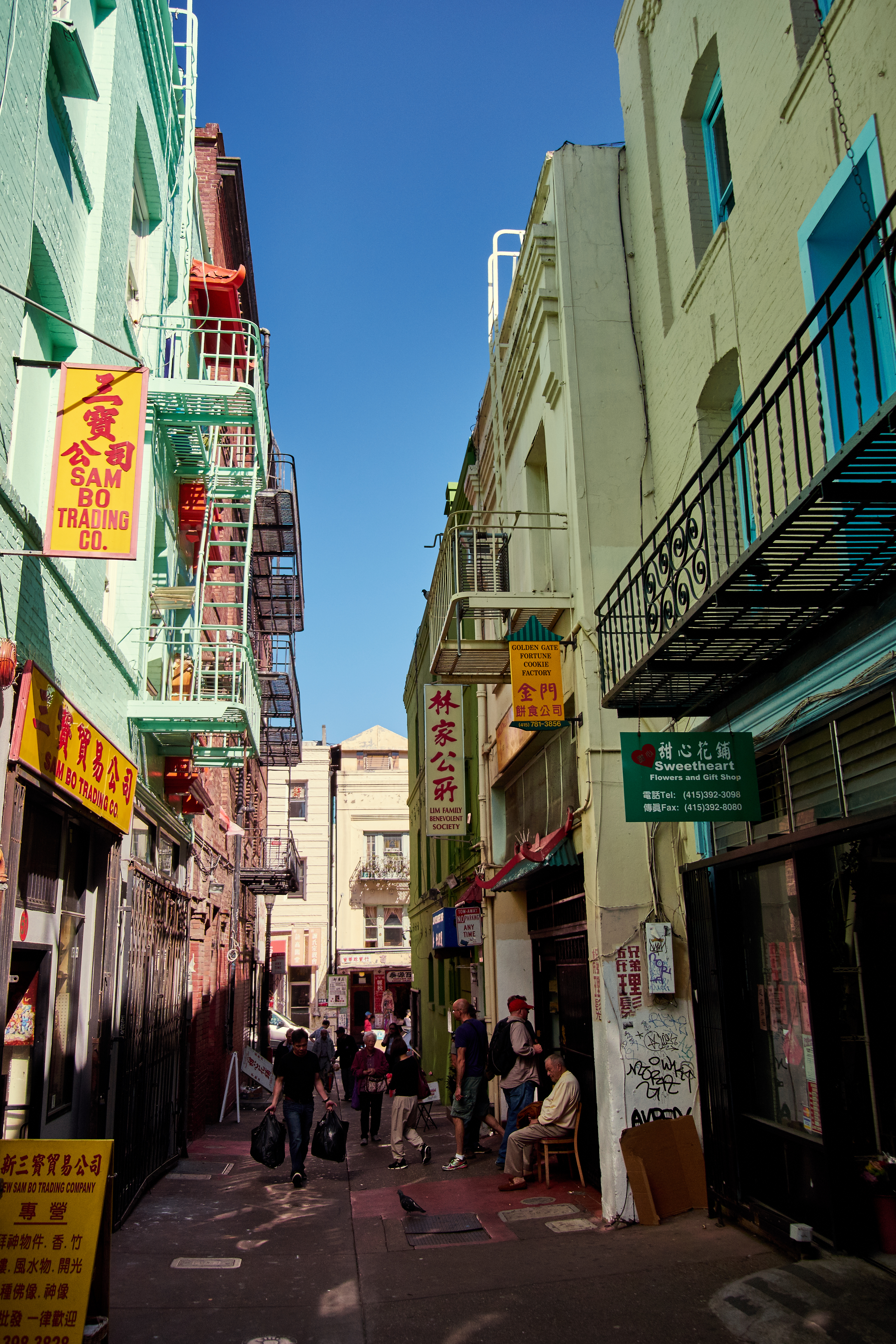
- Ross Alley between Jackson and Washington (2014)
- Interactive map of Alley location
- Location: San Francisco, California
- South end: Washington Street in Chinatown
- North end: Jackson Street in Chinatown

Ross Alley is a north–south alley in San Francisco's Chinatown. Ross Alley lies between and is parallel to Stockton and Grant, running one city block between Jackson and Washington.

== History ==
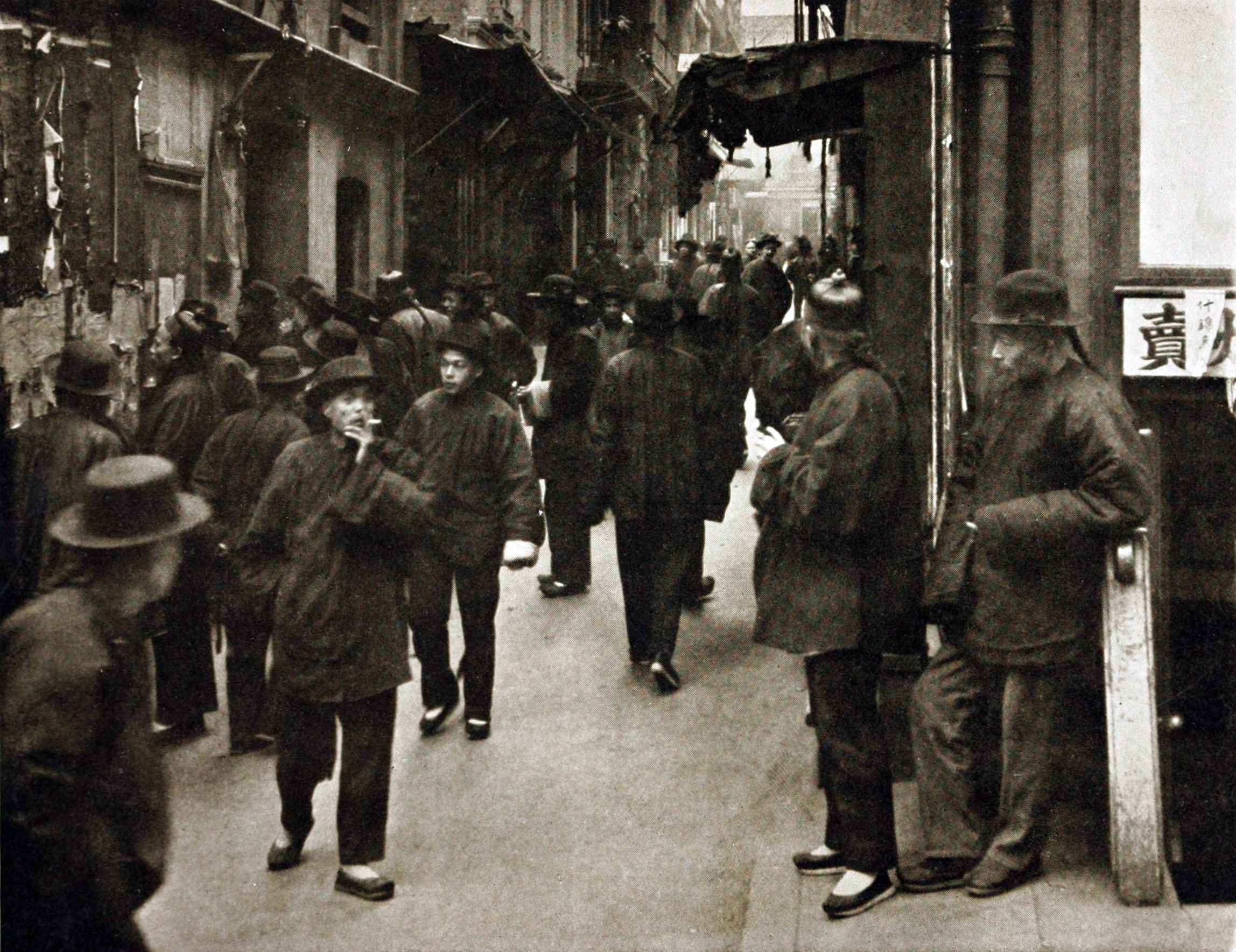
The Street of Gamblers (Ross Alley) by Arnold Genthe (1898)

Ross Alley was initially built in 1849, adjacent to the house of the pioneer merchant Charles L. Ross, from whom the name is derived. The original name was Stout's Alley, however, for Dr. Arthur Breese Stout, who had purchased Ross's house, which stood near the present-day corner of Washington and Ross Alley. The oldest alley in San Francisco, Ross Alley was considered to be one of the main locations for brothels, especially during the days of the Barbary Coast. Women were brought to the slave dens and served against their will.

Ross Alley was also notorious for highbinders and gambling dens in the late 19th and early 20th centuries. Several establishments in "the stronghold for gambling dens" featured iron doors, which were banned by local ordinance in 1889. In several instances, the Chinese population was victimized by people impersonating police officers, and in at least one instance, police protection of gambling led to the removal of an officer.

According to a 1901 article, "Ross [A]lley is thought to be the spot in San Francisco where the souls of the dead can most easily come and where the evil spirits are forbidden to exercise their powers".

== Businesses ==
The main entrance to the Golden Gate Fortune Cookie Company, a popular tourist destination, is located in Ross Alley. The building used to house a sewing factory, owned by Henry Pon Lee, who vacated the premises during the late 1960s.

In the early 20th century, the Siberia Club, at 25-27-29 Ross Alley, run by Yee Mee, "king of the Chinatown gamblers" and head of the Hop Sing Tong, was one of the more notable gaming establishments. A raid on September 28, 1912, netted 46 Chinese, and another raid just days later arrested another 50 gamblers, despite a September 17 injunction prohibiting police interference.

In 1909, the San Francisco Call rallied voters for William Henry Crocker as Mayor over P. H. McCarthy, who was predicted to be too tolerant of Chinatown, as "Mar Len Geet's brothel in Ross alley is a hotbed of P. H. McCarthy enthusiasm."

== In media ==
- Ross Alley was filmed in Indiana Jones and the Temple of Doom, Big Trouble in Little China, and The Karate Kid Part II.
- Jun Yu, who runs Yu's Barber Shop and plays the erhu in Ross Alley, had a role in the movie The Pursuit of Happyness, which was filmed and set in the Bay Area.
