= Jackson Street (San Francisco) =

Street in San Francisco, California, United States

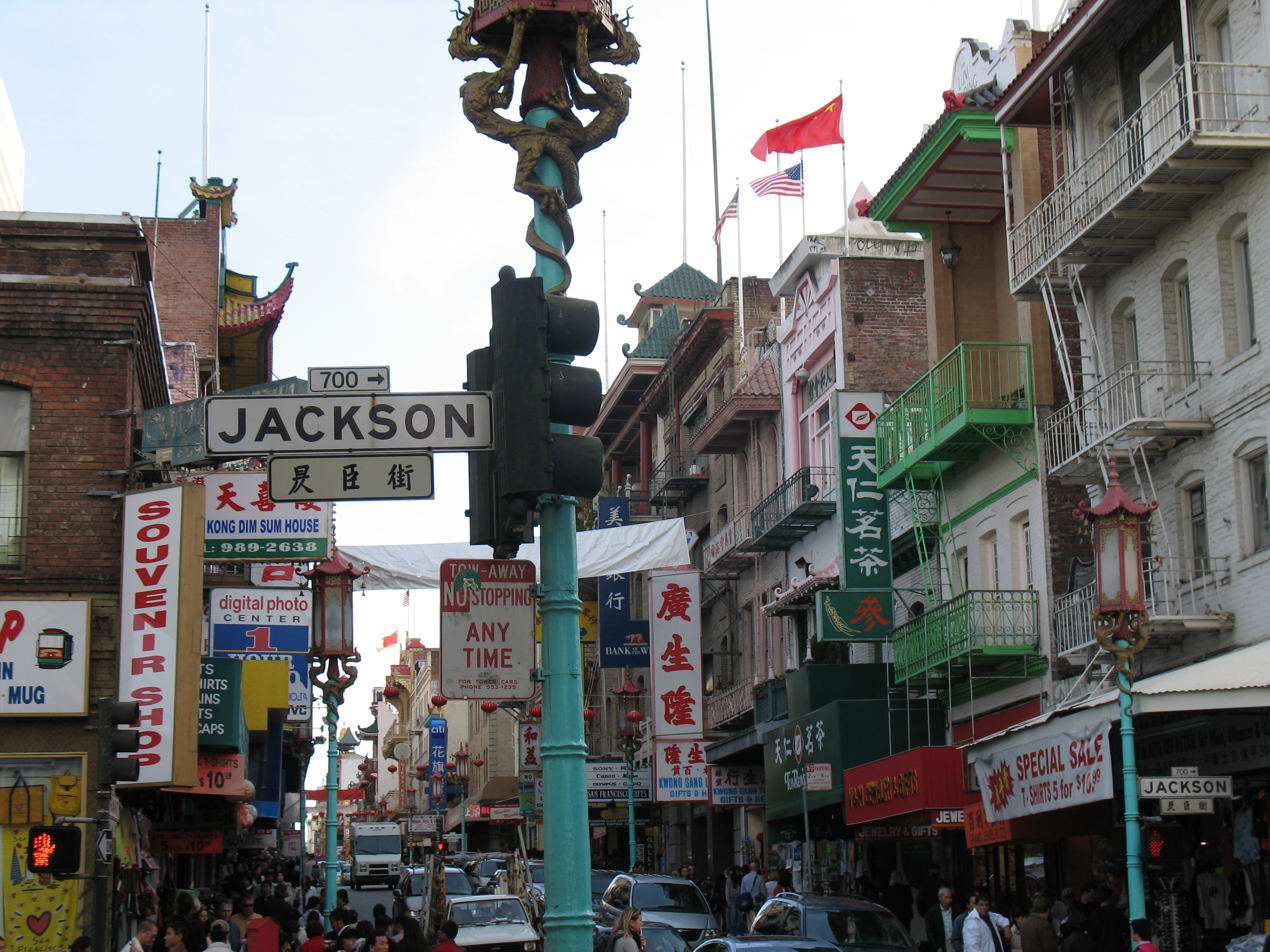
- Jackson Street / Grant Avenue in November 2006 in Chinatown
- Interactive map of Jackson Street
- Location: San Francisco, California
- West end: Arguello BIvd
- Major junctions: US 101 (Van Ness Avenue) in Nob Hill; Grant Avenue in Chinatown
- East end: Drumm Street

Jackson Street is a street in San Francisco, California, running through the Pacific Heights, Nob Hill, Chinatown and Jackson Square districts of the city. It runs between Pacific Avenue and Washington Street, beginning at Arguello Boulevard to the south of the Presidio Golf Course and ending at Drumm Street, to the west of Pier 3, near Sydney G. Walton Square.

== History ==
In the fall of 1863, Mohave chief Irataba created a storm when he walked down Jackson Street, dressed in what Arthur Woodward described as "the full civilized costume" typical of European Americans, which Irataba soon preferred to traditional Mohave clothing. The press documented his every movement and wrote extensively about his physical size and strong features. In February 1894, the two cable car lines on the street were extended. In the 1990s, the Jackson Street Boys criminal gang gained notoriety.

=== Jackson Square Historic District ===
The section of Jackson Street between Montgomery and Sansome Avenues is of historical interest. It contains several 19th-century buildings that were built after the 1851 city fire and survived the 1906 earthquake. The Lucas, Turner & Co. Bank, also known as the "Sherman's Bank", was opened by William Tecumseh Sherman on the corner of Jackson and Montgomery in 1854. Ghirardelli Chocolate operated a factory in Nos. 415-431 between 1853 and 1894. The Hotaling Whiskey Warehouse, at Nos. 451-455, was built in 1866. In the aftermath of the earthquake, the Army decided not to demolish the buildings on this block for fear of detonating the barrels of whiskey in the warehouse, which would cause an explosion. The Hotaling Building at 466 Jackson Street was built in 1866.

== Notable landmarks ==
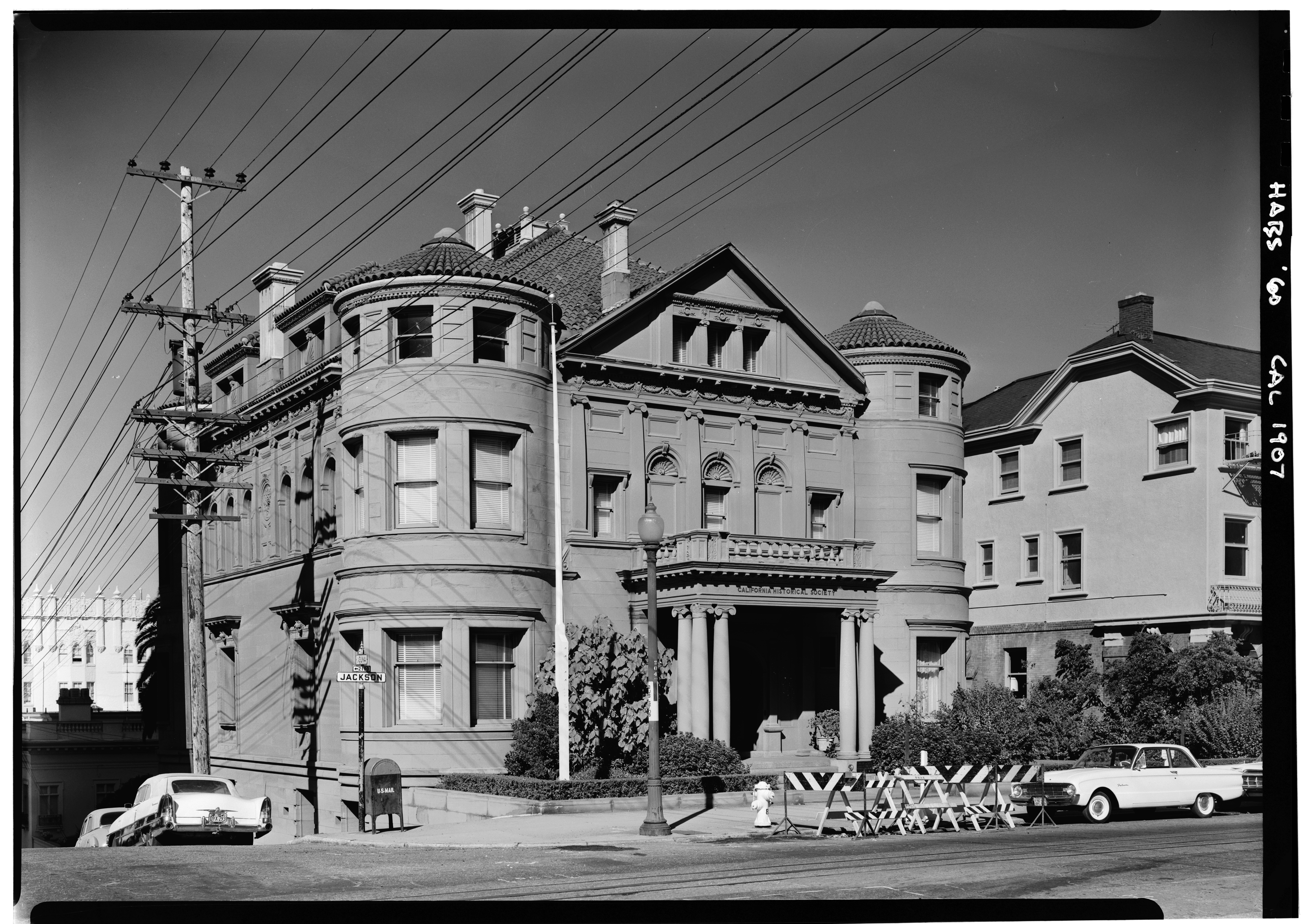
Whittier Mansion, 2090 Jackson Street

Notable buildings along the road from east to west include the Eureka Theatre, International Hotel Manilatown Center, Golden Gate Fortune Cookie Factory, the San Francisco Chinese Hospital, Han Palace Antique and Art Center, Jackson Market, the German Consulate, Jackson Court, the San Francisco Public Montessori, Calvary Presbyterian Church, Whittier Mansion and San Francisco University High School. In addition, the Academy of Art University owns and operates a building on the street for graduate apartments.
