= Jack Kerouac Alley =

Alleyway in California, United States

Coordinates: 37.7975°N 122.4067°W

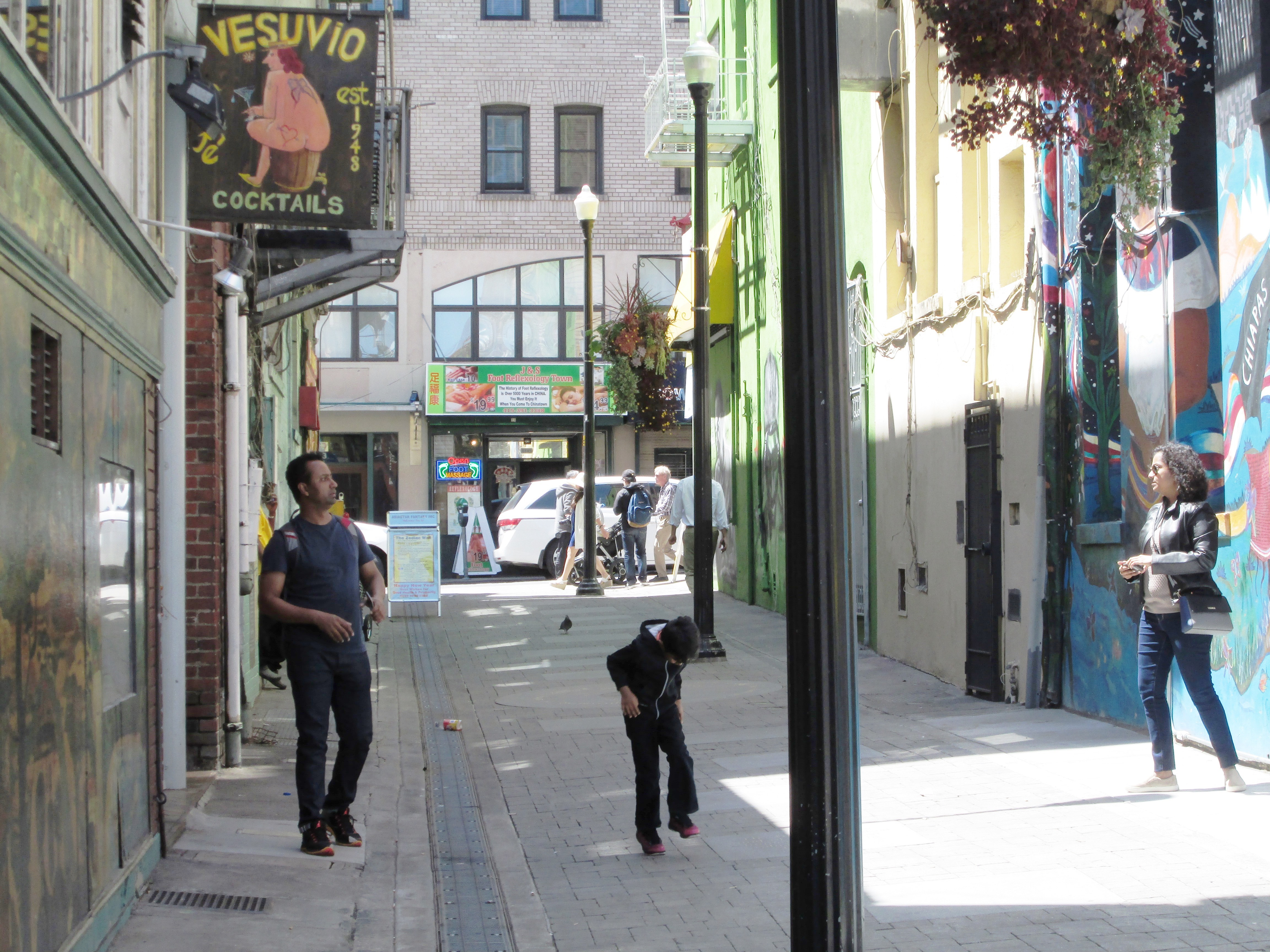
- The alley as seen from Columbus Avenue, 2017
- Interactive map of Jack Kerouac Alley
- Namesake: Jack Kerouac
- Location: San Francisco, California, U.S.
- West end: Grant Avenue in Chinatown
- East end: Columbus Avenue in North Beach

Jack Kerouac Alley, formerly Adler Alley or Adler Place, is a one-way alleyway in San Francisco, California, that connects Grant Avenue in Chinatown, and Columbus Avenue in North Beach. The alley is named after Jack Kerouac, a Beat Generation writer who used to frequent the pub and bookstore adjacent to the alley. The alley continues across Columbus Ave, but the name changes to William Saroyan Alley there, named after another famous resident writer of San Francisco, who won the Pulitzer Prize as well as an Academy Award.

== History ==
The alley had commonly been used for garbage dumping and a shortcut for trucks before poet Lawrence Ferlinghetti, who was the co-founder of City Lights Bookstore, presented his idea in 1988 to the San Francisco Board of Supervisors to transform the alleyway. The project involved repaving the alley, making it a pedestrian walkway, and installing new street lights. The new look alley was reopened to the public in March 2007 and a ceremony was held in April 2007 to celebrate the reopening. The alley is now known for its engraved Western and Chinese writing, by such writers as John Steinbeck, Maya Angelou, Ferlinghetti, and Kerouac himself.

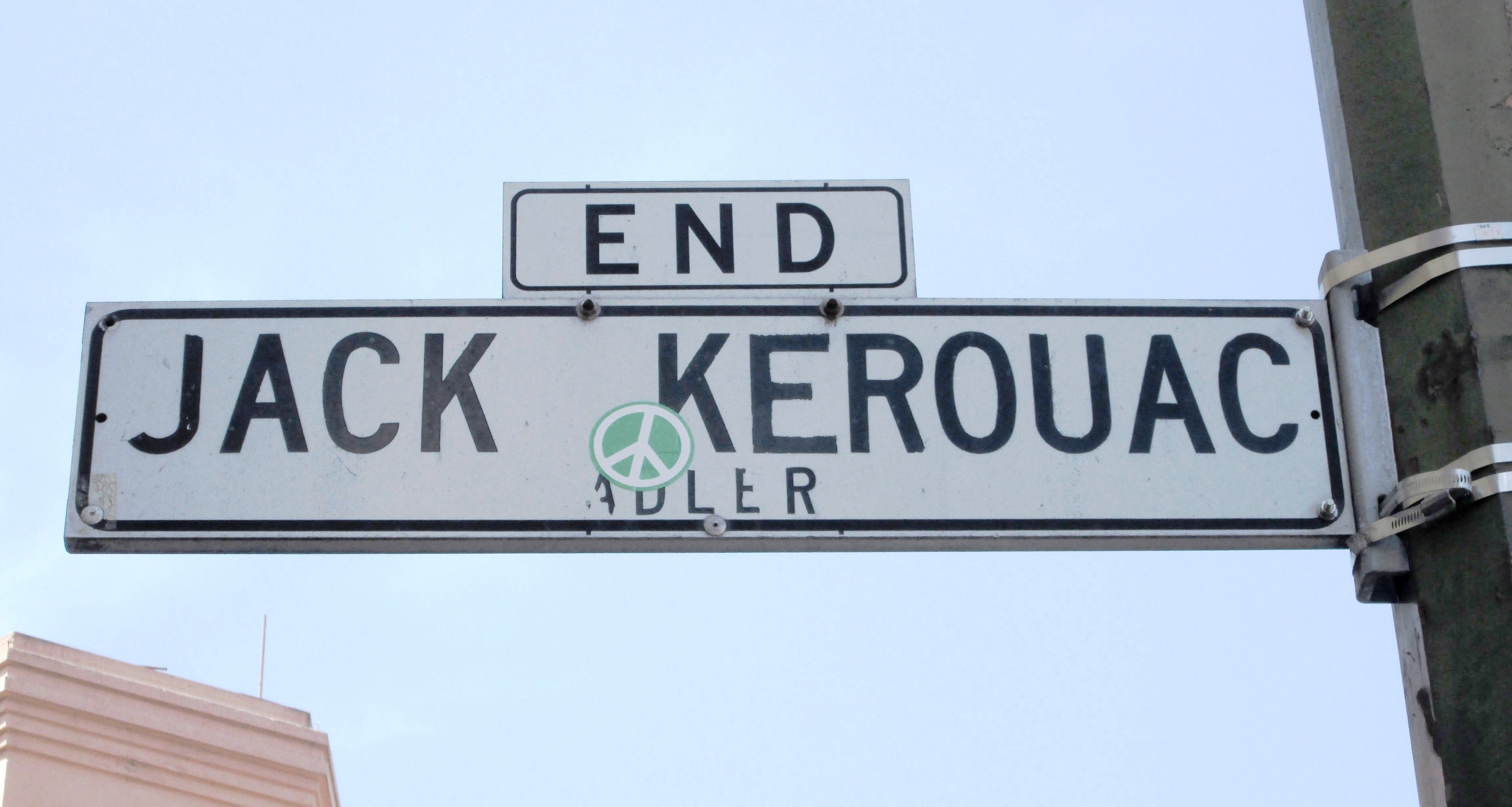
Street sign in 2017

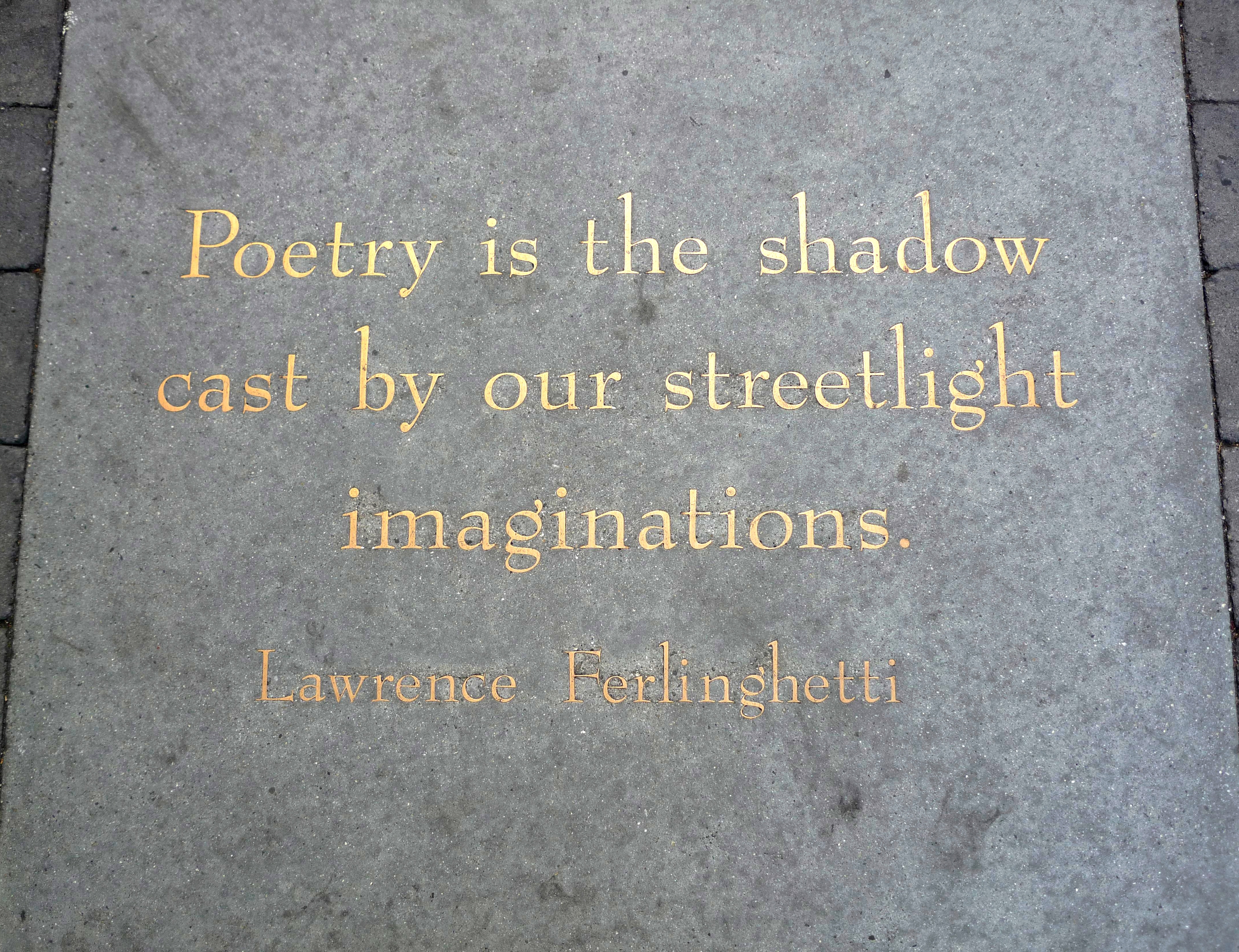
Plaque with a quote from Lawrence Ferlinghetti's poem in Jack Kerouac Alley

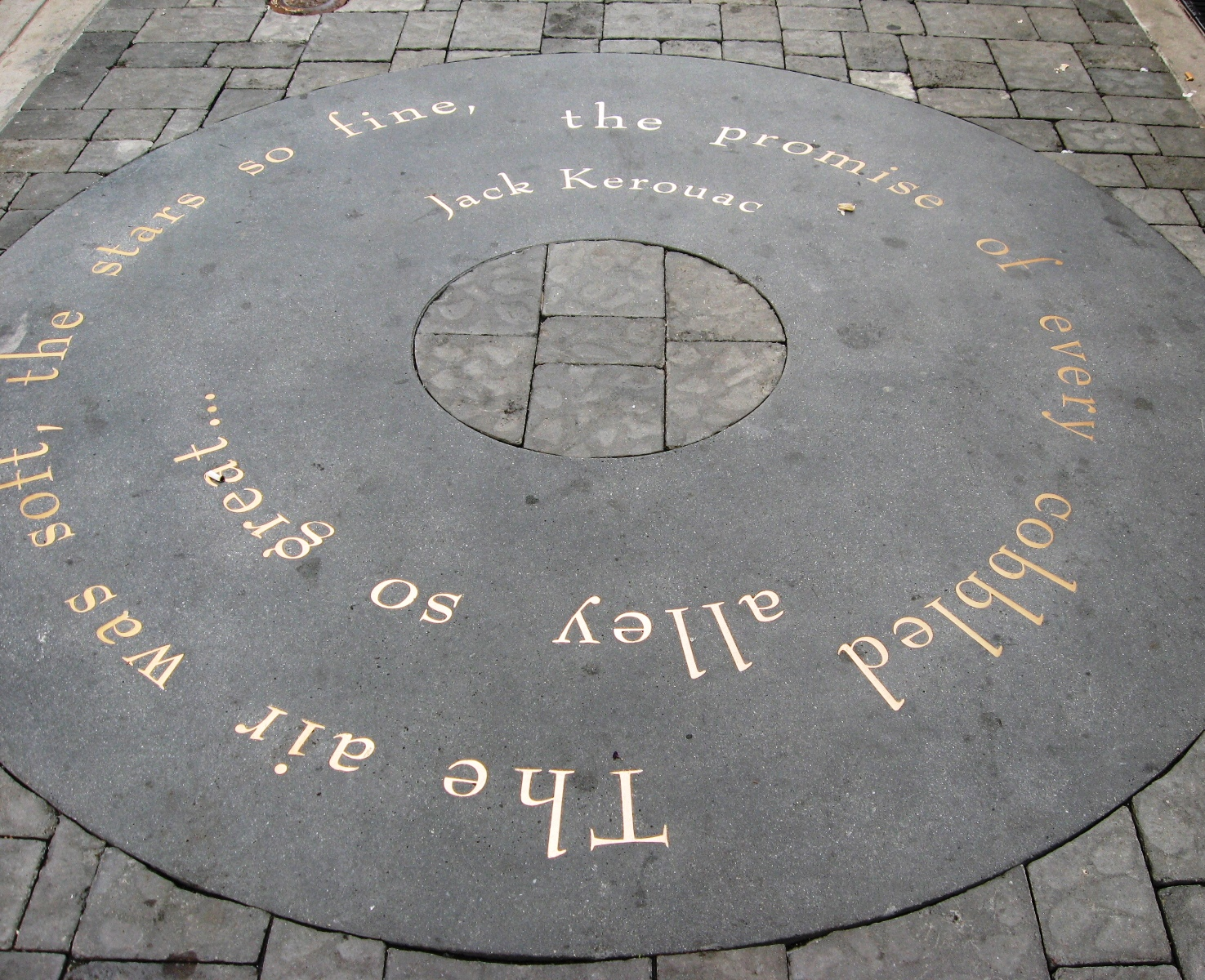
Plaque with Jack Kerouac's quote

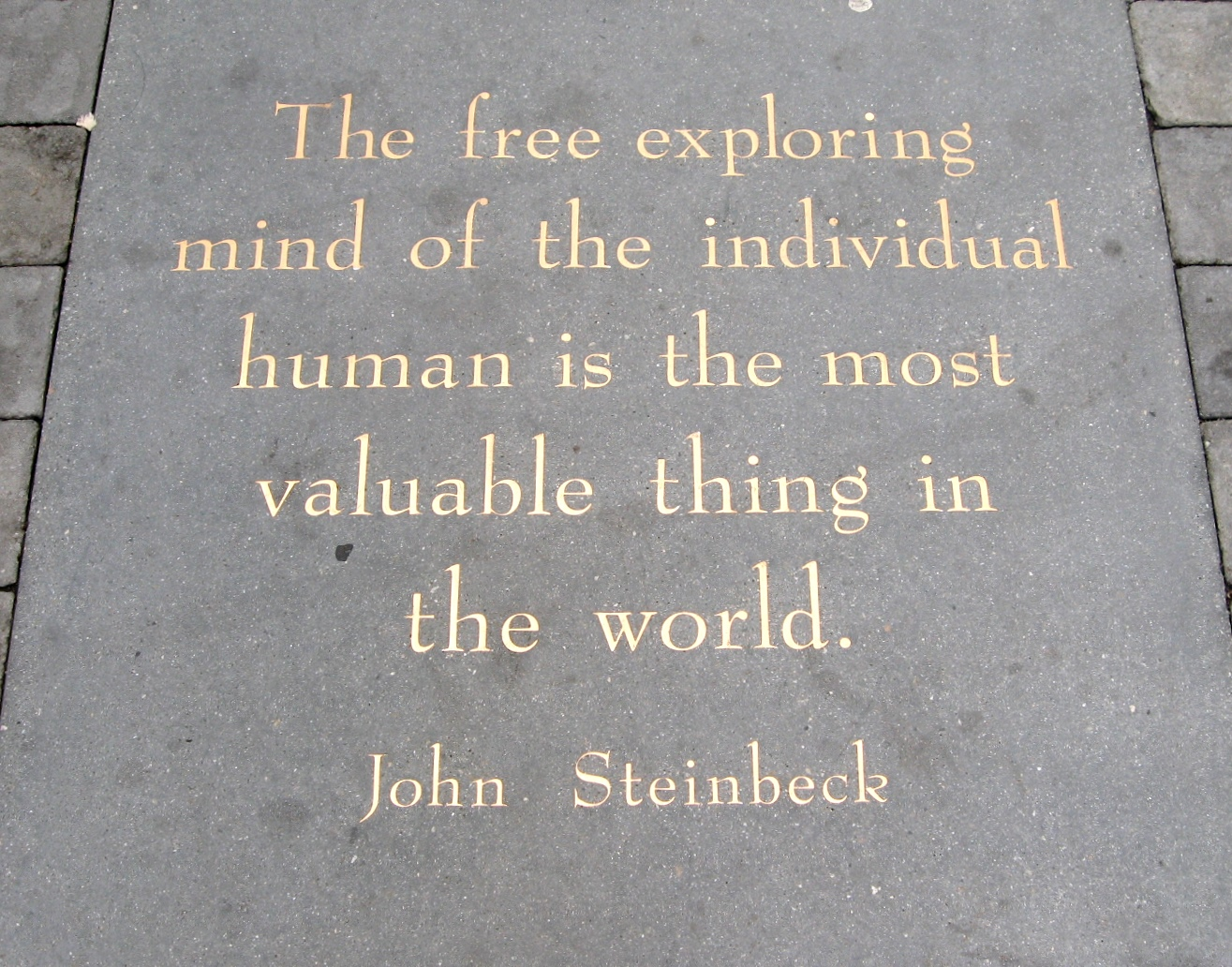
Plaque with John Steinbeck's quote
