= Asian American Curriculum Project =

Nonprofit organization in San Mateo, California

The Asian American Curriculum Project (AACP) is a nonprofit organization based in San Mateo which was created in 1969 to promote Asian and Asian-American culture and writing. The organization publishes books and media on the topic of Asian people's experiences, focusing on their experience in the United States. It also has a bookstore.

== About ==
The Asian American Curriculum Project (AACP) is a nonprofit organization based in San Mateo, California. AACP educates the public about Asian and Asian-American experiences through the publication of books, music and media. There is also a physical bookstore selling AACP books in San Mateo.

AACP was founded in 1969. The organization was formerly named the Japanese American Curriculum Project (JACP) and was created by teachers from San Mateo and led by Florence Makita Yoshiwara. Originally, JACP was sponsored by the San Mateo City School District. Volunteers ran the organization.
