= Golden Gate Fortune Cookie Company =

Bakery in San Francisco, California

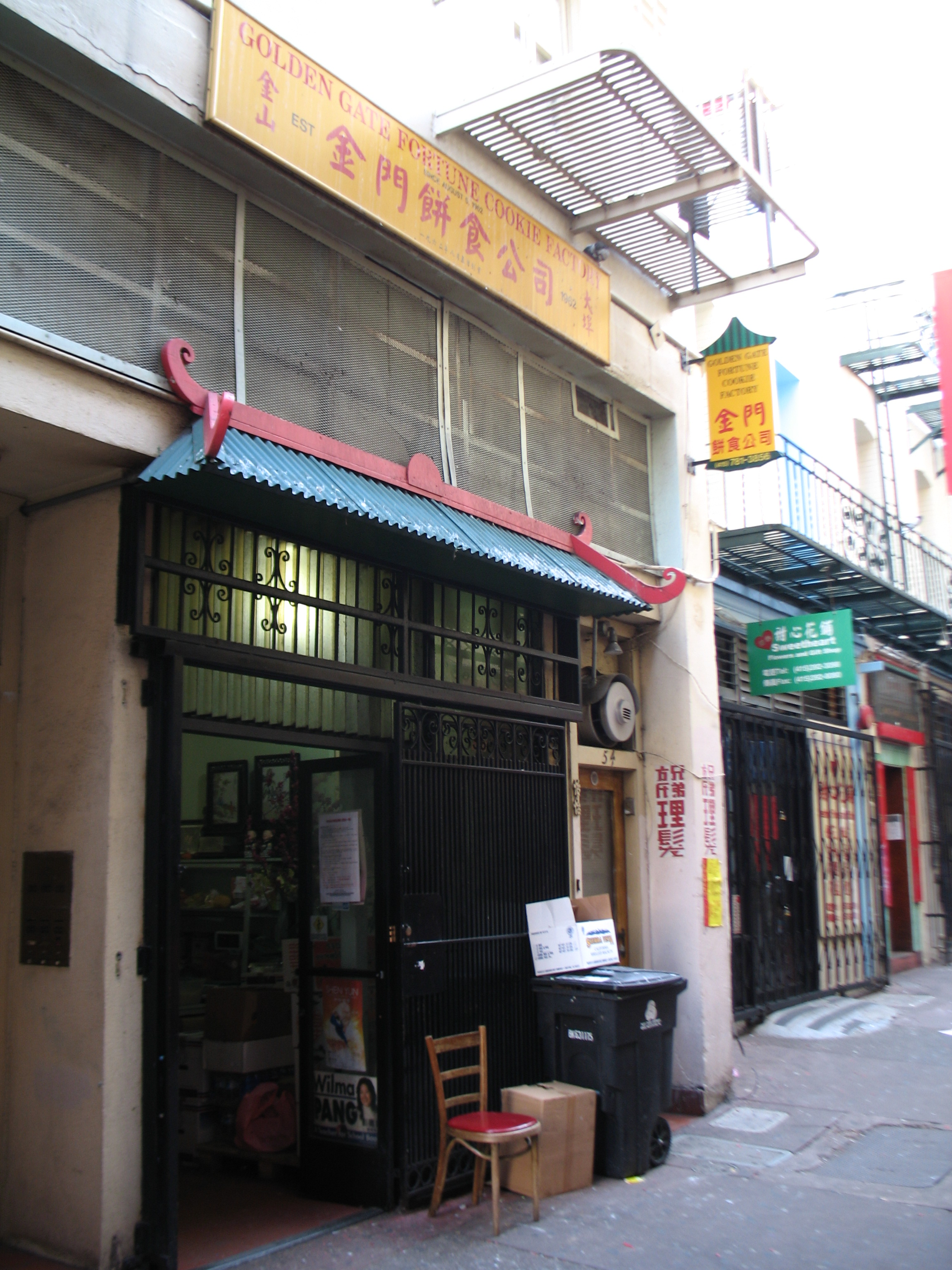
- Golden Gate Fortune Cookie Factory
- Industry: Fortune cookie
- Founded: 1962

The Golden Gate Fortune Cookie Factory (Yue Chinese: 金門餅食公, romanized: Gāmmùn béng sīkgūng) is a fortune cookie company with its main entrance off Ross Alley, between Jackson Street and Washington Street in Chinatown, San Francisco, California.

The cookie company was opened in 1962. It is owned by Franklin Yee. They make traditional fortune cookies, as well as chocolate flavored fortune cookies, almond cookies, and other sweets. Visitors can observe workers using motorized circular griddles to create fortune cookies which they sell for $17 a box, or flat cookies which they sell for $10 a bag. The company also makes "fortuneless" cookies. They charge 50 cents for photographs of the workers and the factory interior.

== Gallery ==
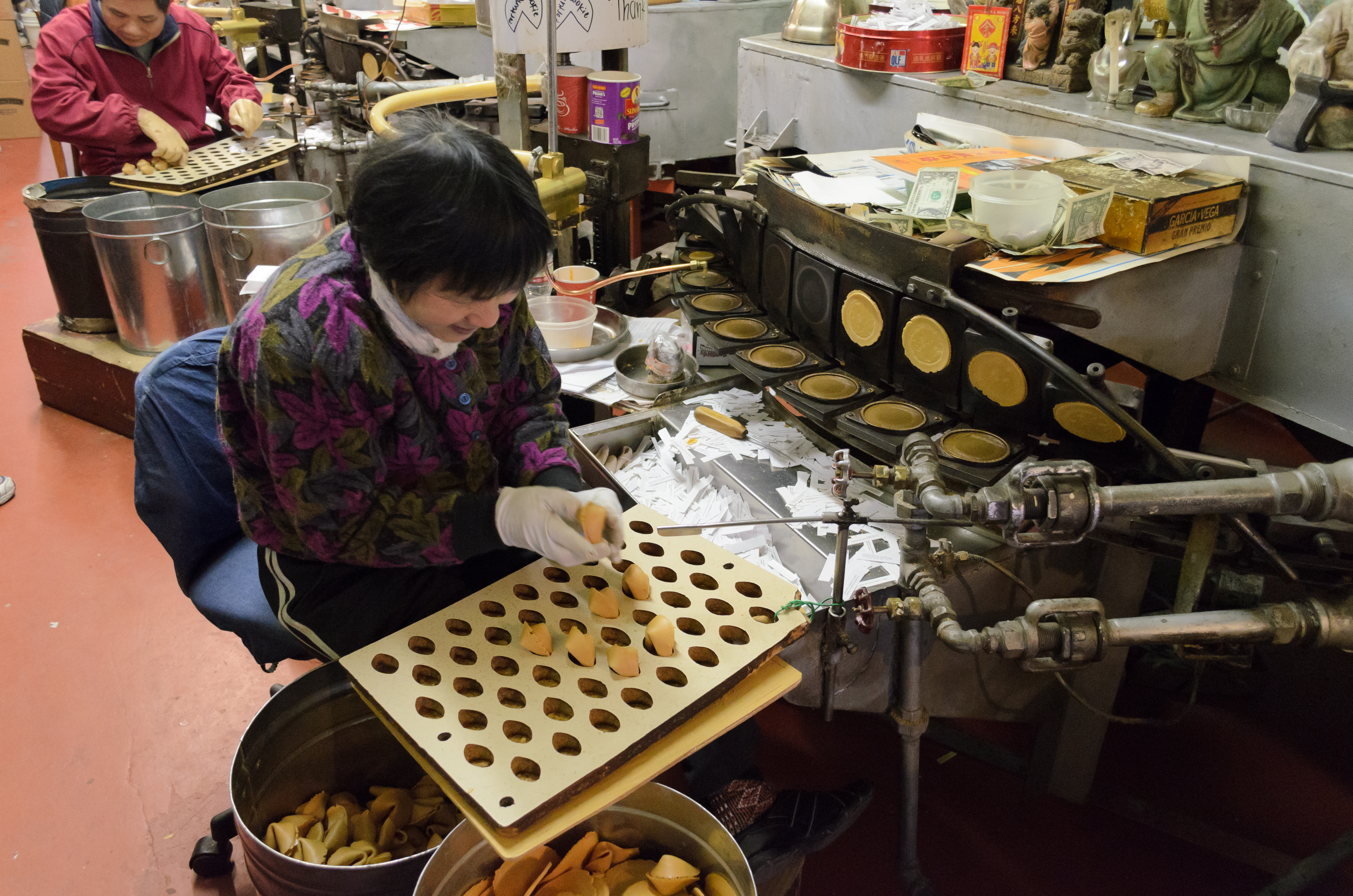

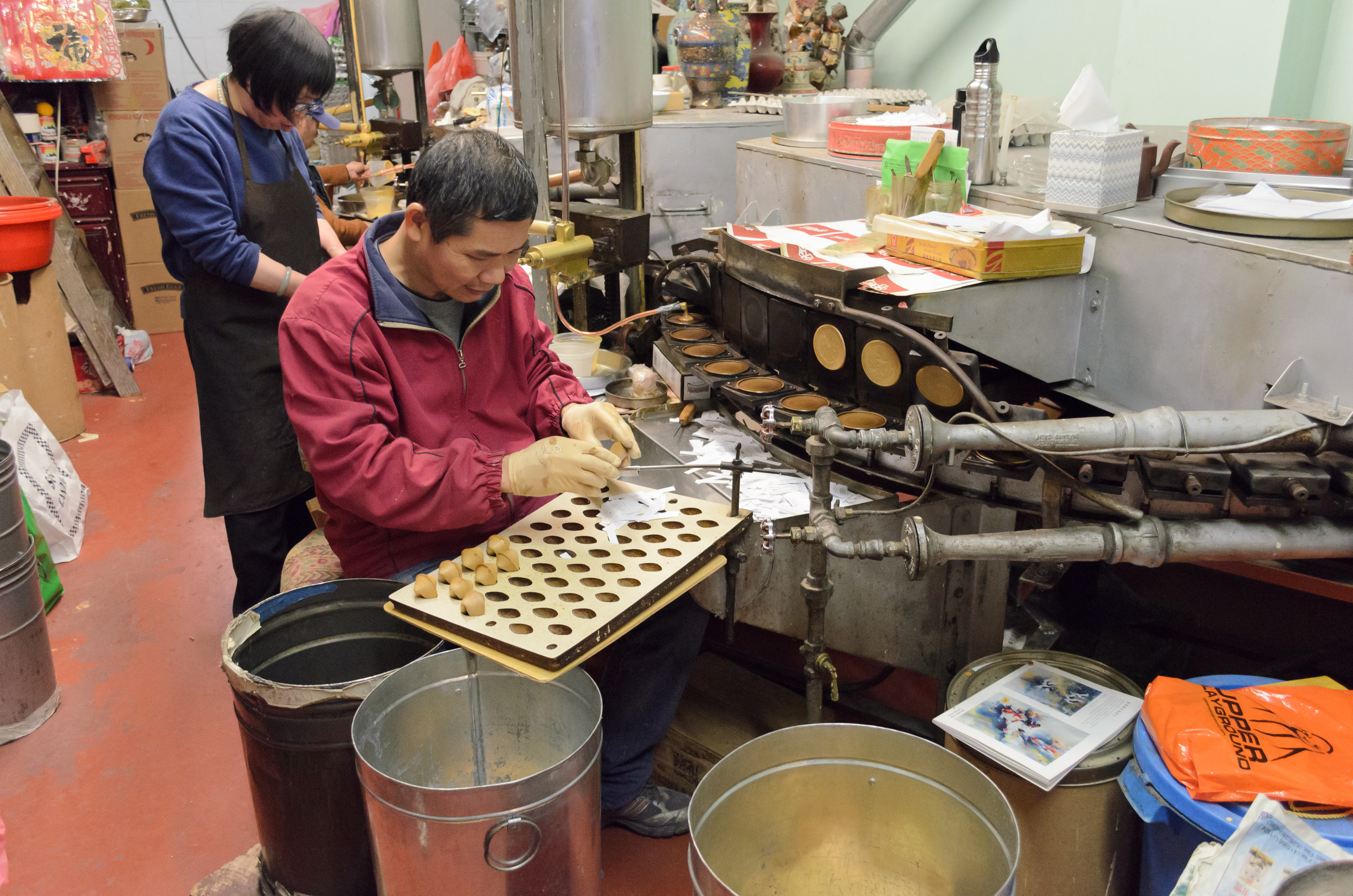
