= KHRA =

Radio station in Honolulu, Hawaii (1992–2019)

- Honolulu, Hawaii; United States
- Broadcast area: Honolulu metropolitan area
- Frequency: 1460 kHz

Ownership
- Owner: RK Media Group

History
- First air date: March 1992
- Last air date: c. 2017

Technical information
- Facility ID: 43942
- Class: B
- Power: 5,000 watts (unlimited)
- Transmitter coordinates: 21°19′26″N 157°52′32″W

KHRA (1460 AM) was a radio station located in Honolulu, Hawaii. The station was owned by RK Media Group and broadcast at 1460 kHz with power of 5,000 watts.

== History ==
Prior to its flip to Korean language programming, the 1460 AM signal was once the simulcast of KRTR-FM. KHRA at first had offered a local content before going silent in 2005.

On March 1, 2008, KHRA returned to the air and became a part of affiliated radio network RadioKorea of Los Angeles' KMPC AM 1540. The station called itself on-air RADIOKOREA HAWAII 라디오 코리아 하와이 and broadcast local news, weather, traffic and information to Korean communities in the Hawaiian islands and to Korean tourists. It also broadcast live shows from Los Angeles-based programs and locally produced shows as well, including an hour-long show on weeknights aimed at young, English speaking Hawaiian Koreans.

=== License cancellation and reinstatement ===
On June 1, 2017, the Federal Communications Commission (FCC) cancelled KHRA's license at RK Media Group's request. The FCC then reinstated the license on June 30, 2017, per request. Shortly after, KHRA filed a request to remain 'silent'. They had until June 2, 2018, to resume operations.

The FCC cancelled the station's license again on May 29, 2019, as the station apparently never resumed broadcasting and did not respond to the FCC's inquiries.
