= Commercial Street (San Francisco) =

Street in San Francisco, California, US

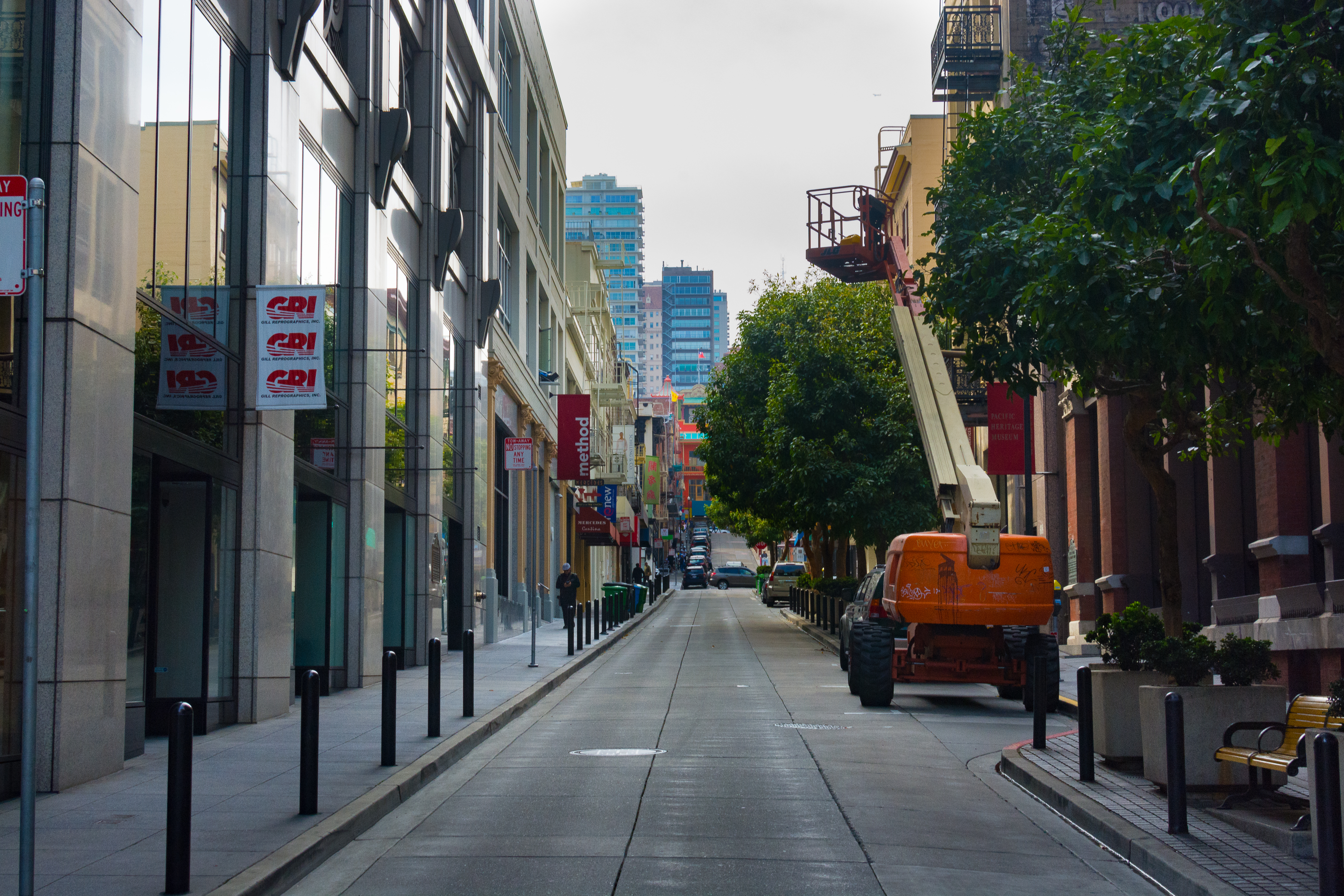
- Looking west up Commercial Street from Montgomery Street.
- Maintained by: San Francisco DPW
- Location: San Francisco
- East end: Sansome Street
- West end: Grant Avenue

Commercial Street is a street in San Francisco, California that runs from Sansome Street to Grant Avenue.

The eastern end of Commercial Street was originally the waterfront before it was filled in for real estate. It led to the Financial District and is the location of both the original San Francisco Mint and the California headquarters for the Hudson's Bay Company. After a new Mint building at Fifth and Mission Streets opened in 1874, the original Mint was demolished and replaced with a U.S. Sub-Treasury building, completed in 1877. Most of this later building was destroyed in the earthquake and fires of April 1906; but, the surviving remnant — the first-floor facade and a portion of the subterranean vaults — now helps to house the San Francisco Historical Society at 608 Commercial Street.

Commercial is one of only two streets in San Francisco oriented directly toward the tower of the Ferry Building (the other being Market Street).

Commercial Street is showcased in the 1950 film noir thriller, Woman on the Run, directed by Norman Foster. The location in particular is Sullivan's Grotto at 776 Commercial Street — the Commercial Street side entrance of Eastern Bakery at 720 Grant Avenue.

Parts of Commercial Street also contain circular designs of embedded brick taken from the street before the city paved the street. Photographer Benjamen Chinn lived on Commercial Street and played a part ensuring the street brick patterns remained so as to pay homage to its historical significance as part of Chinatown.

Commercial street sign is also seen, while blurry, in the movie 'Big Trouble In Little China'. It is near the alley that the "Lords Of Death" operate out of...in the movie.

== Honorary naming of 600 block as "Emperor Norton Place" ==
Between 1864/65 and his death in January 1880, the San Francisco eccentric and folk hero known as Emperor Norton is documented to have lived in the Eureka Lodgings, a rooming house located at 624 Commercial Street, between Montgomery and Kearny Streets. The building that housed the Eureka was destroyed in the disaster of April 1906. The Eureka site now is occupied by a 4-story apartment building at 650/652 Commercial.

In February 2023, San Francisco Board of Supervisors president Aaron Peskin introduced a resolution to add "Emperor Norton Place" as a commemorative name for the 600 block of Commercial Street. The resolution was adopted by the Supervisors and approved by Mayor London Breed in April 2023, with signage installed in early May.
