= Grant Avenue =

Street in San Francisco, California, US

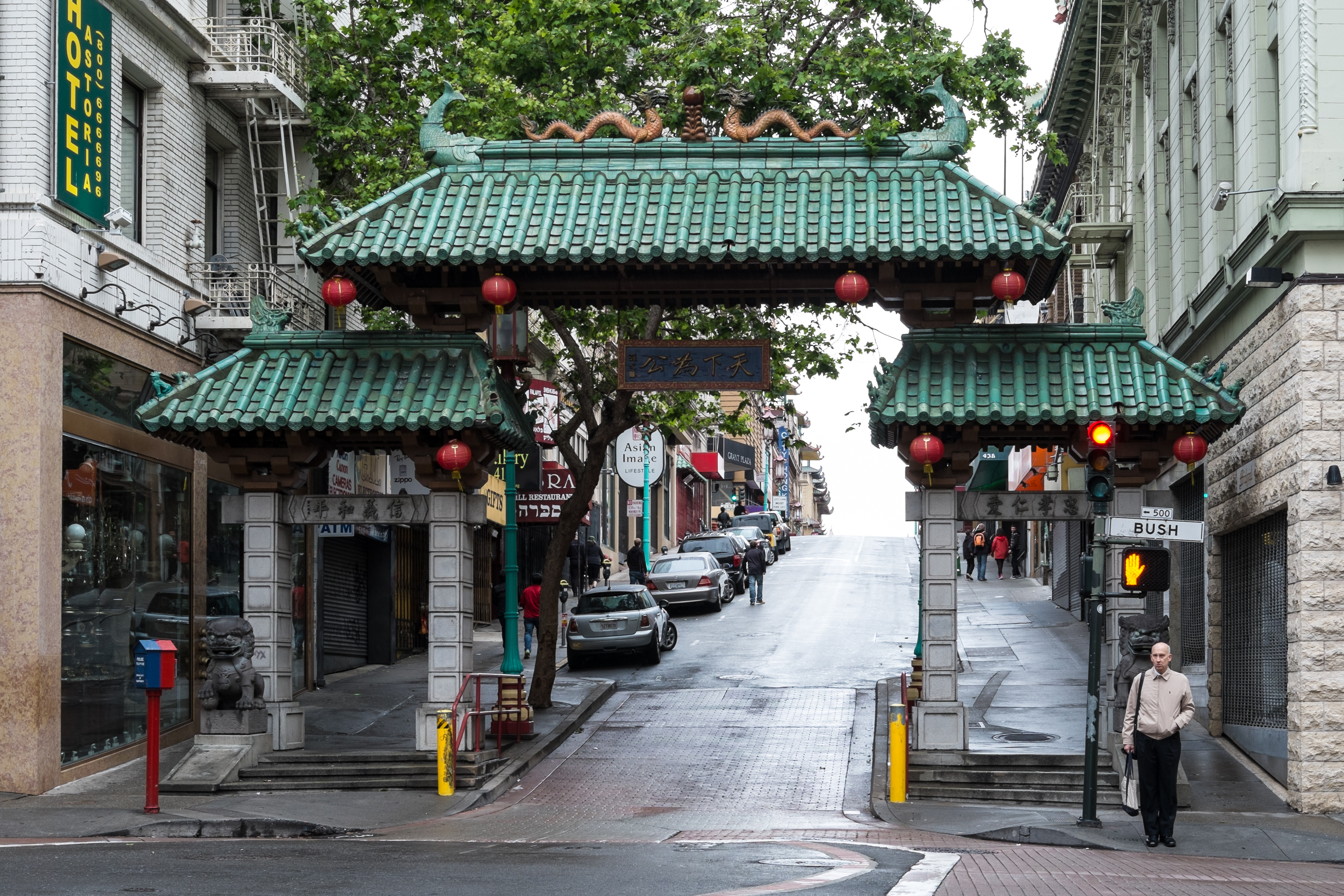
- Grant Avenue at Bush Street: The Dragon Gate at the entrance to Chinatown
- Former name(s): Calle de la Fundación, Dupont Street (1847)
- Namesake: Ulysses S. Grant
- Location: San Francisco, California
- Postal code: 94108
- Coordinates: 37°47′51″N 122°24′25″W
- South end: O'Farrell Street
- Major junctions: Jackson Street in Chinatown
- North end: The Embarcadero

Construction
- Inauguration: 1845

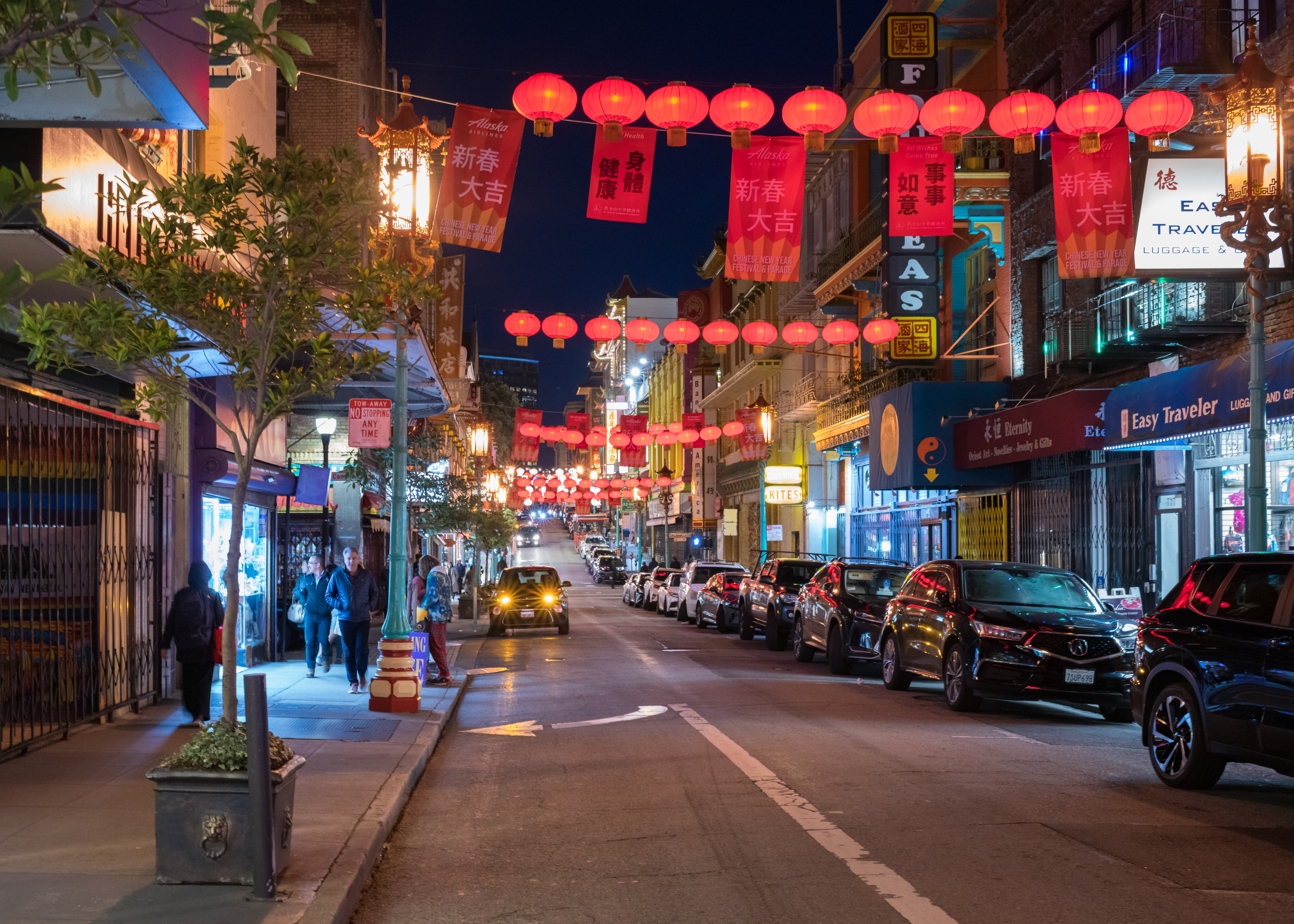
Grant Avenue at night

Grant Avenue in San Francisco, California, is one of the oldest streets in the city's Chinatown district. It runs in a north–south direction starting at Market Street in the heart of downtown and dead-ending past Francisco Street in the North Beach district. It resumes at North Point Street and stretches one block to The Embarcadero and the foot of Pier 39.

Grant Avenue is primarily a one-way street; automobile traffic can travel only northbound. In 2012, however, the two blocks of Grant Avenue between Sutter and Geary streets were converted to two-way traffic in order to ease southbound traffic congestion during the multi-year closure of Stockton Street, part of the construction plan for the Central Subway.

== History ==
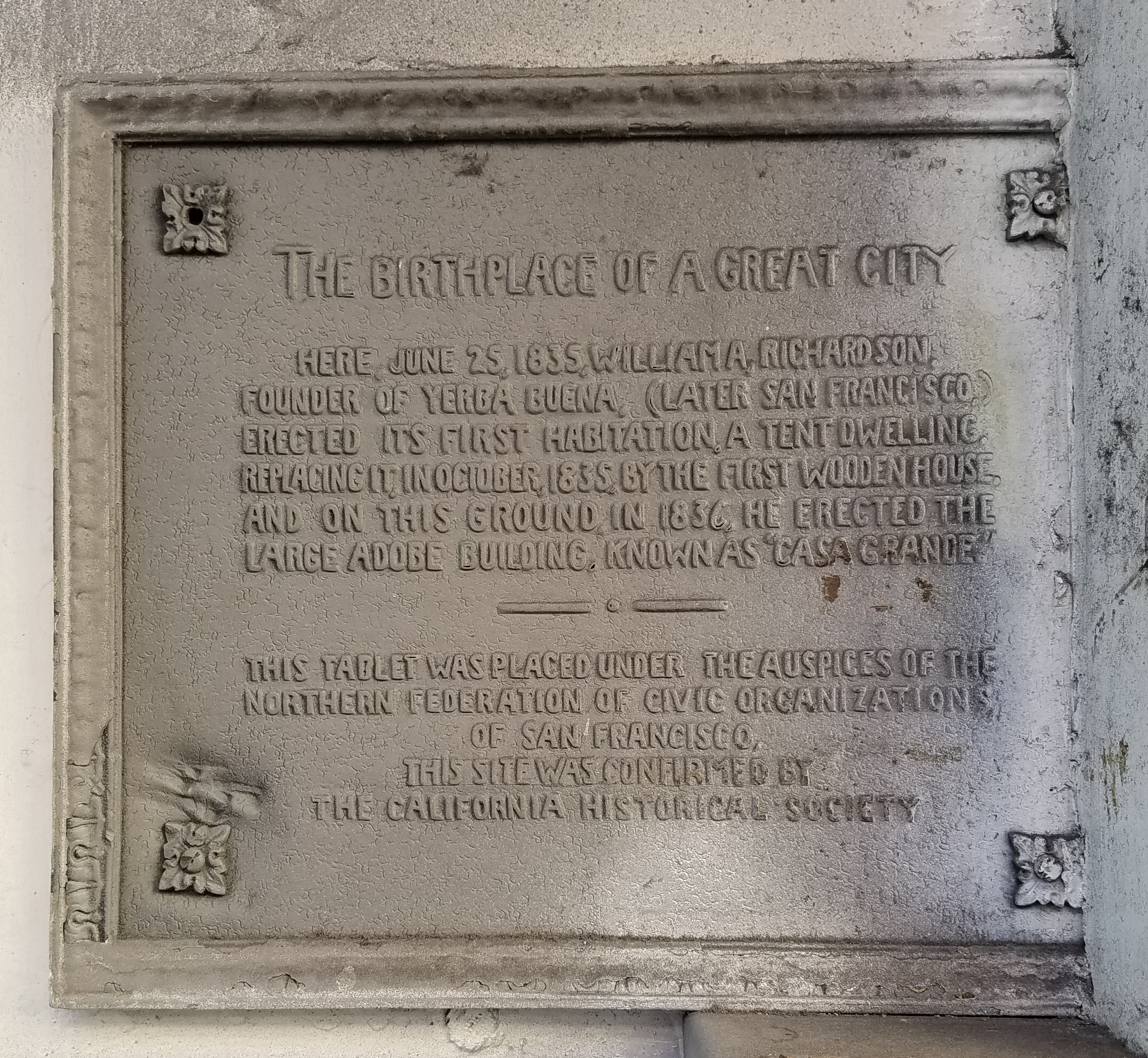
"Birthplace of a great city" plaque at 823 Grant Avenue

In 1835, the very first housing structure of Yerba Buena (the later San Francisco) was erected by William A. Richardson at what today is Grant Avenue, between Clay and Washington streets.

When California came under the control of the United States following the Mexican–American War of 1846–1848, the street now called Grant was named Dupont Street, in honor of a Naval admiral from the USS Portsmouth (Portsmouth Square, located one block east, was named after that ship). In the following years, Dupont Street became the location for many Chinese stores, along with some opium dens, brothels, and Tong wars.

When San Francisco was rebuilt after being leveled in the 1906 earthquake, Dupont Street was upgraded and given a new name: Grant Avenue, after President Ulysses S. Grant.

Today, the intersection of Grant Avenue and Bush Street marks the southern entrance to Chinatown. Grant Avenue is still written and said in Chinese as "Du Pon Gai" (都板街, Gai 街 means street).

== In popular culture ==
Grant Avenue plays an important role in Rodgers and Hammerstein's Broadway musical Flower Drum Song as well as the movie version of the musical. One of the musical numbers is entitled "Grant Avenue." The original name of the musical, before it was changed, was "Grant Avenue."
