= Ying On Association =

Chinese-American fraternal organization

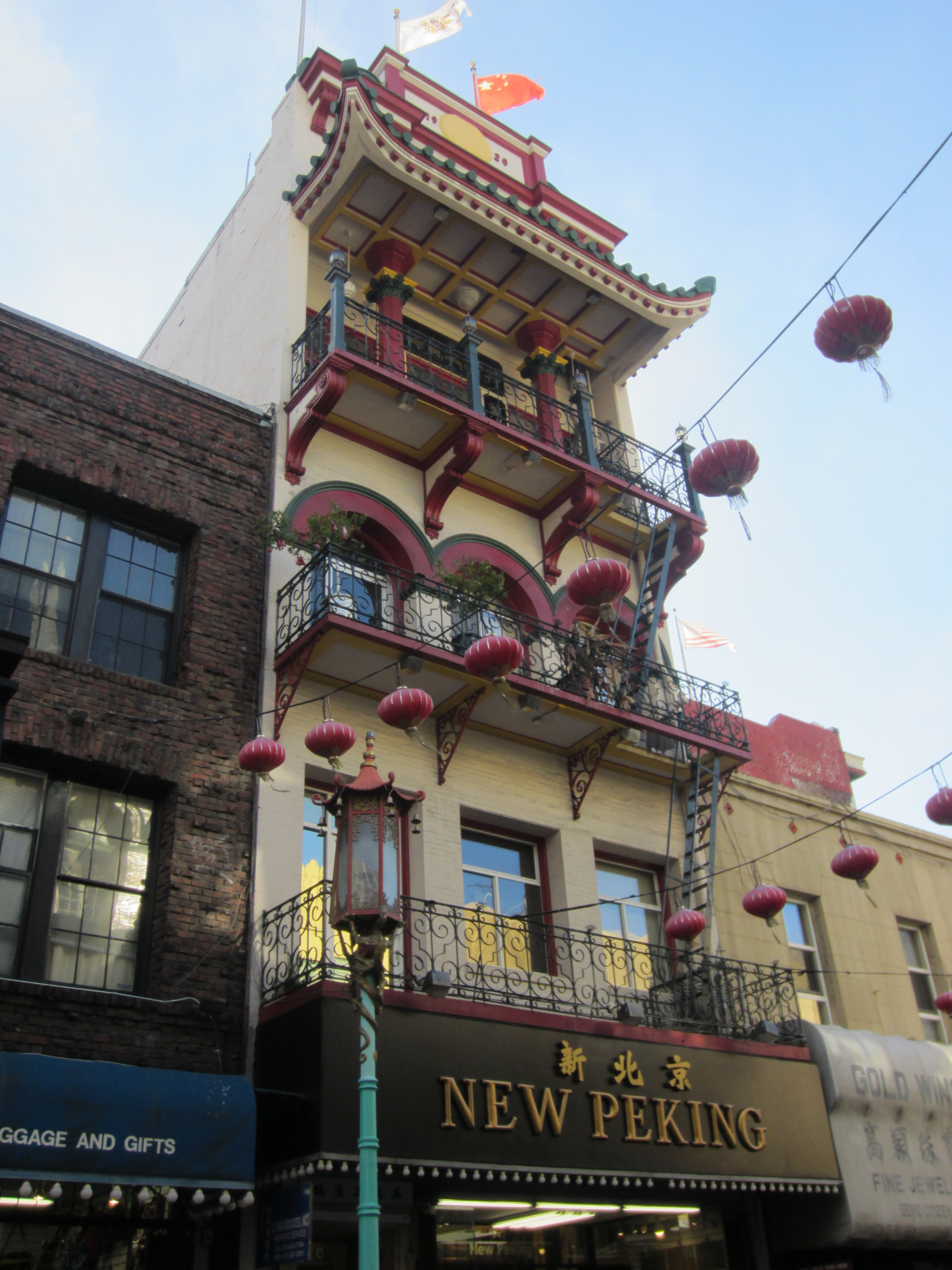
The Ying On Association building in Chinatown, San Francisco at 745–747 Grant Avenue. The prominent first-floor retailer is "New Peking".

The Ying On Labor & Merchant Association (Chinese: 英端工商會) or simply Ying On Association is a historical Chinese American association that was established in the 1930s for the purpose of assisting members of the Chinese community when they were threatened by unfair and discriminatory business practices; for organizing social gathering places for the Chinese; and at times, for organizing funeral parlors for the dead who had no kin or family in America. It also served as a boarding house for single Chinese men upon arrival to Tucson, Arizona and a fraternal organization for elderly Chinese men.

The Ying On Association still exists today.

== Branches ==
The Ying On Association has several branches in the United States including in:

- Bakersfield, California - 2110 L Street Google Street View
- Fresno, California - 1147 F Street Google Street View
- Las Vegas, Nevada - 5595 Spring Mountain Road Google Street View
- Los Angeles, California - 426 Bernard Street Google Street View
- Oakland, California - 712 Webster Street Google Street View
- Phoenix, Arizona - 2232 N 16th Street Google Street View
- San Diego, California - 502 3rd Avenue Google Street View
- San Francisco, California - 745 Grant Avenue Google Street View
- Tucson, Arizona - 1935 S 6th Avenue Google Street View
