= Chinatown, San Francisco (disambiguation) =

Chinatown, San Francisco, known as the "original" Chinatown, is a neighborhood on Grant Avenue/Stockton Street.

Chinatown, San Francisco may also refer to:

- Clement Street Chinatown, San Francisco, in the Richmond District
- Irving Street Chinatown, San Francisco, in the Sunset District
- Noriega Street Chinatown, San Francisco, in the Sunset District
