= Chinatown, San Francisco =

Neighborhood in California, United States

Chinatown
- Neighborhood
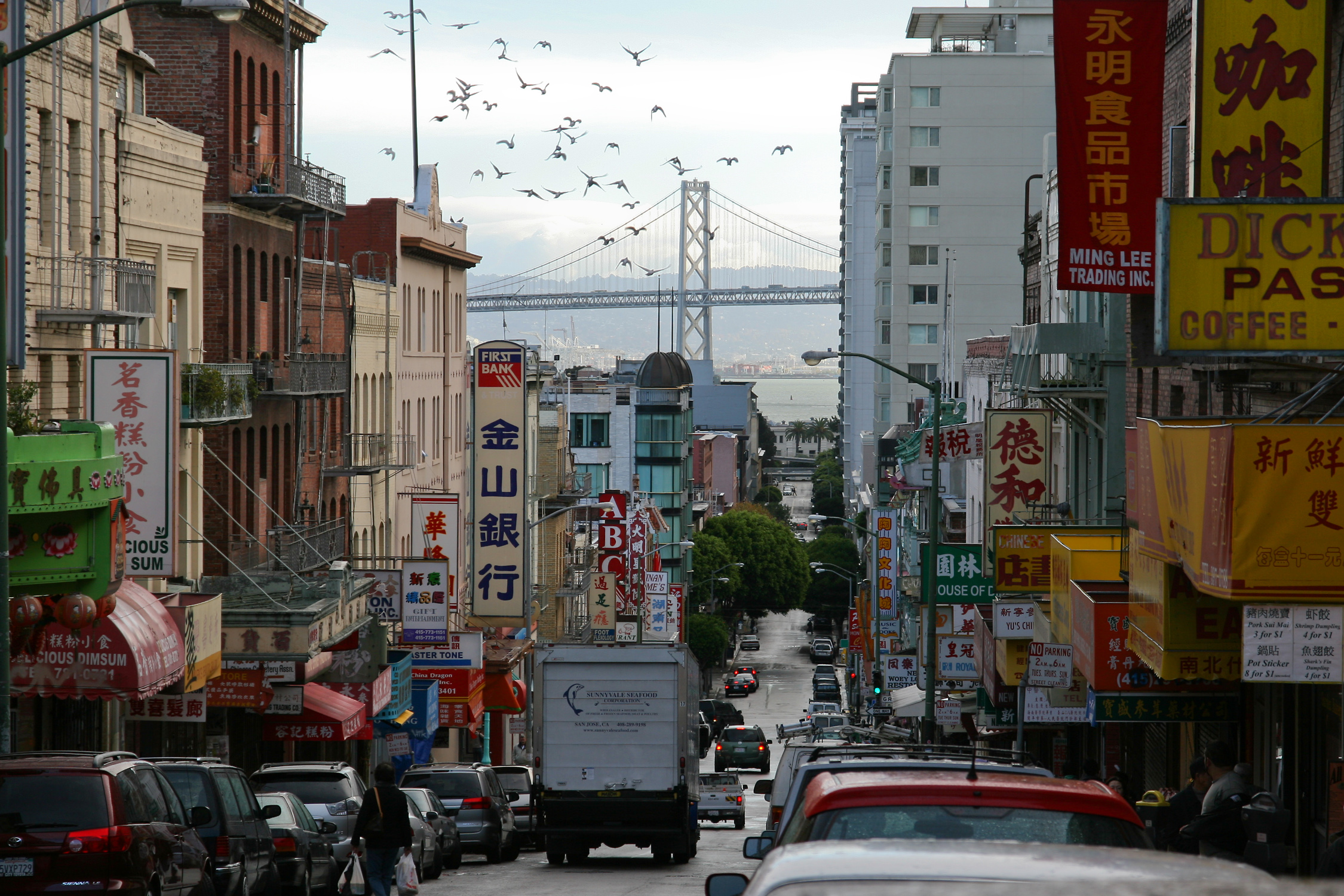
- Chinatown businesses line Jackson Street, with the Bay Bridge in the background.

- Location within Central San Francisco
- Coordinates: 37°47′39″N 122°24′25″W
- Country: United States
- State: California
- City-county: San Francisco

Government
  - Supervisor: Danny Sauter
  - Assemblymember: Matt Haney (D)
  - State senator: Scott Wiener (D)
  - U. S. rep.: Nancy Pelosi (D)

Population (2000)
  - Total: 34,891
  - Estimate (2013): 34,557
- Time zone: UTC−8 (Pacific)
  - Summer (DST): UTC−7 (PDT)
- ZIP Codes: 94102, 94109, 94108, 94111, 94133
- Area Codes: 415/628

Chinatown, San Francisco
- Chinese: 唐人街
Transcriptions
Standard Mandarin
- Hanyu Pinyin: Tángrénjiē
Hakka
- Romanization: Tongˇ nginˇ gieˊ
Yue: Cantonese
- Jyutping: Tong4 jan4 gaai1

The Chinatown, (Note: Chinese: 唐人街; pinyin: Tángrénjiē; Jyutping: Tong4 jan4 gaai1; Yale romanization: Tòhng yàhn gāai; Peng'im: Deng5 rêng5 goi1; Pha̍k-fa-sṳ: Thòng-ngìn-kiê/kiâi) centered on Grant Avenue and Stockton Street in San Francisco, California, is the oldest Chinatown in North America and is one of the largest Chinese enclaves outside Asia. It is also the oldest and largest of the four notable Chinese enclaves within San Francisco. Since its establishment in the early 1850s, it has been important and influential in the history and culture of ethnic Chinese immigrants in North America. Chinatown is an enclave that has retained its own customs, languages, places of worship, social clubs, and identity. San Francisco's Chinatown is also a major tourist attraction, drawing more visitors annually than the Golden Gate Bridge (as of 2013).

The Chinatown district is primarily Cantonese and Taishanese-speaking, both dialects originating in southern China. Most Chinatown residents have origins in Guangdong Province and Hong Kong, with some Mandarin-speaking residents from Taiwan and central and Northern China, although lesser in comparison to Cantonese-speaking people, despite Cantonese being a minority language amongst people in China and ethnically Chinese people in Asia.

There are two hospitals, several parks and squares, numerous churches, a post office, and other infrastructure. Recent immigrants, many of whom are elderly, opt to live in Chinatown because of the availability of affordable housing and their familiarity with the culture.

== Geography and location ==
Selected locations in Chinatown, San Francisco
- Points of interest
- Parks and open spaces
- Hospital
1 Dragon Gate
2 Saint Mary's Square
3 Sing Chong and Sing Fat buildings
4 Nam Kue School
5 Portsmouth Square
6 Chinese Telephone Exchange
7 Tin How Temple
8 Ross Alley / Fortune Cookie factory
9 Chinese Hospital
10 Chinese Historical Society of America
11 Six Companies

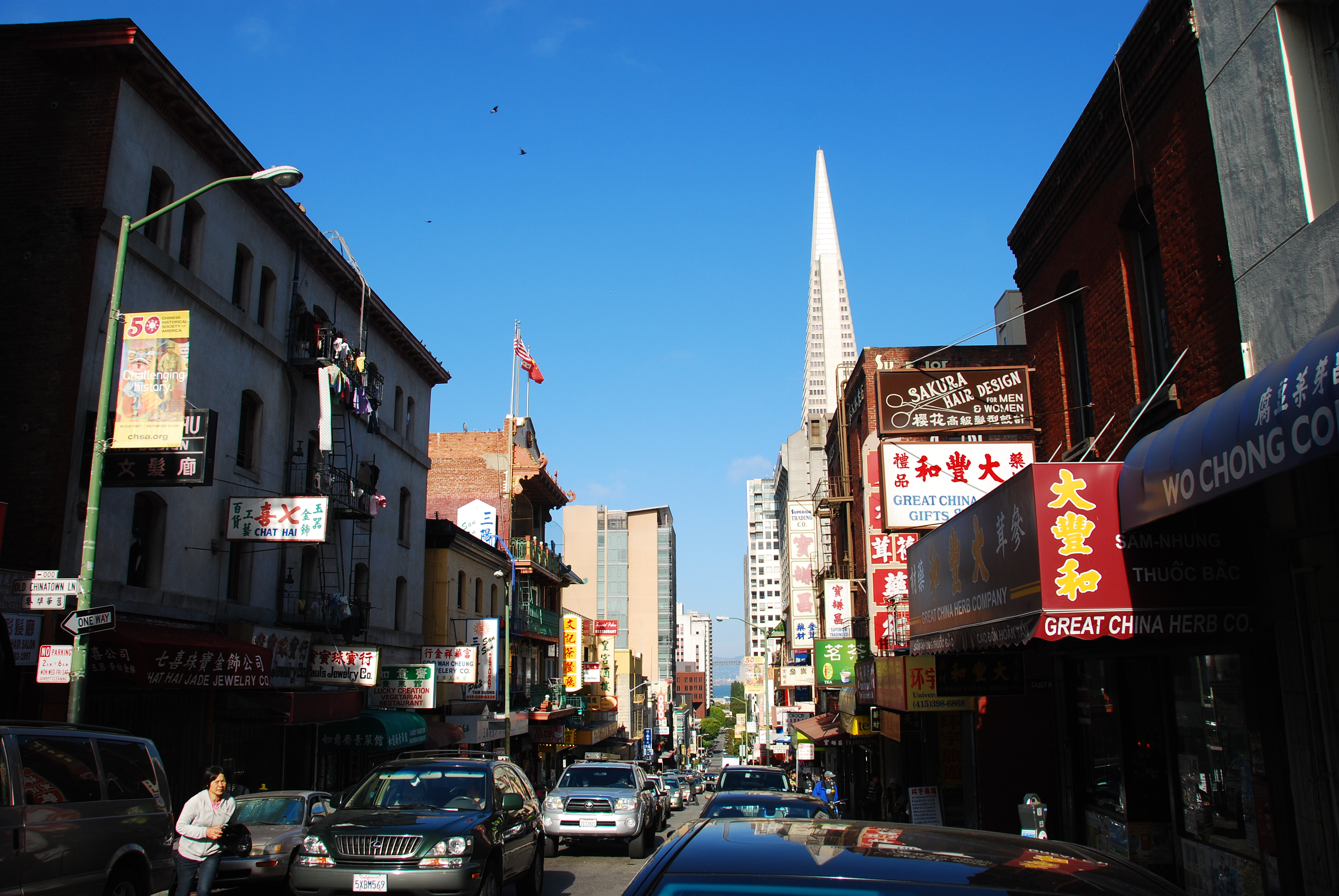
Washington Street in Chinatown with Transamerica Pyramid in the background.

Officially, Chinatown is located in downtown San Francisco, covers 24 square blocks, and overlaps five postal ZIP Codes (94108, 94133, 94111, 94102, and 94109). It is within an area of roughly 1/2 mi (0.80 km) long (north to south) by 1/4 mi (0.40 km) wide (east to west) with the current boundaries being, approximately, Kearny Street in the east, Broadway in the north, Powell in the west, and Bush Street in the south.

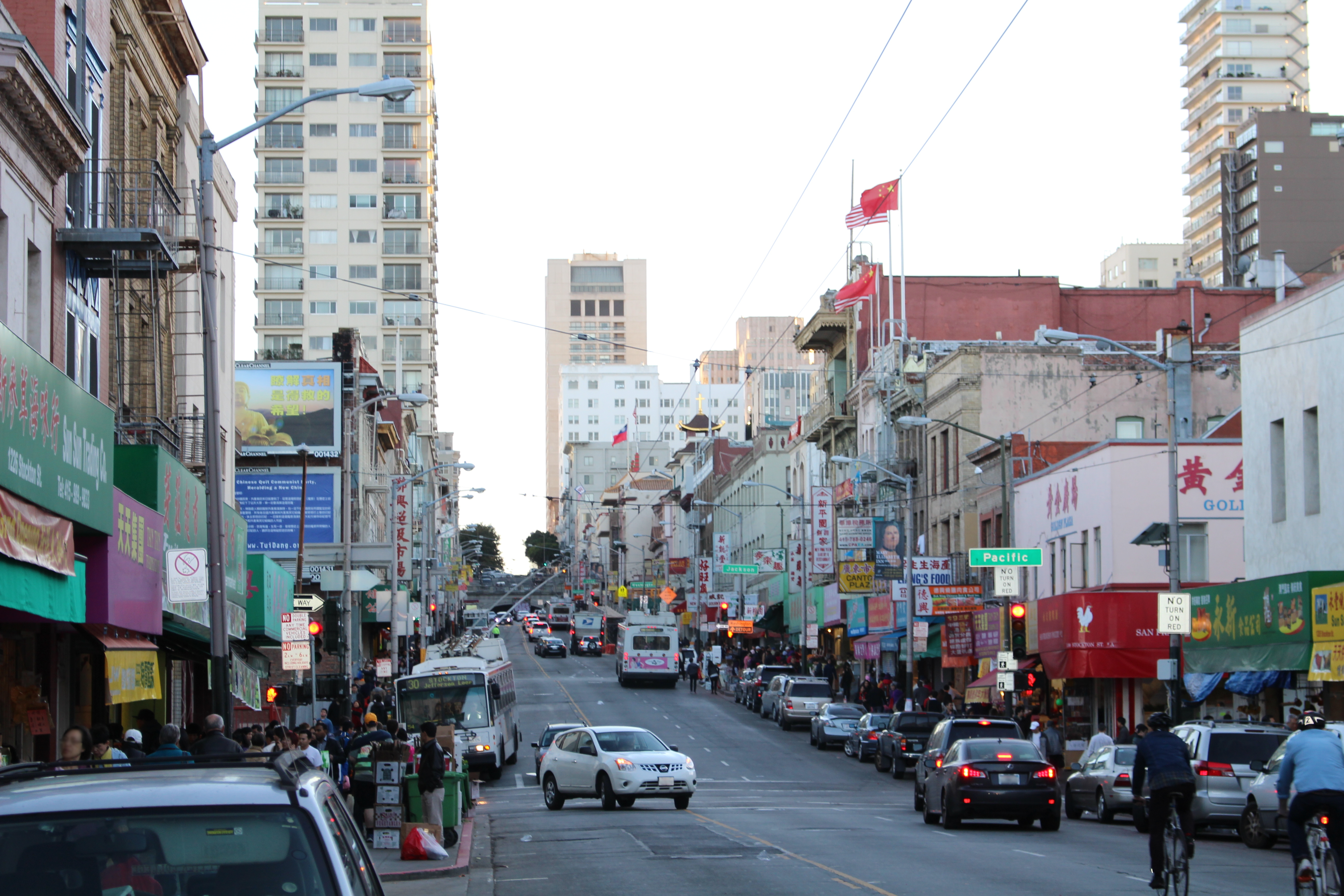
Stockton Street

Within Chinatown there are two major north–south thoroughfares. One is Grant Avenue, with the Dragon Gate ("Chinatown Gate" on some maps) at the intersection of Bush Street and Grant Avenue, designed by landscape architects Melvin Lee and Joseph Yee and architect Clayton Lee; Saint Mary's Square with a statue of Sun Yat-sen by Benjamin Bufano; a war memorial to Chinese war veterans; and stores, restaurants and mini-malls that cater mainly to tourists. The other, Stockton Street, is frequented less often by tourists, and it presents an authentic Chinese look and feel reminiscent of Hong Kong, with its produce and fish markets, stores, and restaurants. It is dominated by mixed-use buildings that are three to four stories high, with shops on the ground floor and residential apartments upstairs.

A major focal point in Chinatown is Portsmouth Square. Since it is one of the few open spaces in Chinatown and sits above a large underground parking lot, Portsmouth Square is used by people such as tai chi practitioners and old men playing Chinese chess. A replica of the Goddess of Democracy used in the Tiananmen Square protest was built in 1999 by Thomas Marsh and stands in the square. It is made of bronze and weighs approximately 600 lb (270 kg).

== Demographics ==
According to the San Francisco Planning Department, Chinatown is "the most densely populated urban area west of Manhattan", with 15,000 residents living in 20 square blocks. In the 1970s, the population density in Chinatown was seven times the San Francisco average.

During the time from 2009 to 2013, the median household income was $20,000 – compared to $76,000 citywide – with 29% of residents below the national poverty threshold. The median age was 50 years, the oldest of any neighborhood. As of 2015, two thirds of the residents lived in one of Chinatown's 105 single room occupancy hotels (SRO), 96 of which had private owners and nine were owned by nonprofits. There are two public housing projects in Chinatown, Ping Yuen and North Ping Yuen.

Most residents are monolingual speakers of mutually unintelligible varieties of the Chinese language: historically Hoisanese, now Cantonese and some Mandarin. In 2015, only 14% of households in the SROs were headed by a person that spoke English fluently. The areas of Stockton and Washington Streets and Jackson and Kearny Streets in Chinatown are almost entirely Chinese or Asian, with blocks ranging from 93% to 100% Asian. According to a study by the San Francisco Planning Department in 2018, 81% of the residents in the neighborhood were Asian.

Many of the Chinese immigrants who managed to accumulate wealth while living in Chinatown move to the Richmond District, the Sunset District, or the suburbs.

=== Demographic history ===
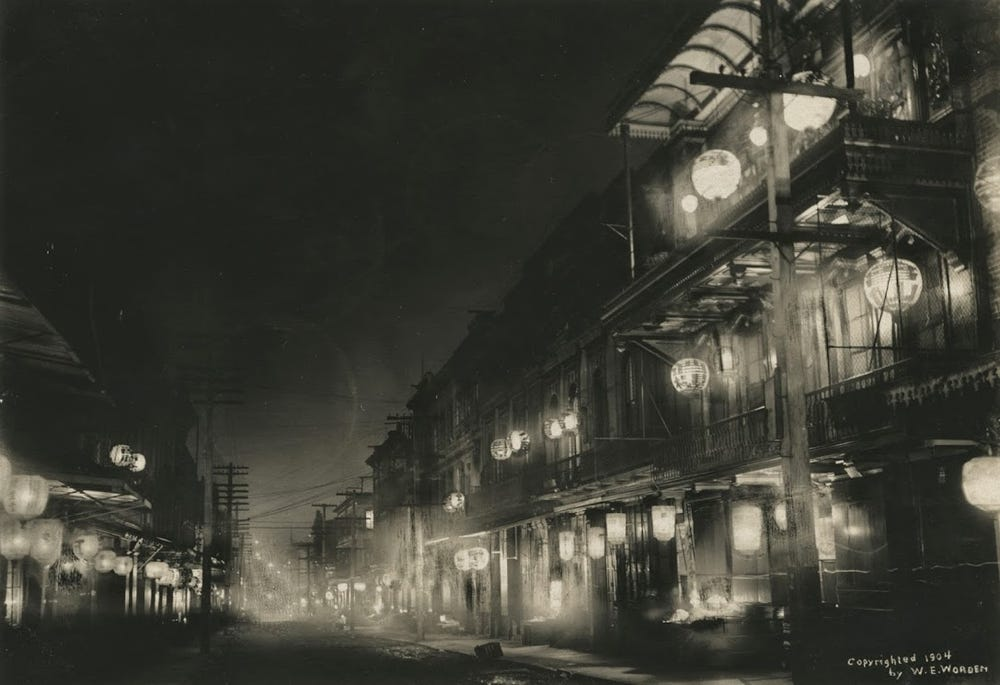
Willard Worden, Midnight in Chinatown, gelatin silver print, 1903.

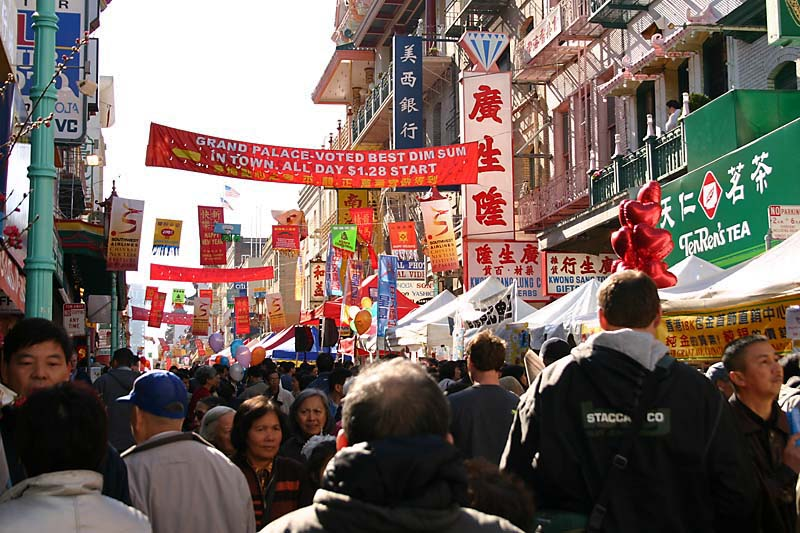
Grant Avenue during Chinese New Year.

In the 1850s, Chinese pioneers, mainly from villages in the Pearl River Delta in Guangdong, began immigrating in large numbers to San Francisco, initially drawn by the California Gold Rush and the building of the first transcontinental railroad, and settling in Chinatown for refuge from the hostilities in the West. The main dialect spoken in Chinatown then was Hoisan-wa (aka Hoisanese; Toisanese in Cantonese and Taishanese in Mandarin), native to the emigrants from Hoisan (aka Toisan in Cantonese and Taishan in Mandarin), Sze Yup, in the Pearl River Delta. Surviving the ravages of the 1880s, Chinatown became a haven for later waves of emigrants from China in the 20th century.

Working-class Hongkonger emigrants began arriving in large numbers in the late 1960s. Despite their status and professional qualifications in Hong Kong, many took low-paying employment in restaurants and garment factories in Chinatown because of limited English. An increase in Cantonese-speaking emigrants from Hong Kong and Mainland China has gradually led to the replacement in Chinatown of the Hoisanese dialect by the standard Cantonese dialect.

Due to such overcrowding and poverty, other Chinese areas have been established within the city of San Francisco proper, including one in its Richmond and three more in its Sunset districts, as well as a recently established one in the Visitacion Valley neighborhood. These outer neighborhoods have been settled largely by Chinese from Southeast Asia. There are also many suburban Chinese communities in the San Francisco Bay Area, especially in Silicon Valley, such as Cupertino, Fremont, and Milpitas, where many Mandarin-speaking Taiwanese Americans settled. Despite these developments, many continue to commute in from these outer neighborhoods and cities to shop in Chinatown, causing gridlock on roads and delays in public transit, especially on weekends. To address this problem, the local public transit agency, Muni extended the city's subway network to the neighborhood via the new Central Subway.

Unlike in most Chinatowns in the United States, ethnic Chinese refugees from Vietnam have not established businesses in San Francisco's Chinatown district, due to high property values and rents. Instead, many Chinese-Vietnamese – as opposed to ethnic Vietnamese who tended to congregate in larger numbers in San Jose – have established a separate Vietnamese enclave on Larkin Street in the heavily working-class Tenderloin district of San Francisco, where it is now known as the city's "Little Saigon".

== History ==
=== Origins: 1850s ===
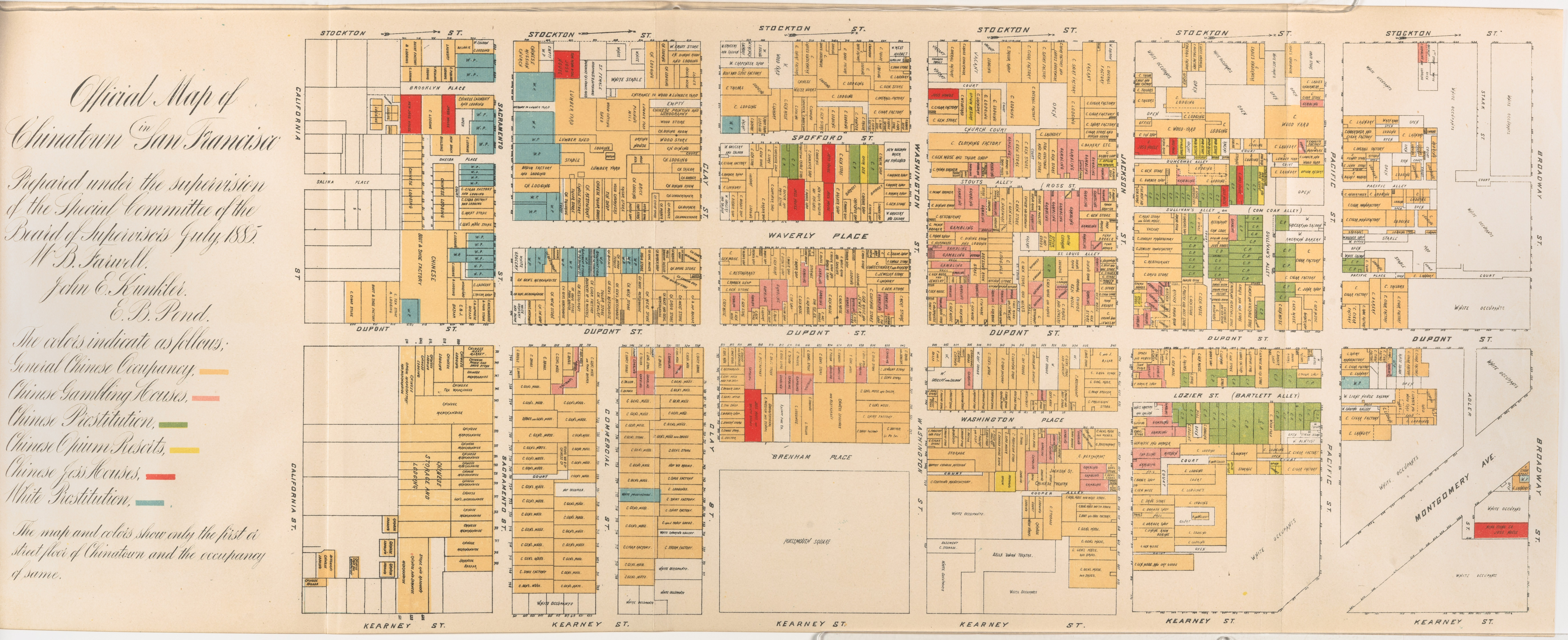
Official Map of Chinatown (July 1885). Map is oriented with north to the right side. Dupont (now Grant) is the prominent street running north–south along the middle of the map. Full extent of map is Stockton (top/west), Kearny (bottom/east), California (left/south), and Broadway (right/north). Special attention is paid to vices: prostitution is marked in green (Chinese) and blue (white); joss houses are marked in red; opium dens are marked in bright yellow; and gambling is marked in pink.

==== Guangdong pioneers ====
San Francisco's Chinatown was the port of entry for early Chinese immigrants from the west side of the Pearl River Delta, speaking mainly Hoisanese and Zhongshanese, in the Guangdong province of southern China from the 1850s to the 1900s. On August 28, 1850, at Portsmouth Square, San Francisco's first mayor, John Geary, officially welcomed 300 "China Boys" to San Francisco. By 1854, the Alta California, a local newspaper which had previously taken a supportive stance on Chinese immigrants in San Francisco, began attacking them, writing after a recent influx that "if the city continues to fill up with these people, it will be ere long become necessary to make them subject of special legislation".

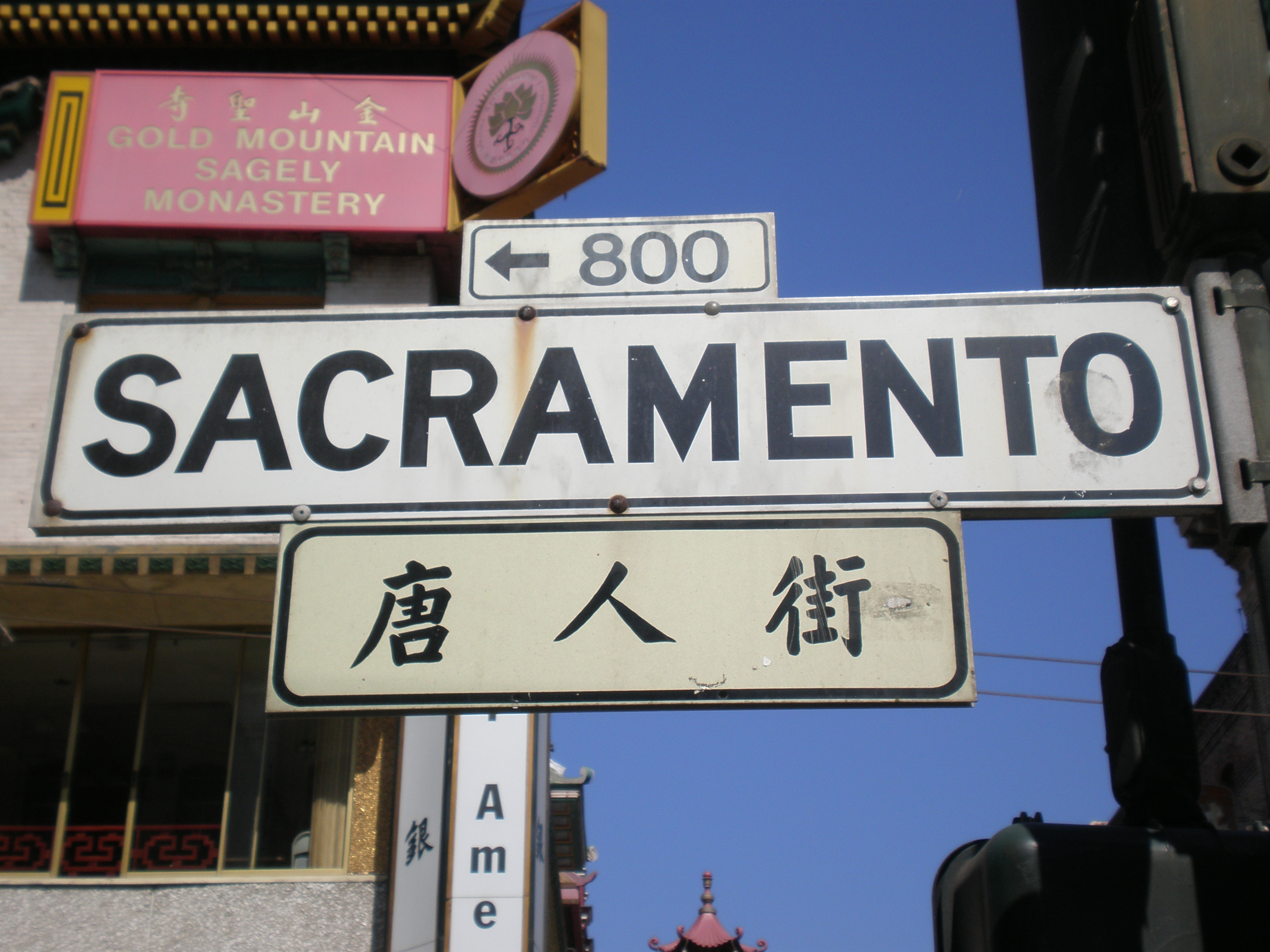
Sacramento St.; 唐人街: literally "Tang people street"

These early immigrants settled near Portsmouth Square and around Dupont Street (now called Grant Ave). As the settlement grew in the early 1850s, Chinese shops opened on Sacramento St, which the Guangdong pioneers called "Tang people street" (唐人街); and the settlement became known as "Tang people town" (唐人埠), which in Cantonese is Tong Yun Fow. By the 1870s, the economic center of Chinatown moved from Sacramento St to Dupont St; e.g., in 1878, out of 423 Chinese firms in Chinatown, 121 were located on Dupont St, 60 on Sacramento St, 60 on Jackson St, and the remainder elsewhere.

The area was the one geographical region deeded by the city government and private property owners which allowed Chinese persons to inherit and inhabit dwellings within the city. The majority of these Chinese shopkeepers, restaurant owners, and hired workers in San Francisco Chinatown were predominantly Hoisanese and male. For example, in 1851, the reported Chinese population in California was about 12,000 men and fewer than ten women. Some of the early immigrants worked as mine workers or independent prospectors hoping to strike it rich during the 1849 Gold Rush. Many Chinese found jobs working for large companies seeking a source of labor, most famously as part of the Central Pacific on the Transcontinental Railroad, from 1865 to 1869.

==== Associations and institutions ====
The west side of the Pearl River Delta of Guangdong, where most of the Chinese emigrated from, was subdivided into many distinct districts and some with distinct dialects. Several district associations in San Francisco, open to anyone emigrating from those districts in Guangdong, were formed in the 1850s to act as a culture-shock absorber for newly arrived immigrants and to settle disputes among their members. Although there are some disagreements about which association formed first, by 1854, six such district associations were formed, of various size and influence, and disputes between members of different associations became more frequent. Thus, in 1862, the six district associations (commonly called the Chinese Six Companies, even though the number of member associations varied through the years) banded together to resolve inter-district disputes. This was made formal in 1882 and incorporated in 1901 as the Chinese Consolidated Benevolent Association (on Stockton Street) to look after the general interest of the Chinese people living in a hostile western world.

Founded purportedly in roughly 1852 or 1853, the Tin How Temple (Queen of Heaven and Goddess of the Seven Seas) on Waverly Place is the oldest Chinese temple in the United States. It is dedicated to the goddess Tin How or Mazu, the Divine Protector of seafarers, much honored by Chinese immigrants, especially arriving by ship, to San Francisco. The original building was destroyed in the 1906 earthquake, and it opened on the top floor of a four-story building at 125 Waverly Place in 1910.

After closing in 1955, the temple reopened in 1975, due to a resurgence of interest from a new immigrant population following the Immigration and Nationality Act of 1965. Another Mazu temple, known as Ma-Tsu Temple was established in 1986 by Taiwanese American community and affiliated to Chaotian Temple in Taiwan.

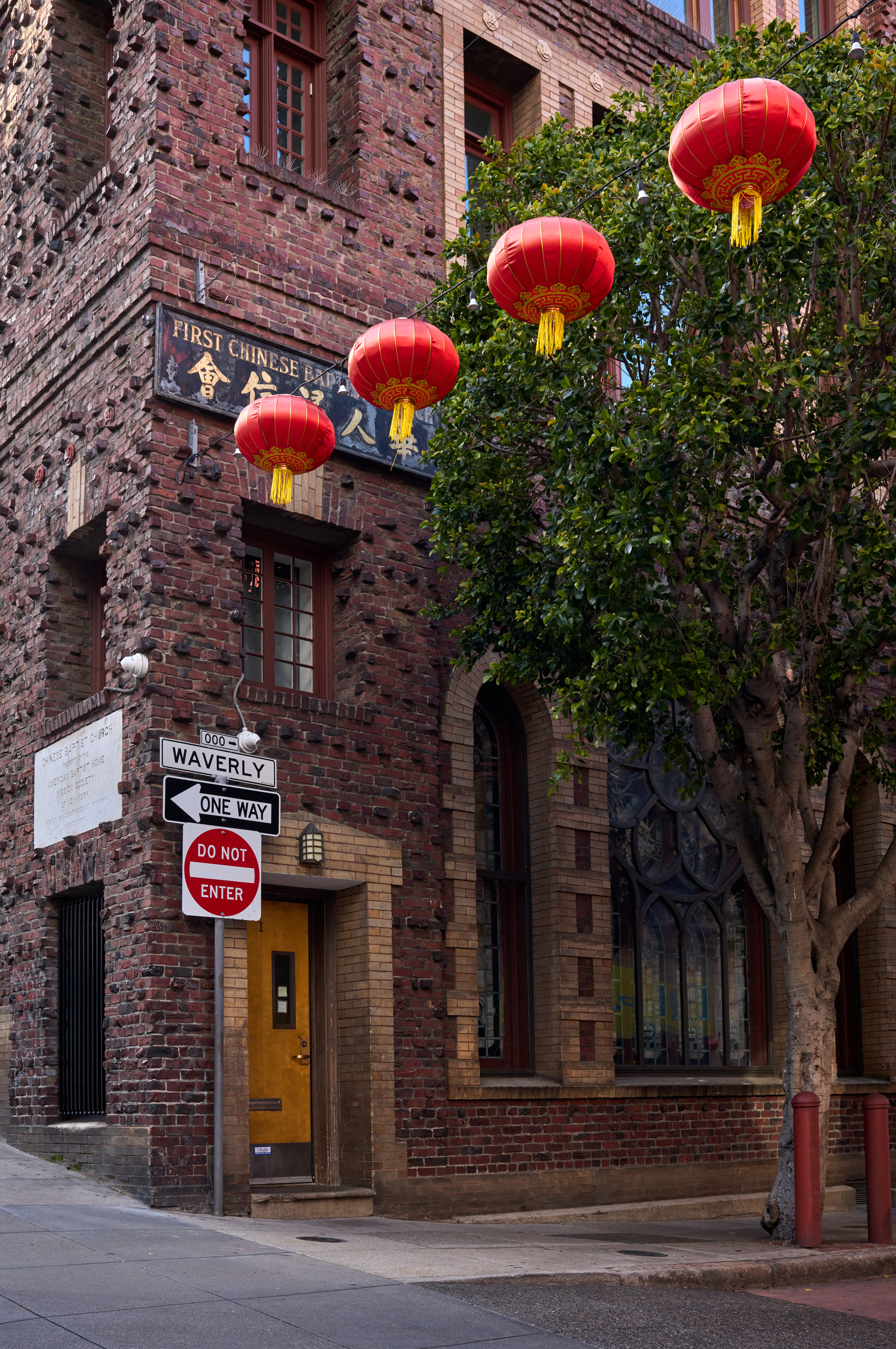
First Chinese Baptist Church on the corner of Waverly and Sacramento Street

The Chinese Presbyterian Church on Stockton Street can trace its roots to October 1852, when Cantonese-speaking Rev. William Speer, a missionary in Canton, came to work with the Chinese immigrants in San Francisco. In November 1853 he organized the first Chinese mission in the United States, which provided much needed medical aid and conducted day and night schools that taught English to Chinese immigrants. He also published a Chinese/English newspaper, the Oriental, which staunchly defended the Chinese as anti-Chinese sentiment began to grow in the 1850s. The original building was destroyed by the earthquake, and the present church building on 925 Stockton Street was built in 1907.

Other Christian denominations followed, including the Methodist Church on Washington Street (founded 1870, rebuilt 1911) and the First Baptist Church (founded 1880, rebuilt 1908 on Waverly Place) as well as Catholic, Congregational, and Episcopal. The pattern these early missions followed was to first conduct English language classes and Sunday schools. In these decades, the only English classes available to Chinese immigrants were those offered by these Christian missions. Some added rescue homes (e.g., from prostitution), and social services for the sick and protection from racial discrimination. With such tactics, the early Christian missions and churches in Chinatown gained widespread respect and new converts.

==== Prostitution and ill repute ====
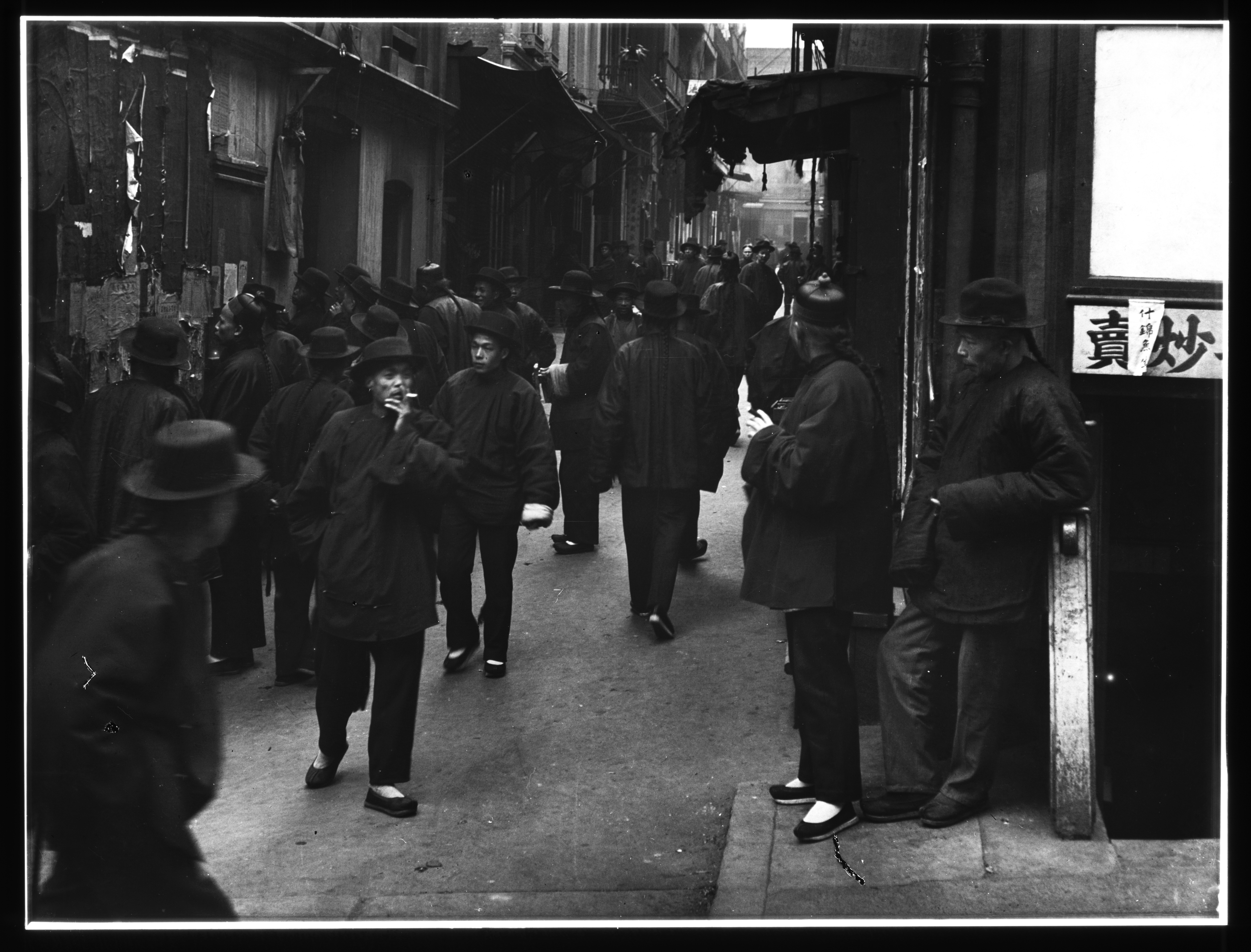
The Street of the Gamblers (Ross Alley), Arnold Genthe, 1898. The population of Chinatown was predominantly male because U.S. policies at the time made it difficult for Chinese women to enter the country.

In the 1850s, San Francisco "was all but submerged in Caucasian forms of gambling and prostitution and lewdness". During the late period of the California Gold Rush, a few Chinese female prostitutes began their sexual businesses in Chinatown. In addition, the major prostitution enterprises had been raised by criminal gang group "Tong", importing unmarried Chinese women to San Francisco. During the 1870s to 1880s, the population of Chinese sex workers in Chinatown grew rapidly to more than 1,800, accounting for 70% of the total Chinese female population.

In the mid-19th century, police harassment reshaped the urban geography and the social life of Chinese prostitutes. Consequently, hundreds of Chinese prostitutes were expelled to side streets and alleys hidden from public traffic. From 1870 to 1874, the California legislature formally criminalized the immigrant Asian women who were transported into California. In 1875, the U.S. Congress followed California's action and passed the Page Law, which was the first major legal restriction to prohibit the immigration of Chinese, Japanese, and Mongolian women into America. In 1882, the Chinese Exclusion Act declared that no more skilled or unskilled immigrants would be allowed to enter the country, which meant that many Chinese and Chinese Americans could not have families in America, because their wives and children were prohibited to immigrate. Simultaneously, the public discourse began to accuse Chinese prostitutes of transmitting venereal diseases. Dr. Hugh Huger Toland, a member of the San Francisco Board of Health, reported that white boys and men contracted diseases when they visited "Chinese houses of prostitution" in Chinatown, in order to warn white citizens to stay away; Toland asserted that nine-tenths of his patients had patronized Chinese prostitutes. "When these persons come to me I ask them where they got the disease, and they generally tell me that they have been with Chinawomen."

All great cities have their slums and localities where filth, disease, crime and misery abound; but in the very best aspect which "Chinatown" can be made to present, it must stand apart, conspicuous and beyond them all in the extreme degree of all these horrible attributes, the rankest outgrowth of human degradation that can be found upon this continent. Here it may truly be said that human beings exist under conditions (as regards their mode of life and the air they breathe) scarcely one degree above those under which the rats of our water-front and other vermin live, breathe and have their being. And this order of things seems inseparable from the very nature of the race, and probably must be accepted and borne with—must be endured, if it cannot be cured—restricted and looked after, so far as possible, with unceasing vigilance, so that, whatever of benefit, "of degree," even, that may be derived from such modification of the evil of their presence among us, may at least be attained, not daring to hope that there can be any radical remedy for the great, overshadowing evil which Chinese immigration has inflicted upon this people.

— The Report of the Special Committee of the Board of Supervisors of San Francisco, on the Condition of the Chinese Quarter of that City (1885)

==== Emergence of tourism ====
By the end of the 19th century, Chinatown's assumed reputation as a place of vice caused it to become a tourist destination, attracting numerous working-class white people, who sought the oriental mystery of Chinese culture and sought to fulfill their expectations and fantasies about the filth and depravity. The white customers' patronization of Chinatown prostitutes was more extensive than gambling. After catering for three decades to white people as well as Chinese bachelors, Chinatown's prostitution sector developed into a powerful vested interest, favoring the vice industry. As the tourist industry grew up, the visitors came to include members of the white middle class, which pushed the vice businesses to transform into an entertainment industry as a more respectable form in which to serve white customers.

After the completion of the transcontinental railroad in 1869, San Francisco saw the birth of its tourism industry. By the 1870s and further established in the 1880s and 1890s, Chinatown's exotic, infamous reputation began to attract tourists. Tour providers emphasized the vice-ridden elements of the area, strongly encouraging any curious visitors to take a professional guide or police escort with them to venture into Chinatown. These early tours often included staged reenactments of the "depravity of the locals" who were paid by tour operators to participate in the reenactments. Such reenactments exacerbated the perceptions of Chinatown as a problematic, vice-ridden location among San Francisco visitors and San Franciscans. The emphasis on the danger and depravity of the community ignored deeper issues of poverty, racial discrimination, and problems of overcrowding with overtaxed infrastructure.

==== Ah Toy ====
Ah Toy (18 May 1829 – 1 February 1928) was a Cantonese prostitute and madam in San Francisco during the California Gold Rush, and purportedly the first Chinese prostitute in San Francisco. Arriving from Hong Kong in 1848, she became the best-known Asian woman in the American frontier. When Ah Toy left China for the United States, she originally traveled with her husband, who died during the voyage. Toy became the mistress of the ship's captain, who showered gold upon her, so much so that by the time she arrived in San Francisco in the 1840s, Toy had a fair bit of money. Noticing the looks she drew from the men in her new town, she figured they would pay for a closer look. Her peep shows became quite successful, and she eventually became a high-priced prostitute. In 1850, Toy opened a chain of brothels at 34 and 36 Waverly Place (then called Pike Street), importing girls from China in their teens, 20s and 30s, as well as some as young as eleven years old, to work in them. Her neighbors on Pike Street—conveniently linked to San Francisco's business district by Commercial Street—included the elegant new "parlour house" of madame Belle Cora, and the cottage of Fanny Perrier, mistress of Judge Edward (Ned) McGowan. In 1857, Ah Toy returned to China a wealthy woman to live the rest of her days in comfort, but came back to California in 1859. From 1868 until her death in 1928, she lived a largely quiet life in Santa Clara County, returning to public attention only upon dying at age 98 in San Jose, three months short of her ninety ninth birthday. Cinemax series Warrior depicted Ah Toy one of main characters of the series.

=== 1870s–1906 earthquake ===
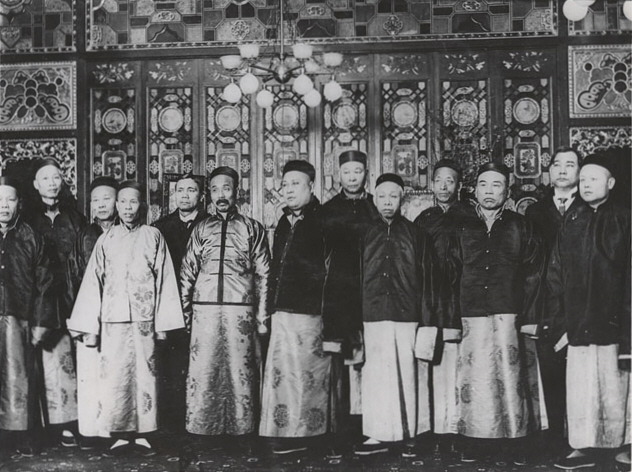
Officers of the Chinese Six Companies

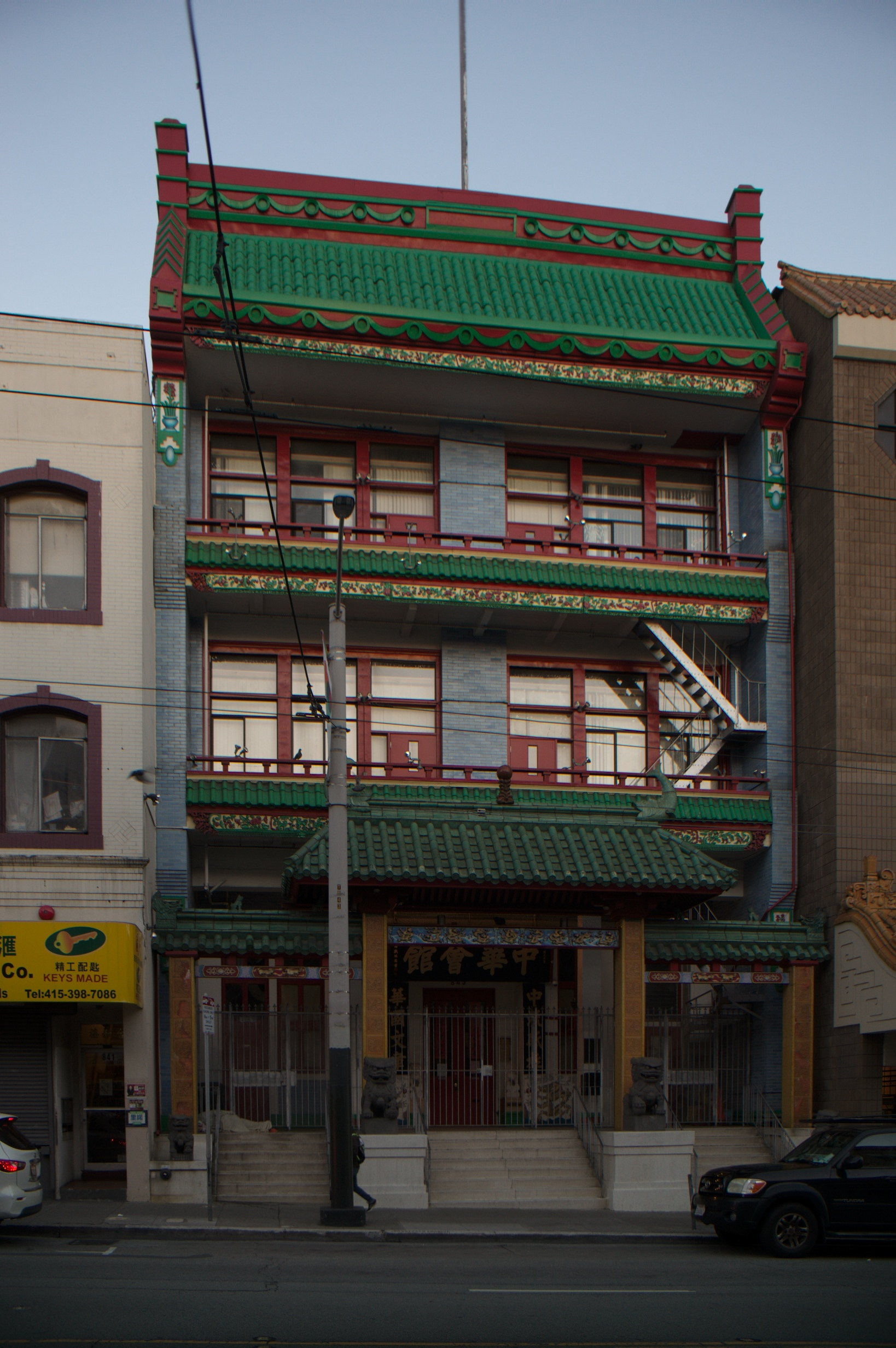
The headquarters of the Chinese Six Companies on Stockton

Relations between the United States and Qing China were normalized through the Burlingame Treaty of 1868. Among other terms, the treaty promised the right of free immigration and travel within the United States for Chinese. Business leaders saw China as a plentiful source of cheap labor, and celebrated the treaty's ratification. But this did not last for long.

The mostly male Chinese immigrants came to the United States with the intent of sending money home to support their families; coupled with the high cost of repaying their loans for travel, they often had to take any work that was available. Fears began to arise among non-Chinese workers that they could be replaced, and resentment towards Chinese immigrants rose. With extensive nationwide unemployment in the wake of the Panic of 1873, racial tensions in the city boiled over into full blown race riots. The two-day San Francisco riot of 1877 raged through Chinatown in July; four were killed and US$100,000 (equivalent to $3,020,000 in 2025) in property damage was done to Chinese-owned businesses. In response to the violence, the Chinese Consolidated Benevolent Association, also known as the Chinese Six Companies, which evolved out of the labor recruiting organizations for different areas of Guangdong, was created to provide the community with a unified voice. The heads of these companies advocated for the Chinese community to the wider business community as a whole and to the city government.

The state legislature of California passed several measures to restrict the rights of Chinese immigrants, but these were largely superseded by the terms of the Burlingame Treaty of 1868.

==== Chinese Exclusion Act ====
In 1880, the Burlingame Treaty was renegotiated and the United States ratified the Angell Treaty, which allowed federal restrictions on Chinese immigration and temporarily suspended the immigration of unskilled laborers. Anti-immigrant sentiment became federal law once the United States Government passed the Chinese Exclusion Act of 1882: the first immigration restriction law aimed at a single ethnic group. This law, along with other immigration restriction laws such as the Geary Act, greatly reduced the numbers of Chinese allowed into the country and the city, and in theory limited Chinese immigration to single males only. Exceptions were in fact granted to the wives and minor children of wealthy merchants; immigrants would purchase or partner in businesses to declare themselves merchants in order to bring their families to America. Alternatively, prospective immigrants could become "paper sons" by purchasing the identity of Americans whose citizenship had been established by birthright. However, the Exclusion Act was credited with reducing the population of the neighborhood to an all-time low in the 1920s.

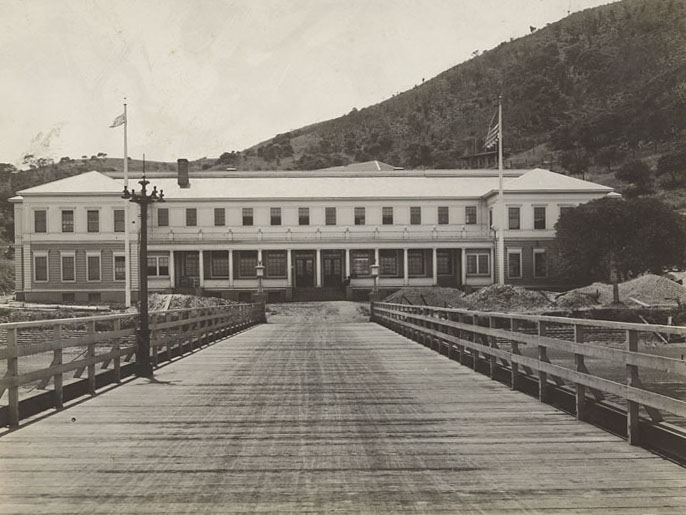
Main immigration building on Angel Island

Many early Chinese immigrants to San Francisco and beyond were processed at Angel Island, in the San Francisco Bay, which is now a state park. Unlike Ellis Island on the east coast where prospective European immigrants might be held for up to a week, Angel Island typically detained Chinese immigrants for months while they were interrogated closely to validate their papers. The detention facility was renovated in 2005 and 2006 under a federal grant.

==== Tong wars ====
As in much of San Francisco, a period of criminality existed during the late 19th century; many tongs arose, trafficking in smuggling, gambling, and prostitution. From the mid-1870s, turf battles sprang up over competing criminal enterprises. By the early 1880s, the term tong war was being popularly used to describe these periods of violence in Chinatown. At their height in the 1880s and 1890s, twenty to thirty tongs ran highly profitable gambling houses, brothels, opium dens, and slave trade enterprises in Chinatown. Overcrowding, segregation, graft, and the lack of governmental control contributed to conditions that sustained the criminal tongs until the early 1920s.

Members of the San Francisco Police Chinatown Squad, 1905

Chinatown's isolation and compact geography intensified the criminal behavior that terrorized the community for decades despite efforts by the Six Companies and police/city officials to stem the tide. The San Francisco Police Department established its so-called Chinatown Squad in the 1880s, consisting of six patrolmen led by a sergeant. However, the Squad was ineffective largely by design. An investigation published in 1901 by the California state legislature found that Mayor James D. Phelan and Police Chief William P. Sullivan Jr. had knowingly tolerated gambling and prostitution in Chinatown in the interest of bolstering municipal revenue, calling the police department "so apathetic in putting down the horrible system of slavery existing in Chinatown as to justify your committee in believing it criminally negligent." Phelan and Sullivan testified it would take between 180 and 400 policemen to enforce the laws against gambling and prostitution, which was contradicted by the ex-Chief of Police William J. Biggy, who said 30 "earnestly directed" policemen would suffice.

==== Bubonic plague ====
Chinatown, as it is at present, cannot be rendered sanitary except by total obliteration. It should be depopulated, its buildings leveled by fire and its tunnels and cellars laid bare. Its occupants should be colonized on some distant portion of the peninsula, where every building should be constructed under strict municipal regulation and where every violation of the sanitary laws could be at once detected. The day has passed when a progressive city like San Francisco should feel compelled to tolerate in its midst a foreign community, perpetuated in filth, for the curiosity of tourists, the cupidity of lawyers and the adoration of artists.

— Dr. Williamson, Annual Report to the Board of Health (quoted in 1901)

In March 1900, a Chinese-born man who was a long-time resident of Chinatown was found dead of bubonic plague. The next morning, all of Chinatown was quarantined, with policemen preventing "Asiatics" (people of Asian heritage) from either entering or leaving. The San Francisco Board of Health began looking for more cases of plague and began burning personal property and sanitizing buildings, streets and sewers within Chinatown. Chinese Americans protested and the Chinese Consolidated Benevolent Association threatened lawsuits.

The quarantine was lifted but the burning and fumigating continued. A federal court ruled that public health officials could not close off Chinatown without any proof that Chinese Americans were anymore susceptible to plague than Anglo Americans.

=== 1906 to the 1960s ===
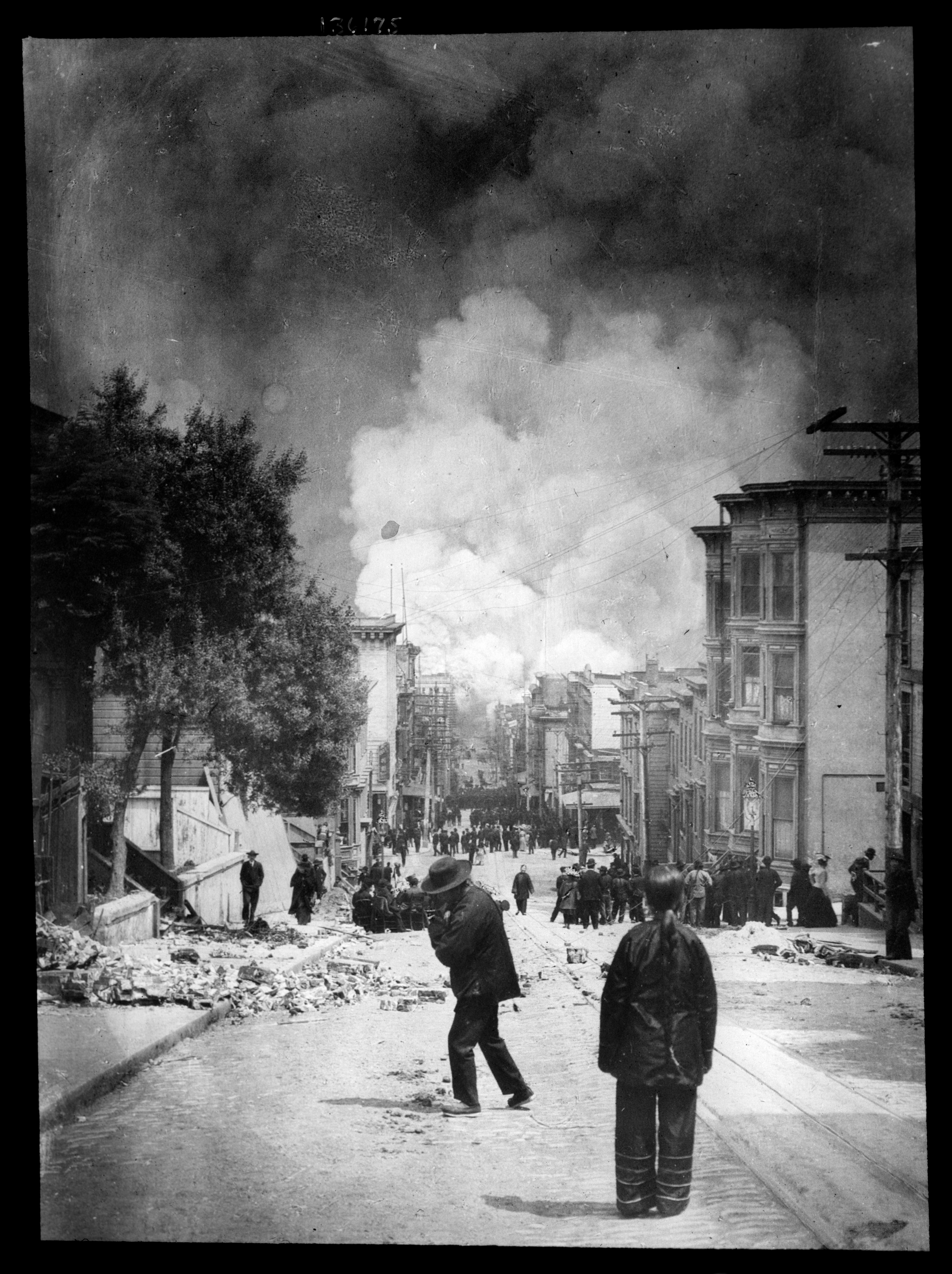
Looking east down Clay St at the Great Fire on April 18, 1906: Arnold Genthe

The Chinatown neighborhood was completely destroyed in the 1906 earthquake and fire that leveled most of the city. "The fire had full sway, and Chinatown, for the removal of which many a scheme has been devised, is but a memory." Oakland Tribune, April 1906.

==== Relocation attempt ====
Plans to relocate Chinatown predated the earthquake several years. At the 1901 Chinese Exclusion Convention held in San Francisco, A. Sbarboro called Chinatown "synonymous with disease, dirt and unlawful deeds" that "give[s] us nothing but evil habits and noxious stenches".

With Chinatown completely demolished by the Great Fire, which ended on April 21, 1906, the City seized the chance to remove the Chinese from the old downtown business district. Certain city officials and real-estate developers made more formal plans to move Chinatown to the Hunters Point neighborhood at the southern edge of the city, or even further south to Daly City. Abe Ruef, the political boss widely considered to be the power behind Mayor Eugene Schmitz, invited himself to become part of the Committee of Fifty and, within a week of the end of the Great Fire, on Saturday, April 27, 1906, formed an additional Subcommittee on Relocating the Chinese, because he felt the land was too valuable for Chinese.

Opposition arose, however, from politicians who feared that the removal of the Chinese would affect San Francisco's lucrative trade with Asian countries. Moreover, the government of China was also opposed, and soon after the earthquake, Tsi Chi Chow, the first secretary of the Chinese legation in Washington, DC, arrived in San Francisco, conveying to California governor George Pardee the opposition of China's Empress Dowager Cixi to the plan. The representatives, "acting unofficially", stated "the only way to remove the Chinese from the old Chinatown would be to give them a place elsewhere that would be acceptable for their purpose, when they might be willing to move." The San Francisco Call reported it as "a vigorous protest" and noted that as the site of the Chinese consulate was the property of Imperial China, it could not be reassigned by the city.

On May 10, 1906, the subcommittee met with representatives from the Chinese community, the Chinese Six Companies, who said that they would either rebuild in their old Chinatown quarters or move across the bay to Oakland, where most of the Chinatown refugees had fled. Other community leaders pointed out that displaced residents may not stop to resettle in Hunters Point, moving further to other West Coast cities like Seattle or Los Angeles, taking the pool of cheap labor with them. On July 8, 1906, after 25 committee meetings and considering various alternative sites in the city, the subcommittee submitted a final report stating their inability to drive the Chinese from their old Chinatown quarters. Ironically, plans to relocate Chinatown failed in the end because restrictive housing covenants in other areas of the city prohibited Chinese from settling elsewhere. In any event, the ability to rebuild in their old Chinatown quarters was the first significant victory for the Chinese community in Chinatown.

==== Rebuilding ====
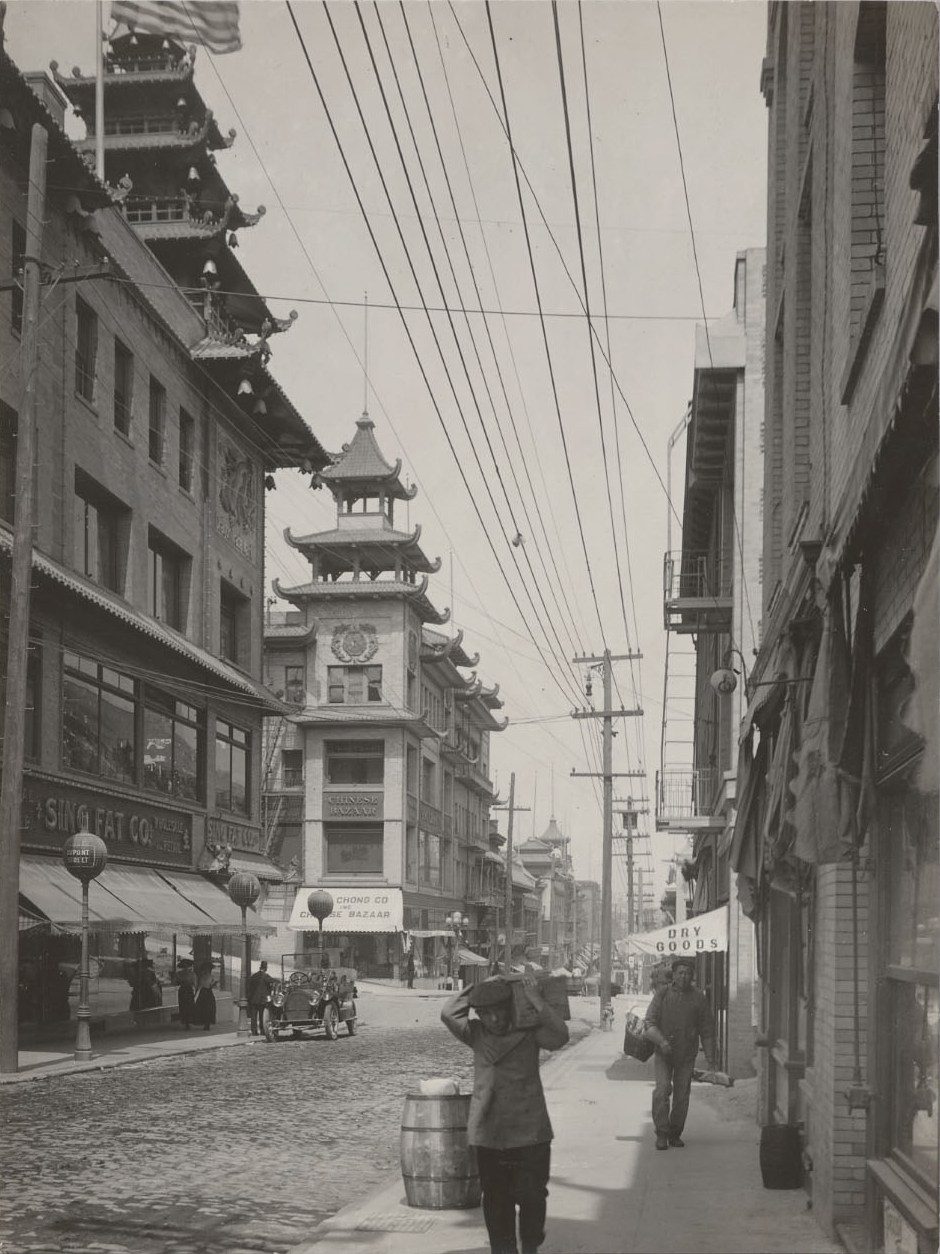
c.1910

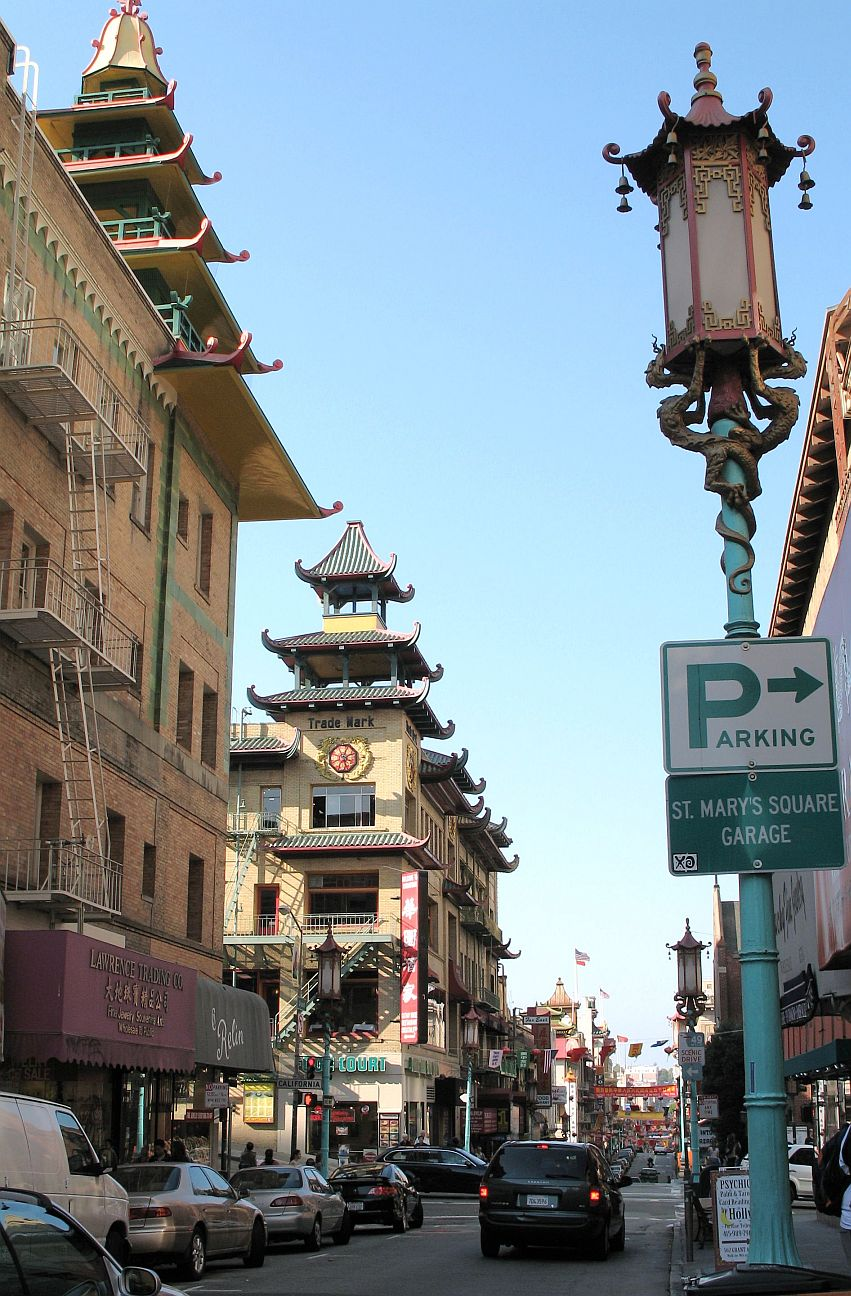
2006

Looking north along Grant from the intersection of Grant and Pine. The distinctive pagoda-topped roofs of the Sing Fat and Sing Chong buildings are on the left side of each picture. The dragon street lamp (right) was installed in 1925 for the San Francisco Diamond Jubilee Festival.

Even when the Subcommittee was bringing its relocation attempt to an end, the Chinese were already rebuilding, albeit with temporary wooden buildings which did not require permits. By June 10, 1906, twelve Chinese businesses were opened in Chinatown, including a couple of cafes. The actual reconstruction did not begin until October 1, 1906, when the City granted 43 building permits to Chinese businesses. By the time of the first post-quake Chinese New Year in 1907, several dozen buildings were completed, using old bricks unburnt by the fire, and Chinatown was filled with happy people. The reconstruction of Chinatown was completed more or less in 1908, a year ahead of the rest of the city.

While the city's proposals to relocate Chinatown failed, the directive of rebuilding Chinatown into an attractive district along orientalized and stereotyped conceptions still gained traction. A group of Chinese merchants, including Mendocino-born Look Tin Eli, hired American architects to design in a Chinese-motif "Oriental" style in order to promote tourism in the rebuilt Chinatown. The results of this design strategy were the pagoda-topped buildings of the Sing Chong and Sing Fat bazaars on the west corners of Grant Ave (then Dupont St) and California St, which have become icons of San Francisco Chinatown.

This design strategy leveraged the ethnic identity and exoticness that city planners used to justify the relocation of Chinatown to become the same forces that made the area an attractive tourist location. In constructing "Oriental" style architecture, the area gratified Western fascination with and perception of a stereotyped Chinese identity. Opportunistic individuals from within the Chinese community and from outside the Chinese community made entrepreneurial gains from this "ethnic tourism" as it emerged in the early 1900s and boosted local business.

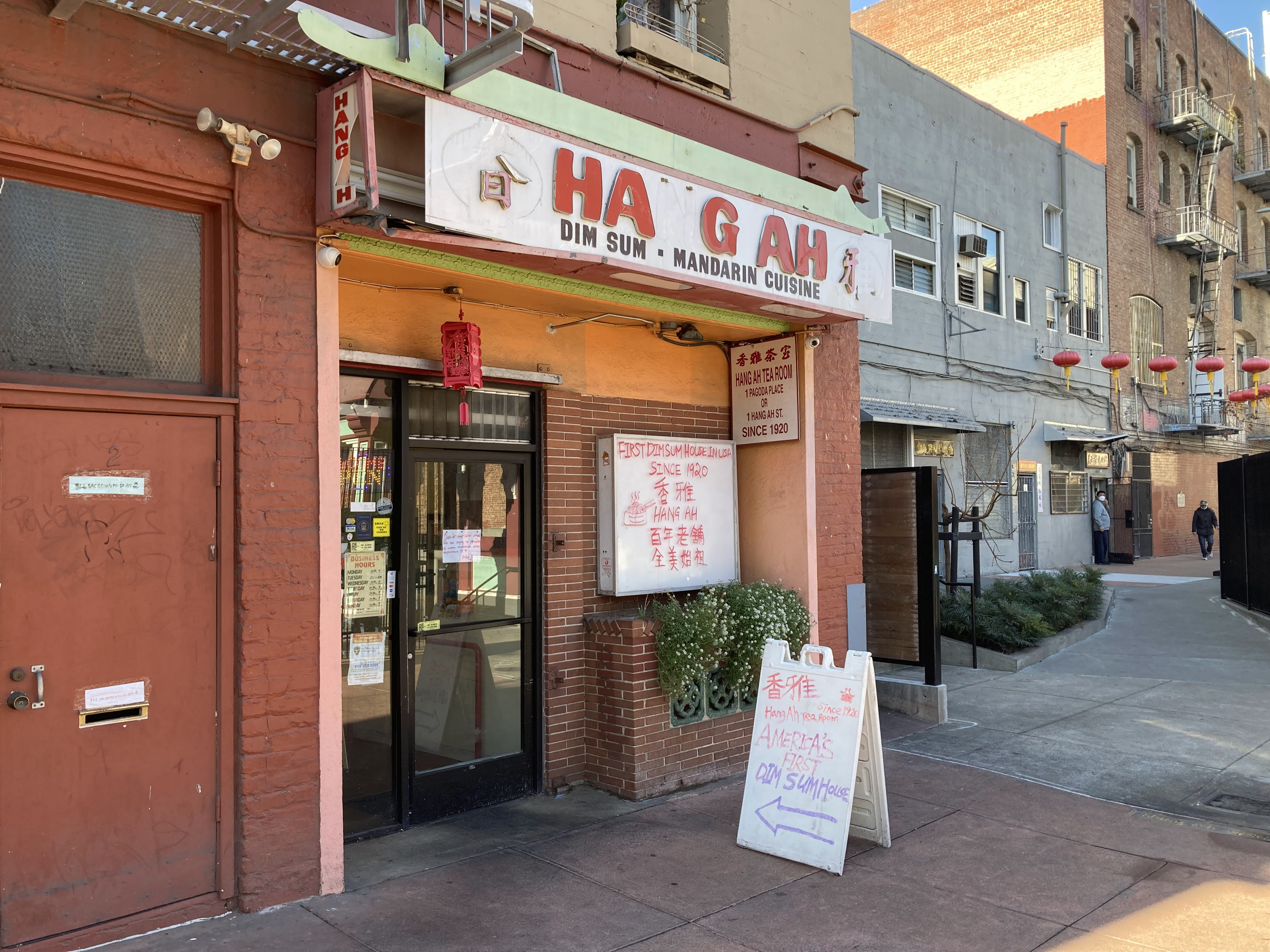
The Hang Ah Tea Room opened in 1920 on Hang Ah Street. It has claims as the oldest dim sum restaurant in the United States.

In November 1907, an article extolling the virtues of the "new Chinatown of San Francisco" was written, praising the new "substantial, modern, fireproof buildings of brick and stone ... following the Oriental style of architecture" and declaring "[n]o more picturesque squalor, no more gambling dens, opium joints or public haunts of vice" would be tolerated, at the command of the Chinese Six Companies. By then, 5,000 residents had returned, of the estimated 30,000 that lived in Chinatown prior to the quake.

When the earthquake destroyed Chinatown's wooden tenements, it also dealt a blow to the tongs. Criminal tongs continued on until the 1920s, when legitimate Chinese merchants and a more capable Chinatown Squad under Sgt. Jack Manion gained the upper hand. Manion was appointed leader of the Squad in 1921 and served for two decades. Stiffer legislation against prostitution and drugs ended the tongs. The Chinatown Squad was finally disbanded in August 1955 by Police Chief George Healey, upon the request of the influential Chinese World newspaper, which had editorialized the Squad was an "affront to Americans of Chinese descent".

The rhetoric of a "New Chinatown" obscured the reality of the community's perpetuating problems, particularly those of poverty, overcrowding, and racial discrimination. While the Chinese merchants succeeded in rebuilding in a tourist-attractive way, they could not influence the landlords, most of which were not Chinese, to provide adequate housing for the Chinese residents. In a 1930 Community Chest Survey of 153 Chinatown families, 32 families, with an average of five persons each, lived in one room each; only 19 families had complete bath tub, kitchen, and toilet facilities; on the average, there was one kitchen for 3.1 families and one toilet for 4.6 families (or 28.3 persons). Crowded inadequate living conditions contributed to a high death rate for the Chinese. The Chinese were no longer a problem for the city; they were forgotten.

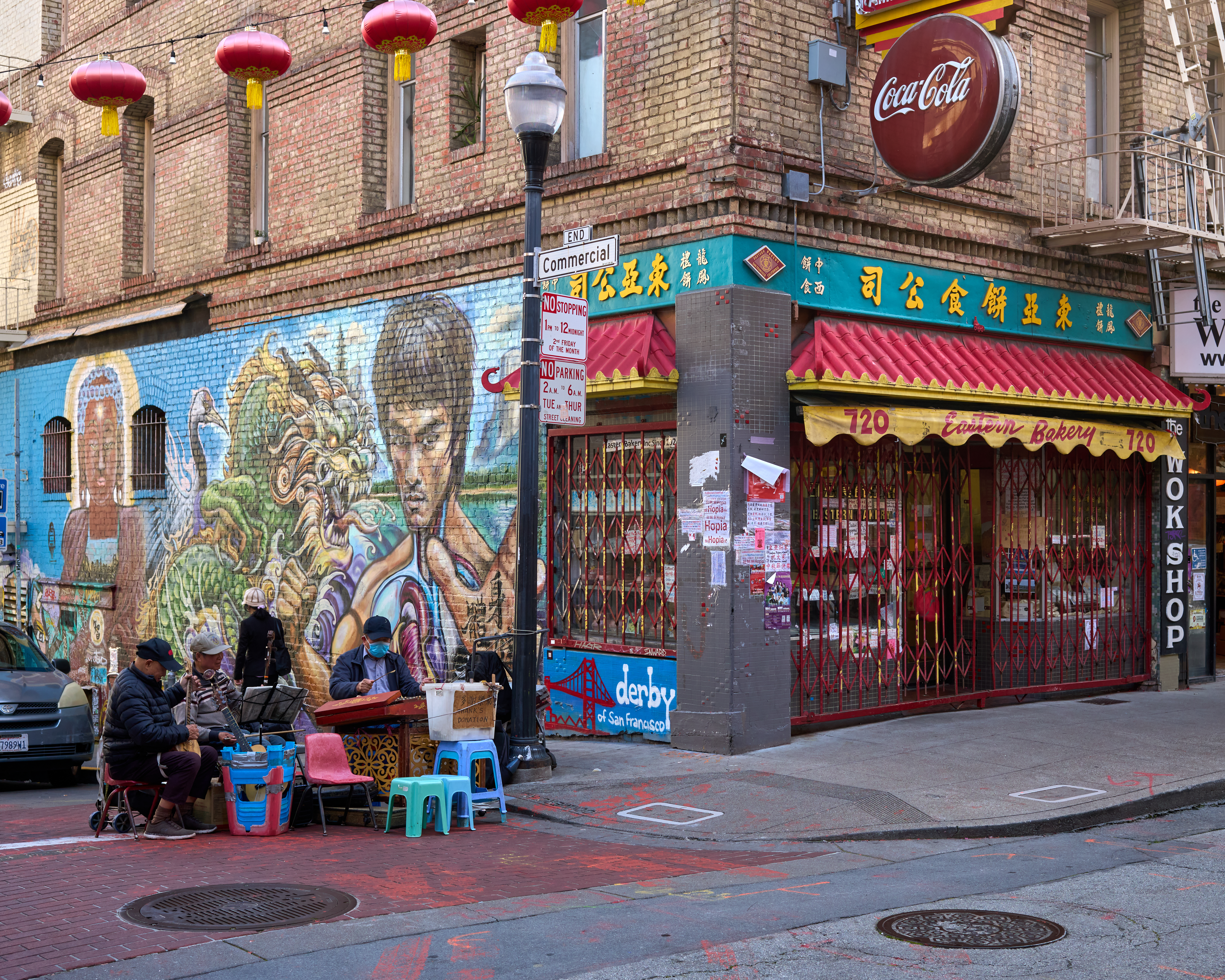
Corner of Commercial and Grant in 2026

By 1947, Chinatown established itself as a central tourist destination and a rapidly developing community. Tension began to arise between businesses in Chinatown seeking to modernize and city planning committees seeking to maintain the "Oriental" look of the area. Similar to the post-earthquake discussion, Chinatown remained a contested space for conflicting visions of the area's development. In 1947, the Board of Supervisors proposed a building code prohibiting architectural changes to the area. Opposition to these preservationist initiatives came from Chinese business owners and some of the architects who designed the buildings, among others. These individuals saw such building codes or architectural regulations as hindering the progress of the community and treating it as a static ethnic icon.

==== Nightlife ====
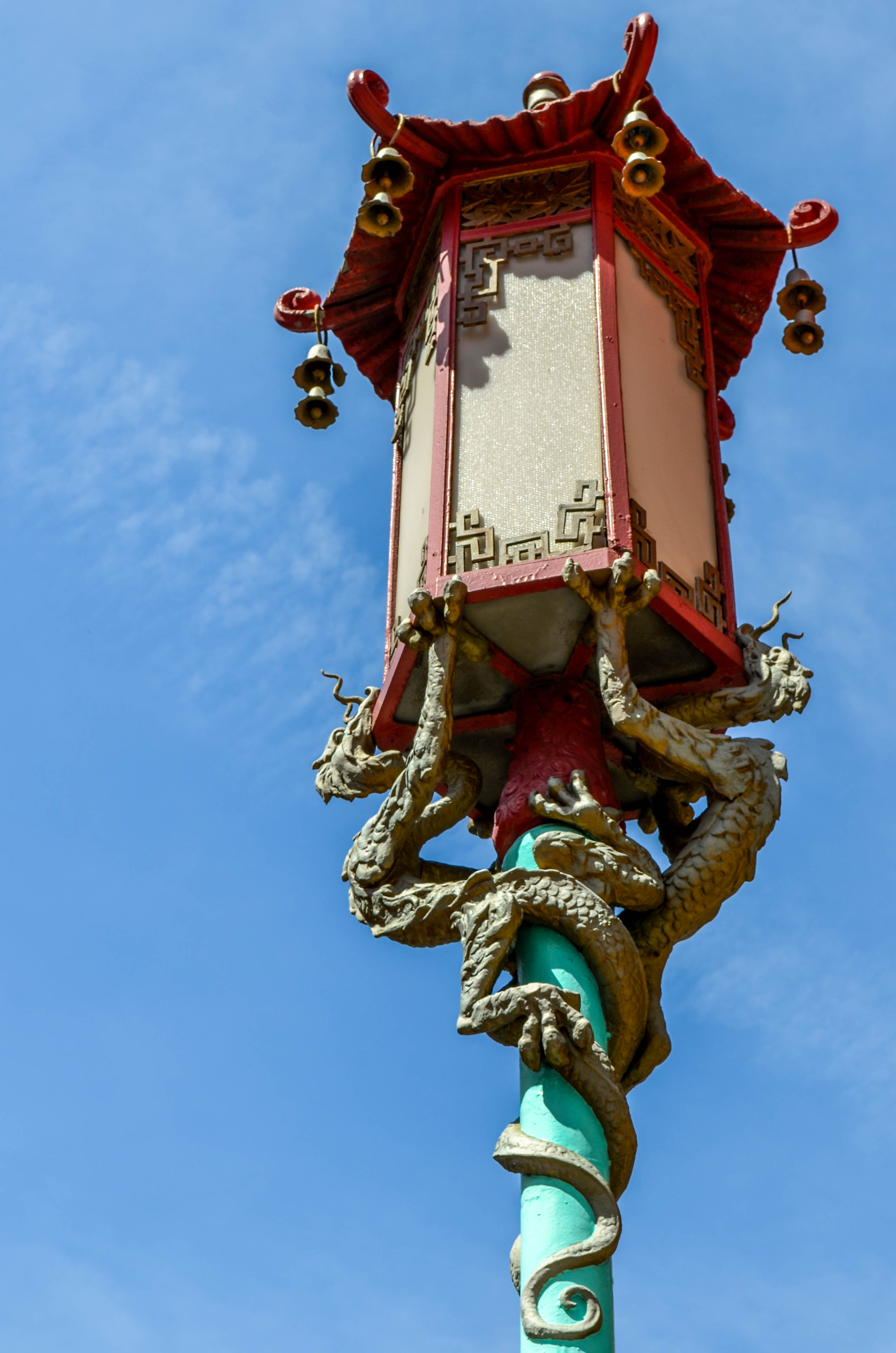
Dragon Street Lamp on Grant Ave

The famous Sam Wo restaurant opened in 1912.

In 1925, for the celebration of the San Francisco Diamond Jubilee, the Downtown Merchants Association, the Chinese Chamber of Commerce, and the San Francisco Diamond Jubilee Festival jointly raised $18,000 for 43 dragon street lamps to be cast in China and installed along Grant Avenue from Bush Street to Broadway. Designed by W(alter) D'Arcy Ryan, who also designed the "Path of Gold" streetlights along Market Street, the distinctive 2,750 pounds (1,250 kg) street lamp, painted in traditional Chinese colors of red, gold and green, was composed of a cast-iron hexagonal base supporting a lotus and bamboo shaft surmounted with two cast-aluminum dragons below a pagoda lantern with bells and topped by a stylized hexagonal red roof—all in keeping with the Oriental style pioneered by Look Tin Eli (1910). The new lamps made Grant Avenue one of the brightest streets in the City at night, at a cost of US$418 (equivalent to $7,700 in 2025) each. Since then, the original molds were used to add 24 more dragon street lamps were in 1996 (distinguishable by the foundry, whose name and location in Emporia, Kansas is cast on an access door at the base), and later, 23 more were added along Pacific by PG&E.

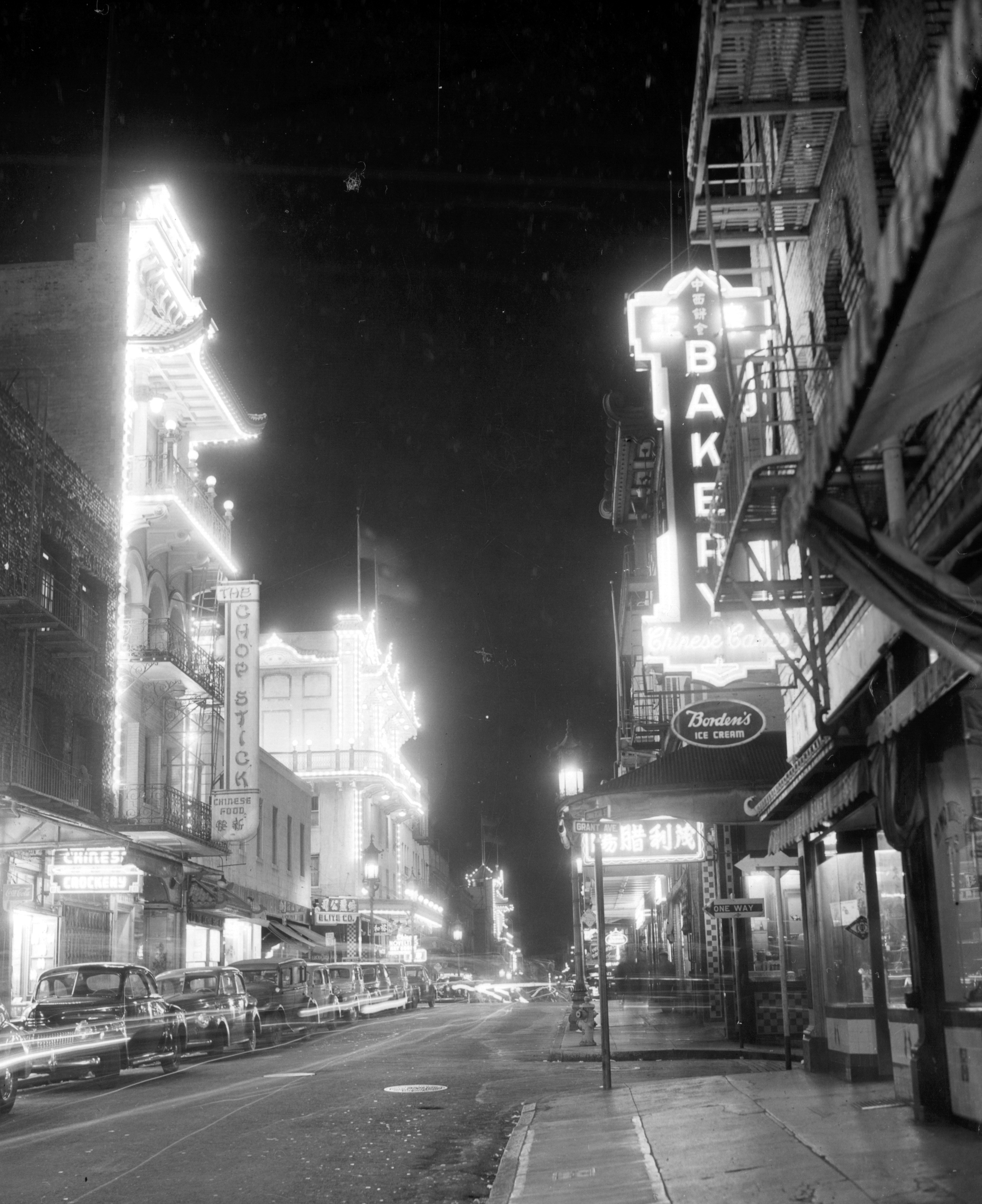
Chinatown (facing north from just south of the corner of Grant and Commercial) in 1945. Prominently lit buildings on the left (west) side of Grant include the Ying On (closer to camera) and Soo Yuen (in background); the Eastern Bakery sign is lit on the right (east) side of Grant.

During the Great Depression, many nightclubs and cocktail bars were started in Chinatown. The Forbidden City nightclub, located at 369 Sutter Street just outside Chinatown and run by Charlie Low, became one of the most famous entertainment places in San Francisco. While it was doing business, from the late 1930s to the late 1950s, the Forbidden City gained an international reputation with its unique showcase of exotic oriental performance from Chinese American performers. Another popular club for tourists and LGBT clients was Li Po, which, like Forbidden City, combined western entertainment with "Oriental" culture. It was advertised in a 1939 tourism guide book as a "jovial and informal Chinatown cocktail lounge" where one could find "love, passion, and nighttime".^{[16]} As of 2018, it was still in operation at 916 Grant Avenue.

==== World War II era and immigration reform ====
For the Chinese in Chinatown, the war came upon them in September 1931, when Japan attacked the Manchurian city of Mukden, and became impossible to ignore in July 1937, when Japan launched a major offensive southward from their base in Manchuria towards the heart of China. In response, the Chinese Six Companies convened many community organizations together, from which was founded the Chinese War Relief Association, to raise funds from the Chinatown communities throughout the U.S. to aid civilians trapped by the war in China. In San Francisco's Chinatown, a popular means to raise money for war relief was through the Rice Bowl parades and parties, where the appeal to fill the rice bowls of starving children victimized by the war in China resonated with the Chinatown community. One hallmark of the Rice Bowl parade was the striking scene of a large number of Chinese-American women in fashionable Chinese dress (the cheongsam) carrying one huge Chinese flag spanning the width of the street, onto which money was thrown from balconies, windows, and sidewalks. In the Rice Bowl parade and party of 1938, San Francisco Chinatown raised $55,000; the second Rice Bowl in 1940 collected $87,000; and the third in 1941 brought in $93,000—all for war and hunger relief of civilians in war-torn China.

As Chinese Americans became more visible in the public eye during the period leading to the U.S. involvement in the war, the negative image of China and the Chinese began to erode.

— K. Scott Wong

Once China became an ally to the U.S. in World War II, a positive image of the Chinese began to emerge. In October 1942, Earl Warren, running for Governor of California, wrote, "Like all native born Californians, I have cherished during my entire life a warm and cordial feeling for the Chinese people." In her goodwill tour of the U.S. starting in February 1943, Madame Chiang Kai Shek probably did more to change the American attitude towards the Chinese people than any other single person. She was hosted by the First Lady and President Franklin D. Roosevelt; she was the second woman and the first Chinese to address the U.S. Congress. The American public embraced her with respect and kindness, which is in stark contrast to the treatment of most Chinese immigrants and Chinese Americans. To the Chinese in Chinatown, she became an icon of the war years.

In December 1943, in recognition of the important role of China as an ally in the war, the Chinese Exclusion Act was repealed by the Magnuson Act, which allowed for naturalization but restricted Chinese immigrants to a small annual quota of 105 new entry visas. The repeal of the Exclusion Act and other immigration restriction laws, in conjunction with passage of the War Brides Act in December 1945, allowed Chinese-American veterans to bring their families outside of national quotas and led to a major population boom in the area during the 1950s. However, tight quotas on new immigration from China still applied until the Immigration and Nationality Act of 1965 was passed.

In the 1948 landmark case of Shelley v. Kraemer, the U.S. Supreme Court ruled without dissent that enforcing racially restrictive covenants in property deeds violates the Equal Protection Clause of the Fourteenth Amendment and thus such covenants are unenforceable in court, which lifted the invisible walls around Chinatown, permitting some Chinese Americans to move out of the Gilded Ghetto into other neighborhoods of the city and gain a foothold on the middle class. Twenty years later, such racially restrictive covenants were outlawed in the 1968 Fair Housing Act.

==== Frank Wong dioramas ====
San Francisco artist Frank Wong created miniature dioramas that depict Chinatown during the 1930s and 1940s. In 2004, Wong donated seven miniatures of scenes of Chinatown, titled "The Chinatown Miniatures Collection," to the Chinese Historical Society of America (CHSA). The dioramas are on permanent display in CHSA's Main Gallery.

=== 1960s–present ===
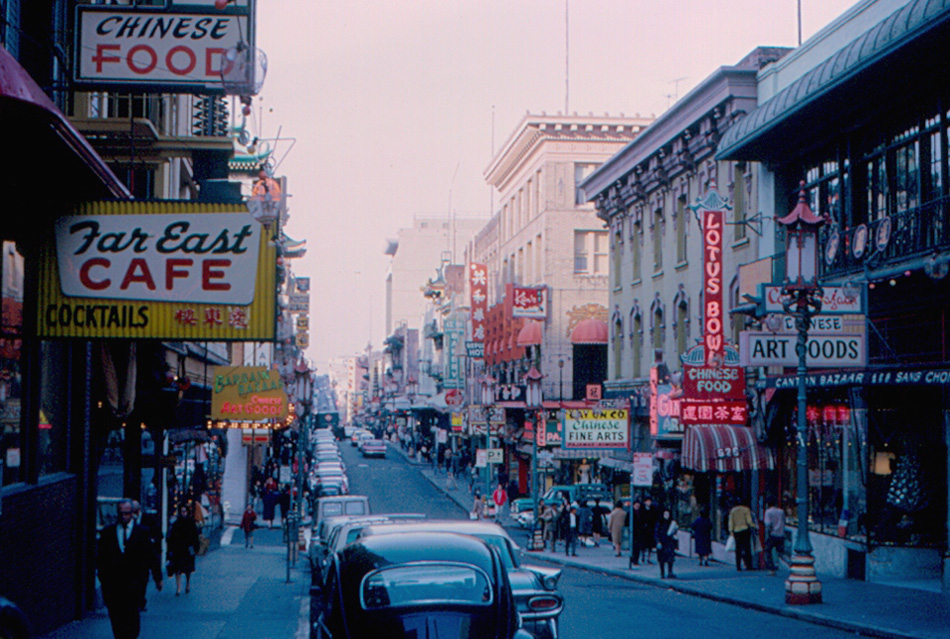
View north along Grant Avenue, approximately taken from the sidewalk in front of 645 Grant (1965).

In the 1960s, the shifting of under-utilized national immigration quotas brought in another huge wave of immigrants, mostly from Hong Kong. This changed San Francisco Chinatown from predominantly Hlay Yip Wah (Sze Yup or Hoisan Wah)-speaking to Sam Yup Wah (standard Cantonese)-speaking. During the same decade, many stores moved from Grant Avenue to Stockton Street, drawn by lower rents and the better transportation enabled by the 30-Stockton Muni trolleybus line.

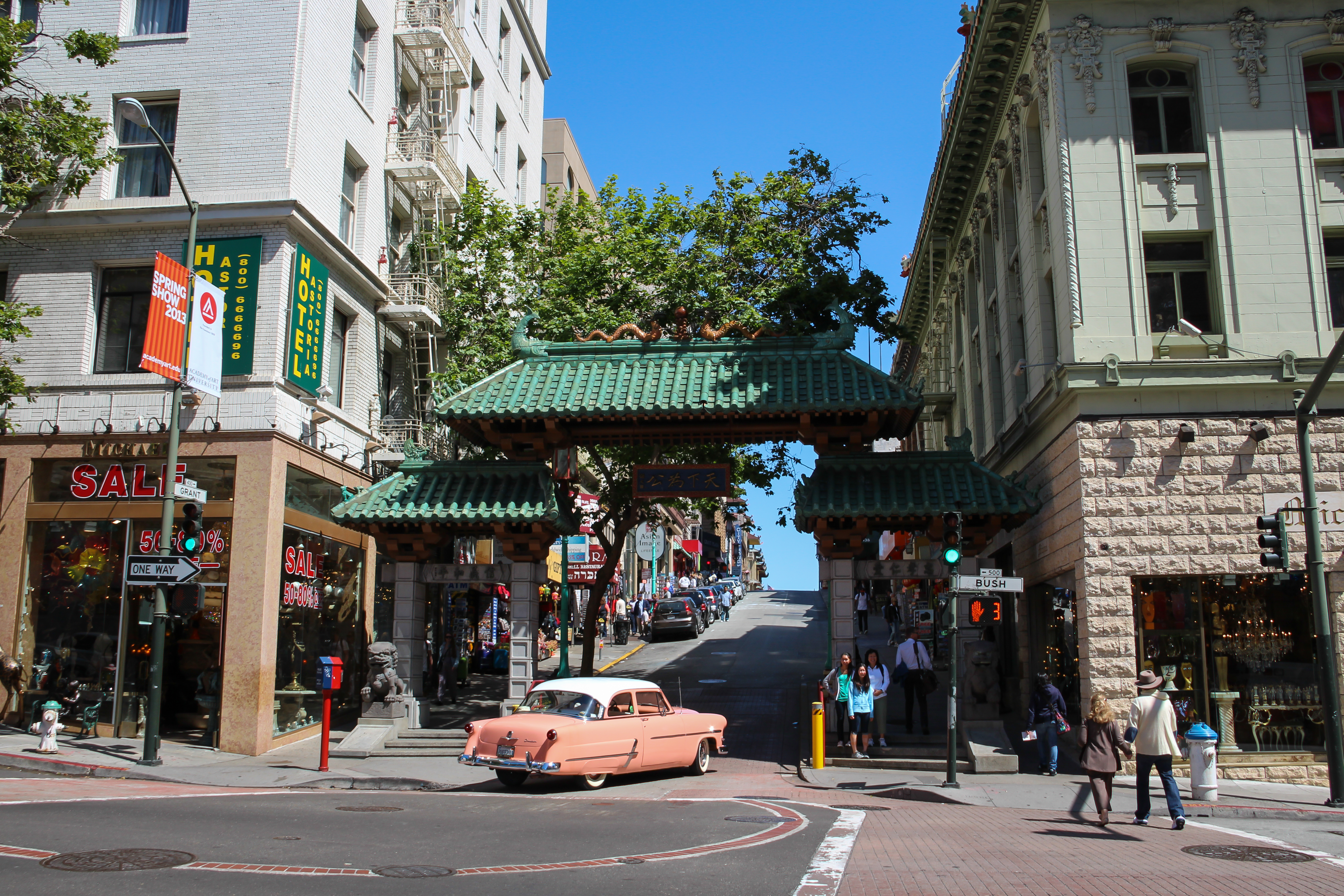
The Dragon Gate at Grant and Bush, now a prominent landmark, was dedicated in 1970.

There were areas where many Chinese in Northern California living outside of San Francisco Chinatown could maintain small communities or individual businesses. Nonetheless, the historic rights of property owners to deed or sell their property to whomever they pleased was exercised enough to keep the Chinese community from spreading. However, in 1948, Shelley v. Kraemer, the Supreme Court had ruled that racially restrictive covenants in deeds are unenforceable in courts due to the 14th amendment equal protection clause; and in 1968 the Fair Housing Act outlawed racially restrictive covenants. This ruling and law allowed the enlargement of Chinatown and an increase in the Chinese population of the city. At the same time, the declining white population of the city as a result of White Flight combined to change the demographics of the city. Neighborhoods that were once predominately white, such as Richmond District and Sunset District and in other suburbs across the San Francisco Bay Area became centers of new Chinese immigrant communities.

Until 1979, the United States recognized the Republic of China in Taiwan as the sole legitimate government of all of China, and emigration from Taiwan was counted under the same grouping as that for mainland China, from which little emigration to the United States existed from 1949 on. In 1979, the opening up of the People's Republic of China and the breaking of diplomatic relations with the Republic of China led to the passage of the Taiwan Relations Act, which placed Taiwan under a separate immigration group from the People's Republic of China. As a result of the Immigration Act of 1990, emigration from Hong Kong was also considered a separate jurisdiction for the purpose of recording such statistics. Thus, Mandarin-speaking emigrants from Taiwan began to arrive in the Bay Area, and they have tended to settle in suburban Millbrae, Cupertino, Milpitas, Mountain View, and even San Jose – avoiding San Francisco as well as Oakland Chinatowns.

==== Gang violence ====
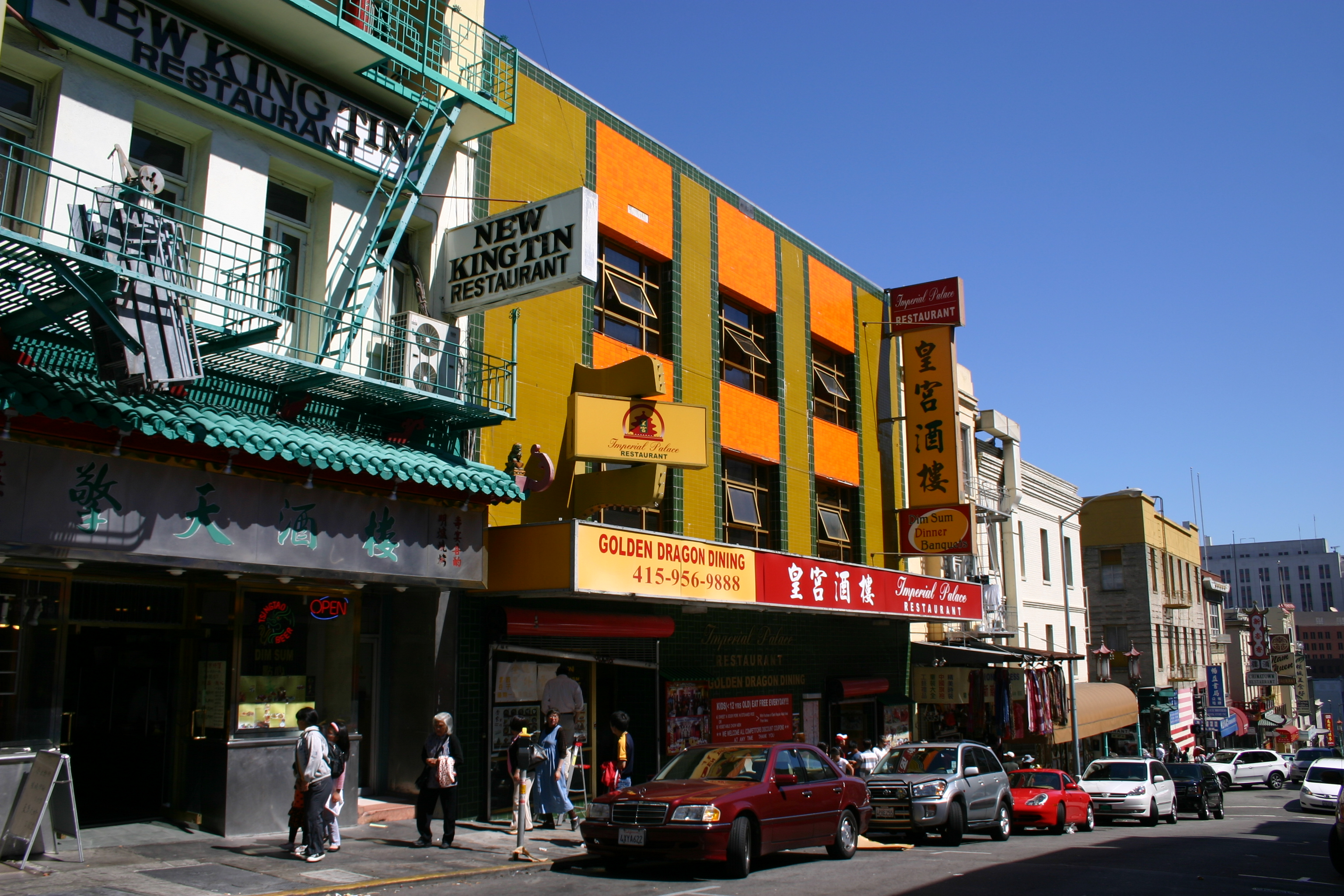
Imperial Palace Restaurant in 2010. The Imperial Palace replaced the Golden Dragon in the same space at 816 Washington.

With these changes came a weakening of the Tongs' traditional grip on Chinese life. Newer Chinese groups often came from areas outside of the Tongs' control, so the influence of the Tongs and criminal groups associated with them, such as the Triads, grew weaker in Chinatown and the Chinese community. However, the presence of the Asian gangs remained significant in the immigrant community, and in the summer of 1977, an ongoing rivalry between two street gangs, the Wah Ching and the Joe Boys, erupted in violence and bloodshed, culminating in a shooting spree at the Golden Dragon Restaurant on Washington Street. Five people were killed and eleven wounded, none of whom were gang members. The incident has become infamously known as the Golden Dragon massacre. Five perpetrators, who were members of the Joe Boys gang, were convicted of murder and assault charges and were sentenced to prison. The Golden Dragon closed in January 2006 because of health violations, and later reopened as the Imperial Palace Restaurant.

Other notorious acts of violence have taken place in Chinatown since 1977. At 2 a.m. on May 14, 1990, San Francisco residents who had just left The Purple Onion, a nightclub located where Chinatown borders on North Beach, were shot as they entered their cars. 35-year-old Michael Bit Chen Wu was killed and six others were injured, among them a critically wounded pregnant woman. In June 1998, shots were fired at Chinese Playground, wounding six teenagers, three of them critically. A 16-year-old boy was arrested for the shooting, which was believed to be gang-related. On February 27, 2006, Allen Leung was shot to death in his business on Jackson Street; Raymond "Shrimp Boy" Chow, who succeeded Leung as head of the Ghee Kung Tong, was later convicted in 2016 of soliciting Leung's murder as fallout from the corruption investigation of Leland Yee, and Raymond "Skinny Ray" Lei was indicted for committing the murder in 2017.

==== Developments of tourism ====
As Chinatown's ill reputation reemerged in the 1970s with the publicized gang crimes and continued neglect of substandard housing in the area, tourism began to decline. Visitors perceived the area as a "ghetto" taking their commercial business elsewhere. As Chinatown's tourist industry suffered, the entire area's once stable economy suffered. To counter this image, the Chinese Six Companies and other Chinese merchants began heavily emphasizing the safety and attractiveness of visiting the area. These marketing efforts alongside quieter initiatives to improve conditions for residents throughout the 1970s enabled the area's tourism-dependent economy to continue functioning. Similar dynamics of area leaders internally addressing social issues while externally maintaining commercial tourist appeal continued to the end of the 1900s.

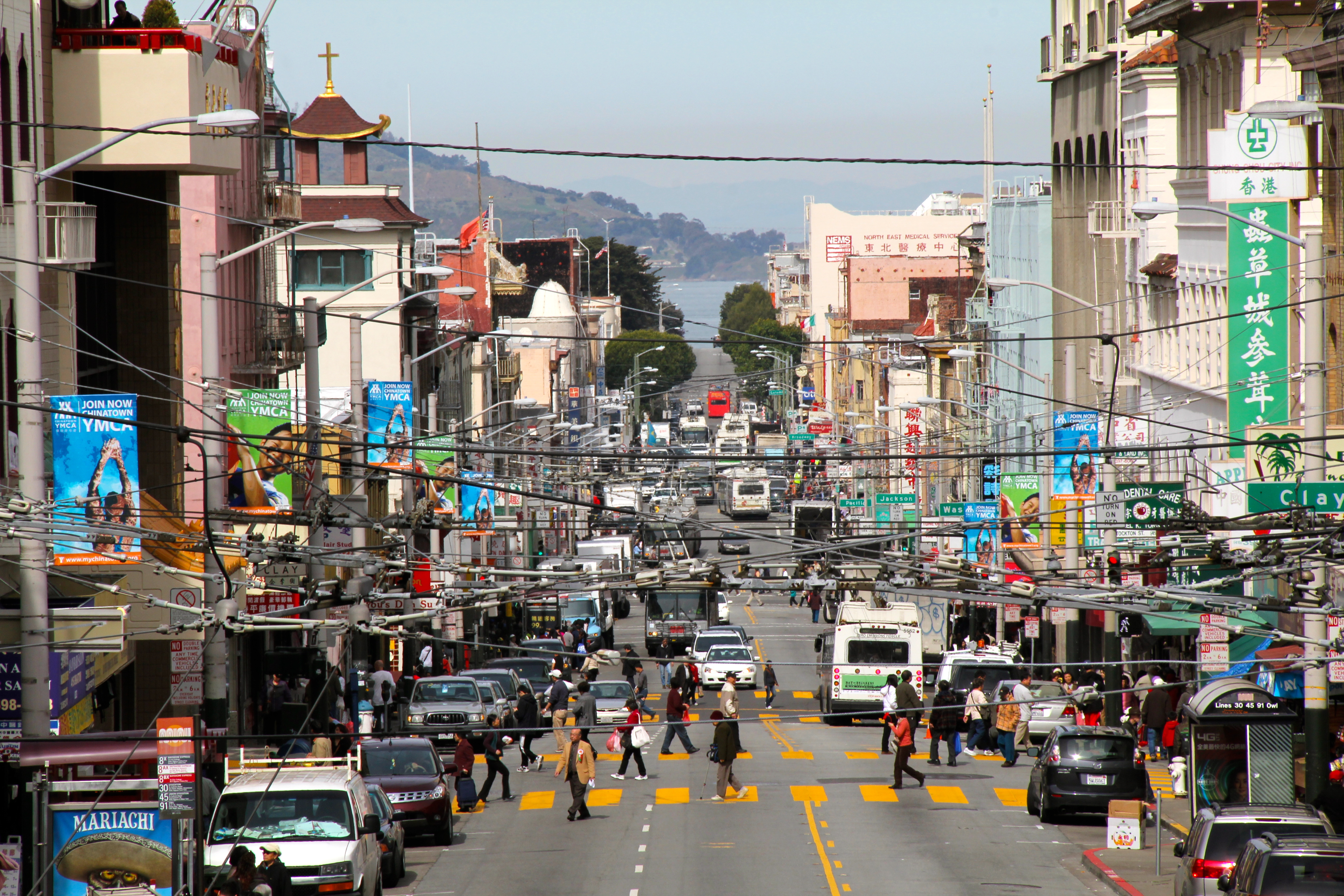
View north along Stockton from atop the north portal of the Stockton Street Tunnel in 2011

== Culture ==
=== Institutions ===
San Francisco's Chinatown is home to the Chinese Consolidated Benevolent Association (known as the Chinese Six Companies), which is the umbrella organization for local Chinese family and regional associations in this Chinatown. It has spawned lodges in other Western U.S. Chinatowns in the late 19th and early 20th centuries, including Chinatown, Los Angeles and Chinatown, Portland.

The Chinese Culture Center is a community based non-profit organization located on the third floor of the Hilton San Francisco Financial District, across Kearny Street from Portsmouth Square. The Center promotes exhibitions about Chinese life in the United States and organizes tours of the area. The Chinese Historical Society of America is housed in a building designed by Julia Morgan as a YWCA, at 965 Clay.

Selected locations in Chinatown, San Francisco
No	Name	Year	Address	Notability	Image
1	Dragon Gate	1970	Grant at Bush	Southern entrance to Chinatown on Grant. One of the most photographed locations.	
2	Saint Mary's Square	—	651 California	Features statue of Dr. Sun Yat-sen, by Beniamino Bufano and a memorial for Chinese-American veterans of World Wars I and II.	
3	Sing Chong building	1907	601–615 Grant	Designed by Ross & Burgren and among the earliest buildings erected after the 1906 earthquake. Strong influence on Chinatown architecture.	
3	Sing Fat building	1907	573 Grant	Designed by Ross & Burgren and among the earliest buildings erected after the 1906 earthquake. Strong influence on Chinatown architecture.	
4	Nam Kue Chinese School	1925	755 Sacramento	Private school offering classes in Chinese culture, history, and language.	
5	Portsmouth Square	1800s	733 Kearny	Oldest public space in San Francisco.	
6	Chinese Telephone Exchange	1909	743 Washington	All calls to Chinatown were routed by name and occupation until 1948.	
7	Tin How Temple	1910	125 Waverly	Oldest Taoist temple in Chinatown.	
8	Ross Alley	1849	Between Jackson, Washington, Grant, and Stockton	Often used as a backdrop for films.	
8	Golden Gate Fortune Cookie Company	1962	56 Ross Alley	Working fortune cookie factory and shop.	
9	Chinese Hospital	1925 (demolished), 1977, 2017	845 Jackson	Only Chinese-language hospital in United States.	
10	Chinese Historical Society of America	1932	965 Clay	Former YWCA building designed by Julia Morgan	
11	Six Companies	c.1907 (remodeled 1950s)	843 Stockton	Sometimes called the "White House" of Chinatown.	

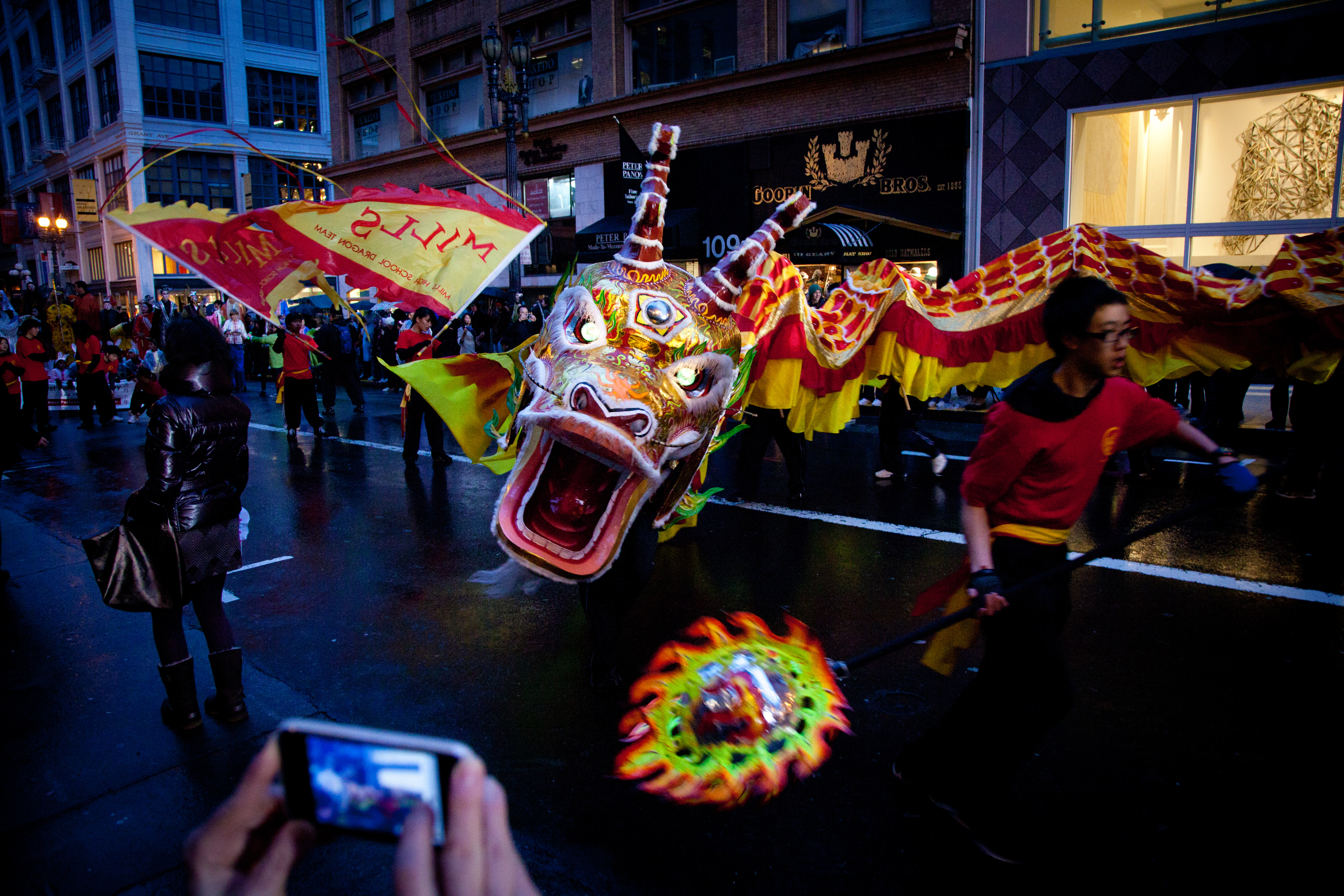
Dragon on Geary, 2011

=== Events and festivals ===
In the 1950s, during the Korean war, a number of Chinese-American leaders, led by W. K. Wong, organized the San Francisco Chinese New Year Festival and Parade, including art shows, street dances, martial arts, music, and a fashion show. The 1953 parade was led by Korean war veteran, Joe Wong, and featured the Miss Chinatown festival queen and the dragon. By 1958, the festival queen had been formally expanded into the pageant of "Miss Chinatown U.S.A". In 1994, around 120 queer Asian Americans joined the annual parade, which was the first time that Asian American queer community had appeared in public and gained acceptance from Chinese-American society.

San Francisco Chinatown's annual Autumn Moon Festival celebrates seasonal change and the opportunity to give thanks to a bountiful summer harvest. The Moon Festival is popularly celebrated throughout China and surrounding countries each year, with local bazaars, entertainment, and mooncakes, a pastry filled with sweet bean paste and egg. The festival is held each year during mid-September, and is free to the public.

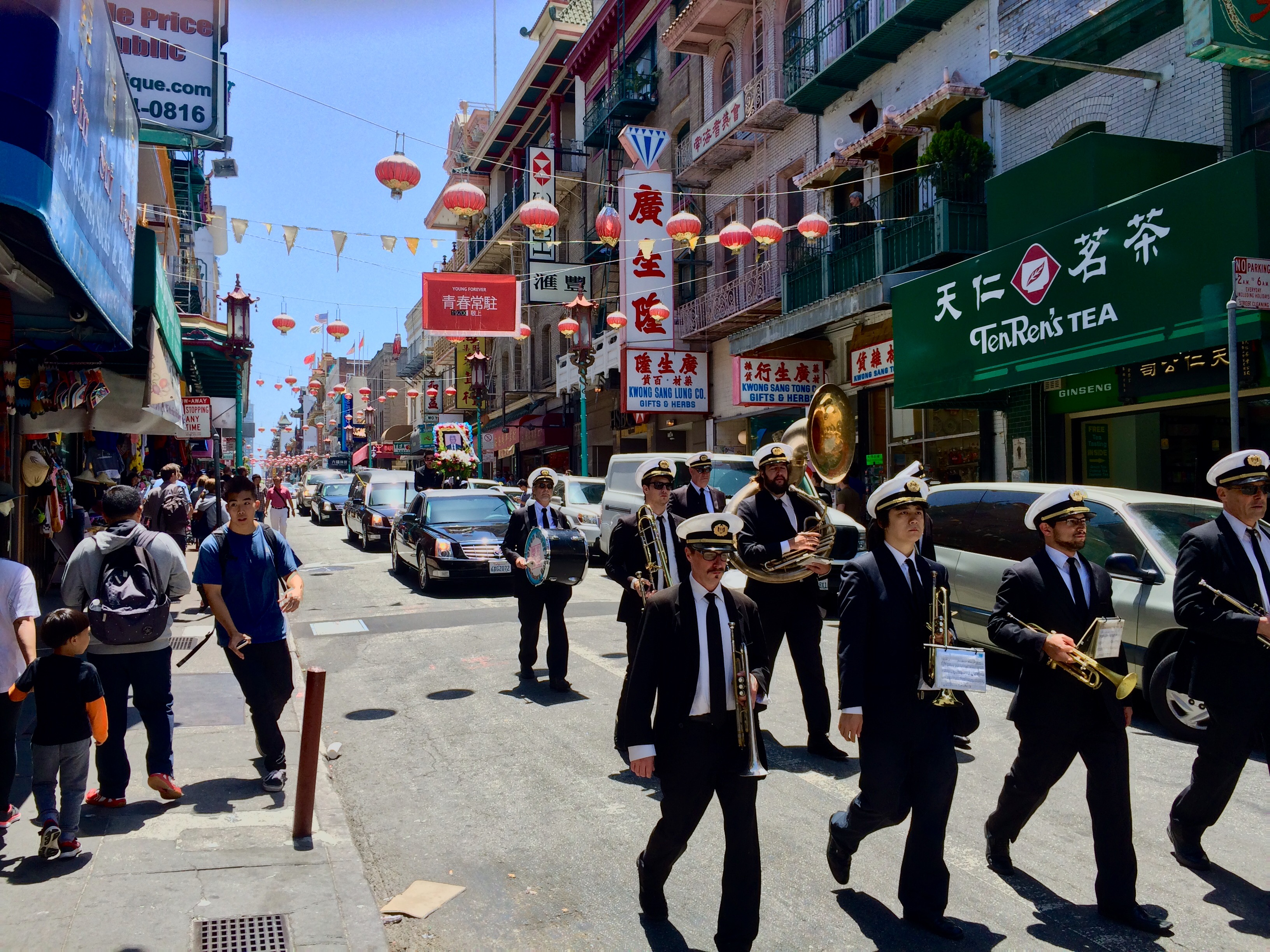
Funeral procession in Chinatown along Grant with marching band, taken facing south near the corner of Grant and Jackson, 2016

Chinatown is frequently the venue of traditional Chinese funeral processions, where a marching band (playing Western songs such as Nearer, My God, to Thee) takes the street with a motorcycle escort. The band is followed by a car displaying an image of the deceased (akin to the Chinese custom of parading a scroll with his or her name through the village), and the hearse and the mourners, who then usually travel to Colma south of San Francisco for the actual funeral. By union regulation, the procession route starts at the Green Street Mortuary proceeding on Stockton Street for six blocks and back on Grant Avenue, taking about one hour.

=== Chinatown Community Development Center ===
Chinatown Community Development Center is an organization formed in 1977 after the merger of the Chinatown Resource center and the Chinese Community Housing Corporation. The organization was started by Gordon Chin, who served as executive director since 1977 until he was succeeded by the organization's Deputy Director Rev. Norman Fong on October 1, 2011. The organization advocates and provides services to San Francisco's Chinatown. They have also started many groups, Adopt-An-Alleyway Youth Empowerment Project being the most notable, and have been involved with many tenant programs.

== Media and politics ==
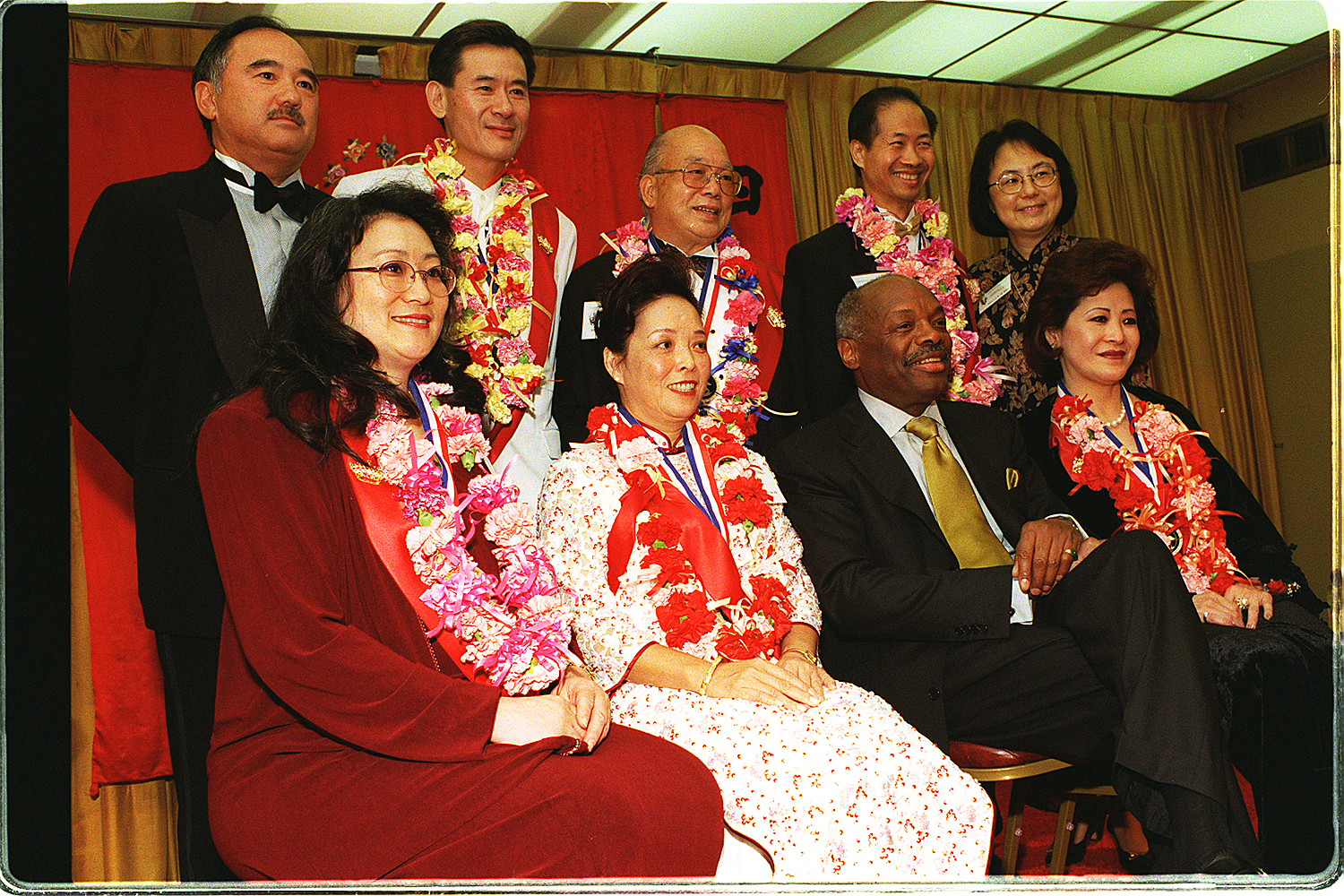
SF Mayor Willie Brown attends a Chinese New Year Celebration in Chinatown (1999).

In the citywide Board of Supervisors elections, Chinatown forms part of District Three and in 2014 accounted for 44% of both registered voters and ballots cast.

The Chinese World (1892–1970), in three floors of the building at 736 Grant, was the oldest Chinese language paper in the United States.

The Sing Tao Daily and World Journal are the two main newspapers read among residents.

== Fame ==
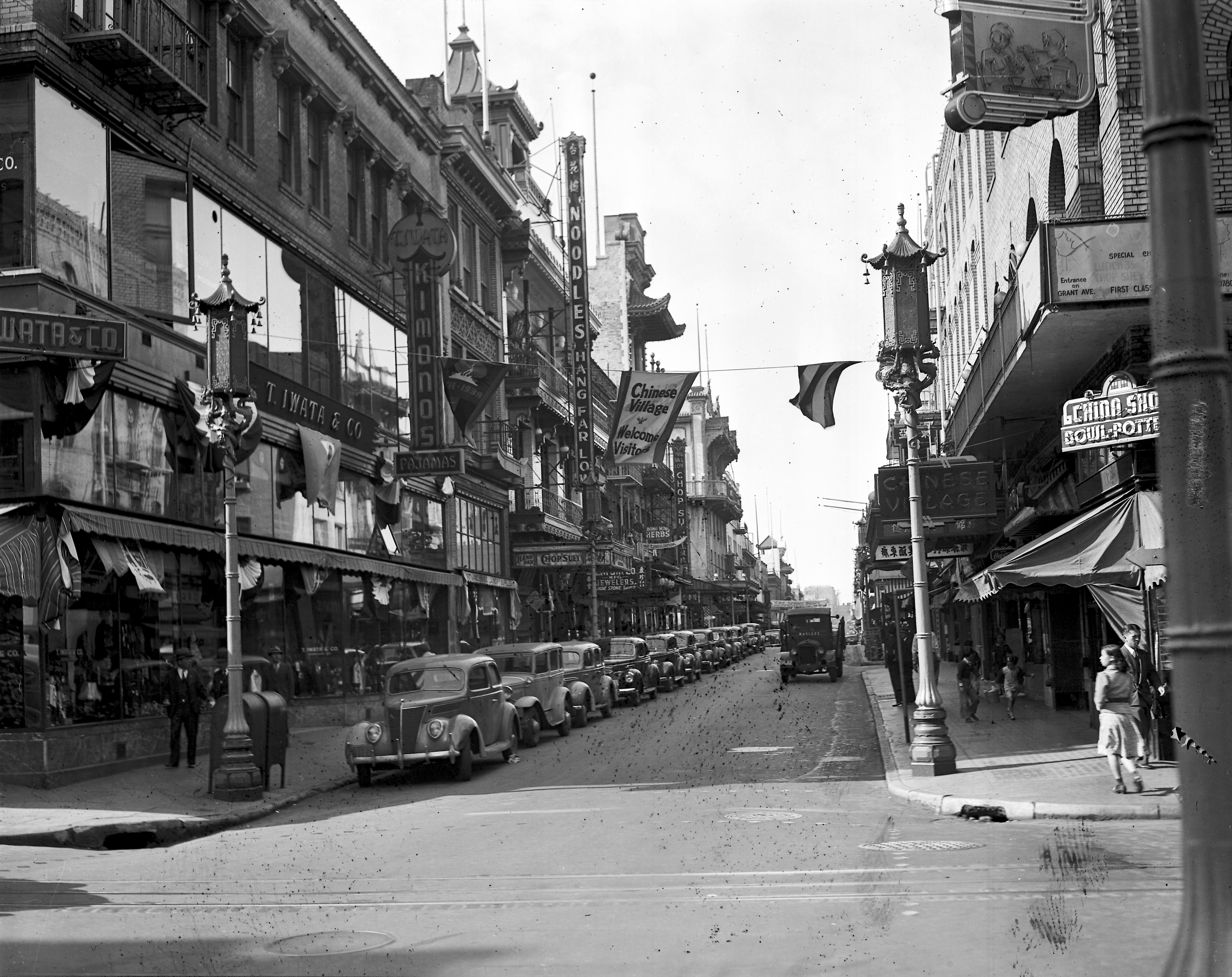
Chop Suey neon signs, Grant Avenue, circa 1943

San Francisco Chinatown restaurants are considered to be the birthplace of Americanized Chinese cuisine such as food items like Chop Suey while introducing and popularizing Dim Sum to American tastes, as its Dim Sum tea houses are a major tourist attraction. Johnny Kan was the proprietor of one of the first modern style Chinese restaurants, which opened in 1953. Many of the district's restaurants have been featured in food television programs on Chinese cuisine such as Martin Yan's Martin Yan - Quick & Easy.

The Chinatown has served as a backdrop for several movies, television shows, plays and documentaries including The Maltese Falcon, Flower Drum Song, What's Up, Doc?, Chan Is Missing, Chinatown Kid, Big Trouble in Little China, The Presidio, The Dead Pool, Jackie Chan Adventures, The Pursuit of Happyness, Godzilla, Warrior, and Shang-Chi and the Legend of the Ten Rings.

Noted Chinese American writers grew up there such as Russell Leong. Contrary to popular belief, while the Chinese-American writer Amy Tan was inspired by Chinatown and its culture for the basis of her book The Joy Luck Club and the subsequent movie, she did not grow up in this area; she was born and grew up in Oakland. Notable 1940s basketball player Willie "Woo Woo" Wong, who excelled in local schools, college and professional teams, was born in, and grew up playing basketball in, Chinatown; a local playground bears his name. Actor-martial artist Bruce Lee, who was born at San Francisco Chinese Hospital before moving back to Hong Kong three months later, returned to the United States at the age of eighteen, residing in San Francisco's Chinatown for the first few months before moving to Seattle.

== Transportation ==
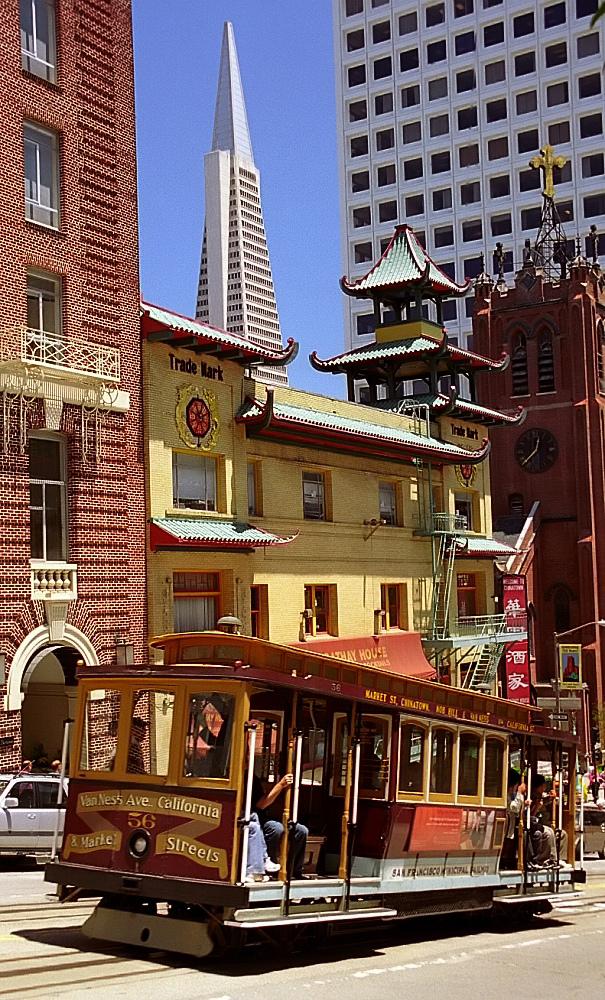
Cable Car 56 ascends Nob Hill from Chinatown along California Street; prominent buildings shown include the Transamerica Pyramid, Sing Chong Bazaar, Hartford Building, and Old Saint Mary's Cathedral.

San Francisco cable cars have long served areas of Chinatown; the modern system serves the southern (along California Street) and western (along Powell Street) sections of the neighborhood.

The Stockton Street Tunnel was completed in 1914 and brought San Francisco Municipal Railway Streetcar service to Stockton Street. After the tracks were removed, the overhead wires were maintained and buses replaced streetcars along the route. The 30 Stockton and 45 Union/Stockton are among the most heavily ridden lines in the system. Modern rail service has returned in the form of Chinatown station upon the completion of the Muni Metro's Central Subway.

The Broadway Tunnel was completed in 1952 and was intended to serve as a connection between the Embarcadero Freeway and the Central Freeway. These plans did not materialize due to the highway revolts at the time. The tunnel currently serves to connect Chinatown with Russian Hill and Van Ness Avenue to the west.

In the 1980s, Chinatown merchants were opposed to the removal of the Embarcadero Freeway, but these objections were overturned after it was damaged in the 1989 Loma Prieta earthquake. According to the San Francisco Chronicle, activist Rose Pak then "almost single-handedly persuaded the city to build" the $1.5 billion Central Subway project to compensate Chinatown for the demolition of the freeway.

The 49-Mile Scenic Drive is routed through Chinatown, with particular attention paid to the corner of Grant and Clay.

On October 20, 2022, Chinatown station was first shown to the public after years of development, with promises of completion of the station sometime in January. It opened with a soft launch as part of a shuttle service on November 12, 2022, introducing two new metro stations downtown before officially being connected to the T Third Street line on January 7, 2023.

== See also ==
- Kong Chow Temple, Corner of Stockton and Clay
- Chinatowns in the United States
- History of the Chinese Americans in San Francisco
- Showgirl Magic Museum
