= Norman Fong =

Chinese-American activist and minister

Norman Fong is an American community activist, Presbyterian minister, and musician from San Francisco's Chinatown. He served as Executive Director of the Chinatown Community Development Center (CCDC) from 2011 until his retirement in April 2020. A third-generation Chinatown resident, Fong is known for his work in affordable housing development, youth leadership programs, and Asian American civil rights advocacy. He is also a member of the dance band Jest Jammin'.

== Early life ==
Norman Fong was born in San Francisco's Chinatown and grew up in the neighborhood during the 1950s and 1960s, a period in which racial segregation limited the schools and hospitals available to Chinese residents. He was the third generation of his family to live in Chinatown; his mother was born in the neighborhood in 1919, and his father immigrated to the United States through Angel Island during the era of the Chinese Exclusion Act. As a teenager, Fong's family received an eviction notice from their family home, after which the youth program at Donaldina Cameron House helped relocate the family, an experience Fong has credited as the beginning of his lifelong commitment to housing activism.

== Education ==
Fong attended San Francisco public schools, including what is now Gordon Lau Elementary School (formerly Commodore Stockton Elementary), Francisco Middle School, and Galileo High School. He earned a bachelor's degree from San Francisco State University. That same year, Fong enrolled at Princeton Theological Seminary, where he chaired the Social Action Committee and studied liberation theology. Because Asian Americans were not classified as a minority group eligible for many grants at the time, Fong worked three jobs—at a kitchen, a detention hall, and a church—to support himself during seminary. He completed his Master of Divinity at the San Francisco Theological Seminary and was ordained as a Presbyterian minister.

== Career ==
=== Early ministry and activism ===
While at Princeton, Fong was recruited by the United Methodist Church as a Human Rights Mission Intern, traveling to Hong Kong and the Philippines to investigate the human rights impact of multinational corporations. He returned to San Francisco in 1979 and joined the Youth Ministries team at Donaldina Cameron House, where he served as Director of Immigrant Youth Ministries and as a pastor at the Presbyterian Church in Chinatown. Following the 1983 verdict in the killing of Vincent Chin, Fong helped organize Asian Americans for Justice (AAJ), modeled after Detroit's American Citizens for Justice, and served as the group's secretary. Members of AAJ later collaborated with Jesse Jackson's Rainbow Coalition.

=== Chinatown Community Development Center ===
Fong joined the Chinatown Community Development Center (CCDC) in 1990 as Deputy Director of Programs, later becoming Executive Director in 2011. Under his leadership, the organization grew its affordable housing portfolio to nearly 3,500 units and doubled its staff size. In 1991, Fong launched the Adopt-an-Alleyway Youth Empowerment Project, a youth-led initiative to clean and revitalize Chinatown's alleyways. The program grew to receive municipal funding and support for drainage, lighting, street cleaning, and plantings throughout the neighborhood. He also founded the Chinatown Alleyway Tours, a youth-led community education program. Fong served as an emcee of the Chinese New Year Community Street Fair in Chinatown before stepping down in 2015. He also helped found a "Noodle Fest" with San Francisco Supervisor Aaron Peskin and the Italian American community to ease tensions between Chinatown and neighboring North Beach. Fong announced his retirement from CCDC in February 2020, effective April 9, 2020, and was succeeded by Deputy Director Malcolm Yeung. Following the rise in anti-Asian violence during the COVID-19 pandemic, Fong returned to the organization on a part-time basis.

== Recognition ==
In 2013, President Barack Obama named Fong a White House Champion of Change for Community Resilience and Preparedness. He received the Distinguished Alumni Award from the San Francisco Theological Seminary in 2018 and the Distinguished Alumni Award from San Francisco State University in 2019.

== Personal life ==
Fong is an ordained minister with the Presbyterian Church (USA) and serves as a parish associate at the Presbyterian Church in Chinatown. Both of his older brothers are also pastors, and his sister works at Cameron House. He is a longtime member of the dance band Jest Jammin'.
