= Ng Poon Chew =

American journalist

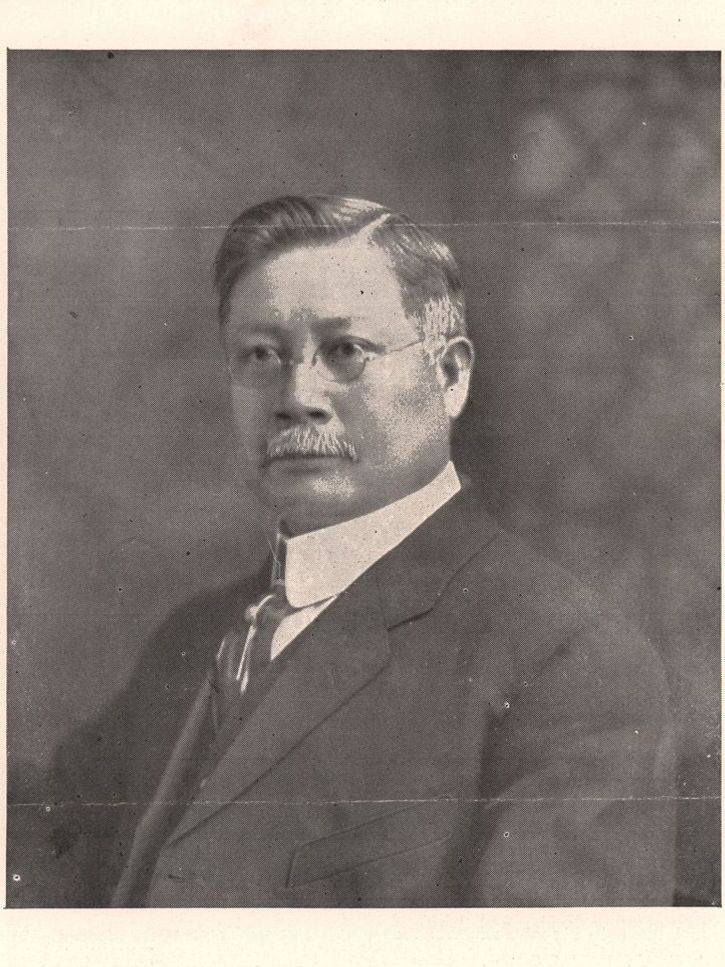
Chew c. 1920

Ng Poon Chew (Chinese: 伍盤照; pinyin: Wǔ Pánzhào; Jyutping: Ng5 Pun4ziu3, March 14, 1866 – March 13, 1931) was an author, publisher, and advocate for Chinese American civil rights. He published the first Chinese-language daily newspaper to be printed outside of China. He later became an influential orator and journalist after publishing the newspaper.

== Early life ==
Chew was born in the Toisan district of Guangdong province in Southern China in 1866. He lived with his grandmother and assisted a Taoist priest. When he was thirteen, Chew journeyed to the United States, along with his cousin. He moved to California in 1881, where he first worked as a domestic servant (a houseboy) on a ranch in San Jose. While working on the ranch in San Jose, he learned English and Christian teachings. Growing up, he often encountered harassment, anti-Chinese violence, arson, and murders as white workers reacted brutally to the Chinese living in the West Coast. In the face of this prejudice, Chew adopted Western-style clothing and cut off his long braid. He also converted to Christianity.

Mary S. Carey, a recent widow, was his first teacher at a mission school in San Jose. Carey, along with other teachers, also faced harassment for providing education to Chinese immigrants. The mission school, along with most of the Chinese quarter in San Jose, was burnt in 1887 by white arsonists.

After this, Chew moved to San Francisco to continue his education. Because the Chinese were banned from attending public schools (until the ruling of Tape v. Hurley), Chew's only options were to attend segregated schools or the missionaries’ programs. Chew joined a missionary program to improve his English and studied the Bible. Afterwards, he enrolled in the San Francisco Theological Seminary and hoped to join the clergy. In the face of mounting anti-Chinese racism, Chew succeeded in his studies and became the first Chinese graduate from the seminary in 1892. He was later ordained in Chinatown to a crowd of three hundred attendees, and he became the first Chinese Presbyterian Minister on the American West Coast.

Chew was fluent in Cantonese and English, and he married Chun Fah, a woman from the Occidental Board Presbyterian Mission House. Fah served as an interpreter for the Mission and her writing was published annually in the Occidental Board's monthly reports. Chew was assigned to a ministry in Los Angeles, and he and other missionaries preached in Chinese to Southern Californians during Sundays.

== Publishing career ==
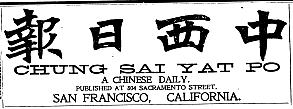
Chung Sai Yat Po's Header

After a fire (attributed most likely to arson) destroyed his mission in 1898, he decided to focus his efforts on establishing a Chinese-language newspaper instead. He learned to operate the press through apprenticing himself to a Japanese-language periodical in Los Angeles. Chew published his Los Angeles-based weekly, Hua Mei Sun Bo, for a year. The support that his newspaper received persuaded him to move back to San Francisco and continue advocating for Chinese immigrants in the “capital” of Chinese America. There, he founded the first Chinese-language daily outside of China: Chung Sai Yat Pao (Chinese-Western Daily). His newspaper generally promoted an assimilationist viewpoint, encouraging Chinese American readers to adapt to North American values. Chew's newspaper also became the principal advocate for Chinese American rights in the United States.

By 1902, Chew's newspaper's influence grew and was the largest out of San Francisco's four Chinese-language newspapers. The Chung Sai Yat Po had more than 3,000 readers out of the 10,000 Chinese residents in Chinatown. In addition to supporting Chinese rights in general, Chew's paper also specifically advocated for Chinese American women's rights. His newspaper was particularly useful for the Chinese community in San Francisco during the plague outbreak of 1900–1904.

In 1905, Chew, along with Patrick J. Healy, an Irish American journalist, published A Statement for Non-exclusion in 1905. This book demonstrated the anger that immigrants felt from being denied entry to the United States and the difficulties they faced in claiming rights. American-born Chinese were often prevented from citizenship during this period. He published books and pamphlets opposing discrimination against Chinese Americans.

== Chinese American Rights Advocator and Orator ==
A pamphlet that accompanied Chew's lecture at the Redpath Chautauqua.

During that same year, Chew went on a speaking tour across the country to harness support for the Chinese firms’ economic boycott. Firms were boycotting in protest to the violence that Chinese merchants and nationals were subjected to at American ports upon arrival. He addressed the United States House of Representatives in Congress, as well as President Theodore Roosevelt. Chew was able to convince Roosevelt to order the immigration service to stop their harsh treatment towards Chinese travelers. Afterwards, Chew traveled throughout the United States, speaking out against anti-Chinese legislation, such as the Chinese Exclusion Act.

Throughout his life, Chew gave hundreds of public speeches in support for Chinese immigrants and Chinese immigrant women's rights. He spoke alongside Samuel Gompers, Isidor Straus, and Terence V. Powderly at an immigration conference. (However, Gompers and Powderly disagreed with his views and supported the Chinese Exclusion Act, as they hoped to protect white working-class men.)

Chew was adviser to the Chinese consulate general in San Francisco from 1906 to 1913 and vice-consul for China from 1913 until 1931.

In his later years, he was called "an Oriental Mark Twain" and the "Chinese Mark Twain." On March 13, 1931, Chew died shortly before his sixty-fifth birthday of a heart attack.

== See also ==
- King Lan Chew, Ng Poon Chew's youngest daughter, a dancer.
- John P. Irish, supported Chinese immigration. Ng Poon Chew was an honorary pallbearer at his funeral.
- Samantha Knox Condit, Presbyterian missionary in San Francisco. Ng Poon Chew was an assisting pastor at her funeral.
- Donaldina Cameron, a Presbyterian missionary who was the superintendent of the Occidental Board Presbyterian Mission House and a close friend to Chew.
- Although Ng was his given surname, he was referred to as the Reverend Chew, Dr. Chew, and Chew throughout his life.
