= William Speer =

William Speer may refer to:

- William Speer (politician) (1818–1900), Australian politician
- William Speer (minister), American Presbyterian missionary and pastor
- Bill Speer (1942–1989), Canadian ice hockey player
