= Donaldina =

Donaldina may refer to:

- Donaldina Cameron (1869–1968), New Zealand-born American missionary and activist against immigrant slavery
- Donaldina (gastropod), a prehistoric genus of snails
