= Caroline Chew =

Caroline Chew may refer to:

- King Lan Chew, or Caroline Chew, American dancer
- Caroline Chew (equestrian), Singaporean equestrian and solicitor
