= Samantha Knox Condit =

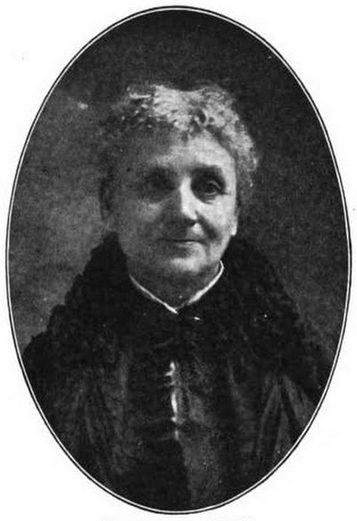
Samantha Knox Condit, from a 1912 publication.

Samantha Knox Condit (August 27, 1837 – August 18, 1912) was an American teacher and Presbyterian missionary, working in the Chinese community of San Francisco, California and surroundings.

== Early life ==
Samantha Davis Knox (known as "Mansie") was born in Hollidays Cove, West Virginia, the daughter of Andrew Knox and Elizabeth Knox. She trained as a teacher at Steubenville Female Seminary in Ohio.

== Career ==
Samantha Knox taught English at the Steubenville Female Seminary for fourteen years after her graduation from the same school. As Mrs. Condit, she worked with her husband as an American Presbyterian missionary in the Chinese community of San Francisco, California from 1872 until she died in 1912. She began and presided over the Occidental Board of Foreign Missions from her own home in its first months. She helped to found a rescue home for Chinese women in San Francisco, later called the Donaldina Cameron House after Donaldina Cameron. In 1888, she attended the General Assembly of the Presbyterian Church in Philadelphia, Pennsylvania, as a delegate representing the Woman's Missionary Society. She organized activities for women and children at the Chinese Presbyterian Church in San Francisco, where her husband was the pastor, and taught Bible classes. "Mrs. Condit has been engaged in the work in the Chinese quarter for the past twenty-six years, and makes a house-to-house visitation each week," explained a 1998 report.

Samantha Knox Condit was also involved in temperance work, as in 1882, when she presented a petition to the mayor of Oakland from the women of the city, demanding that saloons be kept closed on Sundays.

== Personal life ==
Samantha Knox traveled to California in 1871 to stay with her brother William. She married an old friend, the Rev. Ira Miller Condit (1833-1915), in 1872, and helped to raise his children from his first marriage. Samantha Knox Condit died in Oakland, California in 1912, after a long illness, aged 74 years. Ng Poon Chew was one of the pastors assisting at her funeral service.
