= Diana Ming Chan =

- Traditional Chinese: 張陳維明
- Simplified Chinese: 张陈维明
Transcriptions
Standard Mandarin
- Hanyu Pinyin: Zhāng Chén Wéimíng
- Wade–Giles: Chang1 Ch'en2 Wei2-ming2
Yue: Cantonese
- Jyutping: zoeng1 can4 wai4 ming4

Diana Ming Chan (Chinese: 張陳維明; 1929 – August 2008) was an American social worker, philanthropist, advocate, and educator known for her pioneering work in school social work and direct services. She was the first Cantonese-speaking bilingual social worker in San Francisco's Chinatown. She was known for her "dumpling diplomacy", in which politicians were invited to her home to discuss the importance of social workers in public schools over dumplings.

== Early life ==
Chan was born in 1929 in San Francisco, California to a former prostitute. After the Page Act of 1875 prohibited the immigration of nearly all Chinese women and blocked the formation of families within the Chinese American community, Chan's mother came to California for the flourishing sex trade among Chinese Americans. When Chan was 18 months old, her mother died and Chan was sent to an orphanage. Once she was returned to her father, she often spent her evenings in the care of an opium addict. Under such circumstances, Chan did not take her education seriously until the fifth grade when her teacher invited Chan and other students into her home. The newfound interest in biology led Chan to work in a Medical laboratory at San Francisco's Chinese hospital during middle school and high school. As a freshman in college, she worked with low-income students on behalf of YWCA USA at the Settlement house in New York's Bowery.

== Education ==
Chan earned a bachelor's degree in social work at University of California, Berkeley and a master's degree in social work at University of Minnesota.

== Career ==
After she earned her master's degree in social work, she worked with Hispanic, African American, and Chinese adolescents and kids in the Oakland Recreation Department. She worked with young married couples in the YWCA USA in Richmond, California, as well as in low-income housing projects with African Americans.

Chan was the first Chinese social worker at Donaldina Cameron House and continued her work with the organization for 18 years.

Chan taught social work at the City College of San Francisco and the San Francisco State University. In 1970, she taught bilingual workshops for teachers of the San Francisco Unified School District to improve educators' Asian American cultural competency.

In May 2005, Chan was one of two featured individuals in the National Association of Social Workers Foundation's Asian Pacific American (APA) Heritage Month.

In February 2007, Chan helped plan and present a town hall meeting as part of the national project "Eliminating Disparities at End-of-Life."

== Philanthropy ==
In 2000, Chan and her family committed funds to the National Association of Social Workers Foundation's Learning Springboard Endowment, which supports social workers in San Francisco schools.

After Chan's death in 2008, the Asian Pacific Islander Social Work Council, National Association of Social Workers California Chapter, and the National Association of Social Workers Foundation established a scholarship fund called the Diana Ming Chan Bilingual Scholarship in honor of her memory and legacy.

== Advocacy ==
After she became a licensed clinical social worker in San Francisco's Chinatown, Chan advocated for more Chinese bilingual social workers. During the War on Poverty in the 1960s, Chan provided substantial evidence for San Francisco's Chinatown to be considered a "targeted community" and thereby be eligible to receive federal funding for social work programs and services. This funding led to the creation of many organizations including Self-Help for the Elderly, Chinese Newcomers Service Center, Chinatown Child Development Center, and Northeast Mental Health Services. In reaction to the new demand for Chinese American social workers, the City College of San Francisco created a two-year program for social work paraprofessionals.

Chan also lobbied for school social work. She successfully convinced the San Francisco Board of Education to create school positions for social workers.

== Personal life ==
Chan married her first husband, Monfoon Leong, in 1951. They had two children before Leong died in a car accident in Yugoslavia during a family trip in 1964. She later remarried.

Chan also danced in San Francisco's Peking operas.

Chan died in 2008.

== Awards ==
Year	Awards	Organization	Notes
2007	Social Work Pioneer	National Association of Social Workers	
2007	Lifetime Achievement Award	National Association of Social Workers California Chapter	
2007	California Social Work Hall of Distinction	University of Southern California, School of Social Work	
