= Donaldina Cameron House =

Historic building in San Francisco

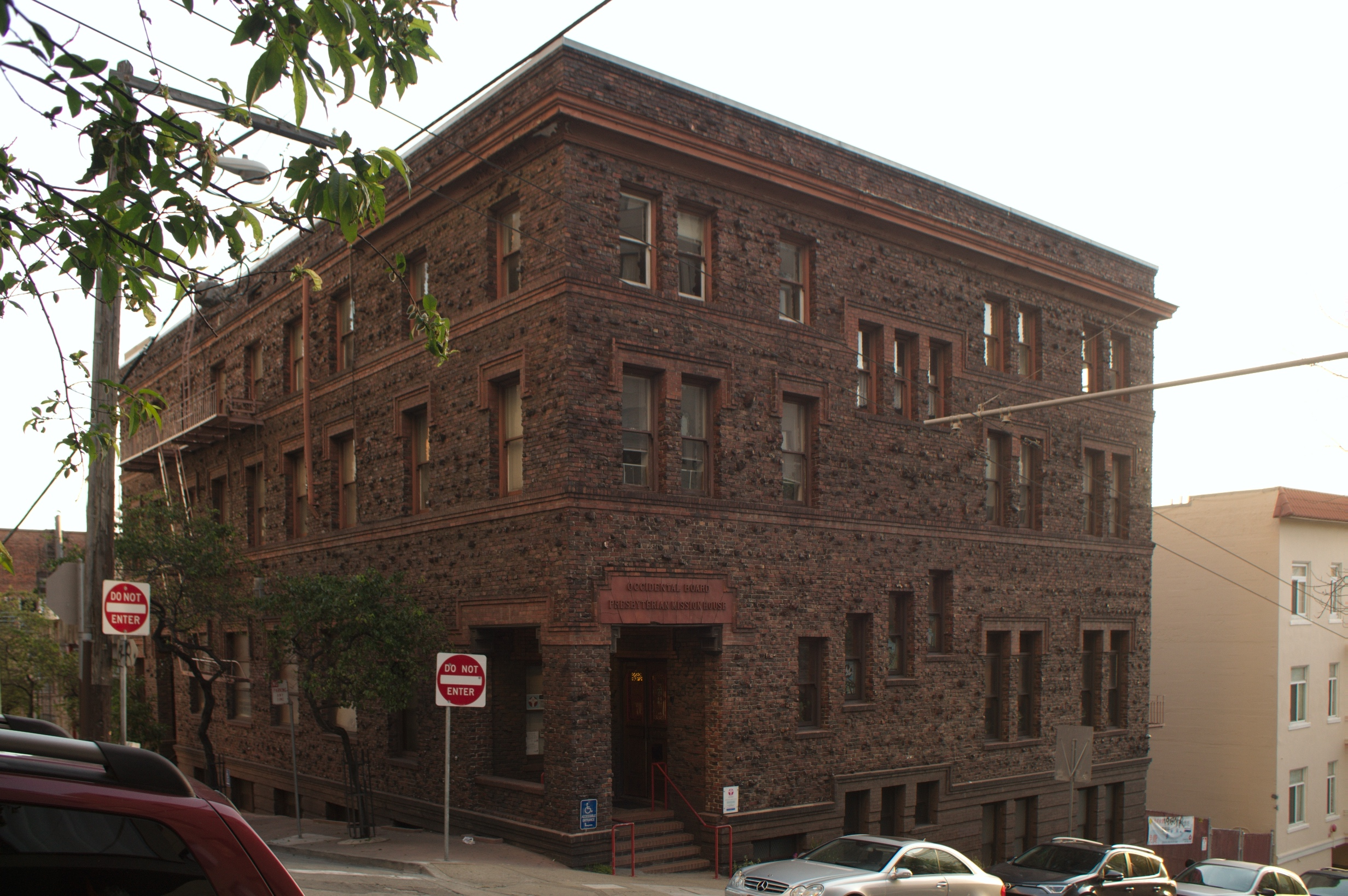

- Location within San Francisco County Location within California
- 37.793262°N 122.408418°W
- Location: 920 Sacramento Street, San Francisco, California, U.S.

History
- Founded: 1876
- Built: 1908

Site notes
- Architect: Julia Morgan

San Francisco Designated Landmark
- Designated: October 10, 1971
- Reference no.: 44

The Donaldina Cameron House, formerly known as the Occidental Board Presbyterian Mission House and Chinese Presbyterian Mission House, is a historic building built in 1908, and located in Chinatown in San Francisco, California. The initial use of the building was as an early 20th-century safe house for Chinese girls and women. Donaldina Cameron, the namesake for the building had served as the house director. Due to the unsettling social history of the building, it is sometimes referred to as a haunted house. The building currently houses the Chinese community nonprofit, Cameron House.

It has been listed as a San Francisco Designated Landmark since October 10, 1971.

== Pre-history ==
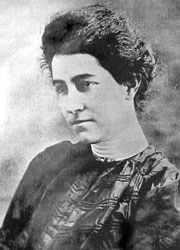
Donaldina Cameron (in 1922)

Many Chinese emigrants came to California during the 1849 Gold Rush, they made up one-fifth of the population in four of the largest mining counties. The Chinese were treated poorly, and they often worked low wage jobs in mines and on railroads. As a result, few Chinese women were able to join their partners in California, and the male Chinese population was disproportionately represented.

The Chinese Exclusion Act of 1882, began further limiting Chinese immigration. The Tongs exploited the situation by creating a human trafficking network and by setting up brothels in Chinatown. The women brought from China were often sold as wives, prostitutes, and household slaves.

In 1873, five women organized the Presbyterian Women's Occidental Board of Foreign Missions. The Occidental Board Presbyterian Mission House building was formed in 1876 in Chinatown in San Francisco, under the leadership of Margaret Culbertson (1834–1897). It was established as a home for Chinese girls that were escaping abusive employment, or prostitution. The first location of the organization was a wooden building located across the street at 933 Sacramento Street.

Donaldina Cameron, joined the Mission House in 1895, where she taught sewing classes and worked alongside Culbertson. Cameron started to serve as the house director starting in 1897, after the death of Culbertson. Tien Fuh Wu worked as Cameron's aide, and Samantha Knox Condit was a teacher at the organization.

During the 1906 San Francisco earthquake and fires, the building was destroyed by the San Francisco Fire Department in hopes of creating a firebreak.

== History ==
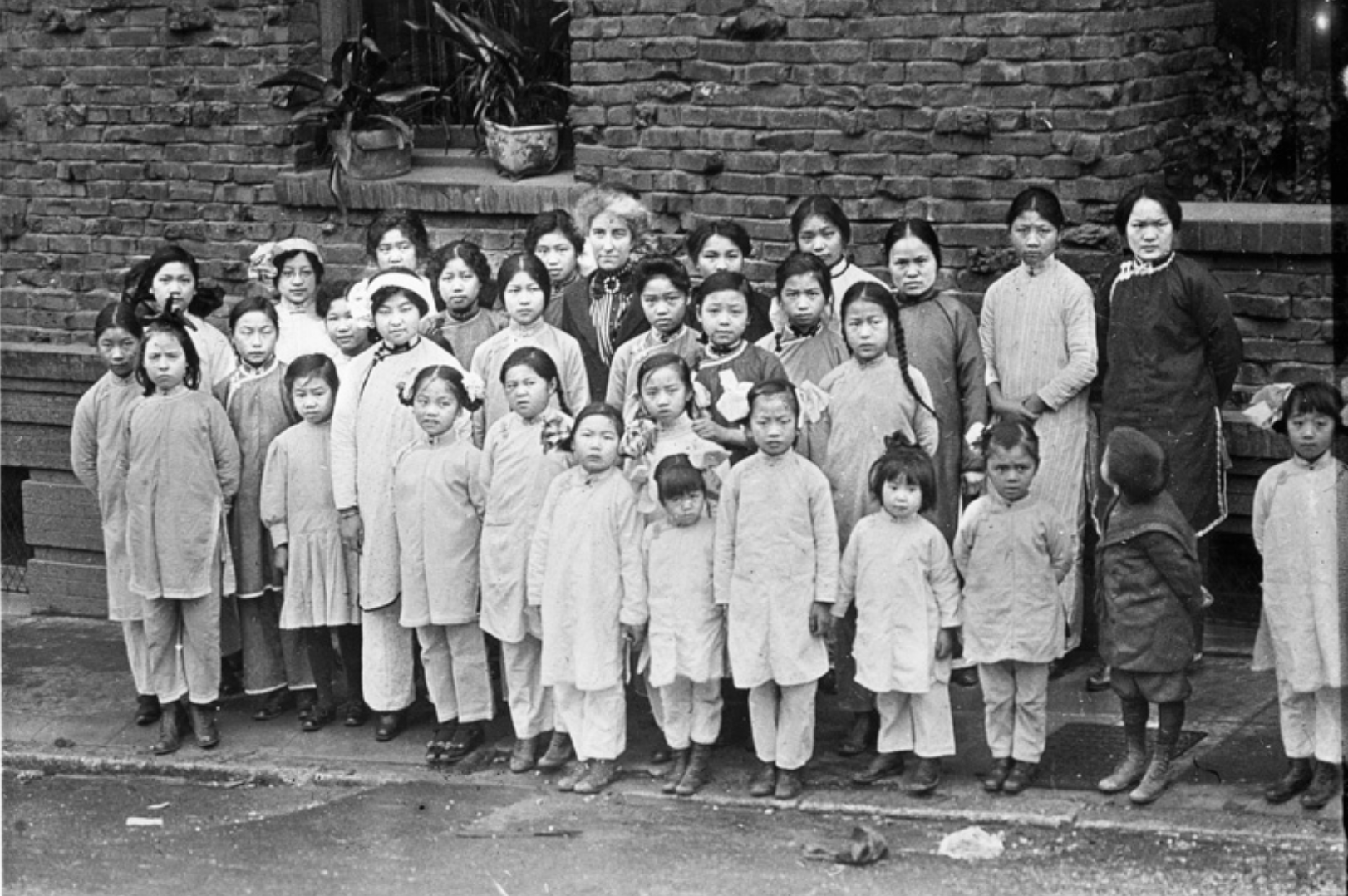
Donaldina Cameron and girls (c. 1915)

The Occidental Board Presbyterian Mission House was rebuilt in 1908 under architect Julia Morgan and moved to 920 Sacramento Street. The new building was built using salvaged clinker bricks. Girls and mui tsai would hide in the basement from their captures.

With the falling numbers of girls being rescued throughout the late-1930s and the Magnuson Act of 1943 (a repeal of the Chinese Exclusion Act), the needs of the community changed. Cameron retired in the late 1930s, and at this point the building was turned into a language school.

Rev. F. S. "Dick" Wichman led the Donaldina Cameron House from 1947 to 1977. Under Wichman, Cameron House expanded their youth programs and created mixed-sex and male classes. Wichman was later accused of sexual abuse and misconduct in the 1990s. Wichman had denied the allegations before his death. Because of the statute of limitations, the San Francisco DA's office never prosecuted. In 2004, the church's "Healing Task Force" released a final investigative report and found Wichman had abused and molested 18 males, including minors from the Cameron House and the Presbyterian Church in Chinatown. The church has made efforts towards collective community healing, which included public acknowledgment of the crimes and an apology.

Diana Ming Chan was the first Chinese social worker at Donaldina Cameron House.

Rev. Harry Chuck led the Donaldina Cameron House starting in 1977. Chuck had also worked for the Chinatown Coalition for Better Housing in the 1970s; and he had documented on film Asian-American activism in the 1960s, which became part of the documentary film "Chinatown Rising" (2020). Harry Chuck, a second-generation American raised in Chinatown, is a prominent Chinese American activist and pastor who fought for civil rights during the late 1900s. He also contributed to Mei Lun Yuen, an affordable housing project for seniors and underprivileged families in the center of Chinatown. Mei Lun Yuen is an affordable housing project for families, especially for seniors.

The Donaldina Cameron House building is considered haunted by some because of its unsettling social history.

== See also ==
- Tong Wars
- Tye Leung Schulze
- List of works by Julia Morgan
- List of San Francisco Designated Landmarks
- American Presbyterian/Reformed Historic Sites Registry
