= Presbyterian Church in Chinatown =

Asian American church in San Francisco, California

Coordinates: 37.7940899°N 122.4082898°W

Presbyterian Church in Chinatown (PCC), established in San Francisco in 1853, is the oldest Chinese American or Asian American church in North America.

== History ==
In 1852, William Speer (1822–1904), a Presbyterian minister from Pennsylvania, who was a missionary to Canton (now Guangzhou) from 1847 until he left in 1850 due to ill health, was sent by the Presbyterian Board of Foreign Missions to work with the rising number of Cantonese Chinese who had come to California after the California Gold Rush. The Presbyterian Chinese Mission held its first meeting on November 6, 1853, with four members.

In 1925, the mission was put under the auspices of the Presbyterian Board of National Missions and renamed the Chinese Presbyterian Church. It was renamed again in 1958 as the Presbyterian Church in Chinatown to better reflect its context in the San Francisco Chinatown community.

== See also ==
- Donaldina Cameron House
