= Tien Fuh Wu =

Chinese American missionary in San Francisco's Chinatown

- Born: Zhejiang
- Died: 1975
- Resting place: Evergreen Cemetery
- Occupation: Missionary

Tien Fuh Wu or Tien Fu Wu (around 1886 – 1975) was a pioneer in the anti-human trafficking movement in San Francisco, California. After being rescued in childhood from her role as a mui tsai (a child servant), she worked for decades to free Chinese immigrant women and girls from sexual slavery and indentured servitude. As the long-time aide to Donaldina Cameron, Wu dedicated her life to helping the residents of the Presbyterian Mission Home, a rescue mission in Chinatown.

== Early life ==
Tien Fuh Wu was born in Zhejiang province of China. She did not know her birthdate, but used January 17 as her birthday as it was the date she was rescued in 1894. Her gravestone gives her birthyear as 1886. Her parents had survived the upheaval of the Taiping Rebellion with enough wealth to practice the tradition of foot binding on their young daughters. As a child, she was sold by her father to pay off his gambling debts to become a mui tsai, a child domestic servant. He locked her in a cabin aboard a boat bound for Shanghai, abandoning her without explanation. She may have been between six and ten years old. In Shanghai, she met a woman who helped her unbind her feet from their tight cloth bindings. She traveled by steamer to San Francisco in 1892, probably as a paper daughter.

Once in San Francisco, Wu was forced to work as a domestic servant at a brothel called the Peking. When the brothel owner fell into debt, Wu was sold to the owner of a gambling den on Jackson Street. She was forced to do household chores while carrying a baby on her back throughout the day. By January 1894, her plight was reported by a neighbor, and workers at the mission home planned a rescue, searching the building along with two police officers. When she was rescued, Wu was covered in burns, cuts, and bruises on her face, head, and arms.

== Childhood and young adulthood at the Presbyterian Mission Home ==
At the Presbyterian Mission Home, Wu's burns and cuts were treated. Along with the other girls at the home, she was protected from the chaotic environment of Chinatown. The girls had bedtime prayers, chores, and time to play, although scarce funds meant they did not have store-bought toys or enough nourishing food. Wu called her childhood at the home as "carefree" and described creating a makeshift jump rope and swing in the basement. She attended the mission's school and learned to read and write Chinese and English.

Donaldina Cameron came to the home in 1895 and would become Superintendent just two years later. Cameron was a strict teacher and initially Wu rebelled against her, but eventually they would grow close, with Wu calling Cameron "Lo Mo," meaning "Old Mother," and Cameron calling her ward "Blessed Tien." Cameron's work required translators and assistants to help her run the home, who were often girls that had grown up there. After Cameron's favorite aide, Leung Yuen Qui, died from tuberculosis, Wu offered to take on the job, making $5 month.

Wu would work to further her education, with scholarships sponsored by a member of a Presbyterian church where Cameron had spoken about her work. In 1909, she received a diploma from the Stevens School, an elite boarding school in Philadelphia, and she went on to study an additional two years at Toronto Bible College. After her formal education ended, she decided to continue working at the mission home, returning to San Francisco in June 1911.

== Work at the Presbyterian Mission Home ==
While most attention has been focused on Cameron, her work was made possible by Wu (her "right-hand woman") and other aides. Wu communicated with trafficked women in Cantonese and advocated for them in court. She accompanied Cameron on dangerous rescues. While rumors about the "white devils" caused Chinese immigrants to fear going with rescuers, Wu could point to her own scars as proof that the girls and women should trust her.

Wu worked with Cameron for decades, dedicating her life to saving women and girls. Between 2,000 and 3,000 residents passed through the Presbyterian Mission Home from its opening in 1874 through the mid-1930s. The rescue mission workers received violent threats from brothel owners, but Wu was especially targeted, because she was perceived as a traitor. Wu received taunts and threatening letters railing against her for cooperating with whites against her own people. Wu took on more responsibility at the home in the 1930s, making public appearances to raise funds and guarding women who had testified against human traffickers. She also vetted potential husbands for the young women in her care, ensuring the men were Christian, had jobs, and would treat the women well. As for herself, she turned down multiple suitors, joking that "men are very useful when it comes to moving furniture."

When Cameron retired in 1934, she hoped Wu would take her place, but Wu declined, saying she didn't have the expertise, and that "an American" should take the position, as she would face prejudice as a Chinese woman. Wu retired in 1951 and moved to Palo Alto to live in the cottage next to Cameron's house. After her death, Cameron left the cottage to Wu, which allowed her financial security. Wu died in 1975, and was buried next to Cameron at the Evergreen Cemetery in Los Angeles.
