= William Speer (minister) =

American Presbyterian missionary and author (1822–1904)

Rev. Dr. William Speer
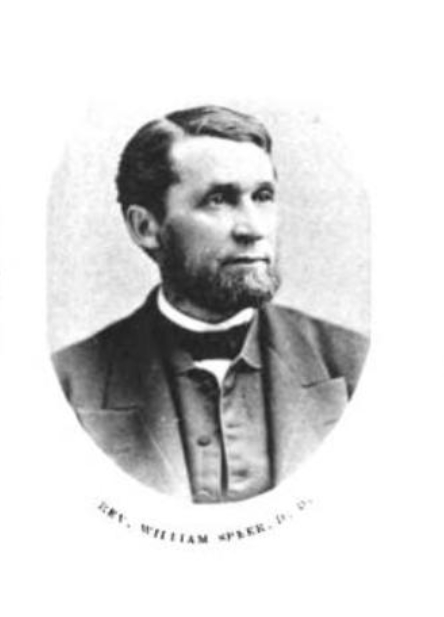
- Photo from "History of the Presbytery of Washington (Pennsylvania)", Philadelphia (1889) p.70
- Born: April 24, 1822; New Alexandria, Westmoreland County, Pennsylvania, US
- Died: February 16, 1904 (aged 81); Washington, Washington County, Pennsylvania, US

William Speer (1822–1904) was an American pioneer Presbyterian missionary and author. He was initially a medical missionary to the Chinese in Canton (1847–1850), where he helped establish the first Presbytery in Canton. He was then sent to minister to the Chinese in San Francisco (1852–1857), where he founded the first Chinese Protestant church outside of China and became a strong advocate for the Chinese in California. Later (1865–1876) he served in Pennsylvania as the Secretary of the Presbyterian Board of Education.

== Missionary to the Chinese in Canton ==
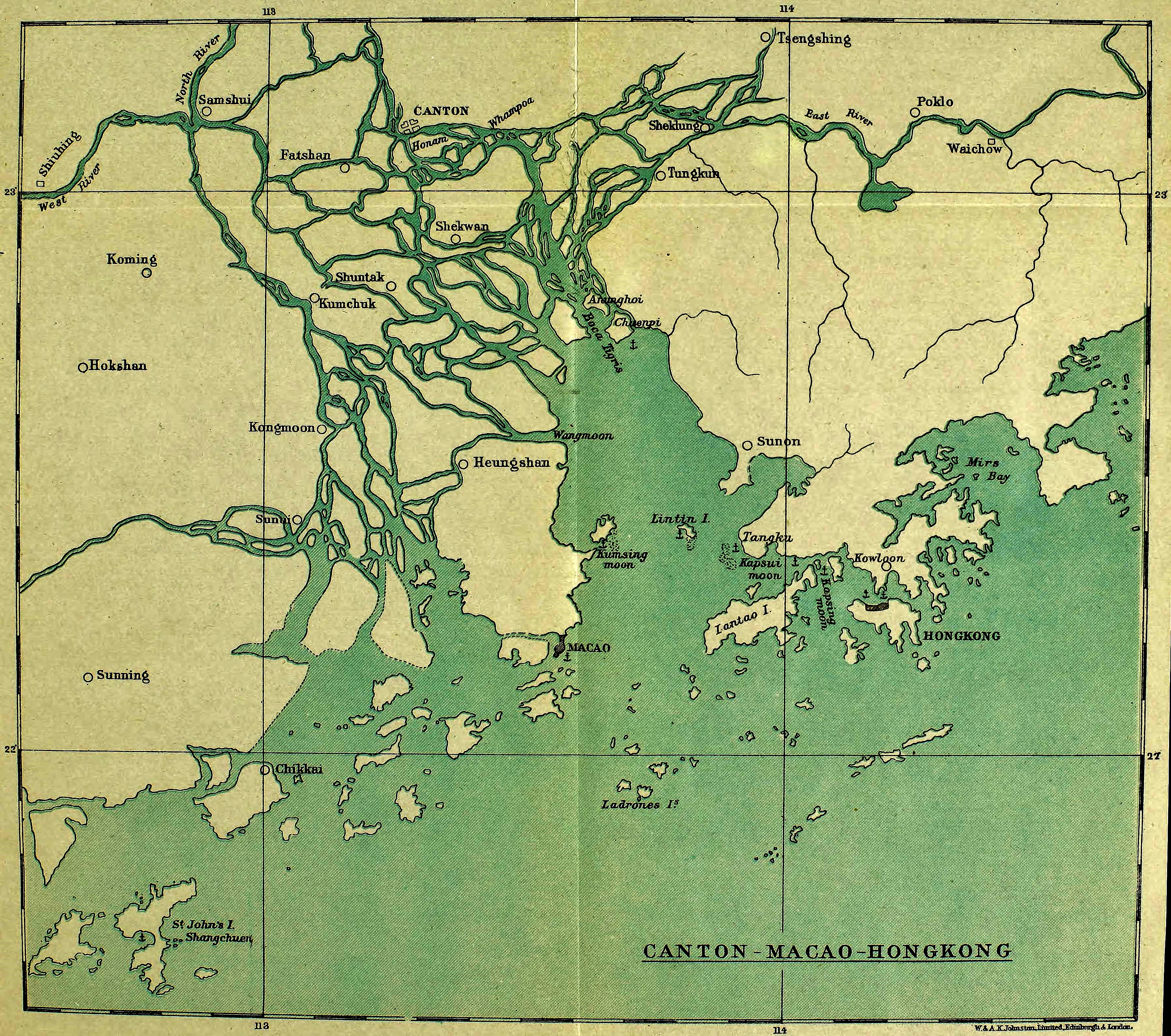
Speer sailed to Macao (December 1846), moved on to Canton (Spring 1847), and sailed back to New York (1850). Almost all the Chinese he ministered to in California (1852-1857) emigrated from the Pearl River Delta districts west of Canton and Macao.

After three years of medical studies and after being licensed to preach in 1846, Speer was sent by the Presbyterian Board of Foreign Missions as a medical missionary to establish a mission in Canton (now Guangzhou) in the Pearl River Delta in southern China, where he served from the end of 1846 to the end of 1849. Describing his new surroundings in the Pearl River Delta, he later wrote: "Towns embowered in bamboo, a species of banyan and other trees meet the eye on every hand. The level portion of the soil is cultivated as only the Chinese know how to do in order to obtain the utmost possible returns from Nature. The view appears like a great garden bounded by ranges of hills. The narrow streets of the towns are densely crowded with men following every trade and means of procuring a subsistence which the necessities of human nature can suggest."

Learning the Cantonese language, Speer (phoneticized in Cantonese: 施比爾) worked alongside Dr. Peter Parker at the Canton Hospital. He also helped organize the first Presbytery in Canton in February 1849, which he commemorated 50 years later. Due to ill health, he departed Canton and sailed to the U.S. in 1850.

== Minister to the Chinese in California ==
Speer was sent in 1852 by the Presbyterian Board of Missions to San Francisco, California to minister to the Chinese immigrants there. He was fluent in Cantonese and knew the Chinese culture well. In January 1853, through an article in The Princeton Review, he advanced the thesis that, not only should emigrant Chinese be welcomed in California, but also their presence is providential "provision for the necessities" of the vast unimproved West, from agriculture to fisheries, from infrastructure to mining, which would "in time advance California to an equality with the proudest portions of our land".

Beginning February 1853, he leased and used the second floor of a store front as a temporary chapel, where he preached regularly in Cantonese to a group of thirty or so. To raise awareness of and money for his ministry, he gave lectures in English on Chinese culture, from Confucius at the Mercantile Library to Chinese Farmer at the agricultural fair, all of which attracted much attention from the non-Chinese public. As Speer continued to speak in sermons and lectures, defending the Chinese and explaining their culture and civilization, he reported in 1853 that some Chinese asked him to be their "chief in this country", to act on their behalf, to shield them from acts of injury or plunder.

On November 6, 1853, he held the first church meeting for the Chinese, in which he preached in Cantonese followed by a brief English version for the assembled congregation at the First Presbyterian Church. In so doing, together with four Chinese church members (Atsun, Lai Sam, A-tsen, and Hi Cheong Kow), Speer founded the first Chinese Protestant church outside of China—the Chinese Mission Chapel in 1853, now the Presbyterian Church in Chinatown.

The brick Chinese Chapel building, two stories plus basement at the northeast corner of Stockton and Sacramento Streets in San Francisco's Chinatown, was erected for $18,000, which was largely raised from San Franciscans of all denominations. It was dedicated June 1854. In the basement Speer started an evening English Mission-school. For the Chinese immigrants who suffered illnesses from the long voyage to San Francisco, Speer opened a dispensary in the basement, at which Dr. Ayres, Dr. Coon and Dr. Downer gave gratuitous services. On the main level, he held two Sunday services and a Wednesday evening prayer meeting, as well as distributing tracts. In August 1854, there were 40 or more in the services and 17 pupils in the evening English Mission-school. Later, he revealed that one of his enterprising Chinese students in the Mission-school built a small working model locomotive pulling model cars and ran them around a little track in Sacramento -- the first model railroad on the Pacific coast. In 1855, Speer moved his residence into the upper level of the chapel building.

In January 1855, as founder and editor, Speer published the first English/Chinese newspaper, The Oriental (東涯新錄 traditional; 东涯新录 simplified), which had a circulation of 20,000 copies the first year and was the second Chinese-language newspaper in North America. In the inaugural issue, he made the prophetic observation that the Chinese, who were hard working with experience building large projects, would become builders of the proposed transcontinental railroad across the United States.

"the boundless plateaus of the Western half of this continent ... will be scattered with busy lines of Chinese builders of iron roads, that shall link the two oceans, and add to the wealth and comforts of the dwellers upon either shore." - William Speer (January 4, 1855)

After the California Supreme Court ruled in December 1854 that the Chinese had no rights to testify against whites, Speer responded in the 18 January 1855 issue, "The principles of the Magna Carta, the prerogatives of juries, the rights of judges and advocates, Republicanism and Christianity, and common humanity are all outraged by this iniquitous decision of the Supreme Court of California".

In the 25 January 1855 issue, Speer provided an overview of the misunderstood Chinese Companies, with detailed table of the number of members in each of then five Chinese Companies. Two months later, he provided an English translation of the by-laws of the Yeung-Wo Company, in an attempt "to hush the groundless claims about the importation of coolies, their working the mines for the benefit of wealthy capitalists,...".

In the 8 February 1855 issue, Speer pointed out that Chinese living in the Pearl River Delta "were better acquainted with other countries than any other portion of the Chinese. ... When the news of the discovery of gold ... reached them, it was natural that they, above all other Chinese, should rush to California." Speer's insight regarding 19th-century Chinese emigration is supported by the modern research of historian Yong Chen.

The Oriental ceased publication after about two years; upon its discontinuance in December 1856, Ze Too Yune (司徒源) took up the mantle and founded the Chinese Daily News in Sacramento. According to biographer W. C. Covert, Speer's bilingual newsletter "did much to soften the racial antipathy that made the life for the Chinese almost intolerable." Historian Kevin Starr stated that "As editor of The Oriental, Speer broke his health campaigning against oppression of the Chinese".

Speer was an early advocate of fair treatment for Chinese immigrants in California. Historian M. L. Stahler called him the "champion of California's Chinese". According to historian R. Seager, Rev. Speer was "the first champion of the persecuted Chinese in America". Historian K. Starr saw him as "a lonely champion", who "could not offset the tale of exploitation, exclusion, disenfranchisement, and murder, which characterized the Chinese experience in California."

In an 1856 pamphlet directed to the California legislature, Speer argued against the tide of anti-Chinese legislation, from the foreign miners' tax to the head tax. Using statistical evidence, he pointed to the benefits of Chinese immigration to the state treasury, that it was in the state's interests "to 'forbid a policy calculated to exclude or debase Chinese immigration'." The foreign miners' tax was reduced and Speer was commended by General Assembly of the Presbyterian Church.

Statesman William H. Seward, then a U.S. Senator, applauded Speer saying, "accept assurances of the sincere respect with which you have inspired me by your resolute assertion of the principles of human freedom and political justice."

Speer protested discrimination against the Chinese, lobbied on their behalf in Sacramento, and published in 1857 a pamphlet to the California legislature: An answer to the common objections to Chinese testimony: and an earnest appeal to the Legislature of California, for their protection by our law. His activities established precedents for those clergy who came after him; they also defended the Chinese from harassment and discrimination.

With his health failing, Speer delivered a farewell address in July 1857 and departed California. Two years later, in September 1859, Rev. A. W. Loomis arrived to resume the mission work Speer started in San Francisco. According to historian J. Yung, when the school Speer founded in the Chinese Mission basement in 1853 started to receive public funds in 1859, it became the first public school in the United States for Chinese students. Following Speer's precedents, others established schools for the Chinese, not only in San Francisco, but also in Oakland, Sacramento, Stockton, and other California communities.

== Secretary of the Presbyterian Board of Education ==
From January 1866 to July 1876, Speer was back in his home state Pennsylvania serving as the Corresponding Secretary of the Presbyterian Board of Education. In 1866 he was conferred the D.D. degree.

In a note introducing his article Democracy of the Chinese in the November 1868 Harper's Magazine, the editors wrote: "We believe that there are not five men, European or American, who are as thoroughly acquainted as Dr. Speer with the Chinese in their own country. We think there is no other man so fully conversant with the Chinese in California."

In September 1869, Speer journeyed to the West coast overland, via the newly completed transcontinental railroad, visiting the State agricultural fair in Sacramento on his way to resume work, along with his successor, Rev. Loomis, campaigning on behalf of the Chinese on the coast. Before returning in October to the East, he addressed the joint synods of California, as one from the old school Presbyterian Board of Education, noting that the time had come for the establishment of a theological seminary in California for the ministerial needs of the West and not rely on the seminaries in the East. Two years later, Rev. W. A. Scott, who had helped Speer dedicate the Chinese Chapel in 1854, founded the San Francisco Theological Seminary.

"The Chinese upon our Pacific coast have proved themselves admirable miners. When the hostility of white foreigners has driven them out of the better mining regions, ... they have still toiled patiently and diligently. ... Thus districts which had been almost abandoned have revived and all classes of the population been directly benefited." --William Speer (1870)

In 1870, Speer published a book, The Oldest and the Newest Empire: China and the United States. An early look at China from an American perspective, the book placed China's long history side by side with the history of trade with Europe and the United States, and Chinese immigration to the United States. Notably, it touted the "glory of America" and an embrace of Christianity as the path for the future of China. Unlike many Americans of his era, Speer saw Chinese immigration as a positive good for both nations. This social vision drew from his faith and aspirations that Chinese immigrants would bring Christianity back to China.

He published another book, The Great Revival of 1800, in 1872.

== Personal life ==
William Speer was born April 24, 1822, in New Alexandria, Pennsylvania, the first of seven children, to Dr. James Ramsey and Hetty (Morrow) Speer. He was the grandson of the Rev. William and Sarah (Ramsey) Speer and of Paul and Hettie (Guthrie) Morrow. His father was a surgeon and the first ophthalmologist in Pittsburgh, Pennsylvania. His paternal grandfather and namesake, Rev. William Speer 1764–1829, was a Presbyterian minister at Greensburg, Pennsylvania; the first chaplain at the seat of the new government of the Northwest Territory, Chillicothe, Ohio; and uncle of President James Buchanan.

After growing up in Pittsburgh and after attending nearby Jefferson College for a short time, William Speer left Pennsylvania for Kenyon College in Ohio, where he graduated in 1840 at age 18. He then studied medicine under his father for three years, and in 1843 at age 21 he was elected resident physician at Wills Hospital in Philadelphia. Heeding a call to the ministry, he studied theology at the Allegheny Seminary and was licensed to preach on April 21, 1846, just a few days shy of his 24th birthday.

He married Cornelia Brackenridge from Allegheny, Pennsylvania, on May 7, 1846. Although he had three other ministry opportunities, they heeded the call to China from the Presbyterian Board of Foreign Missions and sailed from New York on July 20, 1846, to the Pearl River Delta in southern China. En route, Cornelia Speer suffered hemorrhages from the lungs; they landed at Macao on December 26, 1846. After losing his wife and baby in Macao in 1847 and after learning the language (Cantonese) and laboring under adverse conditions in Canton, William Speer was beset with disorders of the liver and digestive organs and was sent back, courtesy of Captain Abbott of the Carrington, arriving in New York on March 29, 1850.

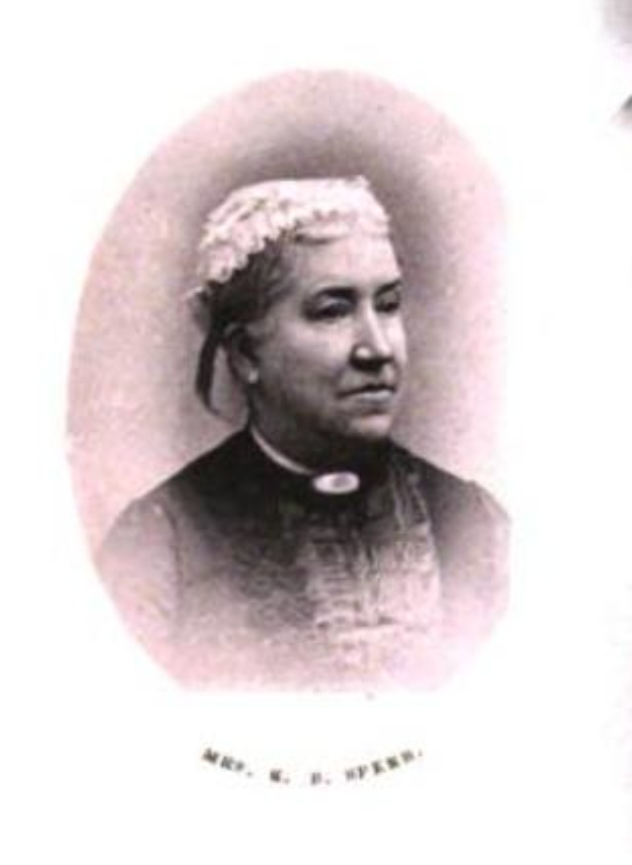
Mrs. Elizabeth B. Speer (1827-1921). Photo from "History of the Presbytery of Washington (Pennsylvania)", Philadelphia (1889) p. 194

Back in western Pennsylvania as an agent of the Board of Education, Speer regained his health and married Elizabeth Breading Ewing from Washington, Pennsylvania on April 20, 1852. On October 5, 1852, he and his wife sailed from New York to Panama, crossing the Isthmus by rail, boat, and mule pack; they arrived in San Francisco on November 6, 1852.

In San Francisco, they had three children. Exhausted from campaigning against oppression of the Chinese all day and often much of the night, Speer sought rest in Mariposa visiting Rev. W. A. Scott (October 1955) and then in Hawaii (April–September 1856), a longer stay where he preached in Cantonese to the Chinese there. In summer 1857 he and his young family left California for a furlough in the East, hoping to return and resume his work; but after more than a year, he resigned from California, compelled by the progress of disease in his lungs, which he ascribed "to error and imprudence in overtaxing bodily strength".

In the Midwest, two children born to Rev. William and Elizabeth in 1860 and 1863 died in 1863. Their last child, Breading Speer, was born in 1865 in Minnesota.
