= Donaldina Cameron =

New Zealand–American missionary (1869–1968)

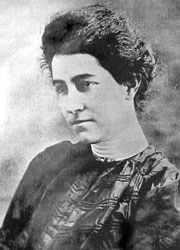
- Cameron in 1922
- Born: July 26, 1869; New Zealand
- Died: January 4, 1968 (aged 98); Palo Alto, California, U.S.
- Other names: Fahn Quai, Lo Mo, Angry Angel of Chinatown, White Devil
- Occupation: Presbyterian missionary

Donaldina Cameron (July 26, 1869 – January 4, 1968) was a New Zealand–born American Presbyterian missionary who was a pioneer in the fight against slavery in San Francisco's Chinatown, who helped more than 2,000 Chinese immigrant girls and women escape from forced prostitution or indentured servitude. She was known as "Fahn Quai" or the "White Devil" of Chinatown, as well as the "Angry Angel of Chinatown" and "Lo Mo".

== Early life (1869–1900) ==
The youngest of seven children, Donaldina was born into a Scottish family that lived on a sheep farm in New Zealand. She moved with her family to California when she was three and a half. During her childhood, she had very little contact and experience with immigrant populations while living on a large sheep ranch in the San Gabriel Valley.

Family friend Evelyn Browne, the former president of the Occidental Board of Foreign Missions, took Cameron to the Presbyterian Home in San Francisco, in an effort to expose Donaldina to the world around her. At the home, Donaldina met Margaret Culbertson and, in 1895, she became a sewing teacher there. Culbertson and the Presbyterian Home acted as a place of refuge for women forced into sex slavery and freed indentured female Chinese servants, where they could be safe from the outside world and get an education. Together, Culbertson and Cameron worked to rescue Chinese immigrants until Culbertson's death in 1897.

== Background ==
The Chinese Exclusion Act of 1882 was the first piece of federal immigrant legislation in the United States. It prohibited immigrants from any area considered "undesirable", which included most of Asia. It also barred Chinese women from entering the United States, unless they were already married to men in the United States. Originally passed to prohibit the sex trafficking of East Asian women and an influx of East Asian male laborers, it instead created a dangerous and illegal system where young women would present forged papers that said they were already members of Chinese families in the United States. This phenomenon was dubbed the "paper daughters". The women, often referred to as mui tsais, were sold as domestic servants or forced prostitutes by the tongs (criminal societies). These women lived brutal lives, usually dying within five years. During this time San Francisco City Hall, run by Abe Ruef and Eugene Schmitz, took kickbacks from the tongs, resulting in very little government action against this problem. The Chinese Six Companies was a Chinese organization that attempted to stop the tongs, but eventually collapsed when the Chinese Tong (slavery leaders) infiltrated the organization.

== Mission life (1900–1934) ==
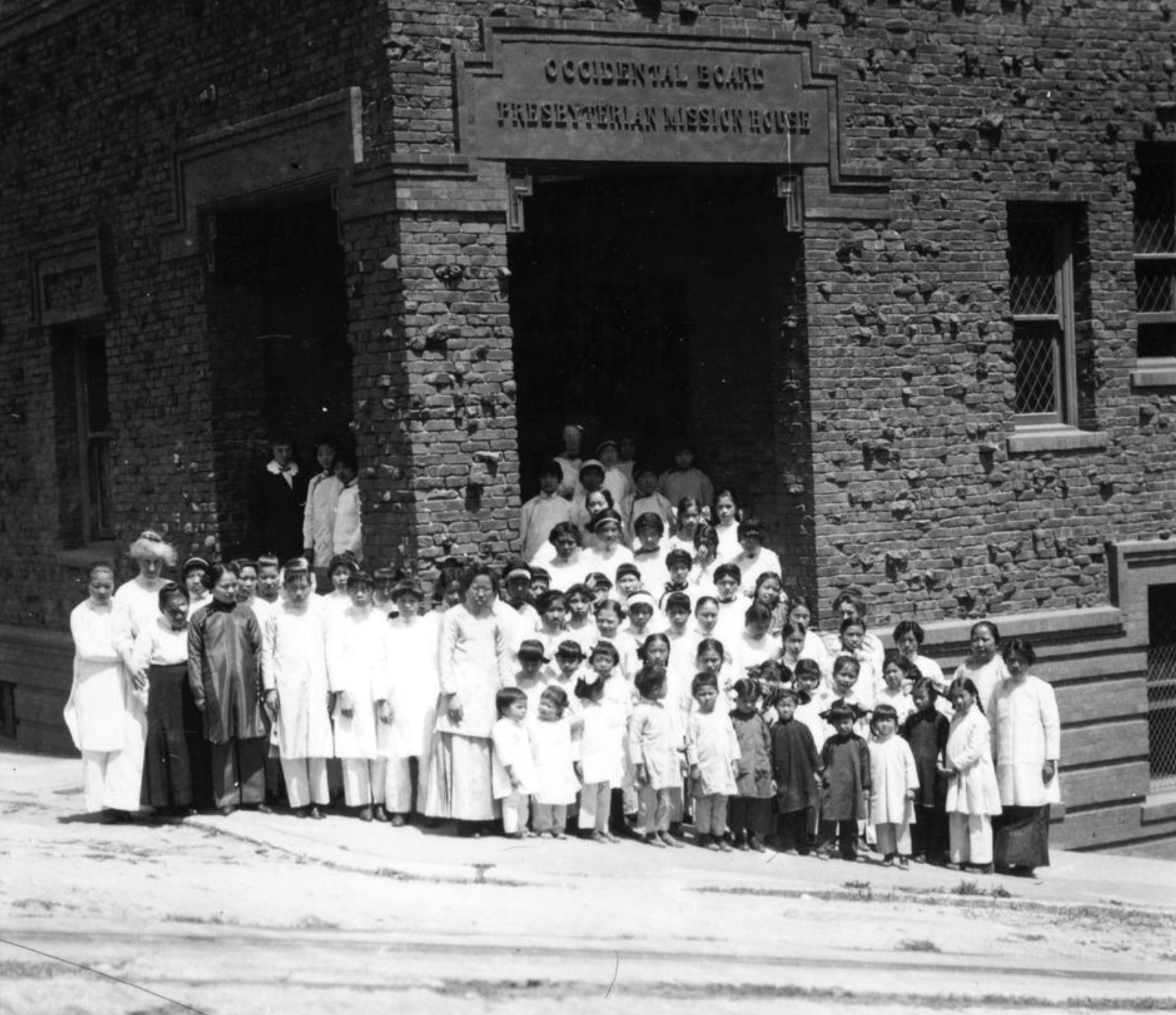
Donaldina Cameron, group of children (1908) at the Occidental Board Presbyterian Mission House

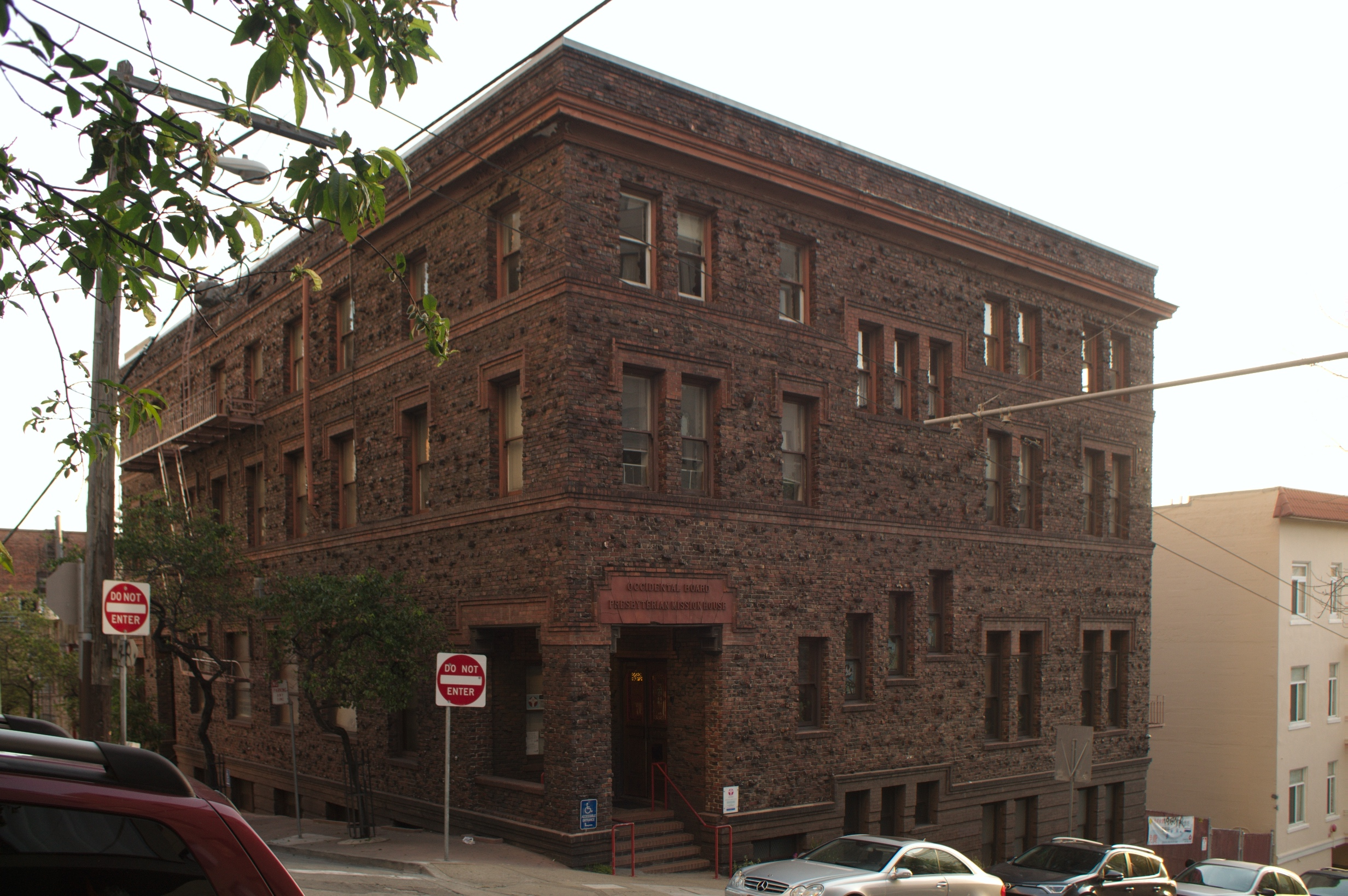
Occidental Board Presbyterian Mission House, renamed the Donaldina Cameron House in 1942, at 920 Sacramento (2018)

Two years after Culbertson's death in 1897, Cameron became superintendent of the Presbyterian Home at the age of 27. She continued the mission of the Home, saving young Chinese immigrant women from sex slavery and indentured service. Contemporary sources referred to this work as "the only foreign mission enterprise ever carried on in the United States".

Friends and relatives of these girls would leave clandestine messages for Donaldina at the Presbyterian Home, indicating the house where a girl was held captive. Often, criminal tong members, who nicknamed her "Jesus Woman" and the "White Devil", would threaten Cameron and the home. She once spent a night in a San Jose jail while seeking the release of a Chinese woman. However, Cameron continued her mission. She was sometimes called "Fahn Quai" (Chinese: 番鬼; Jyutping: fan quai), translated variously as "White Spirit", "White Witch", or "White Devil"—a sensational racial epithet that newspaper and magazine reporters helped spread. She was also dubbed the "Angry Angel of Chinatown", which would later become the title for a biography.

Once freed, Chinese women were forced to reside at the Presbyterian Home (where they were not allowed outside without an escort) and to convert to Christianity. While some Chinese immigrant women welcomed conversion and saw Donaldina as a savior, nicknaming her "Lo Mo" (Chinese: 老母; Jyutping: lou5 mou2) (which she translated as " loyal mother"), and others had mixed feelings about this forced conversion.

In April 1906, the great San Francisco earthquake and fire forced the evacuation of the Presbyterian Home. Cameron returned the night of the earthquake through the blazing city to retrieve a logbook that detailed her guardianship over the girls at the home, thus ensuring their safety from being forced back into servitude or prostitution. The home was destroyed in the earthquake and was rebuilt in 1907 at 920 Sacramento Street, where it still stands today.

Cameron wrote extensively, seeking to gain financial support for her mission, in publications including Women and Missions and a pamphlet titled "The Yellow Slave Traffic". This writing often furthered orientalist depictions of Chinese women, but also challenged popular preconceptions that such women were incapable of integrating into American society.

Cameron also founded homes for Chinese children, some of them orphans or the children of the rescued women. In 1915 she established the Tooker Memorial Home for girls in Oakland with donations from the Nathaniel Tooker family. It was later renamed Ming Quong, or "radiant light." A second Ming Quong home in Oakland was designed by Julia Morgan and completed in 1925. It was later sold and became part of the Mills College campus. The Chung Mei Home, established in 1923, served to house young boys until 1954. It is currently the site of the K2 Summit charter school in El Cerrito. In 1935, a third Ming Quong home—the "baby house"—was founded in Los Gatos, California. Younger Chinese American girls were taken care of here until they were old enough (age 13) to move to Oakland. After the home closed in 1958, the building became part of nonprofit social services, currently Pacific Clinics.

== Later life and legacy (1934–1968) ==
Cameron retired from her missionary work and the Presbyterian Home in 1934. She is credited with saving and educating over 2,000 Chinese immigrant women and girls. Before her death, she was considered something of a "national icon", and her life story was told in three biographies, some with fictional elements. While most attention has been focused on Cameron, her work was made possible by Tien Fuh Wu and other aides, who also took part in dangerous rescues, translated for Cameron, and advocated for trafficked women.

In 1942, the Presbyterian Home was renamed the Donaldina Cameron House. The building in Chinatown in San Francisco serves as a multi-service nonprofit agency serving the local Asian communities through supportive youth programs, social services, and counseling.

After retirement, Donaldina moved to Palo Alto in 1942. She died there on January 4, 1968, aged 98.

== In the media ==
Miranda Raison portrays a character inspired by Cameron, Nellie Davenport, in the American television series Warrior (2019).

The historical fiction novel, The Paper Daughters of Chinatown (2020) by Heather B. Moore includes a fictionalized depiction of Cameron.

The book "The Phoenix Crown" (2024) by Kate Quinn and Janie Chang, presents a fictional story set within Chinatown and other areas of San Francisco with many mentions of Cameron and her work.

Chinatown’s Angry Angel: The Story of Donaldina Cameron, a biography published in 1977 by Mildred Crowl Martin. A biography about Donaldina Cameron who was a Missionary and social worker in San Francisco's Chinatown fighting against human trafficking which covers the details of her life from 1896-1968.

== See also ==
- Tye Leung Schulze: Cameron mentored Schulze, who would assist Cameron in saving enslaved Chinese in San Francisco.
