= Joe Fong =

Macanese-American former gang leader (born c.1954)

- Born: 1954 or 1955 (age 71–72); Portuguese Macau
- Education: Galileo High School; UC Davis (BA); UCLA (MA)
- Organization: Joe Boys
- Opponent: Wah Ching
- Status: Released
- Criminal charges: Attempted murder
- Penalty: Life

Details
- Imprisoned at: Deuel Vocational Institution

Joe Fong is a Macanese-American former gang leader who founded and led the Chung Ching Yee (Joe Boys or Joe Fong Boys) gang in Chinatown, San Francisco from 1971 until his arrest and incarceration in 1973, when he was eighteen years old. After his release in 1979, Fong attended college and graduate school.

== Early life ==
Fong, the sixth of ten children, emigrated to San Francisco from Macau at the age of eight with his family, and was found guilty of burglary three years later. When he was fifteen, his gang was absorbed by the Wah Ching. He attended Galileo High School.

== Gang activity ==
The Wah Ching were a youth gang formed in 1964 to protect newly-arrived immigrants from China against the bullying of the Chinese-Americans that had been born and raised in America to older generations. In the wake of the Immigration and Nationality Act of 1965, the Wah Ching had more opportunities to recruit new members; initially, the Wah Ching advocated for new immigrant protections to their elders in the Chinese Consolidated Benevolent Association, seeking their protection, but they were rebuffed. Instead, the Wah Ching developed into a street gang after some members were hired to serve first as lookouts, then as protection for illegal gambling parlors in Chinatown; as they gained experience with gambling operations, they began demanding a cut of the profits.

Later, the Wah Ching were absorbed into the Hop Sing Tong, or, as Bill Cardoso reported, the Hop Sing began using the Wah Ching name for their youth organization. The Yau Lai (or Yo Le) split from the Wah Ching in 1969, founded by members unhappy with the gang's merger into the Hop Sing. The Chung Ching Yee (later, the Joe Fong Boys or just Joe Boys) were formed by Joe Fong as a splinter group of the Yau Lai in 1971, and claimed to be independent of any existing Chinatown organizations. After Fong was sent to a youth reformatory in spring 1971, his splinter group was re-absorbed into the Yau Lai; upon his release, he broke off again with a trusted lieutenant, Raymond Leung, on October 1. Leung was shot and killed the next day. Joe Fong moved his operations to the Richmond district on the western edge of San Francisco and renamed his group the Chung Ching Yee (after the heroes of the Water Margin) in 1972. By 1973, the struggle between the Chung Ching Yee and the Wah Ching had erupted into a war that had claimed 13 lives since 1969; Joe Fong was already serving a life sentence for an attempted murder at that point.

If the moon had a hole in it, they would say that the Joe Fong gang did it. It is an easy solution to anything—something that the public will buy because the media has conditioned them to it. You have a shooting? Mention Joe Fong's name and then if fits into a picture. You have something like the Golden Dragon? Mention Joe Fong and you have an easy way to explain it.

— Joe Fong, Sep 25, 1977 San Francisco Examiner & Chronicle

Fong had been arrested early on the morning of October 2, 1972, accused of attempted murder following a drive-by shooting that had occurred half an hour earlier. The victims were parked in three cars near a bus zone on Hyde, near the intersection with Sacramento; a blue Oldsmobile approached them traveling in the same direction, fired nine or ten shots into the victims' cars, then sped off towards California. Because the victims were associated with the Wah Ching, the Joe Boys were suspected as the shooters. Fong was taken into custody at the Foster's West cafeteria near Golden Gate and Polk. At his trial, prosecution witnesses testified that Fong was in the shooters' car, and he was convicted and given a life sentence.

In April 1973, the San Francisco Chronicle published an article which shed doubt on his guilt. Two people told the Chronicle they had attended a double feature with Fong at Stonestown Cinemas, ending with Lovers and Other Strangers at midnight; after the films they drove to Foster's for a late dinner. In addition, Fong and the others tested negative for gunshot residue on their hands. Finally, the actual shooter confessed several months later, and testified that he and the driver were the only ones in that car that night. Attorneys for Fong filed for a writ of habeas corpus, which was denied in October 1973.

While imprisoned at Deuel Vocational Institute near Tracy, California, Fong began to speak out about his reputation as a gang leader, which he said was retaliation for how he had been so outspoken in advocating for the rights of new immigrants. Fong pointed out the arrest of Walter Ang, a former recreational coordinator for Chinese Youth Alternatives (CYA), a community organization that works with delinquent youths, was being touted as a major break in the investigation of the Golden Dragon massacre because of Ang's tenuous ties with the Joe Boys. In the wake of the Golden Dragon, Bill Cardoso compared Fong to Joe Gallo.

== After release ==
Fong was released on November 12, 1979, and went on to attend the College of San Mateo and UC Davis, graduating with a bachelor's degree in political science. He then earned a master's degree from UCLA.
