= Raymond "Shrimp Boy" Chow =

Chinese-American criminal (born 1959)

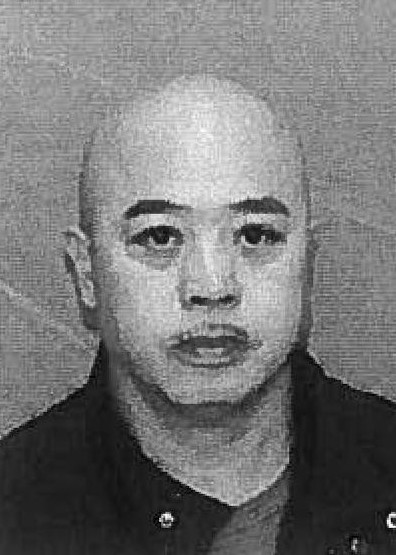
- Chow, c. 2016
- Born: Chow Kwok-cheung; December 31, 1959 (age 66); British Hong Kong
- Other names: Shrimp Boy; Ha Jai
- Occupation: Former Triad member
- Spouses: Anna Ma (m. 1980; div. 1986) Cindy Szeto (m. 1990; div. 1992)
- Status: Incarcerated at USP Terre Haute
- Convictions: Murder, conspiracy to commit murder, robbery, aggravated assault, illegal possession of firearms, racketeering
- Penalty: Life imprisonment

Raymond "Shrimp Boy" Chow
- Traditional Chinese: 周國祥
- Simplified Chinese: 周国祥
Transcriptions
Standard Mandarin
- Hanyu Pinyin: Zhōu Guóxiáng
Yue: Cantonese
- Jyutping: zau1 gwok3 coeng4

Raymond "Shrimp Boy" Kwok-Cheung Chow (Chinese: 周國祥; Jyutping: zau1 gwok3 coeng4; born December 31, 1959) is a Hong Kong-born felon with ties to a San Francisco Chinatown street gang and an organized crime syndicate, including the American branch of the Hong Kong-based triad Wo Hop To and the Hop Sing Boys.

In 2006, Chow became the leader of the Ghee Kung Tong (CKT), a Chinese fraternal association based in San Francisco, California. In 2014, Chow along with 28 other defendants including former California State Senator Leland Yee, were indicted for racketeering, money laundering, and a host of other alleged criminal activities. Leland Yee pleaded guilty to racketeering in July 2015 for conspiring with his campaign fundraiser to defeat donation limits through money laundering. Despite initial press releases, Chow was not indicted in a racketeering conspiracy with Leland Yee. Chow was indicted in a racketeering conspiracy which alleged that he oversaw a criminal faction of the Ghee Kung Tong. Chow is the only co-defendant of 29 to publicly profess his innocence and ask for an expedited jury trial. His trial began on November 9, 2015. On January 8, 2016, Chow was found guilty on all 162 charges, including one count of murder. He was sentenced to life in prison without parole, plus 20 years.

== Personal life ==
Chow was born on December 31, 1959, in Hong Kong, then a British colony. He is of Taishanese descent, and had three brothers: two older and one younger. His nickname "Shrimp Boy" (蝦仔; haa1 zai2) was reportedly bestowed by his grandmother, due to his small stature.

His father owned a barbershop, but lost his business to gambling debts when Chow was eight. The family moved into a single room shack for a year, until it burned down. On the program Gangland, Chow said he first joined a gang in his native Hong Kong when he was nine years old. After joining the gang, he intervened in a fight involving his gang mentor by striking his mentor's opponent on the head with a knife, becoming a gang hero in the process. Chow came to the United States with his parents at the age of 17, and dropped out of high school after approximately one month when he became involved with the Hop Sing Tong gang.

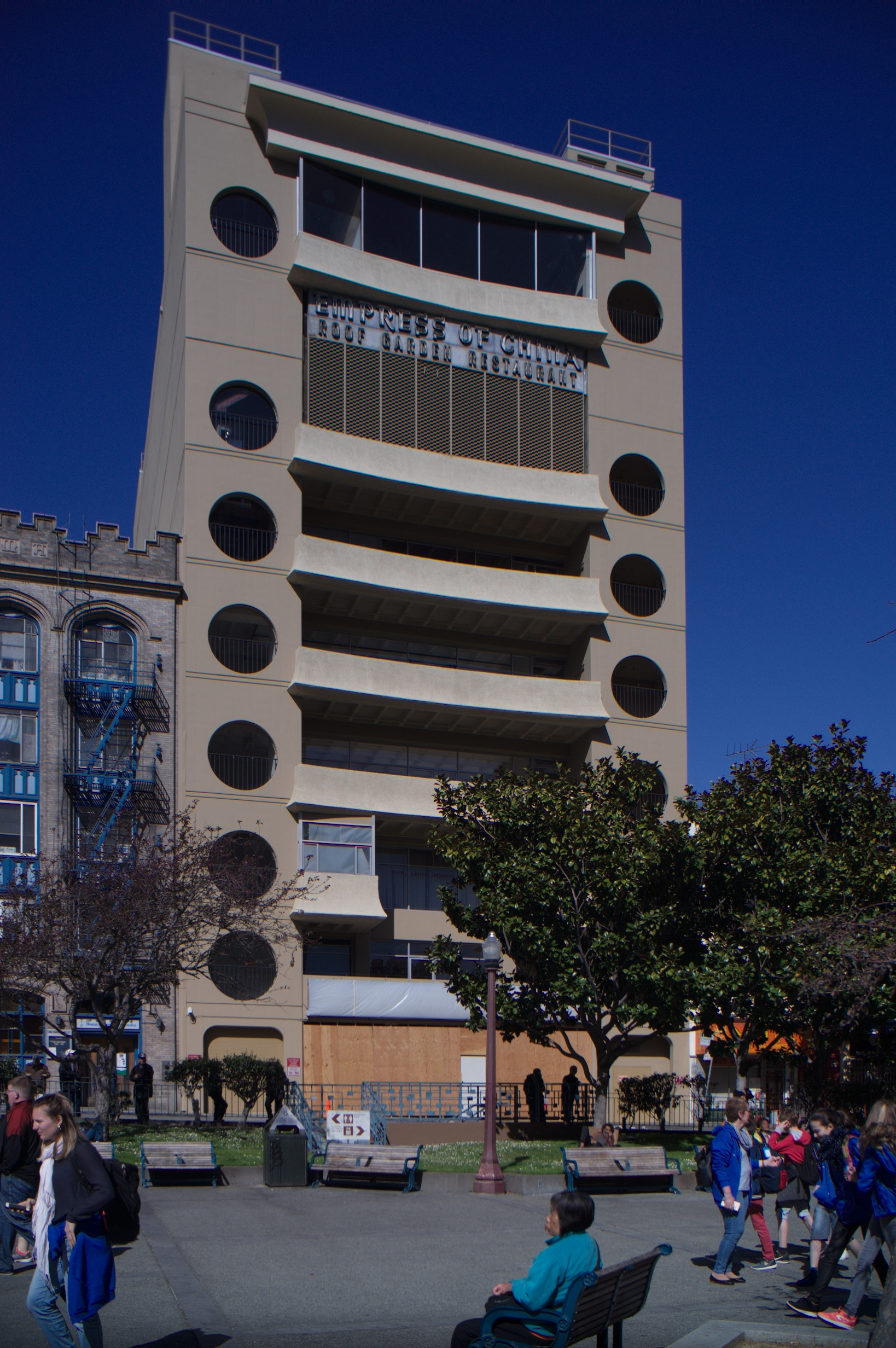
The Empress of China restaurant atop the China Trade Center overlooks Portsmouth Square in Chinatown (2018)

Chow has been married twice: to Anna Ma (1980–86) and Cindy Szeto (1990–92). His marriage to Szeto was not registered, but they had a reception at the Empress of China restaurant at the top of the China Trade Center, and it ended when he was arrested in 1992.

After they met in 2008 until his arrest, Chow lived with Alicia Lo, her 11-year-old daughter, and two dogs. Chow had publicly renounced his former life of crime, and Lo, a UC Berkeley graduate without Chow's criminal ties, believed she was gradually rehabilitating Chow by introducing him to mainstream American culture. Meanwhile, Chow was teaching Lo Chinese culture.

Chow wrote an autobiography entitled Shrimp Boy: The Sun of the Underworld (2011); the title was later updated to Shrimp Boy: Life of Crime, Violence and Redemption Inside the Chinatown Underworld (2013). The manuscript remains unpublished under a restraining order served to Lo in August 2016 after Chow was sentenced to two life terms in prison; no one may publish or profit from it until the government recovers approximately $255,000 in seized assets and fines.

== Criminal activity ==
Chow stated he carried a letter of introduction from the leader of his gang in Hong Kong when he emigrated to San Francisco, joining the Hop Sing Boys. In an early incident, when he was 17, he was dropped off at a home in Hillsborough and was told to beat the resident to send a message from La Cosa Nostra; he finished the beating with the help of a two-by-four in two minutes and earned $3,000. One year after arriving in the city, Chow was involved in the infamous Golden Dragon massacre in 1977, dining at the restaurant with other Hop Sing Boys members. In the wake of the 1977 shooting, the Wah Ching were ascendant and the Hop Sing were chased out of San Francisco.

=== Armed robbery and mayhem; 1980s reform ===
Chow was first convicted of a crime in the United States in 1978, for an armed robbery in Chinatown, San Francisco which occurred on February 17, 1978. A victim identified Chow as one of a trio of robbers who had held up a group of 23 at a meeting of the Chinese-American Institute of Engineers. When one of the victims was being returned from the Hall of Justice, he recognized Chow's distinctive jade ring and medallion. Chow received an 11-year sentence for the 1978 robbery, of which he served 7 years and 4 months. During his first stint in prison, Chow studied to become a deep-sea welder, but his education was interrupted by a prison riot and he turned to dealing heroin inside San Quentin instead. He was released on April 30, 1985.

After being released, Chow stopped at a noodle shop on his way back to San Francisco; he convinced the prostitutes outside to work for him and set up an escort service. One year later, in 1986, Chow was charged with 28 counts of assault with a deadly weapon, attempted murder, mayhem, and illegal possession of a firearm, related to the shooting of David Quach, a Wah Ching gang member, at the Golden Key Restaurant in San Francisco. Quach had been in an altercation with Chow's sister-in-law, Karen Ma. Chow was convicted in 1987 and sentenced to serve three years in prison. He was released in 1989. After his second release, Chow said he tried to renounce crime and found work as a bagger in a Daly City grocery store, but he left that job when his boss became suspicious after receiving a phone call from the SFPD gang task force. He also tried to work as a bodyguard in an Oakland Casino, but met Peter Chong, who had recently arrived from Hong Kong, shortly afterward.

=== Involvement with Wo Hop To ===
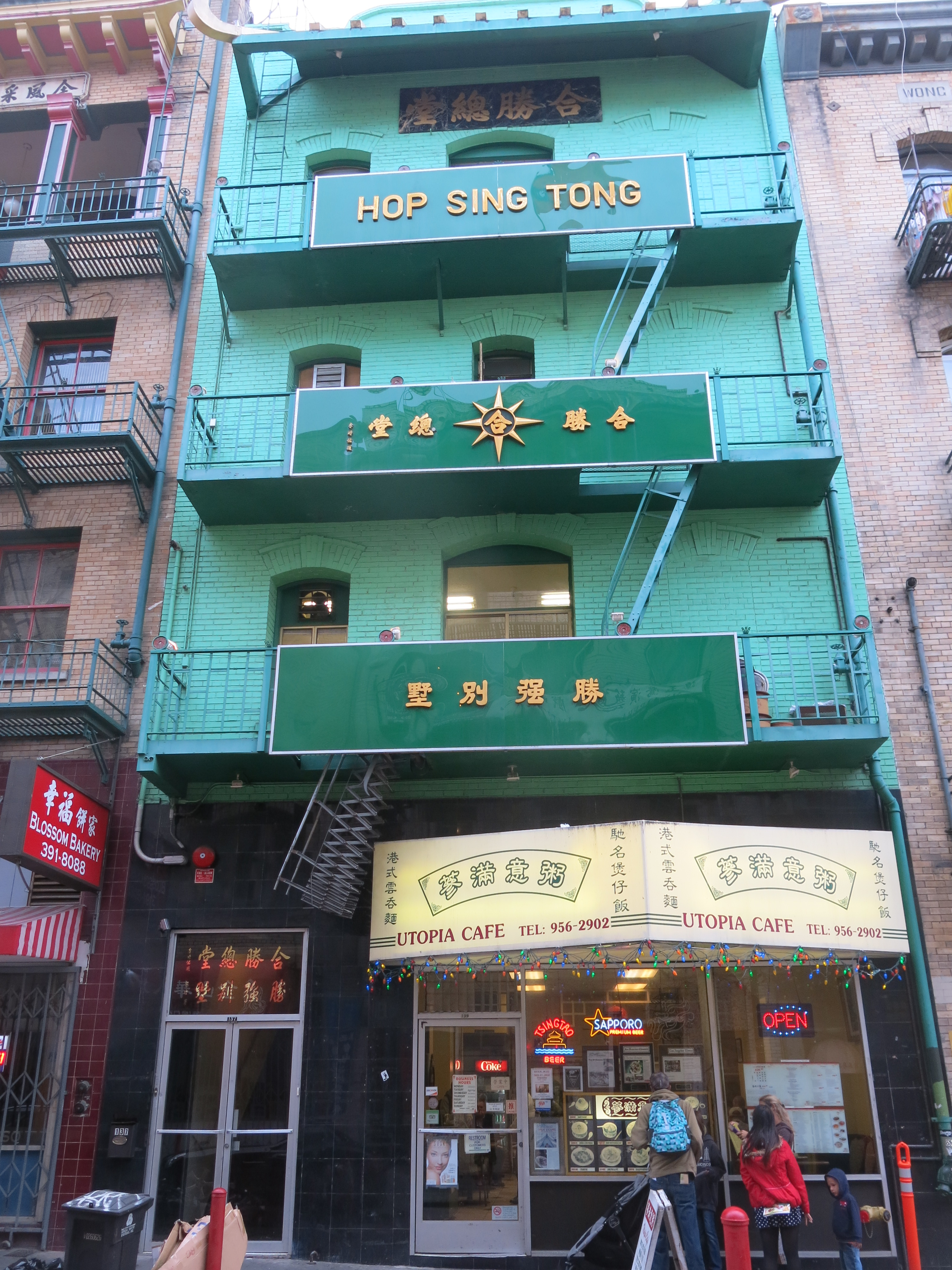
Hop Sing Tong building on Waverly Place in San Francisco's Chinatown (2013)

Around 1989, Chong, a member of the Wo Hop To Triad, was sent to San Francisco, which was intended to be the first location for the Triad's plan to establish itself in America. Chong adopted Chow, then head of the Hop Sing, as his American lieutenant shortly after his arrival and the two formed an alliance. Under the alliance, the Hop Sing and Wo Hop To merged, and an umbrella organization, Tien Hu Wui, was formed to oversee their combined business. Chow opened a boy's athletic club in the Hop Sing Tong building basement in San Francisco to recruit new members, drawing from teenagers influenced by the heroic bloodshed genre of Hong Kong action cinema. Part of the initiation involved leading new recruits through a series of 36 loyalty oaths, promising death if any was broken. According to court records, Chow was also head of day-to-day operations.

Early in the morning of August 28, 1990, Chow was in the lead car of two that were stopped by police after making an illegal U-turn in Foster City. Chow claimed he was driving an inebriated friend home from a bar, but was unable to produce the registration and could not account for his whereabouts earlier in the day. Norman Hsu was a passenger; Hsu claimed he had been kidnapped but declined to implicate Chow. The officer noticed Hsu appeared to be nervous and was trying to get his attention. When he was able to speak privately with the officer, Hsu stated "I'm being kidnapped, those three have been holding me against my will in Daly City for twelve hours." Hsu then told the officer he was being held in connection with a debt he owed Chow, and that the safety of him and his family had been threatened if he was unable to pay.

At about the same time, the Wah Ching and Wo Hop To were struggling for power in San Francisco. Wah Ching member Danny Phat Vong was killed in April 1990 outside the Cats nightclub on Geary, and in retaliation, the Wah Ching killed Wo Hop To member Michael Bit Chen Wu outside The Purple Onion, a nightclub in North Beach, one month later. Wah Ching leader Danny Wong called for a cease-fire at the Harbor Village, and was toasted by Chong for his peacemaking efforts. The toast for peace was later repeated at Chow's wedding, who called Chong "Uncle to us all." Despite the apparent cease-fire, the violence continued, culminating in the assassination of Wong in April 1991.

Chong was summoned to testify before the United States Senate on November 5, 1991, and was asked if he was the head of the Wo Hop To, and if he was responsible or involved in the murder of Danny Wong. Chong declined to answer each question, citing his Fifth Amendment rights.

=== Firearms trafficking and racketeering ===
Chow was arrested on May 31, 1992 for suspected drug dealing at LaGuardia Airport while holding $12,000 in cash, which led him to believe there was a confidential informant within the gang. After Chow noticed Madeline "Mayflower" Lee's sentence was significantly lighter than her partners following their arrest for an attempted robbery, Chow identified her as the informant and twice ordered beatings of Lee. Lee noted the license plate of the getaway car after the first beating, which left her with a broken shoulder and missing teeth; Lee called Chow with the license plate information, asking him to find out who had beaten her. At his 1996 trial for racketeering, the prosecution alleged that Chow ordered her beaten again because she was insufficiently injured. During the second beating, a passing police officer intervened and one of the assailants, Raymond Lei, was arrested. Chow ordered Lee to drop the charges against Lei, but she refused, and instead helped police assemble a case against the leadership of the Wo Hop To: Chow and Chong.

In October 1993, Chow, Chong, and several others were indicted on racketeering charges. Chow had already been arrested on charges of murder for hire, drug trafficking, and illegal firearms, and Chong fled the United States a few days ahead of the racketeering indictment. Chow was later tried in two separate proceedings. The first trial was for illegal gun sales and the second was for racketeering. His first trial resulted in a conviction on February 21, 1995, two weeks after it started, for six counts of illegal firearms trafficking. Two of his co-defendants had earlier pleaded guilty in exchange for reduced sentences. A year and a half after his conviction, Chow was sentenced to more than 23 years; sentencing for the 1995 conviction had been delayed while he was undergoing his second trial. An appeal in 1998 was unsuccessful; the Ninth Circuit ruled "the evidence against Chow was so overwhelming that it is unlikely the jury would have reached any other verdict".

Chow's second trial (for racketeering) started in March 1996 and was dismissed as a mistrial in May 1996. At the outset, the defense portrayed him as a Buddhist and practitioner of kung fu, rather than a criminal mastermind trying to consolidate organized crime in Chinatowns nationwide. The defense strategy also claimed the government's case was simply not credible, as most of the evidence was produced by criminals who were testifying in exchange for reduced sentences. Two jurors said there was "no chance of reaching a unanimous verdict" after six days of deliberation. The lead lawyer for Chow's defense, Maureen Kallins, bragged that authorities had "spent $10 million to get this guy and they couldn't get him on any of the 38 counts." Kallins was a popular choice for defendants in the Bay Area.

After Chong was captured and extradited to the United States in 2000, Chow became an informant and testified against his former boss in exchange for a reduced sentence. He was first released to U.S. Immigration and Customs Enforcement in May 2002, and then put into supervised release from prison in January 2003. Chow stated that one reason he turned on Chong in 2000 was because he felt betrayed after Chong had hired away Kallins, his defense attorney from the second trial. Kallins was later removed from Chong's defense at his request, as her defense of Chow in the 1996 trial relied on blaming Chong for the crimes, a potential conflict of interest.

As part of the deal to win early release in 2003, Chow testified against Chong. In addition, Chow's application for a resident visa was supported by the government. He requested a new identity and location under the witness protection but his request was denied by the prosecuting attorney; he was returned to San Francisco and was also required to wear a tracking device under the terms of his release. In addition, he was granted a monthly allowance of $2,000. Because Chow had applied for a S-5 visa (intended for witnesses in a criminal case) but had not yet secured it, his immigration status was not permanent and he could not legally work in the United States; in 2014, more than ten years after his release, the visa application was still pending. Initially, Chow lived with his brother and his brother's girlfriend, who complained about the amount of toilet paper he used.

Chow's confinement to home ended in 2004, and his period of supervised release ended in 2005. Unemployable and afraid to leave his home, he suffered a nervous breakdown in 2004. As part of his rehabilitation, he counseled troubled youths about "the frame of the criminal mind" and began to meditate at Ocean Beach. Three days of meditation led him to an epiphany: "I change myself. I tell myself I'm not going to cross the line and commit the crime."

=== Murder of Allen Leung ===
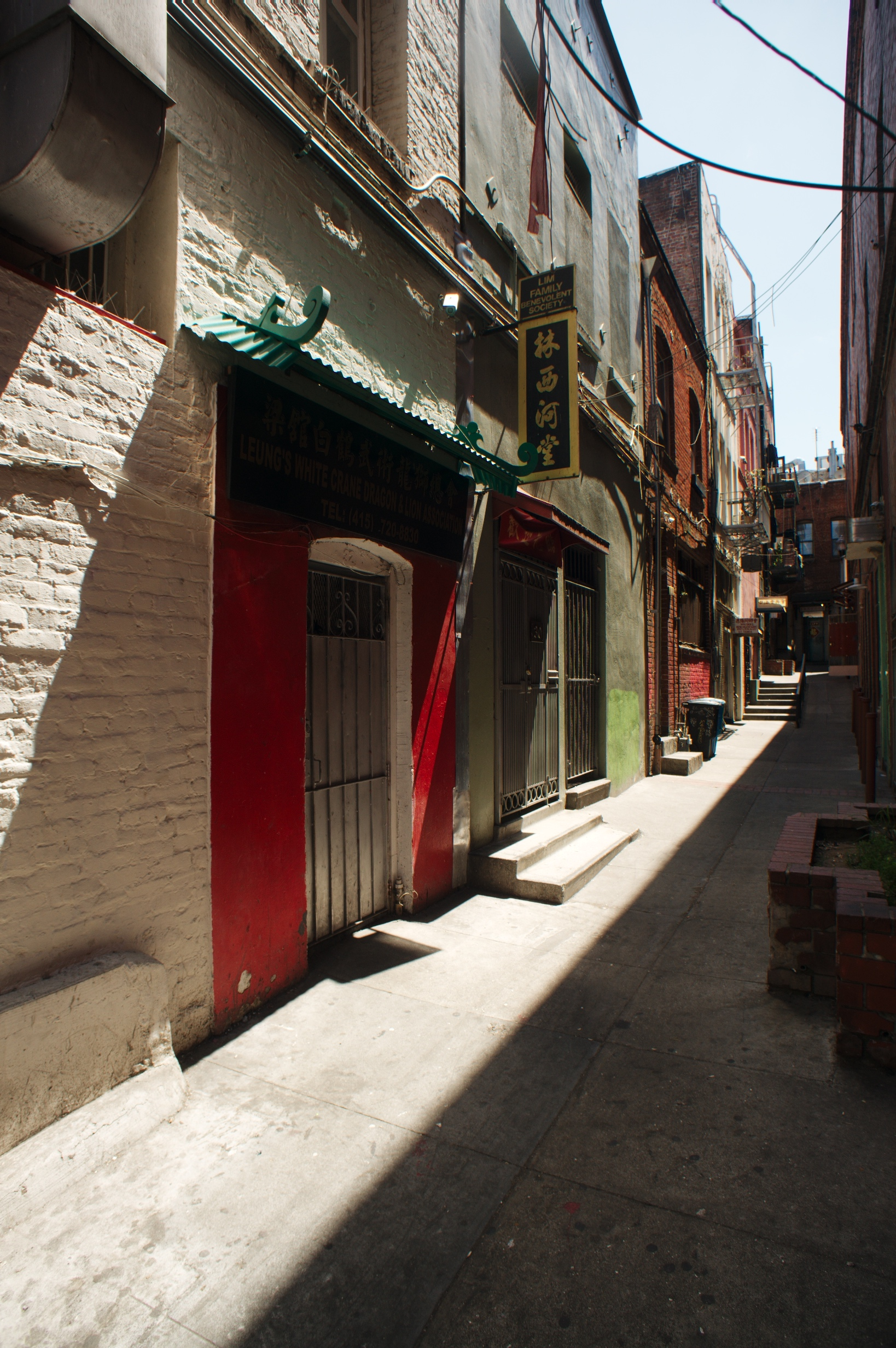
Leung's White Crane, just inside the entrance to St. Louis Alley

Shortly after Chow was released from prison, in late 2003, Allen Leung approached the FBI saying that Chow intended to "clean up Chinatown" by removing him and the head of another tong, according to testimony at Chow's 2015 trial from William Wu, the agent handling Chow. Leung was a prominent Chinatown leader, who had founded (with his two brothers) the Leung's White Crane Dragon and Lion Dance Association in 1971 and had served as president of the Hop Sing Tong (HST) four times, beginning in 1994 after the previous Hop Sing leadership (Chong and Chow) were in exile or imprisoned. Leung was also the dragon head of the Hung Moon Ghee Kong Tong (CKT), a fraternal association in San Francisco sometimes referred to as the Chinese Freemasons. An associate of Chow contacted Jack Lee, another HST elder, to ask for money "to do business" with the Hop Sing.

Translation of letter
to Hop Sing Tong

Someone opened fire at your front door, but you're just chickens—, no response to it. Just keeping your mouth quiet. Having this kind of leader makes all the tongs lose face. I have a poem to dedicate to you: 'You should be embarrassed for a thousand years and your reputation stink for ten thousand years.'

Lee raised $120,000 in pledges for a planned local youth group from Hop Sing chapters in other western states. While Hop Sing was still deciding whether to release the money to Chow, the headquarters of four tongs and a restaurant were splattered with red paint on February 25, 2005, but the headquarters of the Hop Sing were spared. However, on March 11, 2005, the Hop Sing voted to turn down the request for money; the next day, shots were fired into the headquarters of Hop Sing. A threatening letter written in Chinese was sent to the Hop Sing Tong. Thau Benh "Kevin" Cam later testified that Chow had ordered him to shoot the Hop Sing Tong headquarters.

Leung approached the FBI again in the wake of the Hop Sing shooting, and said that Chow had personally demanded $100,000 at the Hop Sing headquarters in late 2004. Since Chow was still on supervised release, the FBI questioned him about the incident, and Chow countered that Hop Sing had instead approached him and "wanted him to loan-shark the money." Shortly afterward, Chow was taken into custody on immigration charges. The charges stemmed from Chow's apparent association with Chinatown gangs, in violation of his bargain with prosecutors, and deportation proceedings began. Leung stated that Chow or his associates "will try to get him and the [Hop Sing] board members" in retaliation for the failed demand for money, but Leung refused to wear a listening device, and the extortion case died for lack of evidence.

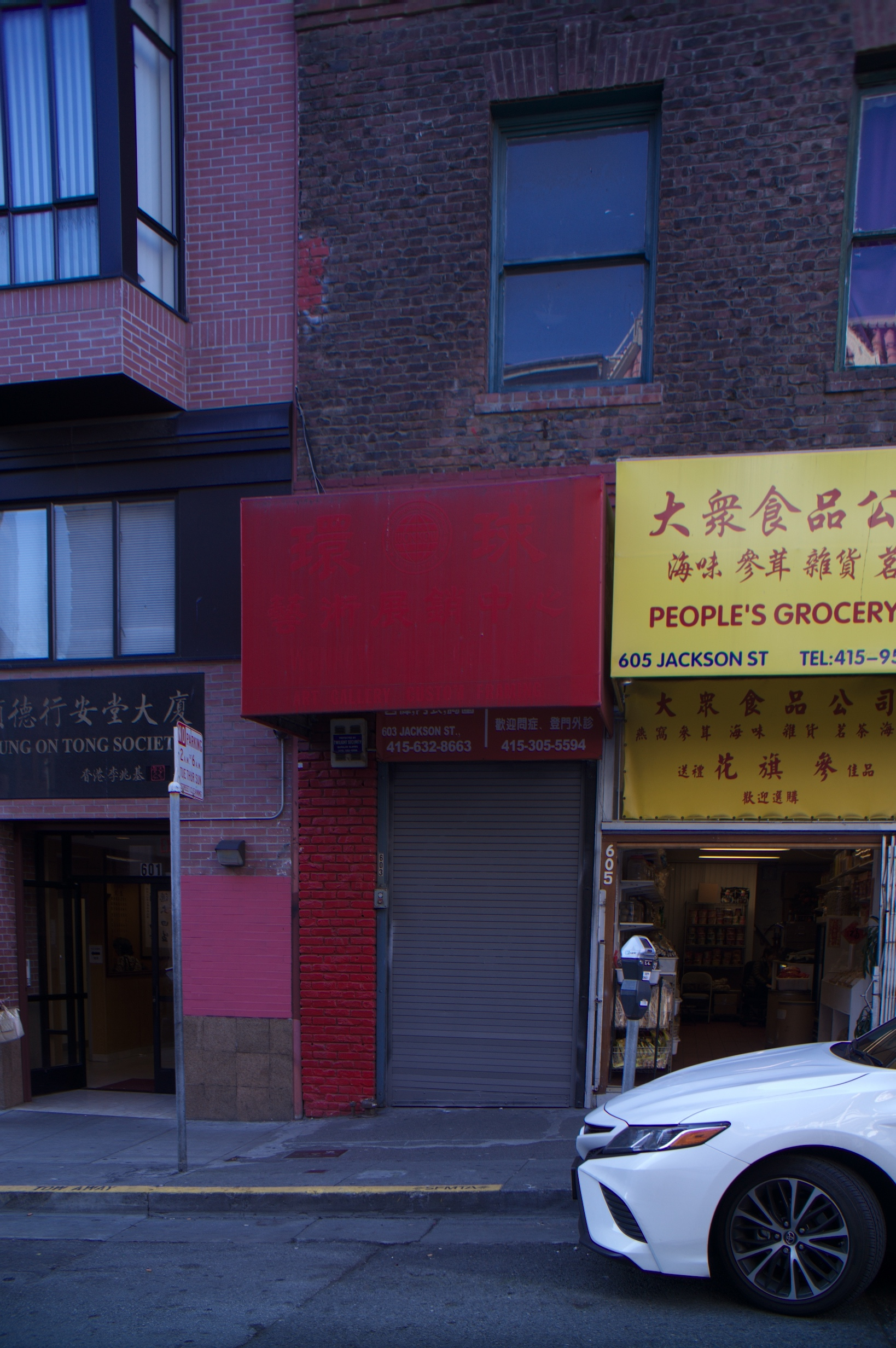
603 Jackson; the name of Leung's business, Wonkow Art Centres, can still be seen behind the red paint on the awning

Chow joined the CKT at around this time. According to Kongphet "Fat Joe" Chanthavong, Chow convened a meeting in mid-2005 in the back room of an Oakland bar, instructing Chanthavong and two others to murder Leung. At the time, Allen Leung was president of the Hop Sing Tong (HST) and dragon head of the CKT; because the HST had refused to loan money to Chow to start a business, he had become upset and told his associate, Wen Bing "Skinny Ray" Lei, that Lei should replace Leung as head of the HST. Cam corroborated Chanthavong's testimony that Lei should take over the CKT, adding that Chow complained about Leung's leadership. Chow then instructed Cam to coordinate with Lei to get rid of Allen Leung. Cam and Lei would later recruit Chanthavong into the plot to murder Leung. Chanthavong was tasked with driving by Leung's shop at 603 Jackson to watch Leung's movements. Allen Leung's son Clifton testified that in December 2005 or January 2006, Lei had entered Leung's shop on Jackson Street ostensibly to discuss business, but casually asked if the security cameras in the office were functional. Allen turned to Clifton, asking the same question, and Clifton said they did not work.

Allen Leung was shot to death on February 27, 2006, by an unidentified suspect at his Chinatown import-export business on Jackson Street. According to the police, the gunman entered Leung's office and demanded cash; although Leung offered it to him, the unknown suspect shot Leung in "an execution slaying" before Leung could hand over any money. During Chow's subsequent trial, Cam testified this was the third attempt on Leung's life; the first attempt was called off after Chanthavong withdrew, and the second attempt failed when Cam was unable to intercept Leung as he was leaving a banquet.

"Skinny Ray" Lei was later indicted in January 2017 for Leung's murder, but died in July 2018 from metastatic lung cancer before he could be tried.

=== Head of Ghee Kung Tong ===
Chow led a Freemason salute to Leung at his funeral on March 18, and ascended to the leadership of the CKT in a ceremony in August 2006, where he received an official certificate of honor from San Francisco, arranged by Supervisor Fiona Ma. San Francisco Police and the FBI began investigating the murder of Leung by staking out Chow's swearing-in ceremony. The government's probe of Chow was dubbed 'Operation White Suit' after Chow visibly and uniquely wore a white mourning suit to Leung's funeral. Although Chow had previously supported Lei as dragon head, they argued after Leung's funeral; Lei told Chow that no one respected him because of his conduct.

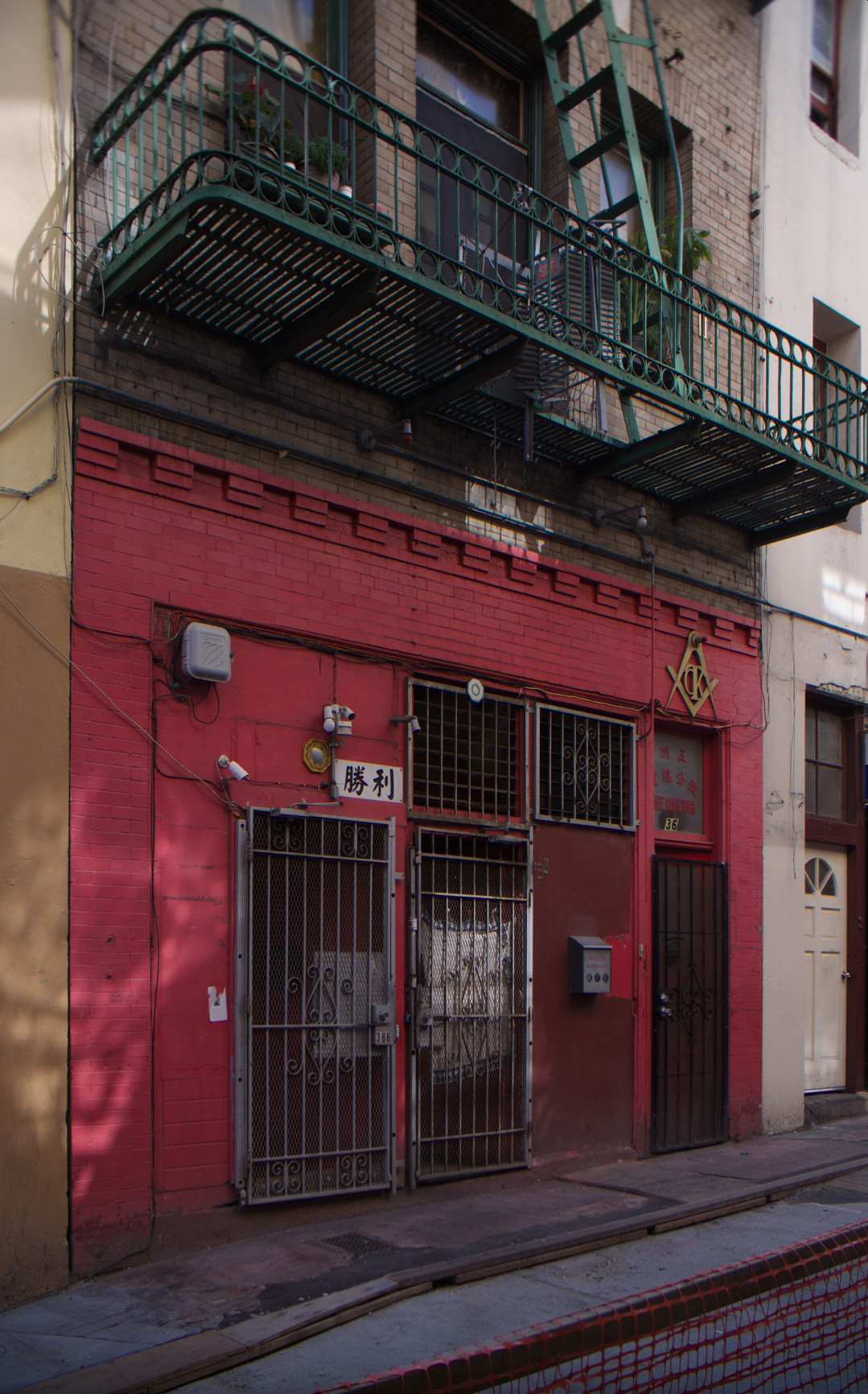
CKT headquarters, Spofford Street (2018)

After ascending to the head of CKT, Chow became publicly visible as a mentor to Asian and African American youths, speaking to dozens of community groups each year and receiving congratulations from U.S. Senator Dianne Feinstein for winning a "Change Agent" award in 2012 from Bayview Hunters Point Multipurpose Senior Services. According to a mayor's aide, Chow "[showed] up at events and [tried] to get pictures with politicians", eventually posting a picture he took with Gavin Newsom on his Facebook page.

Meanwhile, for 'Operation White Suit', an undercover FBI agent (identified either as UCE 4599 or by the alias "David Jordan") had been introduced to Chow in May 2010 as an East Coast emissary from La Cosa Nostra. During a June 2010 fishing trip in Hawaii, Chow told "Jordan" and another undercover agent (UCE 4527, "Jimmy Chen") that although he could not be involved in any illegal activities, he could introduce them to people who could. Chow later introduced "Jordan" to Keith Jackson, president of the San Francisco Board of Education and a close friend of Leland Yee, in August 2010. "Jordan" began laundering money with Chow's associates in February 2011. By April 2011, Chow and "Jordan" had grown so close that at a karaoke bar, Chow whispered to "Jordan" that he knew of and approved all criminal activities in the CKT, serving as a judge within the organization. The device that "Jordan" was wearing failed to record Chow's whisper.

"Jordan" used the CKT to launder more than $2 million, purportedly gathered from illegal activities and was later inducted in the CKT as a consultant in March 2012; although Chow never laundered any of the money, "Jordan" reported that Chow had sanctioned others within CKT to work with him. In May 2012, Chow was secretly recorded by the FBI while he was conferring with "George" Heng Nieh (Chow's driver), stating that he did not want the CKT involved with "Jordan", the undercover agent posing as a member of the Mafia, for fear the CKT would be labeled 'an underworld society' that participated in organized crime. The case against Chow was built in part on the thousands of dollars given by "Jordan" to Chow; on one occasion, "Jordan" gave Chow $2,000 as thanks for the opportunity to work with Nieh. Although Chow protested, saying "Damn, that is bribery money, dude — that's not good", he did not return the payment. "Jordan"'s activities later expanded by December 2013 to include the trafficking of stolen liquor, cigarettes without a tax stamp, and marijuana.

=== Murder of Jim Tat Kong ===
Jim Tat Kong opposed Chow for the leadership of HST during an election meeting held in 2011. According to Chanthavong, Chow was incensed that Kong had dared to challenge his authority and, at a karaoke bar after that meeting, told Chanthavong "somebody needs to take care of Jimmy". In addition, "Jordan" stated that Chow's biggest grievance with Kong was that Kong had slept with the wife of a HST member who had fled to China; Chow also disagreed with Kong's strong-arm tactics to intimidate other HST members to vote for him. Chow told "Jordan" he would be withdrawing his protection from Kong. According to "Jordan", after the election Chow was "extremely, extremely agitated, talking so openly about vengeance" and publicly denounced Kong, declaring "He is no longer my brother". Chow added "there would be people on the street lined up to take vengeance". Chow testified at his 2015 trial that he had expelled Kong from HST because Kong had used Chow's name and reputation to recruit new youth drug dealers. Although expelling Kong effectively stripped him of protection, Chow intended that "[Kong was] gonna get his ass whupped", but said he never meant to kill Kong. Although "Jordan" warned Chow that "someone's going to smoke [Kong]" after he lost protection from the HST, Chow replied "It's all good, you know; in the gangland, their own nature would take care of their own."

Two years later, Kong and his girlfriend Cindy Bao Feng Chen were found dead in their minivan near Fort Bragg on October 17, 2013; each had been killed by a single gunshot to the head. Although Chow would be tried and convicted for conspiracy to murder Kong, authorities would later indict Wing Wo "Fat Mark" Ma in 2017 for the pair's murder. Ma was a carpenter who built greenhouses and other structures for Kong's marijuana-growing operation. Ma was also a police informant who had bribed Harry Hu, an investigator for the Alameda County District Attorney's office, between 2008 and 2013 to shield Ma's criminal activities from prosecution, including the murders of Kong and Chen. Ma had called and met Hu for help shortly after Ma was questioned about the murders on October 22, 2013. Ma was convicted for the murders, bribery, and marijuana-related charges in November 2019 after a three-week trial.

=== Leland Yee dragnet ===
On March 26, 2014, Raymond Chow was arrested during an FBI raid in connection with an investigation into official corruption by State Senator Leland Yee. Chow faced charges of money laundering and conspiracy to deal stolen property. He was accused of operating a faction, or subgroup in the CKT, a benevolent association, as a racketeering enterprise that trafficked in drugs, weapons, and stolen items. Federal authorities alleged Chow's reformation was a façade, and charged him with seven counts of money laundering, two counts of conspiring to transport and receive stolen liquor, and one count of conspiracy to traffic untaxed cigarettes. He faced a maximum of 20 years imprisonment for each money laundering count.

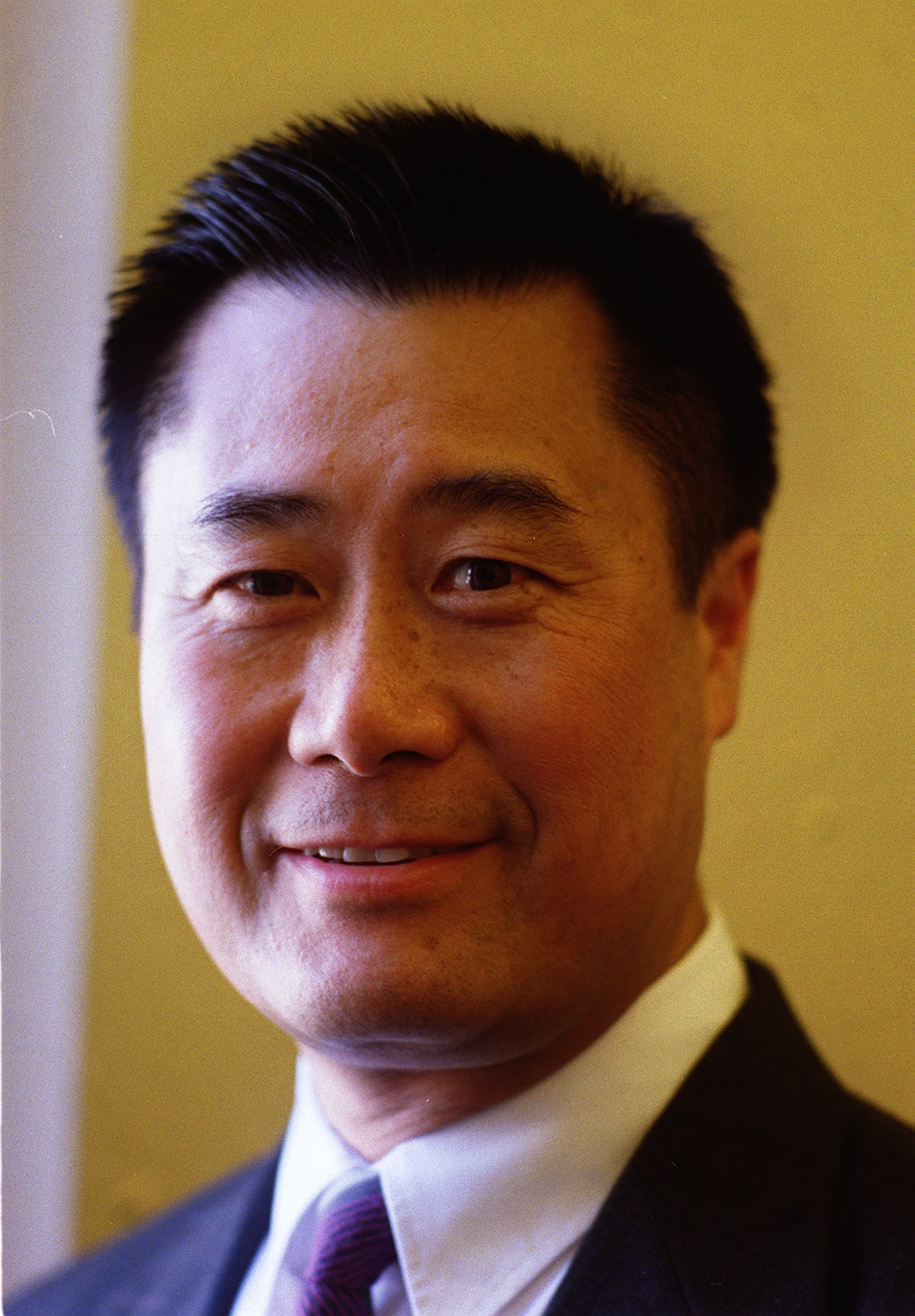
Leland Yee

In April 2014, trial lawyer Tony Serra joined Chow's defense team. Serra blasted the sting operation that led to Chow's arrest as entrapment: "They tempted my client in every fashion to commit a substantive crime." One of the key defense strategies, to present possible exculpatory evidence to the public, was denied by U.S. District Court Judge Charles Breyer in May 2014 on the grounds that it could disclose the identity of the undercover FBI agent known as "David Jordan".

A superseding 228-count indictment filed in July 2014 expanded the crimes to include racketeering, money laundering, unlicensed firearms dealing, fraud, narcotics conspiracy, murder for hire, wire fraud, and conspiracy to receive and transport stolen property. Chow pleaded not guilty to the added racketeering charge and Serra welcomed the new charges as a measure of the government's desperation: "They obviously want to target him. They obviously have a weak case or they wouldn’t target him in this manner. So we are delighted to confront them."

In September 2014, Chow sued the City of San Francisco and Mayor Edwin Lee, asking them to disclose records which Chow claimed would show that an undercover FBI agent, identified as UCE 4773 alias "Michael Anthony King", paid a total of $20,000 in bribes to Lee as campaign contributions. "King" and "Jordan" had worked together on the investigation into Leland Yee; "King" was the lead undercover agent until he was removed, allegedly for financial misconduct. According to FBI wiretaps, the bribes were solicited by others on behalf of Lee, but it was not clear if Lee was aware of their source. Keith Jackson was one of a trio charged with soliciting the bribe; by 2017, many of the charges had been dismissed and the remaining defendants accepted a no-contest plea deal in 2019 that resulted in no additional time served in prison. Judge Breyer ordered a separate trial for Yee and Jackson on the political bribery and illegal firearms importation charges following a hearing in November 2014.

On July 7, 2015, Chow declined to take a plea deal from prosecutors on the racketeering charges and was ordered to stand trial with seven other defendants in November. Yee and three other defendants had all pleaded guilty to racketeering on July 1; of the three associates, two also admitted to participating in illegal activities through CKT, including narcotics distribution, firearms sales, and murder-for-hire. None of the four who accepted the plea deal were required to testify against Chow.

Chow's defense team continued to excoriate the government investigation as entrapment, filing a motion to dismiss in August 2015 that claimed "the investigation stagnated quickly [shortly after it started in 2009] and is characterized by literally years of attempting to lure Chow into breaking the law to no avail"; prosecutors countered the motion included documents that had previously been sealed and the new motion to dismiss should also be sealed, but Judge Breyer disagreed, as the initial motion to dismiss had already been publicly posted. Judge Breyer threw out the motion to dismiss in late August, stating that Chow's defense had failed to prove the selective prosecution standard established in United States v. Armstrong. All seven of Chow's fellow defendants pleaded guilty in September, and were removed from the upcoming trial per a defense motion to sever the other defendants. Chow's defense team also claimed the trial date of November 2 would result in ineffective representation due to inadequate time to prepare, after receiving more than 100 gigabytes of evidence in discovery after August 25.

After announcing they had uncovered new evidence in September, on October 15, 2015, federal prosecutors formally added charges of conspiracy to murder in connection with the deaths of Allen Leung and Jim Tat Kong. No charges had been filed previously for Leung's murder until one of Chow's racketeering co-defendants said they had heard Chow ordered the killing. The defense for Chow argued that Kong had murdered Leung in an attempt to take over the HST and the deaths of Kong and Chen in 2013 were a double suicide. Judge Breyer severed all charges that could result in the death penalty from the upcoming trial, which meant Chow potentially faced two trials: one for the earlier charges of racketeering and money laundering under his 2014 indictment, and a second one for the murder charges. Prosecutors issued a third superseding 162-count indictment, and Chow pleaded not guilty to the new charges of murdering Leung and conspiracy to commit the murder of Kong in "aid of racketeering". Prosecutors stated the murder charges were required to carry the potential for a death penalty because of Chow's criminal history, and the charges could not be added without the approval of Attorney General Loretta Lynch; they requested the trial be delayed to accommodate her review. However, the murder conspiracy charges were later combined with the racketeering charges in a single trial, and prosecutors announced they would not seek the death penalty.

=== Racketeering and murder trial ===
Chow's latest trial began on November 9, 2015. For the prosecution's opening remarks, Assistant U.S. Attorney Waqar Hasib called Chow the "sun of the underworld universe" who had ordered "a hit, a cold-blooded gangland-style hit" on Allen Leung "like something straight out of 'The Godfather'." In addition, Hasib asserted that by withdrawing the gang's protection from Kong, Chow had doomed him to be murdered eventually. Serra responded by citing Chow's vow to reform himself and renounce crime after his last release: "This is not the face of a person who has killed to achieve that status [as head of CKT]. It's quasi-beatific."

I would get back in the [criminal] business anytime, but my freedom is very important to me at this time. I'm just one step away. If I truly am not able to make it, I will go back into the shady business.

— Raymond "Shrimp Boy" Chow, Recorded conversation with undercover FBI agent "Jimmy Chen"

"Fat Joe" Chanthavong, who had first met and befriended Chow in 2001 while both were serving their sentences in a federal prison, testified for the prosecution beginning on November 10, 2015. Chanthavong decided to testify against Chow in 2013 after hearing secret recordings made by the FBI in which Chow advised his driver that Chanthavong and another associate of Chow, "Andy" Man Lai Li, should continue making drug and gun deals with the undercover agent posing as "David Jordan"; Chanthavong testified that he and Li were being used as bait: "I felt like I was getting thrown under the bus, that I was expendable". Other witnesses for the prosecution included "Kevin" Cam, "Andy" Li, and "Jimmy Chen" and "David Jordan", the undercover FBI agents; the courtroom was closed to the public during the agents' testimony to protect their identity.

The testimony phase of the trial was temporarily delayed during the illness of one of the defense lawyers; during the delay, defense lead lawyer Serra pushed to have "Jordan"'s identity revealed so they could conduct a background investigation. In addition, Serra asked to put one of the prosecution lawyers on the witness stand to impeach the credibility of "Andy" Li.

"Chen"'s testimony supported Chow's assertion that he had reformed. During their conversations, Chow would steer the topic away from illegal activities towards the book he was writing, at one point telling "Chen" that "money is not a big deal as long as one is happy", and he advised "Chen" to stay away from the criminal life. Taking the stand as the first defense witness on December 21, Chow testified about his renunciation of his former life of crime after his nervous breakdown in 2004. In addition, Chow testified the payments that had been pressed upon him by the undercover FBI agent known as David Jordan were accepted only "for his love and respect" and "if anyone tell me it's illegal money, drugs, alcohol ... I will not receive these monies."

On January 8, 2016, Chow was found guilty on all 162 counts, including murder in aid of racketeering, racketeering conspiracy, conspiring to murder another rival, receiving and transporting stolen liquor across state lines, and money laundering. Chow's lawyers filed for a new trial, alleging the number of defense witnesses was unfairly limited and previous testimony in 2002 regarding the 1991 murder of Danny Wong had been wrongfully used against him. Judge Breyer denied the motion for a new trial on June 2, 2016. He was sentenced to two life terms (one for racketeering, and one for murder) plus twenty years for the other convictions on August 4, 2016. He is serving his sentence at Terre Haute USP.

In May 2019, a panel of three judges from the 9th U.S. Circuit Court of Appeals upheld his conviction and rejected his appeal. The United States District Court for the Northern District of California denied his motion for compassionate release in 2020, with Judge Breyer noting "The Court therefore cannot conclude that '[t]he defendant is not a danger to the safety of any other person or to the community'".
