= Jackson Street Boys =

- Founded: 1990s
- Founding location: San Francisco, California, United States
- Years active: 1990-present
- Territory: Northern California
- Ethnicity: Primarily Cantonese Vietnamese Americans
- Criminal activities: Extortion, racketeering, drug trafficking, drug dealing, arson, assault, murder, robbery, home invasions, car theft, burglary, loan sharking, credit card fraud, and illegal gambling
- Allies: Seven Stars, 21 Boys
- Rivals: Wah Ching, Hop Sing Boys

The Jackson Boyz, JBZ or Jackson Street Boys, JSB are or were a San Francisco, California based Asian American street gang and criminal organization The gang, composed of Cantonese and Vietnamese members, has been centered in San Francisco's Chinatown, and was named for Jackson Street. The Jackson Street Boys also have a presence in other U.S. cities.

However, there are members of the gang who are students in middle schools and high schools in addition to their Chinatown presence. The gang was involved in many criminal acts including the burning of a Chinese restaurant sparked by the owner's debt to the gang. Although the suspects were arrested, they were soon released.

== Formation ==
The Jackson Boys gang was the successor to the Wo Hop To Triad which ruled the streets of San Francisco's Chinatown in the 1980s and early 1990s. The Jackson Street Boys was founded by three brothers, Bobby Tsan, Johnny Tsan and Tommy Tsan, who were former Wah Ching members who had defected to the Wo Hop To after the Wo Hop To forced the Wah Ching out of San Francisco. After law enforcement cracked down on the Wo Hop To around 1992, the Jackson Street Boys resumed what a SFPD officer described in 2000 as "the same stuff on a smaller scale and without the same visibility", including extortion of local merchants and operating gambling dens.

== Criminal activities ==
One of the more noted crimes that the gang was involved in occurred on June 30, 1995. One faction of the Jackson Street Boys opened fire on another on a busy Chinatown street, Stockton Street, during the daytime. Seven innocent bystanders were struck, including a pregnant woman. Three males, ages 18, 16, and 14, were arrested in connection with the shooting. Jackson Boys were also the primary trafficker of illegal fireworks back when fireworks were blatantly sold on the streets of Chinatown.
