= Wo Hop To =

Hong Kong criminal triad

- 和合圖
- Founded: 1908
- Founding location: Sai Ying Pun, Hong Kong
- Territory: Hong Kong; San Francisco
- Leaders: US: Peter Chong; Raymond Kwok Chow
- Allies: Sun Yee On Tiny Rascal Gang
- Rivals: Wah Ching

Wo Hop To, or WHT (Chinese: 和合圖; Jyutping: wo^{4} hap^{6} tou^{4}), is a triad group based in Wan Chai, Hong Kong. The name translates to "Harmoniously United Association", or "Harmonious Union Plan", and is thought to have been founded in 1908 in Sai Ying Pun as a secret political organisation in opposition to the Qing dynasty. They are one of the Four Major Gangs (四大黑幫) of Hong Kong, the others being Wo Shing Wo, 14K and Sun Yee On.

== Criminal activity ==
Wo Hop To specialises in protection rackets and is affiliated with the Sun Yee On triad.

== Activity in the United States ==
During the early 1990s, Wo Hop To expanded into the United States, beginning in San Francisco. The U.S. Wo Hop To was led by Peter Chong (also known as "Uncle Chong") and Raymond "Shrimp Boy" Chow, a former Hop Sing Boys gang member. The Wo Hop To had plans to control all the Asian gangs in San Francisco and, from there, to branch out into drug distribution nationwide. Wo Hop To chased the Wah Ching gang out of the Bay Area and the Wah Ching headed to Southern California. The Wah Ching was the only surviving Chinatown gang during the 1980s. The Hop Sing Boys and Joe Boys were dismantled by police after the Golden Dragon massacre.

The Wo Hop To controlled Chinatown illegal activities after killing the Wah Ching leader Danny Wong.
