= Chung Ching Yee =

Defunct Chinese-American youth gang

- Founded by: Joe Fong
- Founding location: Chinatown, San Francisco, California, United States
- Years active: 1969–1977
- Territory: United States
- Ethnicity: Chinese American, Asian American
- Criminal activities: Drug trafficking, fireworks trafficking, extortion, robbery, murder, burglary, theft
- Allies: Suey Sing Tong
- Rivals: Wah Ching, Hop Sing Tong

Chung Ching Yee
- Traditional Chinese: 忠精義
- Simplified Chinese: 忠精义
Transcriptions
Standard Mandarin
- Hanyu Pinyin: Zhōngjīngyì
- Wade–Giles: Chung^{1}-ching^{1}-i^{4}
Yue: Cantonese
- Yale Romanization: Jūng jīng yih
- Jyutping: Zung^{1} Zing^{1} Ji^{6}

The Joe Boys, or JBS (also known as Chung Ching Yee, Chinese: 忠精義), was a Chinese American youth gang founded in the 1960s in San Francisco's Chinatown. The Joe Boys were originally known as Joe Fong Boys, after its founder Joe Fong, a former member of the Wah Ching. Most of their members were born in Hong Kong or were of Hong Kongese descent.

== History ==
The {American-born Chinese} called us FOBs—Fresh Off the Boat—or China Bugs. Even the American-born Chinese referred to us as 'Chinese'—as though they were not.

— Joe Fong, quoted by Bill Cardoso, 1977

Joe Fong emigrated to San Francisco from Macau with his family in 1963, when he was eight years old. The Wah Ching were a youth gang formed in Chinatown in 1964 to protect newly arrived immigrants from China against bullying by Chinese-Americans who had been born and raised in America. In the wake of the Immigration and Nationality Act of 1965, the Wah Ching recruited many new members. Initially, the Wah Ching advocated for protection for new immigrants to their elders in the Chinese Consolidated Benevolent Association, but they were rebuffed.

Instead, the Wah Ching developed into a street gang: some members were hired to serve first as lookouts, then as protection for illegal gambling parlors in Chinatown; as they gained experience with gambling operations, they began demanding a cut of the profits. In addition, existing Chinatown leadership, with ties to the Kuomintang in Taiwan, were staunchly anti-Communist and would pay the youth gangs to break up Red Guard rallies and beat them.

By approximately 1968, the Wah Ching were absorbed into the Hop Sing Tong, or, as Bill Cardoso reported, the Hop Sing began using the Wah Ching name for their youth organization. The Yau Lai (also known as the Yo Le or Yau Lay, meaning "good fortune") split from the Wah Ching in 1969, founded by members unhappy with the gang's merger into the Hop Sing, which was then one of the two prominent traditional gangs in Chinatown. Their rivals, the Suey Sing Tong, extended their fight to the Wah Ching. In March 1970, Joe Fong's older brother Glen was gunned down by the Suey Sing. In retaliation, Wah Ching members beat the Suey Sing leader Tom Tom so badly he was hospitalized; the Suey Sing made peace and moved to Oakland. Undaunted, Joe Fong pressed the fight and would often venture to the East Bay to beat Suey Sing members, and in spring 1971, Fong was sentenced to six months in a reformatory for his continued violence.

Joe Fong's group had splintered from the main Yau Lai in early 1971, and claimed to be independent of any existing Chinatown organizations. After Fong was sent to the reformatory, his splinter group was re-absorbed into the Yau Lai; upon his return, he broke a group off again with a trusted lieutenant, Raymond Leung, on October 1. Leung was shot and killed the next day. Joe Fong moved his operations to the Richmond District on the western edge of San Francisco and renamed his group the Chung Ching Yee (after the heroes of the Water Margin) in early 1972. Fong attempted to meet with San Francisco Mayor Joseph Alioto in September to either provide inside information about criminal activity in Chinatown or to draw attention to police corruption and missing social programs; the meeting was rejected, police raided Fong's headquarters that night, and the Joe Boys were harassed by the rival Wah Ching and police.

By 1973, the struggle between the Chung Ching Yee and the Wah Ching had erupted into a war that had claimed 13 lives since 1969; Joe Fong had been arrested on October 2, 1972, and began serving a life sentence for an attempted murder on February 4, 1973. After Fong was jailed, the Chung Ching Yee eventually became the Joe Fong Boys, and then simply the Joe Boys.

An escalating series of retaliation and murder between the Joe Boys and Wah Ching culminated in the Golden Dragon Massacre of September 1977, which occurred as a direct result of an ambush during the sale of firecrackers in Chinatown's Ping Yuen public housing complex on July 4 that left Felix "Tiger" Huey (a Joe Boy) dead. The Joe Boys were targeting Wah Ching leadership, who were present that night at the Golden Dragon; the massacre left 5 people dead, and 11 others injured, but none of them were gang members. The perpetrators were arrested in 1978, convicted, and sentenced to prison.

After the Golden Dragon Massacre, the Wah Ching were ascendant in Chinatown and the Joe Boys were largely shut down under pressure from the San Francisco Police Asian gang task force, which was formed as a direct result of the events at the Golden Dragon.

Murder victims of the Wah Ching–Joe Boys War
Victim			Date	Perpetrator		Location	Notes	Ref.
Name	Age	Gang	Date	Name	Gang	Location	Notes	Ref.
Armado Legardo	29	?	April 1969	?	?	Washington & Grant		
Glen Fong	19	Wah Ching	March 1, 1970	?	Suey Sing	927 Jackson	Older brother of Joe Fong	
Teddy Tam	19	Yau Lai	June 13, 1970	?	?	633 O'Farrell	Stabbed during a CCSF dance	
Larry Miyata	16	?	September 9, 1970	?	?	727 Washington		
Richard Leung	18	Yau Lai	October 2, 1971	Danny Wong	Wah Ching	Grant & Jackson	aka Raymond Leung, a top lieutenant of Yau Lai	
George Yun	21	Yau Lai	November 5, 1971	?	Suey Sing	Presidio	Strangled and hogtied	
Kenneth Chan	15	?	November 7, 1971	?	?	8th & Geary	Drive-by shooting	
Allen Hom	22	Yau Lai	November 19, 1971	?	Suey Sing	San Francisco Bay (near Hayward)	aka "The Monster". Strangled and hogtied, same rope as Lee.	
James Lee	22	Yau Lai	November 20, 1971	?	Suey Sing	SF Bay (near Redwood City)	Strangled and hogtied, same rope as Hom.	
Harry Quan	14	Wah Ching	March 9, 1972	David Wong	Chung Ching Yee	851 Stockton	aka Harry Kwan. shot in front of the Police Athletic League.	
Harry Ng	60	Wah Ching	March 13, 1972	David Wong	Chung Ching Yee	1230 Powell	aka "The Professor". Called the "Fagin" of the Chinese underworld, served as Wah Ching mentor.	
Poole Leong	22	Wah Ching	June 14, 1972	Richard Lee	Joe Boys	895 Pacific	aka Poole Yit Leong	
Barry Fong-Torres	29	–	June 26, 1972	?	?	1434 16th Ave	Brother of Ben Fong-Torres. Youth worker who reputedly "knew too much", according to police.	
William Hackney	41	None	March 23, 1973	?	?	Geary & Arguello	Probable innocent victim.	
Anton Wong	24	Wah Ching	May 24, 1973	Chung Wai Fong	Joe Boys	Powell & Jackson	Wong was the leader of the Wah Ching; Fong was the younger brother of Joe Fong.	
Yip Yee Tak	32	?	June 3, 1973	?	?	Pacific & Grant	Chol Soo Lee was initially convicted for the murder of Tak, an advisor.	
Wayne Fung	19	Wah Ching	August 12, 1973	?	Joe Boys	19th & Irving		
William N. Hoo	40	Joe Boys	August 17, 1973	?	Wah Ching	Auburn Alley	Advisor to Joe Boys.	
Gene Fong	26	Chung Ching Yee	April 29, 1974	?	Wah Ching	Stockton & Pacific	Older brother of Joe Fong	
Lincoln Louie	15	Joe Boys	May 4, 1974	Michael "Hot Dog" Louie	Wah Ching	Crocker & Bellevue, Daly City	8 arrested for torture-murder, including Michael "Hot Dog" Louie	
Kin Chuen Louie	20	Wah Ching	May 31, 1977	?	?	Green & Kearny	Michael McClure wrote a poem entitled The Death of Kin Chuen Louie	
Felix Huie	17	Joe Boys	July 4, 1977	?	?	Ping Yuen	aka "Tiger"; shot during fireworks sales at Ping Yuen	
Michael Lee	18	Joe Boys	September 11, 1977	?	?	Richmond District		

== Identification ==
The gang can also be identified by its numbers 1028, J=10, B=2, S=8. They adopted grey and black as their main colors for clothing. They may use the color navy blue.

== Prominent members ==
Author Bill Lee, an author and a former gang affiliate, wrote extensively of the life involvement in the Chinese criminal underworld and the gang's history in his book Chinese Playground: A Memoir.
