= Asian Boyz =

Gang founded in Long Beach

- Founded: Late 1980s
- Founding location: Long Beach, California, United States
- Years active: Late 1980s–present
- Territory: 14 U.S. states
- Ethnicity: Cambodian American, Vietnamese American; Filipino American; Burmese American
- Activities: Drug trafficking, robbery, assault, burglary, theft, and homicide
- Allies: Crips; Menace of Destruction
- Rivals: Bloods; East Side Longos; Smiley Dragon; Tiny Rascal Gang; Crazy Brother Clan; Vietnamese Boyz; Wah Ching

The Asian Boyz, also known as ABZ, AB-26, or ABZ Crips, are a street gang based in Southern California. They were founded in the late 1980s to protect Cambodian refugees from other American gangs. The gang has about 2,000 to 5,000 active members in Long Beach, who are Southeast Asian, predominantly Cambodian. Many Asian Boyz are also members of the U.S. military, some of whom use their position to traffic drugs. According to the FBI's 2009 National Gang Threat Assessment, the Asian Boyz are active in 28 different cities in 14 different states across the U.S.

== History ==
The first Asian Boyz gang was formed in Long Beach, California in the late 1980s, drawing members from immigrant communities from Southeast Asia. The founders of Long Beach Asian Boyz were originally Cambodian refugees who the East Side Longos were harassing during the 1980s. Controversy lies mostly around the official origin of the gang, as it was a unification of multiple gangs or founding gangsters rather than the formation of one. Their identity also attracts notable controversy, being that the Cambodian sets are notoriously influential and decorated as their faction of Crips that is, among other things, racially or ethnically distinct.

During the mid-1980s in Long Beach, a group of Cambodian refugees formed the Tiny Rascal Gang to defend themselves from the East Side Longos. In the late 1980s, an internal dispute happened within the Tiny Rascal Gang, and members left to form the Long Beach Asian Boyz. The Long Beach Asian Boyz subset would be the first of many.

One of the Asian gang that integrated with Long Beach Asian Boyz during the early 1990s was the Asian Boys Insanity (ABI). Asian Boys Insanity was an independent gang that operated in Chinatown Los Angeles and parts of San Gabriel Valley in the late-1980s. Asian Boy's Insanity was predominately Chinese and Vietnamese. The victim of the infamous pool hall shooting in El Monte in 1993 was Lea Mek, who was a member of the Asian Boys Insanity. After Asian Boys Insanity merged with Long Beach Asian Boyz, Asian Boys Insanity formed Monterey Park Asian Boyz sometime the early-1990s. Then later in the mid-1990s, both Asian Boys Insanity and Monterey Park Asian Boyz (MP ABZ) became what is now known as West Side Asian Boyz (WS ABZ).

Another Asian gang that integrated with Long Beach Asian Boyz was called Van Nuys Asian Boys or Asian Boy Style (ABS), which hailed from Van Nuys. The Asian Boy Style gang was formed in the late 1980s by Sothi "Playa One" Menh, the Mercado brothers, and others. Asian Boy Style established itself in the Valerio Garden apartments and had members spread out in other parts of Los Angeles County. By the mid-1990s, Van Nuys Asian Boy Style merged with Van Nuys Asian Boyz (a branch of Long Beach Asian Boyz) and became one gang.

A notable difference emerged within the Asian Boyz organization, with the S and Z sides sparring. The S side was composed predominantly of ethnic Vietnamese, whereas, the Z side was composed predominantly of Cambodians. Most notably, that ethnic difference created a rift from within the organization that remains.

=== Notable crimes ===
In 1990–1991, Pierre Mercado was responsible for four murders, in an attempt to intimidate other gangs. He fled to the Philippines and remained there for 11 years until he was extradited to the United States in 2012. In 2013, Mercado was sentenced to 218 years to life in prison.

In August 1997, the leader of the Asian Boyz Van Nuys set, Sothi Menh, was arrested in Phnom Penh, Cambodia and extradited to the United States after fleeing the country in the preceding January. He was wanted for committing five gang-related murders in the San Fernando Valley in 1995. In September 1998, Asian Boyz members were charged with three murders and five attempted murders.

In 1996, 17-year-old Sophal Phon, herded the parents of three children into their bathroom and shot them in the head in south-central Kentucky. They were found dead hours later along with their 12-year-old daughter, who was also shot in the head yet survived. Phon was a member of Asian Boyz and was sentenced to life in prison without the possibility of parole.

On August 12, 2006, a fight broke out between Asian Bloods and ABZ gang members at a house in Lowell, Massachusetts, where a birthday party was being held. Asian Boyz members left the party and allegedly started throwing bottles and other objects. Billeoum Phan, aged 14, began firing at the Asian Boyz members. One of the shots hit Asian Boyz member Samnang Oth, killing him. Phan was convicted of manslaughter and sentenced to incarceration until the age of 21, with an additional requirement to serve a 5-year probation after his release.

In December 2006, three members of the gang were charged with beating a 15-year-old boy named Chino Vu to death in Utica, New York. Richie Nguyen, aged 16, was sentenced to 5 to 15 years of prison for manslaughter. Samnang Chou was sentenced to 10 years of prison for second-degree assault.

In March 2008, four men followed 24-year-old Vutha Au from Santa Rosa and stopped at a gas station near Jenner, California, where they fatally shot him in public. The shooter was Quentin Russell, who was 24 years old at the time. Alongside him, Sarith Prak, David Prak, and Preston Khaoone were charged in connection with the murder. All four defendants were convicted and sentenced to life in prison without parole on July 27, 2012.

In March 2011, founder Marvin Mercado was sentenced to life imprisonment for his mid 1990s murder of eight people.

The Reccless Tigers originated in Fairfax County, Virginia and expanded statewide in 2011. They sold thousands of pounds of marijuana, cocaine, ecstasy and prescription drugs throughout Northern Virginia. The group is affiliated with the West Side Asian Boyz gang and high-ranking members have recently been arrested for murder.

In December 2018, a high-ranking member named Derek Pires was arrested in Fall River, Massachusetts following a shooting that left no injuries.

Gang activity involving the ABZ gang and a rival Sureno gang has occurred in Monterey Park, California, in 2019, although it resulted in no life-threatening injuries or death. This set has more Chinese American and Vietnamese members.

== Membership ==
According to the FBI's 2009 National Gang Threat Assessment, membership is estimated at 5,000-10,000 members. Originally, most members were Cambodian, with a small portion of other Southeast Asian members. In the 1980s, the Asian Boyz expanded across the United States. Many factions remained in California, where they are still concentrated. Other factions spread throughout the Midwest and into New England. Factions have their own regional differences, which may include distinctions in culture, identity, structure and ethnic exclusivity.

On the West Coast, the Asian Boyz gang colors are blue and navy. These colors are similar to the Crips who the Asian Boyz learned from and were heavily influenced by. While their speech and mannerisms are similar to those of Crips, they are known to dress in the fashion of West Coast trends, dated to the 1980s and 1990s. Younger members are known to dress along with current fashion trends.

In the Midwest and on the East Coast, along with blue and navy, the gang also wears forest green, black, and white. Their style of dress leans more towards hip-hop casual. In the Midwest, members are known to be of Hmong, Burmese, Karen and Karenni descent while on the East Coast, from Virginia to Georgia, there are a lot more members of Korean and Chinese descent. In Utica, there are many members of Karen descent. Many Cambodians, Vietnamese Americans, and Laotians in Massachusetts. Asian Boyz gang tattoos include a dragon head with crystal globes, a symbol of high rank and original Status. Also common are Sak Yant tattoos that are intended to offer power, protection, fortune, charisma and other benefits for the bearer.

They are also known to have members in Indianapolis and Fort Wayne, Indiana, as well as Minnesota, Omaha, New York, Texas, and Massachusetts. Additionally, the gang is known to have members within the U.S. Armed Forces.

== Rivalries ==
Many members of the Asian Boyz have been in a long conflict with the Wah Ching gang. One of the first shootouts between the two gangs occurred in December 1993 in an El Monte pool hall. An Asian Boyz gang member, Lea Mek, was killed by Wah Ching gang member Chieu Luong Yang.

Another shootout between the two gangs that occurred the same year was in San Marino that caused the deaths of two youths at a San Marino High School graduation party in June. After an investigation by the authorities, police claimed that when the Asian Boyz gang members arrived at the party, they noticed that Wah Ching gang members were there, prompting them to leave and return with weapons. At least nine gang members were arrested, and police seized five weapons from homes searched in conjunction with the arrests. The shootouts between the two gangs were called "Summer Madness" by the Asian Boyz gang.
