= Tokyo Boyz =

- Founded: 1942
- Founding location: Manzanar, California, United States
- Years active: 1942–1996
- Territory: Manzanar, and in later years, San Francisco, California
- Ethnicity: Japanese Americans
- Membership: ~200 During Internment, over 500 post Internment
- Criminal activities: gambling, illegal drug trade, contract killing
- Allies: Jackson-Side Wah Ching

The Tokyo Boyz were a Japanese-American gang founded in Manzanar Concentration camp during World War II. They were split into three groups: the Kibei Boys (Japanese-Americans from Japan), Issei Boys (first-generation Japanese-Americans), and the Nisei Boys (second-generation Japanese-Americans).

== History ==
During World War II, American president Franklin D. Roosevelt passed Executive Order 9066 which provided for the forceful relocation of Japanese and Japanese-Americans into concentration camps. Among these camps was Manzanar, where over 100,000 Japanese Americans were interned. At the camp, a group of rebellious Japanese youths and adults quickly formed a gang. At first there was a power struggle between other gangs in the camp, but after the Manzanar Riots, almost all gangs united into the Tokyo Boyz.

Throughout the lifetime of the camp, The Tokyo Boys were not involved in high-level crimes, but rather trivial offenses such as stealing extra rations and harassing non-Japanese prisoners.

== Post-Manzanar history ==
After the Japanese-Americans were released from Manzanar, many went to California to work legally and reintegrate into American society. However, many Japanese Americans were unable to find work. Many Japanese-Americans to this day remain under the poverty line in places along the West Coast. Due to their socio-economic position, many members of the Tokyo Boys continued their lifestyle of crime after their release.
