= Peter Chong (criminal) =

Hong Kong mob boss (born 1943)

- Born: 1943 (age 82–83); Vietnam
- Other name: "Uncle" Chong
- Occupation: leader of the Wo Hop To syndicate
- Criminal charges: racketeering, murder-for-hire, extortion, and arson

Peter Chong (Chinese: 莊炳強; pinyin: Zhuāng Bǐngqiáng, aka "Uncle" Chong, born in 1943) is an organized crime figure previously convicted of racketeering and extortion who has been described by prosecutors as the former leader of the Wo Hop To syndicate in the late 1980s and early 1990s.

== Criminal activities ==
Chong came to the U.S. from Hong Kong in 1982, ostensibly to start a Chinese opera company, but was accused in court documents of becoming the boss of the Wo Hop To (和合圖) crime syndicate in northern California, a gang involved in loan sharking and extorting protection money from restaurants and gambling dens. Witnesses testified that Chong declared he controlled Chinatown. A US Senate report in December 1992 stated "the Wo Hop To is now in control of virtually all Asian organized crime in the Bay Area."

Chong sent an underling, Dai Kung Luu, to Boston to establish a foothold on the East Coast in 1991. This was a first step in an effort to form an umbrella organization called Tien Ha Wui ("Whole Earth Association") that would dominate crime in Chinatowns throughout the U.S. After the underling was killed in the Boston Chinatown massacre, prosecutors alleged that Chong along with Wayne Kwong and Raymond "Shrimp Boy" Chow were behind a failed plot to murder Boston Chinese underground leader Bike Ming. Chong, Chow and seventeen others were indicted on forty-eight counts of racketeering in 1993. Chong had already left for Hong Kong before his indictment, following an arrest in 1992 on unrelated gambling charges; although he was arrested in Macau in October 1992, he was released two months later, with local authorities stating the 1993 indictment did not provide adequate evidence that Chong was the mastermind. The indictment was amended in 1995, and Chong was arrested in Hong Kong in 1998. After exhausting his appeals, Chong was extradited to the U.S. in 2000.

== Arrests, convictions, and appeals ==
In 2002, Chong was found guilty of racketeering, murder-for-hire, extortion, and arson, and was sentenced to 15 years and eight months in prison. The prosecution was aided by the testimony of Chong's former lieutenant Raymond "Shrimp Boy" Chow.

The murder for hire conviction was overturned in 2005 by the Ninth U.S. Circuit Court of Appeals due to a lack of monetary payment to the killers, evidence of proof of involvement was taken to support additional prison time for the racketeering charge. He was thus sentenced to 11 and a half years on the remaining charges. In a separate memorandum, the 9th Circuit upheld the extortion conviction and sufficiency of evidence presented during his trial.

Chong was released from prison on July 29, 2008.

== See also ==
- List of crime bosses convicted in the 21st century
