= Bill Lee (author) =

American writer (born 1954)

- Born: William Lee; October 7, 1954 (age 71); San Francisco, California
- Education: San Francisco State University
- Occupation: Author
- Employer(s): Bill Lee & co.
- Known for: Ex-Joe Boy member, ex-ESL employee
- Spouse: Kathy Lee (m. 1981–1982)
- Children: 1
- Website: Official Website

William Lee (born October 8, 1954) is an American writer. He is the author of three books. He is a former member of the San Francisco Chinatown gang that was responsible for the 1977 Golden Dragon massacre.

== Biography ==
Lee grew up in San Francisco's Chinatown, and went to Marina Middle School, Galileo High School and was a student majoring in psychology at San Francisco State University when he joined the Chung Ching Yee, also known as the Joe Boys.

Although not indicted, he was questioned by homicide investigators about the 1977 Golden Dragon massacre. The massacre was one of the deadliest in San Francisco History, for which five other Joe Boys were jailed after injuring 15 people and killing 5 others. In 1988, Lee was an employee at ESL when former employee Richard Farley fatally shot seven people and wounded four others in a mass shooting at its headquarters. Lee recalled the tragedy in detail and his role in rescuing coworkers in his first book, Chinese Playground: A Memoir. Announcement of the book's publication was featured on the front page of The San Francisco Examiner and as the cover story in AsianWeek. Shortly after Chinese Playground was released, the author and Sergeant Dan Foley of the SFPD's Asian Gang Task Force appeared on KPIX's Bay Sunday (CBS affiliate) where they discussed the book and the Golden Dragon massacre.

== Career ==
Lee is the author of three books. His first, Chinese Playground: A Memoir (1999) is a memoir of gang life in 1960s and 1970s San Francisco Chinatown which caused him to be approached and threatened by former gang associates who told him he should not have written the book and made veiled threats against him and his family. He is also the author of Born to Lose: Memoirs of a Compulsive Gambler, (2005) which details his 40-year gambling addiction and recovery. Lee's latest book is Born-Again Buddhist. He has written numerous articles for the San Francisco Chronicle, New York Daily News, and AsianWeek, and has been featured on the History Channel, A&E, Spike, FOX network, PBS, Radio Television Hong Kong, NPR, and in national print publications.

Lee has been retired since 2010. He was the principal of Bill Lee and Associates, a senior management and technical search firm based in California. He has also counseled serious offenders at the Juvenile Justice Center (YGC) and Marin County Juvenile Hall.

== Works ==
- Chinese Playground: a Memoir, 1999 ISBN 978-0-9670023-0-9
- Born to Lose: Memoirs of a Compulsive Gambler, 2005 ISBN 978-1-59285-153-9
- Born-Again Buddhist: My Path to Living Mindfully and Compassionately with Mood Disorders, 2014 ISBN 978-1500126360
