= Murder of Lea Mek =

1993 gang-related killing in California

Lea Mek
- Surveillance camera footage from inside the pool hall moments before the murder
- Born: 1974 or 1975; Cambodia
- Died: December 3, 1993 (aged 18); El Monte, California, U.S.
- Cause of death: Gang shooting

Lea Mek (1974/1975 – December 3, 1993) was a Cambodian refugee living in the United States who was a member of the Asian Boyz street gang. On December 3, 1993, Mek was murdered in a gang shooting by the Wah Ching gang, at a pool hall in El Monte, California. The murder was caught on camera by four surveillance cameras installed within the hall. After his murder, the Asian Boyz declared war on the Wah Ching. As a result, it influenced a number of other gang murders and shootings in the LA area, and created a strong feud between both Asian gangs. Authorities claim the murder inspired a chain reaction of gang violence which led to ten other murders in the LA area.

== Murder ==
On Friday, December 3, 1993, 18-year-old Lea Mek, nicknamed "Kicker", went to a pool hall located in a working-class area in the San Gabriel Valley, in El Monte, California. The pool hall was a hangout spot for the gang he was a part of, the Asian Boyz. Mek carried a .45 caliber pistol with him on the night of the shooting and he had a history of weapons and violence. Not long after his arrival, around twenty members of a rival Asian gang called Wah Ching arrived at the hall. Mek reportedly started "mad-dogging" them, staring the gang members down and boasting in front of them. He allegedly walked around and flashed his pistol on multiple occasions in an effort to intimidate the rival gangsters. Some of the gangsters left, but a number stayed behind as Mek continued to mock them. Mek turned his back momentarily and was then wrestled to the floor by Wah Ching gang member, 19-year-old Chieu Luong Yang (Chinese: 楊丘龍; pinyin: Yáng Qiūlóng), nicknamed "China Dog". Yang wrestled Mek to the floor and he and several other Wah Ching gang members tried to drag Mek outside. Asian Boyz gangsters in the pool hall attempted to help Mek by attacking them with pool cues. One Asian Boyz gangster tried to fire at the Wah Ching with a pistol resting on a pool table, but the gun jammed. Mek was still held down on the floor and his gun was taken from him by Yang. At this point, another Wah Ching gang member entered the hall and opened fire with a pistol, sending people inside the hall running and screaming. People inside the hall took cover behind pool tables, while Mek was dragged outside. Yang peered into the pool hall and opened fire at Asian Boyz gang members with the gun he had stolen from Mek. Mek managed to break free outside and attempted to tackle Yang but failed to do so. He ran into the hall and tried to take cover behind one of the pool tables. Yang however shot at him and followed him into the hall. Mek was shot five times in his body as he took cover behind a pool table. Yang chased after him and fired two shots into Mek's head as he lay on the floor. Yang then fled and Mek died a short time later.

== Aftermath ==
Officer Greg Carroll from the El Monte Police Department was the first to arrive on scene. The hall still smelt of gunpowder and it was silent inside, with people still cowering behind pool tables in shock over the shooting. At the time of the shooting, the hall was filled with around fifty people, some of whom were children. Four hidden surveillance cameras recorded the incident in black and white. The cameras recorded no audio however. Yang was identified as the killer because of the video tapes and was captured at a later date. He was sentenced to life in prison for the murder. He was Paroled in 2020. The other shooter was also captured and sentenced to 10 years in jail on condition he pled guilty to the crime, which he did.

The murder of Mek is a key incident between the Wah Ching and Asian Boyz. It caused even more tension and rivalry between the two gangs. Authorities claim the murder inspired a chain reaction of gang violence which led to ten other murders in the LA area. Six months later, the Asian Boyz carried out a revenge hit by performing a drive-by shooting on the Wah Ching at a San Marino High School graduation party, which led to the deaths of two Asian youths.

== In popular culture ==
Footage of the crime has been shown on documentaries and was broadcast widely in the media at the time of the incident. Footage of the murder has been shown on programs such as Gangland, Anatomy of Crime and Banned from Television. Due to there being no audio, sound effects of gunshots were added to the footage.
