= Golden Dragon massacre =

1977 shooting in San Francisco, California, U.S.

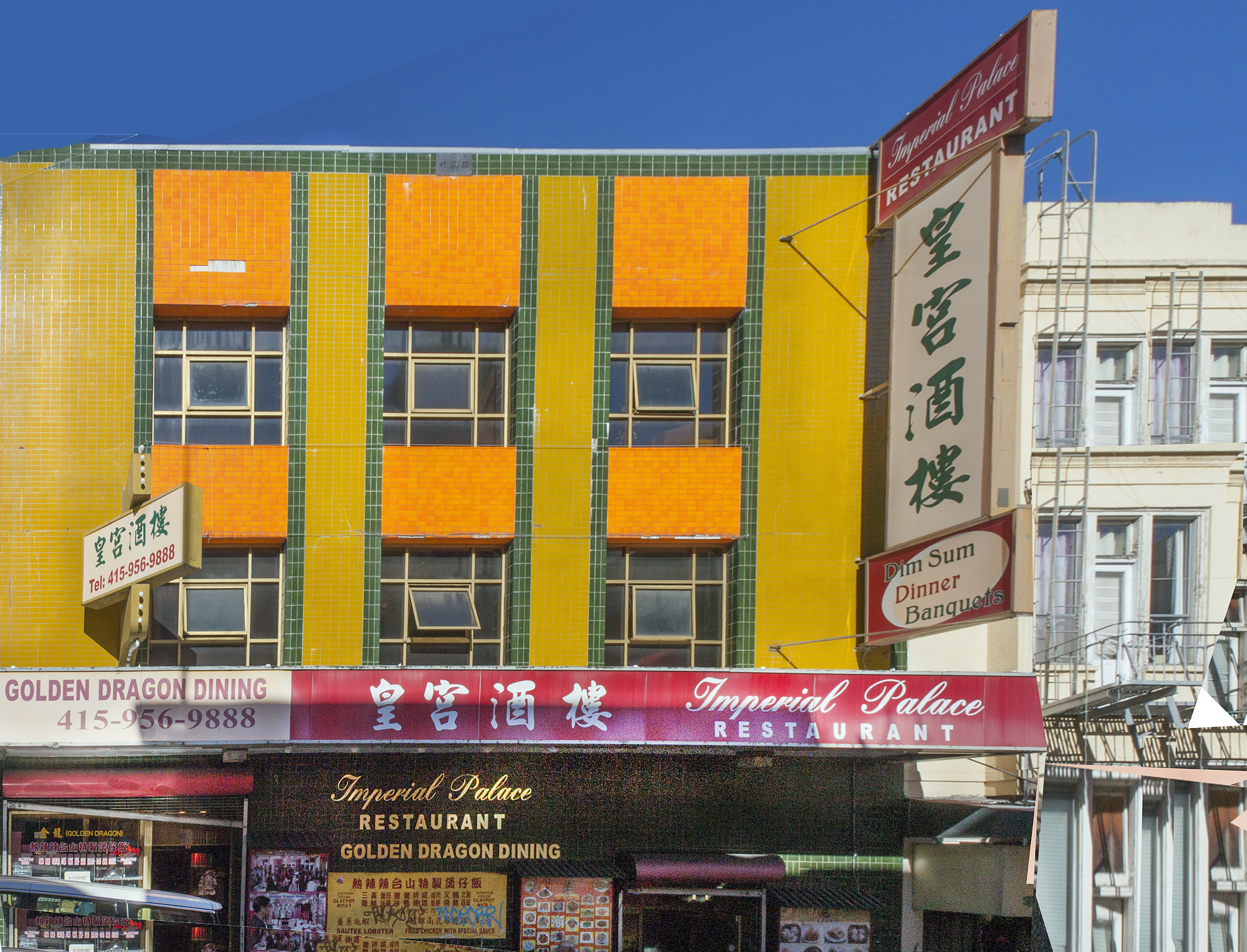
- 2017 photograph of Imperial Palace, which replaced the Golden Dragon in the same space

- Golden Dragon massacre (San Francisco)
- Location: 37°47′43″N 122°24′25″W; 818 Washington Street, San Francisco, California, U.S.
- Date: September 4, 1977; 49 years ago 2:40 a.m. (PST)
- Target: Leaders of the Wah Ching gang
- Attack type: Gang violence, mass murder, mass shooting, shootout
- Weapons: .45-caliber Commando Mark III rifle; Two 12-gauge pump-action shotguns; .38 Special revolver
- Deaths: 5
- Injuries: 11
- Perpetrators: Peter Ng; Curtis Tam; Chester Yu; Melvin Yu; Tom Yu
- Motive: Rivalry between Joe Boys and Wah Ching gangs

A gang-related mass shooting took place on September 4, 1977, inside the Golden Dragon restaurant at 822 Washington Street in Chinatown, San Francisco, California, United States. The shooting was planned and committed by members of the Joe Boys, a Chinese-American youth gang, who were attempting to kill leaders of the Wah Ching, a rival Chinatown gang. The attack left five people dead and 11 others injured, none of whom were gang members. Seven perpetrators were later convicted and sentenced in connection with the murders. The massacre led to the establishment of the San Francisco Police Department's Asian Gang Task Force, credited with ending gang-related violence in Chinatown by 1983. The restaurant closed in 2006.

== Shooting ==
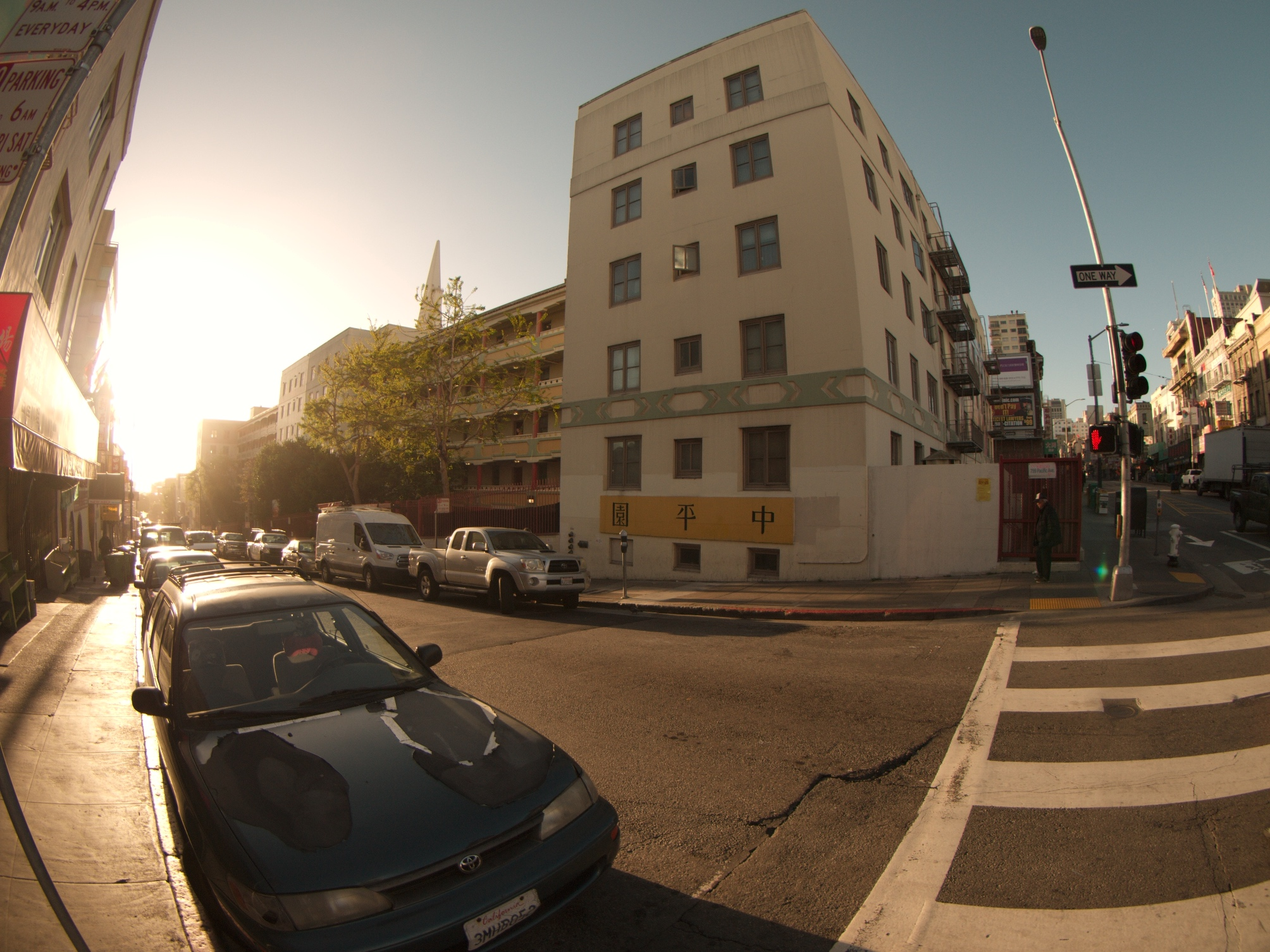
Central Ping Yuen (2018), at the corner of Stockton and Pacific

=== Motivation ===
The incident was motivated by a longstanding feud between two rival Chinatown gangs, the Joe Boys (Chung Ching Yee) and Wah Ching, tracing back to 1969, when the first victim was killed. The two gangs controlled different parts of San Francisco, with the Wah Ching in Chinatown and the Joe Boys in the Richmond and Sunset districts, and had been rivals since the Joe Boys splintered off from the Wah Ching in the late 1960s. The shooting at the Golden Dragon was an attempted assassination of Wah Ching leaders and was a direct retaliation for the shootout with the Wah Ching in Chinatown's Ping Yuen housing project on July 4, 1977, which was sparked by a dispute over fireworks sales. That shootout resulted in the death of 16-year-old Felix Huey (Chinese: 許非力; sometimes romanized as Huie) and the wounding of Melvin Yu, both members of the Joe Boys.

Huey's murder, in turn, was seen as a reprisal for the earlier death of Kin Chuen Louie, a 20-year-old member of the Wah Ching who had been shot a dozen times on May 31 while attempting to escape in his car. Louie's death was later memorialized in a poem by Michael McClure, who came upon the victim shortly after the shooting. Including those victims in the Golden Dragon, 44 people had been murdered in gang violence in Chinatown by 1977; Inspector John McKenna of the San Francisco Police counted 55 dead between 1969 and 1977.

=== Planning ===
The raid was planned in a Daly City apartment. Preparations began in early 1977 when Joe Boys members began acquiring the weapons that would be used in the shooting; during the summer of 1977, Tom Yu, a leader of the Joe Boys, convinced a longtime friend who owned a home in Pacifica to store the weapons, wrapped in cloth, in the front closet of that home. On August 29, 1977, Yu met with Carlos Jon, a member of another gang. Yu asked Jon to keep track of Wah Ching and allied Hop Sing Tong gang members over the upcoming Labor Day weekend, showing special interest in where they gathered late at night. The conspirators decided to target the Golden Dragon (Chinese: 三藩市華埠金龍大酒樓) because it was a favorite hangout of both the Wah Ching and Hop Sing Tong. The planned raid would also financially damage Jack Lee, a Hop Sing elder who co-owned the restaurant.

Yu gave Jon the phone number of the Pacifica home and asked him to call on the following Saturday, September 3. That Friday night, September 2, members of the Joe Boys gathered in Pacifica, retrieved the weapons and put them on display. Yu received a phone call at 1:00 a.m. on Saturday morning, and after a brief, private conversation, ordered the weapons to be put back into the closet. By this time, the group plotting the shooting consisted of Tom Yu, his brothers Chester and Dana, Melvin Yu (no relation), Peter Ng, Peter Cheung, Curtis Tam, Kam Lee, and Don Wong.

Golden Dragon restaurant on the north side of Washington (facing west from Grant), c. October 2000. Photographed by Carol Highsmith.

Later that evening, the gang returned to Pacifica. Around 9:30 p.m., two members of the Joe Boys, Peter Cheung and Dana Yu, were asked to steal a four-door car, which would facilitate entry and exit for a quick getaway; they returned shortly afterward with a blue Dodge Dart and parked it in the home's driveway. The gang members retrieved the guns from the closet after the homeowners returned and went to sleep. At 2:00 a.m., Pacific Daylight Time on Sunday, September 4, Tom Yu received a phone call from Carlos Jon that members of the rival Wah Ching gang, including Michael "Hot Dog" Louie, one of its leaders, were present at the Golden Dragon restaurant in San Francisco's Chinatown.

Chester Yu drove a group of four Joe Boys (himself, Curtis Tam, Melvin Yu, and Peter Ng) to the Golden Dragon using the stolen Dodge. Forty minutes later, at 2:40 a.m., Chester Yu parked the stolen car near the Golden Dragon and stayed in the driver's seat while the others went to the restaurant. Armed with a .45-caliber Commando Mark III rifle (a modern clone of the Thompson submachine gun), two 12 gauge pump-action shotguns, and a .38-caliber revolver, the other three donned nylon stocking masks and entered the restaurant from the second entrance at 818 Washington, looking for members of the Wah Ching. During the trial of Curtis Tam, Chester Yu testified that Tam was wielding a shortened shotgun, Ng had a long-barreled shotgun and a handgun, and Melvin Yu was using the rifle. A crowd estimated at between 50 and more than 100 people, many of whom were tourists, were present at the restaurant at the time of the shooting.

=== At the Golden Dragon ===
According to Chester Yu, Ng had instructed Tam to fire a shot at the ceiling first so that "when the people panic and get down on the floor, we will decide who to shoot." Instead, without warning, the three randomly opened fire on the patrons inside the crowded restaurant, killing five people, including two tourists, and wounding 11 others, none of whom were gang members. In Tam's confession, he stated he had been forced to join the shooting and deliberately did not target any patrons; after he "heard Melvin start shooting, then Peter. I fired my first shot at the sofa. The second I aimed where nobody was." Testimony at Melvin Yu's trial showed he was the first to open fire, using the rifle.

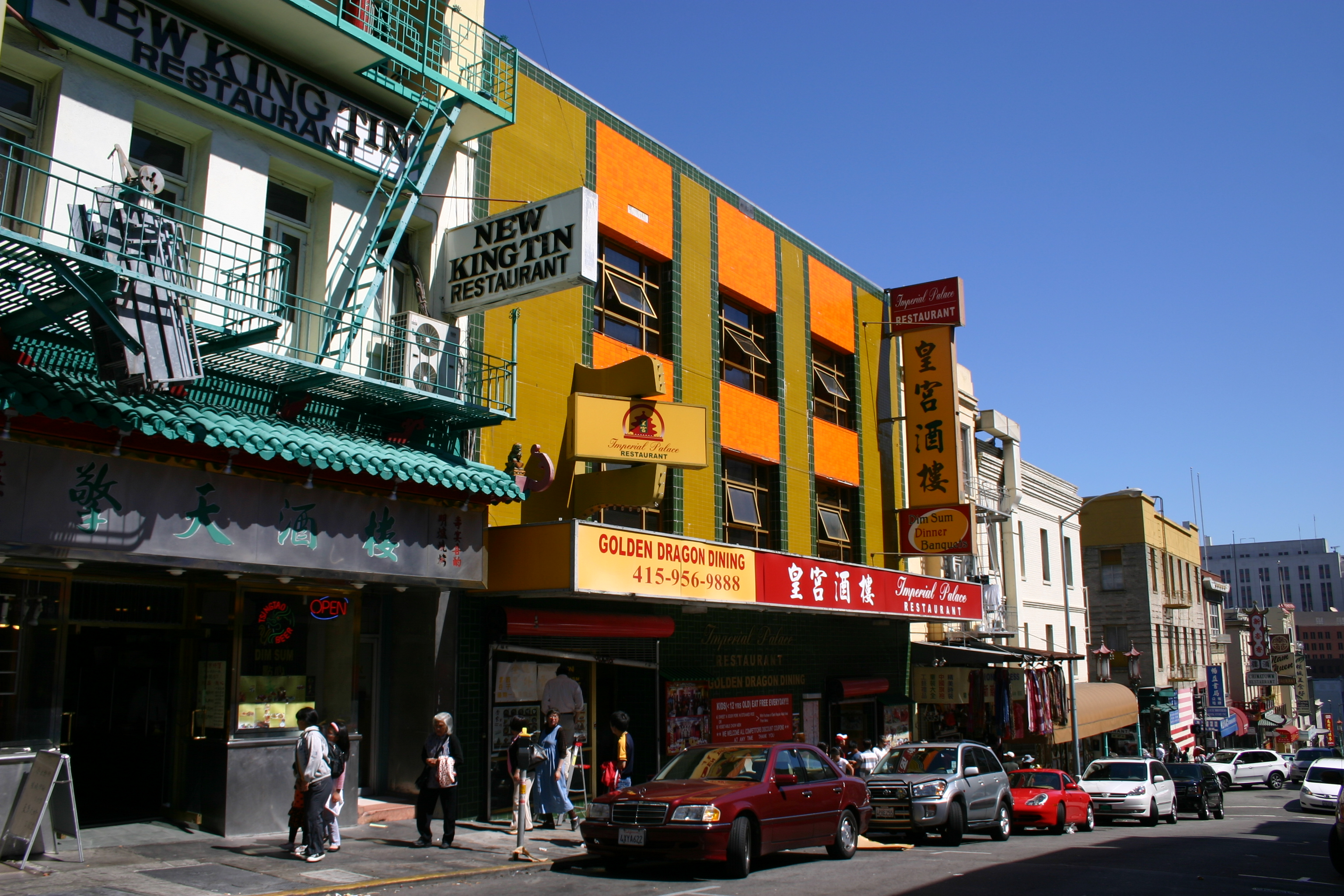
Day (2010)

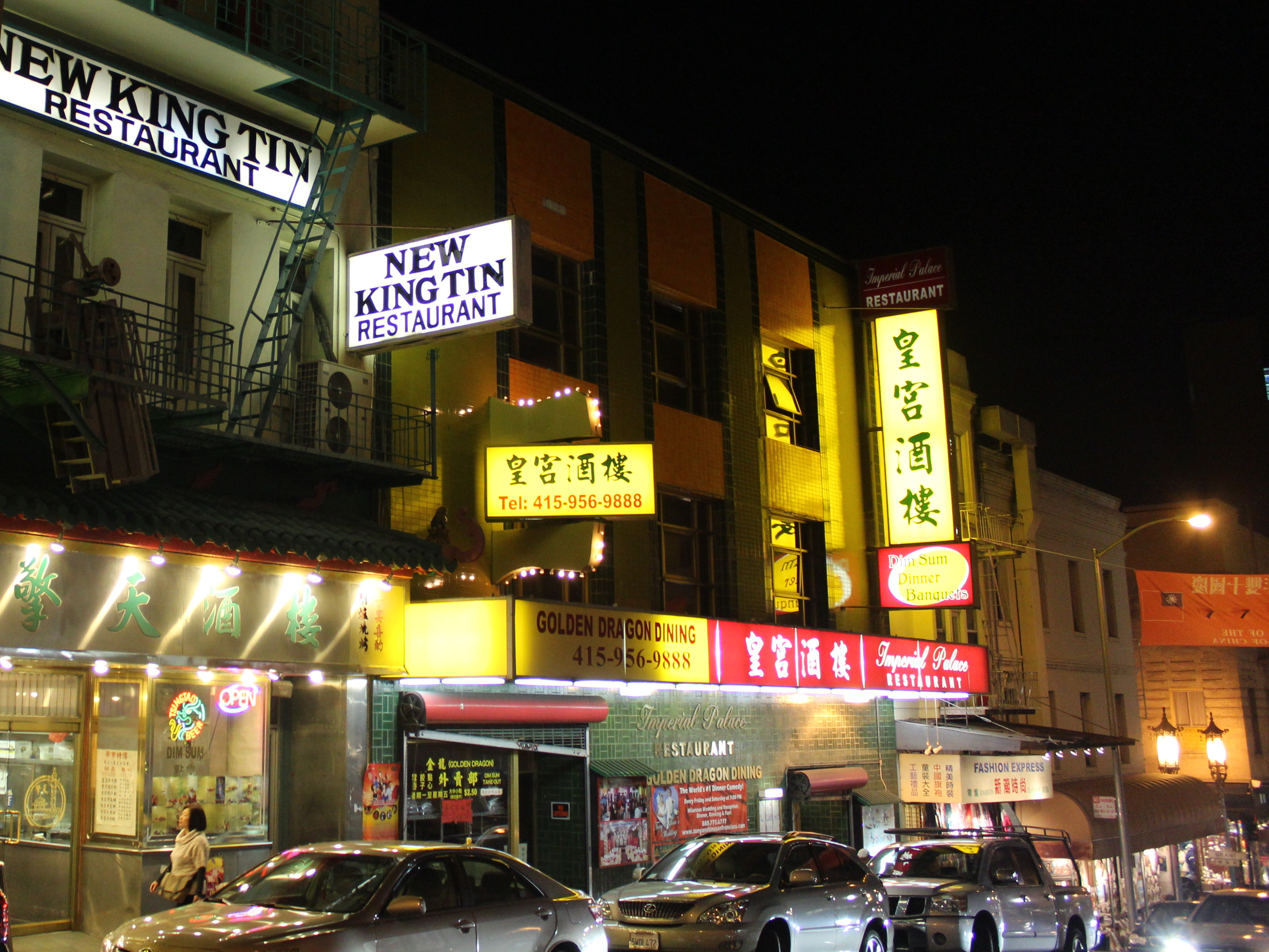
Night (2011)

The Golden Dragon (now Imperial Palace) is near the intersection of Washington Street and Waverly Place.

Melvin Yu walked directly up to a man at a table and shot him nine times, continuing to shoot after that victim had fallen to the floor. Melvin Yu then redirected his automatic rifle and shot randomly into the crowd, accompanied by two shotgun blasts from the other gunmen. The first victim, later identified as Paul Wada, a visiting law student, may have been misidentified as a gang sympathizer. An initial news report incorrectly identified some shooting victims as "highly placed" gang members.

The intended targets, the leadership of the Wah Ching and Hop Sing, were sitting at a table at the back of the restaurant. They were not injured in the shooting. Up to 10 members of the Wah Ching, including their leader, Michael Louie, ducked under tables during the gunfire. They had been alerted by a friend who spotted the three gunmen running toward the restaurant from a front-facing window and shouted "Man with a gun!" in Cantonese and English. Triad member Raymond Kwok Chow, then 17 years old and a member of the allied Hop Sing Tong, who would later achieve considerable notoriety, was among those who survived the attack.

The shooting lasted less than 60 seconds. Police later called it the worst mass murder in San Francisco history.

Comedians Philip Proctor and Peter Bergman of the Firesign Theatre were eating at the Golden Dragon during the shooting, after performing a Proctor and Bergman show at the Great American Music Hall. When Bergman, an Army veteran, realized the perpetrators had emptied their weapons, he rose from cover in time to see their faces as they exited. He later testified in their conviction.

Two off-duty armed police officers were also dining at the Golden Dragon during the attack. James Bonanno, a restaurant patrolman, dove for cover when the gunmen entered; he later testified that he pulled his revolver and radioed for help while hiding. Once the shooting stopped, after 30 to 45 seconds, he emerged and began to help the wounded diners. Richard Hargens (or Harkins) also fell to the floor after hearing shots and though he drew his revolver, he stated other people were in his line of fire and he was unable to shoot the gunmen. Neither officer was able to identify the gunmen beyond describing them as "young Orientals".

=== Cleaning up ===
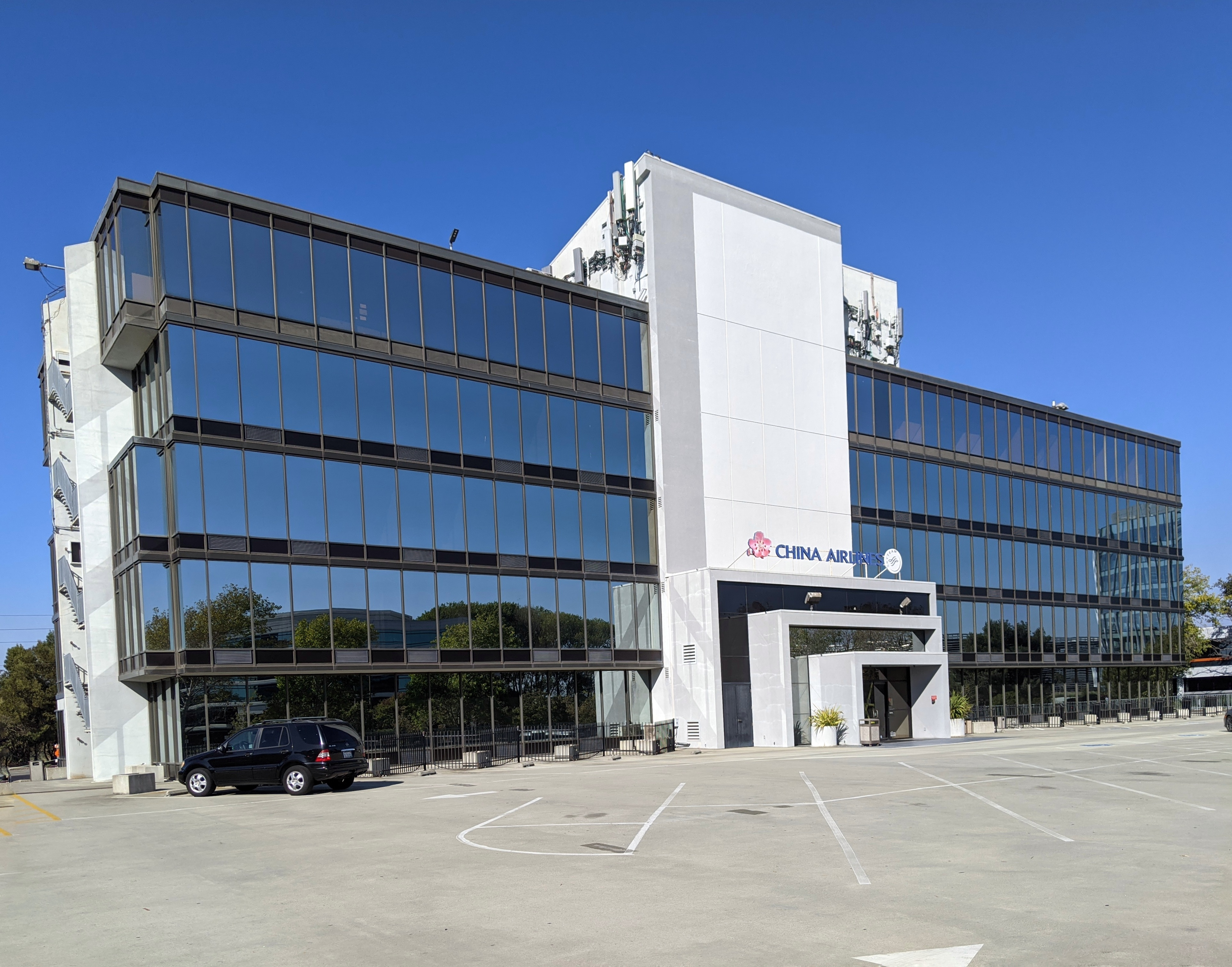
433 Airport Blvd, site of Kee Joon's in Burlingame

Chester Yu drove the shooters back to the house in Pacifica after the shooting, and the weapons were returned to the closet. After their return, the Joe Boys stayed awake until dawn discussing the shooting, then slept for a few hours before awakening to listen to the news of the killing. They dispatched Tony Chun-Ho Szeto, another Joe Boy, to pick up noodles from the Golden Dragon for breakfast. Later that morning, the perpetrators retrieved the weapons from the closet, cut them into pieces in the garage, and asked Szeto to dump the pieces into San Francisco Bay. Szeto drove Chester Yu to a location within sight of Kee Joon's, a Burlingame restaurant where Szeto worked, and together they dumped the parts into the Bay near San Francisco International Airport. A week after the shooting, Tom Yu called Carlos Jon for the last time, asking Jon to "keep cool."

== Victims ==
The five victims fatally shot at the restaurant were later identified as:

- Calvin M. Fong (方凱文), 18, a graduate of Archbishop Riordan High School
- Donald Kwan (君唐勞), 20, a graduate of Abraham Lincoln High School
- Denise Louie (雷典禮), 21, an urban planning student at the University of Washington
- Paul Wada (和田保羅), 25, a law student at the University of San Francisco
- Fong Wong (黃芳), 48, an immigrant from Hong Kong working as a server at the Golden Dragon

== Aftermath ==
One week after the shooting, two Joe Boys were shot by suspected Wah Ching gunmen, leaving one dead and the other critically wounded, in what police called a revenge-motivated shooting. Michael Lee, 18, was killed, and Lo "Mark" Chan, 19, was wounded critically during the ambush at the entryway of Chan's Richmond district home.

Chinatown, one of the leading tourist destinations in San Francisco, suffered after the shooting. Nighttime dining in Chinatown was depressed, as restaurant reservations were cancelled en masse following the shooting. Although the Golden Dragon reopened just seven hours after the shooting, it closed as early as 10 p.m. in the week following a drop in patronage; normally it would stay open until 3 a.m. Business and tourist traffic remained depressed for several weeks following the shootings, although other businesses stated the rising cost of labor in Chinatown was to blame for increased prices and decreased patronage. By December, business at the Golden Dragon remained down and police had still not made any arrests, although by that time Michael Louie, the reported target that night, had been arrested for his suspected involvement with the 1976 murder of Kit Mun Louie (no relation), an 18-year-old immigrant from Hong Kong.

=== Investigation ===
I was shocked and disgusted that things have gotten this bad that the crazies could come in and wantonly gun down bystanders.

Chinatown has been ignored by the rest of the community for decades. It's a low-income area where the people crowded in are not afforded proper education, health, and housing. It's treated like a ghetto. And like any poor district, it's given low priority by the San Francisco Police Department.

Most of the kids committing the crimes are teenagers. They suffer from a lack of facilities. There are only two playgrounds for 30,000 people. The only football field is one where you skin your elbow on concrete.

Until recently, there were no Chinese cops and only one Chinese fireman. And not many Chinese lawyers.

The Chinese are not different than other people. We are law-abiding, life-is-good-to-us folks. My worry is that a lot of kids are going to get contaminated by these hoodlums.

— Supervisor Gordon J. Lau, 1977 Desert Sun article

The San Francisco Police Department (SFPD) announced they were close to solving the crime soon after the shooting, but Chief Charles Gain criticized the Chinatown community for its silence and "abdication of responsibility" due to "the subculture of fear" of gang reprisals. SFPD Lieutenant Daniel Murphy, head of the investigation, said, "because so many innocent people were killed and injured, this time we have been getting more cooperation out of the residents and witnesses in Chinatown than we normally do." Chinatown residents came forward to provide tips in the days following the shooting, identifying that Wah Ching diners and Joe Boys assailants were present that night.

Chief Gain followed up his earlier criticism by calling gambling in Chinatown "blatant, historic and rampant". Gain later claimed his criticism of gambling in Chinatown was a gambit to anger the community and provoke them into providing more information. Gordon Lew, an editor of the local Chinatown newspaper East-West, in turn, criticized the SFPD for relying on information and cooperation from supposed community leaders linked to the underworld, leading to community distrust of the SFPD, and concluded that "committing suicide is not a virtue among the Chinese". Joe Fong, founder of the Joe Boys, said in an interview from prison that SFPD officers had been paid to protect gambling operations in Chinatown, which Chief Gain disputed, saying that was part of the police culture prior to his ascension as chief.

Mayor George Moscone announced a US$25,000 (equivalent to $133,000 in 2025) reward for information leading to the conviction of the shooters two days after it occurred, the largest reward offered in San Francisco to date. The unprecedented reward was eventually increased to US$100,000 (equivalent to $531,000 in 2025) in late September, the highest reward allowed by city law. The SFPD received the first lead in the case two weeks after the shooting, pointing at Curtis Tam.

However, by December 1977, no arrests had been made, though police were investigating the deadly rivalry between the Joe Boys and Wah Ching. The reward was eventually collected by Gan Wah "Robert" Woo of the Joe Boys. Woo had been arrested in March 1978 for participating in another gang skirmish on February 15 in Portsmouth Square, a shooting that left two Wah Ching members wounded. He gave the police a recording of Tam conversing about the massacre; subsequently, Woo was kept in protective custody after he had been identified as the informant.

=== Arrests ===
Curtis Tam, Melvin Yu, Peter Ng, Chester Yu, and Tom Yu were eventually arrested and convicted; after their arrests, the gunmen were identified as Ng, Melvin Yu, and Tam, all 17 years old at the time of the shooting.

Curtis Tam was the first to be arrested on March 24, 1978. Tam, an emigrant from Hong Kong, was 18 years old and attending Galileo High School at the time of his arrest. A police informant recorded Tam recounting details of the attack, and shortly after his arrest, anonymous sources identified Tam as one of the gunmen. During his initial interrogation, Tam confessed and implicated 11 others. A hearing was held in April 1978 to determine if Tam should be tried as an adult, which was granted. The recording of Tam's interrogation was first played at an arraignment hearing in May 1978 and again at his trial; in it, he claimed, "They made me do it. If I didn't shoot somebody then they'd say, you know, I'm chicken. I don't think I shot anybody 'cause I didn't aim at anybody."

In early April 1978, the Yu brothers (Tom, Chester, and Dana) hired an attorney, George Walker, to make a plea bargain; in turn, their attorney met with the assigned assistant district attorney, Hugh Levine, on April 3 and explained his three unnamed clients were requesting immunity for two brothers (Tom and Dana Yu) in exchange for their testimony against the shooters. Walker described those two brothers as peripherally involved, specifically calling Tom Yu "a peripheral figure who had inadvertently answered a telephone call at the house in Pacifica" which had informed him that members of the Wah Ching and Hop Sing were at the Golden Dragon. The third brother, Chester, admitted to his role as the getaway driver but requested for his proceedings to be held in juvenile court in exchange for his testimony. Levine tentatively agreed to allow the driver to enter the juvenile court and provided immunity to the two brothers, conditioned upon confirmation that they were only peripherally involved in the crime and that their testimony was truthful. Levine met Walker's three clients for the first time on April 19; Dana Yu's request for immunity was granted, and Chester Yu was allowed to enter the juvenile court system. However, since Levine already knew that Tom Yu, as a leader in the Joe Boys, could not have been involved only peripherally, immunity for him was rejected.

The weapons used in the attack were recovered by police divers from San Francisco Bay on April 20, 1978, after Chester Yu showed them where they had been dumped. After Chester mentioned that a "Carlos" had called the house in Pacifica, Carlos Jon became a witness for the prosecution. At a preliminary hearing in May 1978, Tony Szeto described "bungled efforts to dump a bagful of guns". Ballistics tests matched the recovered weapons with bullets taken from those killed.

On April 21, the SFPD announced the arrests of Peter Ng and an unnamed juvenile (later identified as the driver of the getaway car, Chester Yu), and named Melvin Yu as another suspect they were seeking in connection with the massacre. Melvin Yu and Peter Cheung were arrested early on the morning of April 23, 18 miles (29 km) east of Carson City, Nevada. Tom Yu dropped George Walker as his attorney and surrendered to police after the Memorial Day weekend. In all, nine were arrested and scheduled to be tried for their roles in the massacre: Curtis Tam, Peter Ng, Tom Yu, Melvin Yu, Kam Lee, Chester Yu, Tony Szeto, Peter Cheung, and Donald Wong.

=== Trials ===
By August 1978, three youths who were charged with being accessories to the crimes had been found guilty or pleaded guilty in closed juvenile court proceedings.

==== Curtis Tam ====
Tam was scheduled to go on trial on July 31, 1978, but the trial was delayed while a change of venue was being contemplated. Tam's trial began on August 21, and he was convicted on five murder counts and eleven assault counts on September 5, 1978. Attorneys for the defendant made several motions to move the trial venue, sequester the jury, and ban reporters from the courtroom, none of which were granted. During his trial, Tam testified he had deliberately aimed his shotgun away from diners and only participated in the shooting under duress. However, Chester Yu testified that Tam was "very happy" after the shooting and recalled hearing Tam say he "wanted to shoot more people", and Tam was recorded by Robert Woo, threatening the life of a suspected police informant.

Thirteen eyewitnesses were called to testify at Tam's trial, including eight of the eleven wounded; none identified Curtis Tam as one of the gunmen, although the witness who initially spotted the trio running toward the restaurant identified Peter Ng from a police photograph. The prosecutors rested their case against Tam on August 29 after playing a recording of his confession, taken after his arrest on March 24. Attorneys made closing arguments on September 1, and after the Labor Day weekend, the jury reconvened on September 5; after deliberating for just over a day, the jury found Tam guilty of five counts of second degree murder, eleven counts of assault, and several weapons possession charges. Tam faced a sentence of up to 35 years imprisonment, but a defense attorney vowed to appeal the verdict, which he called "a compromise" because he thought "[the jury] considered duress in reducing their finding of intent on Tam's part". The sentencing hearing was set for October 3. Tam received a sentence of 28 years imprisonment. On June 18, 1981, the California Court of Appeals reduced his sentence to 23 years. Tam filed another appeal in August 1981.

==== Melvin Yu ====
After Tam's trial, Tom Yu, Melvin Yu, and Peter Ng stood trial. On September 26, 1978, Melvin Yu was convicted, after four hours of deliberation, of five counts of first-degree murder and 11 counts of assault with a deadly weapon; his attorney offered no defense against the charges, and Melvin Yu did not testify at his trial. He received a life sentence. Melvin Yu was released from Solano State prison in 2015.

==== Peter Ng ====
Peter Ng went on trial on January 8, 1979, in Fresno, and was convicted on February 22 of five counts of first degree murder and eleven counts of assault with a deadly weapon. Jurors deliberated four hours before reaching the verdict.

==== Tom Yu ====
Tom Yu was indicted but moved to dismiss the charges on the basis that he had been granted immunity by Levine; the trial court denied the motion, finding both that he had not satisfied the two imposed conditions, and further, that his proposed testimony was not true. Yu then entered a conditional guilty plea in 1979 on one count of conspiracy to commit second-degree murder and admitted that a firearm was used in the crime. The plea bargain had been extended to Tom Yu on April 25, 1978, modified on May 30, and accepted by Yu on September 1. However, upon reviewing the probation report, which called Tom Yu "the prime mover in the whole thing", the court rejected the plea bargain and restored the original charges. Yu appealed the rejection of the plea bargain since the court had previously ruled it was a binding agreement, although the presiding judge also added the condition that court judgment could be used to set it aside. The trial venue had been moved first to Fresno due to publicity in San Francisco, and then to Santa Barbara since Peter Ng had already been tried and convicted in Fresno. Yu's first trial ended in a hung jury in September 1979. He was later convicted of five counts of first-degree murder, eleven counts of assault by means of force likely to produce great bodily injury, one count of conspiracy to commit murder, and one count of conspiracy to commit assault with a deadly weapon. He was sentenced to life imprisonment in state prison.

=== Release and parole ===
In October 1991, Curtis Tam was released from prison. Tam requested a Certificate of Rehabilitation and Pardon in September 2018; the request was denied in November.

In 2014, Melvin Yu was granted parole; during the parole hearing, he said that he had plans to live with a cousin in Hong Kong and expected to be deported back to there. As of 2017, a spokesperson for the Chinese Consulate of San Francisco stated that there was no record of deportation requests for Yu, and Yu had been living in San Francisco. Yu converted to Christianity approximately ten years after the shooting at the Golden Dragon, and served time at Deuel Vocational Institute, where he took college courses in mathematics.

Tom Yu was eligible for parole in 2017 and was released before September 2018.

Peter Ng was eligible for parole in 2020, after being denied eight times, most recently in 2015. According to state records, he was no longer listed as an inmate in 2018.

=== Long-term results ===
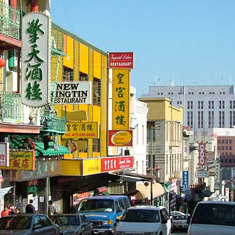
2007 photograph after name changed to "Imperial Palace"

An ex–Joe Boys member, Bill Lee, wrote about the killings and his gang experiences in Chinese Playground: A Memoir. Lee left the gang shortly after the 1977 massacre. He filed a police report over an April 1999 incident during a public reading, in which former peers said he should not have written the book.

The Golden Dragon massacre led to the establishment of the SFPD's Chinatown (later Asian) Gang Task Force, credited with ending gang-related violence in Chinatown by 1983. The Task Force's first credited arrest was for Michael Louie, the reputed 21-year-old leader of the Wah Ching who was one of the targets in the Golden Dragon massacre.

Michael Louie was arrested on December 5, 1977, for the murder of Kit Mun Louie (no relation). Kit Mun was an 18-year-old immigrant from Hong Kong (via Honolulu) who was shot and killed on August 29, 1976. The two had been romantically involved, but he confessed to being angry with her for "whoring around with Joe Boys". He claimed that to frighten her, he put an unloaded gun to her head as she was sleeping and pulled the trigger. Although he had removed the magazine to unload it, the firing chamber was still loaded with a live round and he shot her at point-blank range. Afterward, he scattered pieces of the weapon in San Francisco Bay and dumped her body near Stinson Beach, where it was discovered on January 1, 1977, but not identified until November 1977. Michael Louie pleaded guilty to voluntary manslaughter and possession of a deadly weapon after his arrest, receiving a sentence of 15 years imprisonment in January 1978; he was eligible for parole after four years.

Robert Woo, the informant who collected the $100,000 reward, was killed during a shootout with police while robbing a jewelry shop in Los Angeles on December 19, 1984.

The Golden Dragon restaurant continued operation after the massacre, but patronage was down and it failed a health inspection in September 1978. After failing another health inspection in January 2006, it was closed. The restaurant also owed a year's worth of paychecks to its employees. It was reopened in May 2006 as the Imperial Palace Restaurant.

== See also ==
- 101 California Street shooting, a 1993 mass murder that took place a short distance away in San Francisco's financial district
- Boston Chinatown massacre, a 1991 gang-related mass murder in Boston
- History of Chinese Americans in San Francisco
- List of homicides in California
- List of massacres in the United States
- Wah Mee massacre, a 1983 mass shooting in Seattle
