= Medford Daily Mercury =

Defunct newspaper in Medford, Massachusetts, US

- Type: Daily newspaper
- Format: Broadsheet
- Owner: Tribune Publications Inc.
- Publisher: Daniel J. Horgan
- Editor: Stephen Freker
- Founded: 1880
- Ceased publication: 2017
- Headquarters: 277 Commercial Street, Malden, Massachusetts 02148 United States
- Circulation: 14,000 in 2003 when combined with Malden Evening News
- Price: US$0.50 daily
- Website: MaldenNews.com

The Medford Daily Mercury was an independent five-day (Monday through Friday) daily newspaper covering the city of Medford, Massachusetts.

Publisher Daniel J. Horgan owned the Daily Mercury and its sister paper, the Malden Evening News, since purchasing the Daily News-Mercury in 1996. Although Horgan restored separate titles for Medford and Malden, Massachusetts, on any given day the two newspapers looked almost identical, except for front-page stories.

== History ==
The public face of the Medford Daily Mercury through much of the late 20th century was David Brickman, who became its publisher in 1947, bought the Malden News in 1953 and acquired the Melrose News, a former newspaper in neighboring Melrose, in 1969. Brickman was active in press associations and civic and governmental affairs—he helped campaign for Massachusetts' Open Meeting Law and served on the state Ethics Commission.

Brickman, who was known to Boston-area viewers of the "Starring the Editors" television program as an outspoken regular panelist, called his final years at the helm of the three newspapers "a struggle in an antipathetic atmosphere." He sold his 75 percent interest in the papers for $1 million to Malden businessman and minority shareholder Warren H. Jackson in 1989.

The move kept the paper in local hands, although Brickman had seemed ready to sell to a Rupert Murdoch-owned company, for more money, a year earlier. Reports in 1988 had Murdoch, who at the time owned the Boston Herald and WFXT-TV in nearby Boston, negotiating a price between US$5 million and US$10 million.

At the time of the sale to Jackson, the three papers covered four towns—the Malden News published an edition in Everett, Massachusetts—with a reported combined circulation of 11,300. Jackson announced he would save money by combining the three papers into one edition. This move created the Daily News-Mercury in 1990.

Another of Jackson's cost-cutting measures was the subject of a union picket in 1994. Despite a contract that guaranteed "lifelong employment", he fired the papers' typographers. One union member complained that the Daily News-Mercury had been "in bankruptcy for the last year; they owe us more than US$100,000 in pension money; they haven't given us a raise in eight years".

The underfunded pension later caused the sheriff's office to close the Daily News-Mercury temporarily in June 1995.

In 1996, the Daily News-Mercury was bought for US$650,000 by its current owner, Daniel J. Horgan, a publisher of weekly newspapers in the Boston area. Horgan's estate shut down both the Mercury and the Malden Evening News in January 2017, stating that the papers' advertisers were in poor financial shape themselves, leading to a domino effect that caused the papers' failure.

== See also ==
- Malden Evening News—sister newspaper
