= Bill Cardoso =

American journalist (1937–2006)

- Born: William Joseph Cardoso; September 24, 1937; Boston, Massachusetts, US
- Died: February 26, 2006 (aged 68); Kelseyville, California, US
- Occupation: Journalist
- Known for: Coining "gonzo journalism"

William Joseph Cardoso (September 24, 1937 – February 26, 2006) was an American journalist. Noted for coining the term "gonzo journalism", he was a pioneer of New Journalism and a close friend of fellow journalist Hunter S. Thompson.

== Early life and education ==
Cardoso was born on September 24, 1937, in Boston. His father, John Alvin Cardoso, was born in Portugal and was a member of the United States Navy during World War I, as well as a Boston firefighter. His mother was Mary Cardoso (née Cordiro). Cardoso studied journalism at Boston University in the late 1950s.

== Career ==
Cardoso's career in journalism began with writing for the Medford Daily Mercury, which he did during his attendance to Boston University. He was the editor of the Globe Sunday magazine. He wrote for many publications in the 1960s and 1970s, such as Harper's Magazine, Ramparts, and Rolling Stone.

Cardoso met Hunter S. Thompson on a press bus during the 1968 New Hampshire Democratic presidential primary, where they shared cannabis and befriended each other. Cardoso coined the term "gonzo journalism" when describing Thompson's writing style in a letter to him. He claimed it was a corruption of gonzeaux, a Canadian French term. He and Thompson both attended and covered The Rumble in the Jungle boxing match on October 30, 1974. Cardoso remained in Zaire for six extra weeks, as he could not afford a new ticket following a flight delay. He originally was to write on the boxing match, instead writing an approximately 15,000-word article mostly on his time in Zaire, which was published for New Times magazine.

Upon leaving the Globe in the early 1970s, he traveled to Azores, the Canary Islands—where he operated a jazz club—and Israel. He returned to the United States in the mid-1970s and stayed in Los Angeles before settling in San Francisco. Following a divorce, he moved in with Thompson in Colorado. He returned to California to live with Mary Miles Ryan, who he was in a relationship with.

In 1984, Cardoso released The Maltese Sangweech and Other Heroes, which was named for a menu of a San Francisco restaurant with rumored mob ties. Published by Atheneum Books, it contained ten of his journalistic works. In 1990, he released Dr Kurland and Dr O'Connor: The Story of a Feud.

== Personal life and death ==
Cardoso married three times, having a daughter, Linda, in the first marriage. He was in a relationship with Mary Miles Ryan from c. 1976 until his death, though did not marry. He was diagnosed with head and neck cancer in his later life. He died on February 26, 2006, aged 68, in his home in Kelseyville, California, of heart failure.
