= Wah Ching =

Chinese American gang

- 華青幫會
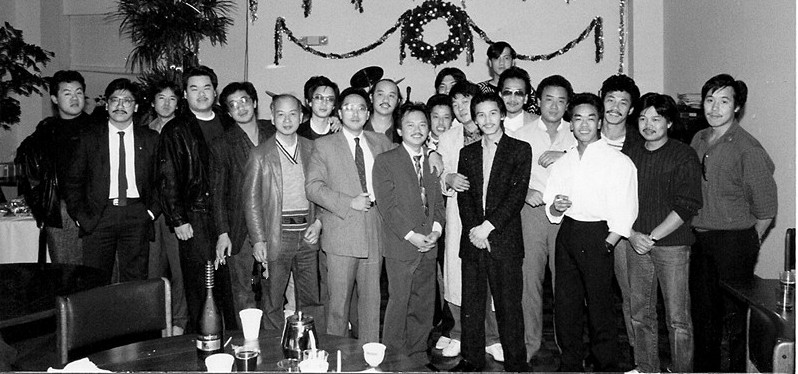
- Wah Ching members
- Founded: 1968
- Founding location: Chinatown, San Francisco, United States
- Years active: 1968–present
- Territory: San Francisco Bay Area and Greater Los Angeles
- Ethnicity: Primarily Chinese American, Vietnamese American, Korean American
- Membership (est.): 600–700 members and associates
- Activities: Racketeering, murder, robbery, extortion, drug trafficking, money laundering, prostitution, illegal gambling, loan sharking, fraud, counterfeiting, software piracy
- Allies: 14K; Hop Sing Tong; Suey Sing Tong; Sun Yee On; Tiny Rascal Gang; Bloods
- Rivals: Asian Boyz; Bamboo Union; Black Dragons; Chung Ching Yee; Wo Hop To

Wah Ching
- Traditional Chinese: 華青
- Simplified Chinese: 华青
Transcriptions
Standard Mandarin
- Hanyu Pinyin: Huáqīng
Yue: Cantonese
- Yale Romanization: Wàh Chīng
- Jyutping: waa^{4} cing^{1}

Wah Ching (Chinese: 華青; Jyutping: Waa^{4} Cing^{1}; lit. 'Youth of China') is a Chinese American criminal organization and street gang that was founded in San Francisco, California in 1964. The Wah Ching has been involved in crimes including narcotic sales, racketeering, and gambling.

== History ==
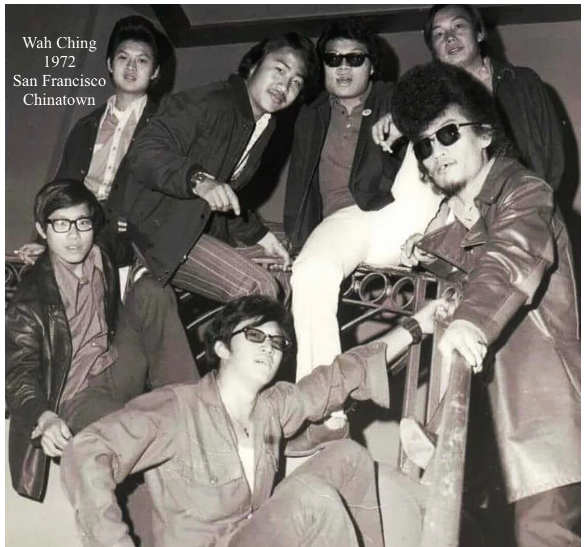
Wah Ching members

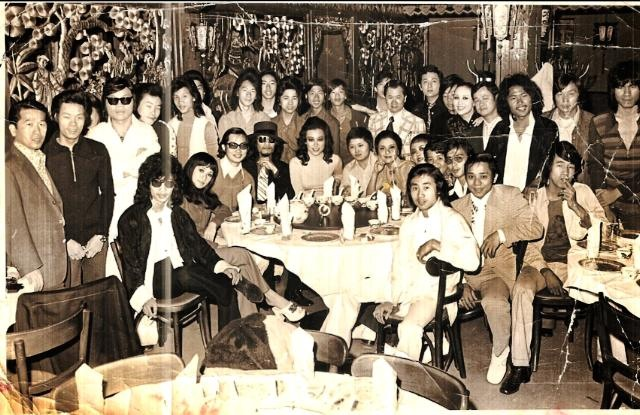
Wah Ching members

The Wah Ching (Youth of China) was founded in 1964 mainly by immigrants from Hong Kong and China working at Hop Sing Tong gambling establishments in San Francisco's Chinatown. The gang was first formed as a protection group from the ABCs (American born Chinese) and later evolved into a criminal gang.

Beginning in 1969, the Wah Ching fought a war with the Suey Sing Tong for control of Chinatown's gambling, loan-sharking and extortion rackets. After a number of shootings and homicides, the Suey Sing relinquished their territory and reestablished themselves in Oakland. Wah Ching first received widespread media attention because of the 1977 Golden Dragon Massacre (GDM) involving another Chinese gang, the Chung Ching Yee, or Joe Boys (JBS). The event took place at the Golden Dragon Restaurant in San Francisco's Chinatown. Five people were killed, and eleven others were injured. None of the victims were gang members. Five Joe Boys members were convicted of the shooting. The cause of the attack was vandalism by Wah Ching to the graves of several Joe Boy members and a shootout that took place a few months earlier that left one Joe Boy dead and two others wounded.

During the mid-1960s, Wah Ching established themselves in Southern California, mainly around Chinatown, Los Angeles and the San Gabriel Valley. The Southern California branch of Wah Ching was led by David Quon and Philip Lee throughout the 1960s and 1970s. During this time, Wah Ching in Los Angeles operated illegal gambling houses, brothels, extortion rackets, and loan-sharking. Nearing the mid-1970s, Los Angeles Wah Ching recruited Tony Young, whom later became the leader of Southern California Wah Ching in the 1980s up until around mid 1990s.

During the 1960s and 1970s in Chinatown, Los Angeles, the contest for gang dominance was between the Joe Boys, Yao Lai, and the Wah Ching. However, Wah Ching was able to push these gangs out of Los Angeles Chinatown and took over their illegal establishments. Wah Ching became the dominant gang in Chinatown, Los Angeles throughout most of the 1970s and early 1980s.

In 1991, Danny "Ah Pai" Wong, the leader of Wah Ching, was shot and killed by Wo Hop To (WHT) hitmen from Seattle Chinatown. After the murder, most of the Wah Ching members began to leave town, change sides, or retire.

After law enforcement cracked down on the Wo Hop To around 1992, former Wah Ching members who had defected to the Wo Hop To founded the Jackson Street Boys, a gang based in San Francisco's Chinatown which resumed what a SFPD officer described in 2000 as "the same stuff on a smaller scale and without the same visibility", including extortion of local merchants and operating gambling dens.

By the mid-1990s, Southern California Wah Ching had already divided itself into four main branches because of internal disagreements. The four original Wah Ching branches (referred to as sides) are called Sonny-Side, Paul-Side, Ken-Side, and Taiwanese-Side, all named after their founders names or aliases. Despite Wah Ching breaking up into several branches, there was no internal war between the different Wah Ching sides and all sides were led by a lung tao ('dragon head') or dai lao ('older brother') who oversaw their group's activities.

In the mid-1990s, the Wah Ching was reported as being engaged in murder, extortion, drug trafficking and gambling, and expanded into software bootlegging.

The Wah Ching Gang has an ongoing conflict with another rival Asian gang in Los Angeles, the Asian Boyz (ABZ), who also aligned themselves with the Vietnamese Boyz (VBZ) in opposition to Wah Ching. Wah Ching's move from its original home in the Bay Area to Southern California is probably one of the sources of the disputes over gang turf.

Over the decades, the Wah Ching has evolved from a street gang to an organized crime group, however, due to the fact that a lot of the Wah Ching's criminal activity and murders have been motivated by political agendas. There is law enforcement anecdotal evidence that suggests as a group the gang has developed strong associations with other Asian organized crime groups, such as the 14K and Sun Yee On triads in Hong Kong.

== Notable incidents ==
The Wah Ching has been in a long conflict with the Asian Boyz. One of the first shootouts between the two gangs occurred in the 1990s. The shooting occurred in El Monte at a pool hall. An Asian Boyz gang member, Lea Mek, was killed by Wah Ching gang member Chieu Luong Yang. Another shootout between the two gangs occurred in San Marino that led to the deaths of two youths at a San Marino High School graduation party in June. After an investigation by the authorities, police claimed that when the Asian Boyz gang members arrived at the party, they noticed that Wah Ching gang members were there, prompting them to leave and return with weapons. At least nine gang members were arrested, and police seized five weapons from homes searched in conjunction with the arrests. The shootouts between the two gangs were called "Summer Madness" by the Asian Boyz gang, and resulted in at least 42 deaths on both sides.

On June 2, 2007, Anh Duoc Nguyen, a member of Monterey Park-Side Wah Ching, shot at five people in Westminster's Bowling Green Park, severely injuring one. The shootout was believed to be motivated by the fact that one of the victims had changed his Myspace page bio to read "garden gang".

== Organization ==
The Wah Ching's main structure consists of one main boss under the union and various factions called sides who have leaders or lung tao ('dragon head') or dai lao ('older brother') who work together to organize their syndicates with the sole purpose of making money. The number of members in each side can vary anywhere from a few dozen to a couple thousand, and the total number of sides is believed to be around 10.

=== Southern California sides ===
- Chinatown, San Francisco – Wah Ching members moved to Los Angeles and founded Wah Ching in the Los Angeles area in the mid-1960s. In the early and mid 1990s, the four original "sides" (branches) where founded by four top ranking Los Angeles Wah Ching members.
- Sonny-Side (SS-23) – One of the four original sides. Sonny, the founder, was also one of the first followers of Joe Young that formed his own side.
- Ken-Side (KS-23) – One of the four original sides, Ken was the first Vietnamese Chinese to become a triad head and also one of the first recruits of Joe Young.
- Paul-Side (PS-23) – One of the four original sides. P-Side is located in the Greater Los Angeles area and is known for generating most of their income through legal means. Paul-Side was founded by Paul A, following Joe Young and starting his own side.
- Taiwanese-Side (TS-23/Taiwanese (JS23)– One of the four original sides. Taiwanese Side founded by members of the original Wah Ching members from San Francisco. The migration from San Francisco with Joe Young formed Taiwanese Side.
- Monterey Park-Side (MP-Side/ MP-23) – Located in Monterey Park, MP-Side is infamous for its narcotics sales and involvement in mass shootings. The Monterey park side was founded by a split between Paul Side. One side stayed Paul Side while the other was formed as Monterey park side.
- Alhambra-Side (A-Side/ AS-23) – Located in Alhambra, A-Side was founded by members from San Francisco Side, later renamed to Alhambra Side after members left the San Francisco Side.
- Ocean-Side (OS-23) – Although a relatively new side, Ocean-Side has gained a reputation for being violent and committing an abundant number of crimes.
- Flip-Side (FS-23) – A purported side of the Wah Ching composed mainly of Filipinos, Flip-Side was believed to be the side of Wah Ching that was affiliated the with Bloods.

The four original sides, Ken-Side, Paul-Side, T-Side, and Sonny-Side, have a close relationship with one another and high-ranking members.

=== Northern California sides ===
- 510-side (EO-23) – Located in East Oakland, this side was founded by OG members of Wah Ching, and some Hop Sing Boys. The gang became infamous for its ruthlessness after requiring newly initiated members to "23-mark" a rival gang member. This initiation required one to beat a rival gang member either to death or to the point of unconsciousness, then to take a knife and carve a phrase such as "Wah Ching" or "Property of EO-23" onto the victims chest or forehead.
- Jackson-Side (Insane-Side Dragon Tribe/Tokyo Boyz/JS-23) – Founded by members of Alhambra-Side and Monterey Park-Side who went back to San Francisco to reestablish the gang's presence. When it was founded, Jackson-Side had no more than 100 members. Recently, Jackson-Side Wah Ching has been more commonly known as Insane-Side Wah Ching, due to the Wah Ching's rivalry with the similarly named Jackson Street Boys as well as the gang's habit for gruesome crimes such as 23-marking. Jackson-Side Wah Ching gang members are also recognized Chinese Playground Boys.
- 70-Side (X7-23) – A defunct side of the Wah Ching that was located on Alameda Island

=== Murders of Wah Ching members ===
Since 1969 to 1991, there have been six murders associated with Chinatown Wah Ching gang. Here is the chronology of violence:

- Harry Quan (or Kwan, (鴨仔), 14, shot March 9, 1972. – Shot from a car with a .32 caliber automatic as he stood with a group of youths in front of 815 Stockton Street, location of the Police Athletic League.
- Harry (The Professor") Ng (伍冉明), 60, shot March 13, 1972. – Murdered in his Kung Fu studio. Believed to have been a courier between the Wah Chings and a mysterious person in Hong Kong known only by a code name. Ng gunned down on a Monday, had airline reservations for Hong Kong the following Saturday. The 60 year old Ng, police say, was mentor of the Wah Ching thugs, teaching them extortion tactics.
- Poole Leong (亞宝), 22, shot June 13, 1972, On the night of June 13, 1972, Poole Leong, a Wah Ching member, was shot to death on the balcony of his apartment in the Ping Yuen housing project in the 800 block of Pacific Avenue, just off Grant Avenue. While talking on the telephone, Leong was approached by two Chinese youths. One produced a .25 caliber automatic and fired.
- Anton Wong (黃俊), 24, shot May 24, 1973. – Former leader of the Wah Ching, Anton Wong, murdered in broad daylight May 23 at Powell and Jackson Streets.
- Wayne Fung, 19, shot August 12, 1973. – At a service station at 19th Avenue and Irving Street where he was employed, Wayne Fung was killed by seven bullets from a .38 caliber automatic. The gunman, an Asian youth, fired the shots and ran to a waiting car parked on 18th Avenue, witnesses said. Fung, 19, was a member of the Wah Ching.
- Danny Wong (Ah Pai) (亞排), April 1991, three hitmen from Seattle Chinatown pulled the alleged Wah Ching kingpin from his car and shot him to death only minutes after he left a mah-jongg game in the basement of a Chinatown Tong building. Law enforcement sources say the murder was ordered by Peter Chong and was related to a struggle between Wong's gang and the Wo Hop To Triad, which was attempting to unify control over Asian organized crime in Northern California at the time.
