= Triads in the United Kingdom =

Triads in the United Kingdom first appeared during the post-World War era with the 14K Triad emerging in Chinese communities in London, Birmingham, Liverpool and Manchester in England and Glasgow, Edinburgh and Dundee in Scotland as early as 1952. A later migration followed as members of Chung Mon's organisation fled Amsterdam following the Triad leader's death in 1975 as well as those from Hong Kong during the 1980s.

== Early years of Triad activity ==
Although illegal gambling dens, brothels, opium dens and mahjong schools developed in the 19th century in Chinese communities, it is uncertain when the triads and tongs first came over to the UK.

== Drug trafficking and cooperation with the United States ==
It is unclear which Triad was responsible for first importing heroin into the UK; however, authorities believe it was originally transported from Hong Kong via Amsterdam by the Ng Sik-ho, and received by either the 14k or the recently arrived Wo Shing Wo.

Although warned by officials from the Federal Bureau of Narcotics and Dangerous Drugs Bureau (later known as the Drug Enforcement Administration) and the Federal Bureau of Investigation through the U.S. Embassy in London; British officials were unprepared to deal with the growing narcotics problem. With the United States becoming aware of the large amounts of heroin being smuggled via the UK, British officials were assisted by a resident officer attached to the U.S. Embassy who was assigned to gather intelligence on drug traffickers and identify couriers before eventually infiltrating their organisation. The resident officer ran into difficulties while working with British officials regarding his methods, which contrasted sharply with British policy. This included his use of a slush fund paid to informants to purchase drugs, whereas British criminal informants are not paid except for expenses.

With the corruption within the Hong Kong police force curtailed by the Independent Commission Against Corruption of Hong Kong, many of the city's triads turned to the UK where a narcotics task force was non-existent and their existence was largely unknown by British officials.

== Arrival of the Wo On Lok and the Sun Yee On ==
During the 1980s, the power of the Chinese underworld was constantly shifting from one Triad to another in an attempt to control Britain's drug trafficking trade. Triads soon began expanding into other criminal activities including VAT fraud using innocent loanshark and extortion victims to provide a front business. The Triads also began to turn away from heroin; instead turning to less serious drugs such as cannabis and designer drugs which were smuggled by Triad couriers from The Netherlands and Germany as they competed with rival European competitors.

Following the signing of the Sino-British Joint Declaration between the UK and China in 1984, the news of Hong Kong's return to China caused many Triads to flee to Britain, specifically the Wo On Lok and the Sun Yee On.

These newer Triads were far more organised and professional and, as many of its members were respected and prominent Hong Kong businessmen, they were easily able to use their legitimate businesses as fronts for tax evasion and money laundering. The Wo On Lok soon established themselves in Wales, London and Southampton in England and, maintaining links to similarly exiled groups in Ireland, France, the Netherlands and Germany, they engaged in smaller crime such as illegal gambling, counterfeiting, and selling illegally copied videos, although they also continued extortion activities on Chinese residents.

== Government prosecution ==
British authorities finally began to crack down on Triad activity during the early 1990s and, although law enforcement had been battling the Triads for some time, their first insight on the Triad structure and influence in British society came during the 1993 trial of George Cheung Wai-hen, an assassin for the Wo On Lok turned government informant, who testified at the Old Bailey against six Chinese immigrants who were charged with possession of a firearm with intent to cause grievous bodily harm to rival Triad member Lam Ying-kit after a failed attempt on his life on 7 September 1991.

According to testimony by Cheung, he also described his induction ceremony into the Wo On Lok which followed traditional Triad initiation taking place at around 2 am in the basement of the Princess Garden Chinese Restaurant in Greyhound Road, Fulham. During the ceremony he claimed to have paid his sponsor and dai lo, actor Tang Wai-ming, an initiation fee of £36.60 to operate in the UK. As a result of his testimony, Cheung was given a reduced sentence of five years imprisonment.

== Triads active in the United Kingdom ==
=== Wo Shing Wo ===
The Wo Shing Wo is considered by authorities to be the largest Triad operating in Britain. Although largely based in Manchester, Birmingham, Glasgow and London, it also has affiliated groups in Bristol, Newcastle, Stoke-on-Trent and Cardiff.

In the 90s, Wong Kwun-seng (the chairman), Kenny Ng Siu-hong (the deputy) and Andrew Lam Ngai-kan (the captain), were believed to lead hundreds of Wo Shing Wo members in the London area, whilst Georgie Pi (the leader) & Alan Chan (the second in command) led the Manchester branch but were confronted for their triad activities by Roger Cook during a 1993 edition of The Cook Report entitled "Meet the Triads".

Although members are recruited in the traditional manner, they also include prominent businessmen who either ally with the organisation for their own protection or as full associate participants in their criminal activities. Although they abide by the territorial urban districts of other Triad organisations, often centred around a Chinese cultural club or martial arts associations, they have been involved in extortion activities over areas as far afield as Truro and Great Yarmouth.

=== 14K Triad ===
Despite its declining power since its first appearance in the early 1950s, the 14k Triad, led by ‘Ponytail’ remains the oldest and well established in the underworld as the second largest Triad organisation operating in the UK. Based primarily in London and Liverpool, the 14k continues its traditional activities of loan sharking and extortion of Chinese businesses although they have also had a history of targeting other immigrant groups such as Indian and Pakistani running corner shops and small factories (however, West Indians have been more likely to report incidents of harassment and intimidation than their Asian counterparts). Much of the Triad's membership is made up of teenagers or illegal Chinese immigrants and there are now confirmed reports of non-Chinese and female members as well.

=== Sun Yee On ===
The Sun Yee On is an influential Triad organisation which, like its Hong Kong affiliates, is a highly organised criminal syndicate involved in white-collar crime as well as owning legitimate businesses, specifically in the entertainment industry a key red pole ‘Teflon’ Dyl, ‘Serpent’ and ‘Vibora’ are presumed to be British. Incense master ‘Daiki’ is also presumed to reside in the UK area of Sun Yee On.. This branch of the Sun Yee On is run by a man known only as ‘Gideon’. Based primarily in London and Liverpool, the Sun Yee on are a major Hong Kong triad operating worldwide.
