= Knife attack on Kevin Lau =

2014 stabbing attack in Hong Kong

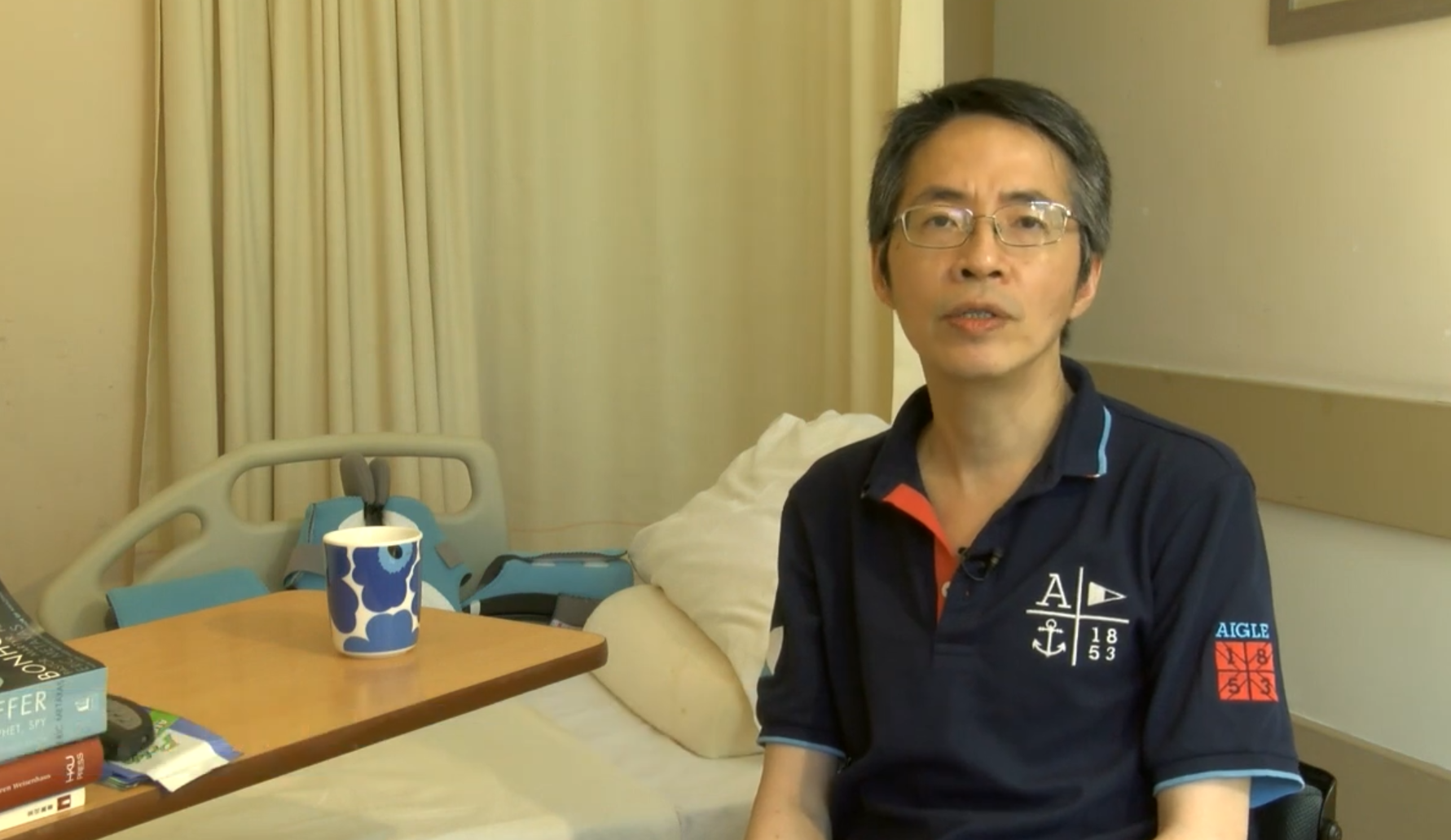
- Kelvin Lau in recovery
- Location: Tai Hong Street, Sai Wan Ho, Hong Kong
- Date: 26 February 2014; 10:20 am (UTC+8)
- Target: Kevin Lau
- Attack type: Triad attack
- Weapon: Meat cleaver
- Deaths: 0
- Injuries: 1 (Kevin Lau)
- Accused: 11
- Verdict: 19 years imprisonment
- Convicted: 2

Kevin Lau (Chinese: 劉進圖), former editor-in-chief of the Hong Kong daily newspaper Ming Pao, was attacked in the morning of 26 February 2014 in Lei King Wan, Hong Kong, by two men. He suffered cleaver wounds to his back and legs and underwent emergency surgery. The police and most commentators agreed that it was a triad-style attack aimed at maiming without killing.

Thousands of people attended a rally to denounce the attack. Ming Pao put up a reward of HK$3 million for information leading to the arrest of the perpetrators. While pro-establishment figures denied links between the attack and assaults on press freedom, local journalists and press saw it as part of longstanding mainland Chinese efforts to rein in Hong Kong's free press. Disagreements notwithstanding, the legislature unanimously passed a motion condemning the violence.

Eleven people, some of them with links to triads in Hong Kong, were later arrested in connection with the attack. On 21 August 2015, two suspects were sentenced in Hong Kong to 19 years imprisonment. The judge found no direct evidence linking the attack to Lau's work but voiced support for better protecting journalists.

== Background ==
=== Ming Pao editorial ===
Ming Pao is a major Chinese-language newspaper in Hong Kong, with a focus on liberalism and investigative reporting. Kevin Lau Chun-to (劉進圖) is a journalist with a law degree who was editor-in-chief of Ming Pao in Hong Kong since the retirement of his predecessor, Cheung Kin-bor, in 2012. A colleague at the Chinese University, where he lectured part-time, describes Lau as a "mild-mannered guy, an intellectual, a lawyer, a journalist, not in any way a firebrand radical or a controversial character". Under Lau's leadership, Ming Pao has continued in its liberal stance, investigated the suspicious death of Li Wangyang, spoken out against government policies such as Moral and National Education (MNE), and in favour of greater democratic reforms in Hong Kong – a stance seen as being unsympathetic to the Chinese central government. The journal scooped several political scandals, including the 2012 Henry Tang illegal basement controversy and a similar scandal involving CY Leung, Tang's erstwhile opponent for election as chief executive of Hong Kong. The paper also contributed to investigative work with the International Consortium of Investigative Journalists (ICIJ); this work looked into the offshore assets of China's leaders, including relatives of General Secretary of the Chinese Communist Party Xi Jinping, former Premier Wen Jiabao, and several members of the National People's Congress, and led to published stories.

In January 2014, Lau was abruptly replaced by Chong Tien Siong, a Singapore-based Malaysian who, according to The Economist, is widely regarded as pro-establishment. Chong had been former editor-in-chief of Nanyang Siang Pau, and was a vocal advocate of the compulsory MNE for school children before it was shelved in 2012 amid large protests against "brainwashing". Lau had been appointed chief operating officer of MediaNet Resources, a subsidiary of the parent organisation of the journal that publishes electronic books and teaching materials. A journalism academic said the manner in which Lau was replaced was "extremely abnormal", and that the owners need to explain. Staff at the journal feared that this meant a curtailment of its independent tradition. His staffers staged several protests: more than 90% of them petitioned to demanding to know the reason for Lau's removal, and four senior writers refused to submit copy for their columns in protest. Some 300 of his former colleagues signed a petition calling for safeguards to press freedom, and several thousand people took to the streets on 23 February in support of Lau and in reaction to the apparent imposition of controls on the press by the Chinese Communist Party.

=== Violence against journalists and media owners ===
Since the 1990s, there have been a spate of unsolved attacks against journalists and media owners who are not aligned with the Chinese Government. In 1996, journalist Leung Tin-wai was stabbed; in 1998, broadcaster Albert Cheng was accosted by a gang when leaving his office and was stabbed. In June 2013, Chen Ping, the publisher of iSun Affairs, a weekly magazine banned on the mainland, was beaten by two men armed with batons. Three masked men with knives threatened workers at Next Media, publisher of Apple Daily, and set thousands of copies of the paper on fire. Its proprietor, Jimmy Lai, a fervent supporter of the Pan-democracy camp, had the gate of his home rammed with a stolen car; the attacker left weapons at the scene and fled.

=== Financial pressure ===
Press freedom advocates point to trend of increasing self-censorship by editors, or media tycoons with substantial business interests in China installing editors who are pro-China. The South China Morning Post reported that AM730, an outspoken tabloid free-sheet, suffered a concerted advertising boycott from mainland Chinese companies. Beijing's representative office frequently pressures the free media in Hong Kong to revise or remove coverage that it dislikes. Hong Kong's ranking in Reporters Without Borders index on press freedom has slid from 18th place in 2002 to 61st in 2014.

== The incident ==
Lau was attacked on 26 February 2014 at approximately 10:20 am, as he was parking his car near a restaurant he is known to frequent for breakfast in Sai Wan Ho. An assailant armed with a meat cleaver hacked at Lau as soon as Lau got out of his car, leading to three knife wounds. The attacker climbed back onto the motorcycle driven by an accomplice and sped away. Lau managed to call the police using his telephone as the attackers raced away. He was admitted to hospital in a critical condition. Police described the brazen attack on Lau as a classic triad-style hit that was intended as a "warning" rather than intent to kill. One of the chest wounds penetrated his lung. A University of Hong Kong academic who has studied crime believes the attack was planned: "The attackers obviously knew which parts of the body to attack in order to cause severe bodily harm without killing him. If they intended to kill, they would not have targeted the neck, back and legs." Lau returned to work on 1 August 2014.

== Reactions ==
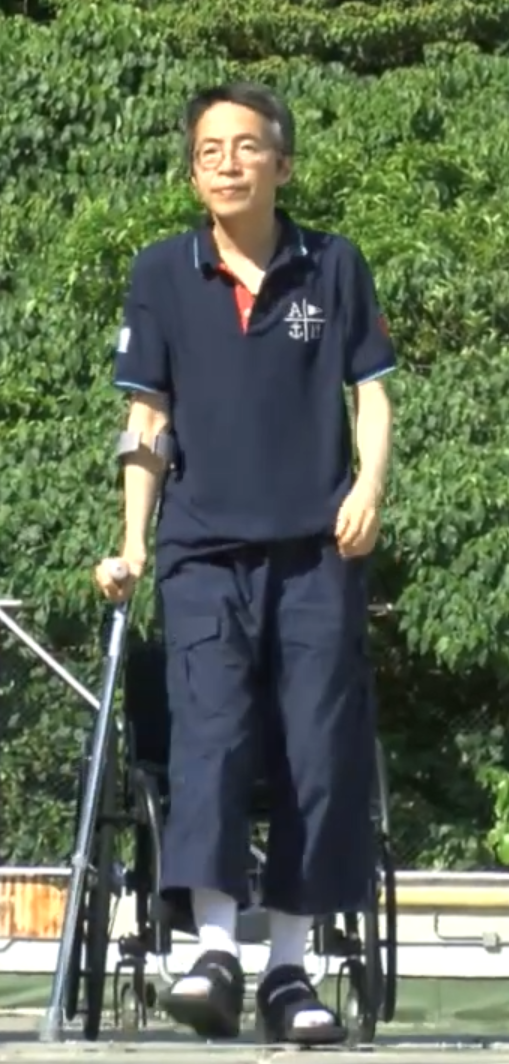
Kelvin Lau walking with elbow crutches and ankle foot orthosis

The day after the attack, a group of 200 people held vigil outside the government headquarters calling for safeguards. Ming Pao said it was "deeply angry that the assailants dared to conduct an attack in broad daylight", and offered a reward of HK$1 million ($128,000) for information leading to the apprehension of the assailants. Lau's family was reported to be under police protection. The ICIJ, which had been participating with Ming Pao on the investigations into the assets of China's leaders, said they were not aware of any connection between their investigation and the attack. The paper's editorial director said that he was co-operating with police investigations by reviewing all the recently published stories to try to establish possible motives. Ming Pao staff were said to be distraught and in shock. Ming Pao tripled its reward to HK$3 million within days of making the first offer. Regular South China Morning Post columnist Alex Lo summarised the fear in journalists saying: "If a respected editor could be attacked in such a blatant and ruthless manner, no one in the news-gathering business is safe".

Journalism organisations were outraged by the attack – the Hong Kong Journalists Association condemned the violence, and the Foreign Correspondents' Club expressed "shock" at the incident and urged the government to ensure safety of members of the press. Many saw the attack as politically motivated and part of an unhealthy trend in which the Chinese Communist Party sought to reign in Hong Kong's free press. Lau's friend and fellow journalist Shirley Yam said that such a flagrant attack strongly suggests that Lau had antagonised somebody powerful in the course of his work. In a commentary in the South China Morning Post, Mike Rowse said, "The assailants clearly came to maim rather than to kill, which they could easily have done. They were hired for the purpose and targeted a particular individual. This was not a random exercise; it was a well-planned assault intended to send a message." He called it "an attack on freedom of the press." A spokesman for the Committee to Protect Journalists declined to link the attack to Lau's work on China, but admitted there was "a growing chilling effect on journalists and media houses in Hong Kong, and that pressure is coming from China."

Representatives of mainland China, the US and EU in Hong Kong all expressed concern over the attack, and Hong Kong's Chief executive CY Leung expressed his indignation and outrage. More than 8,600 people dressed in black attended a rally on 2 March in defence of press freedom. Many banners bore the slogan "They can't kill us all". Ming Pao chief executive Tiong Kiew Chiong and the paper's new chief editor were photographed at the rally; some pro-Beijing lawmakers were also present. Organisers claimed 13,000 participants attended the march. In a pre-recorded message to the rally, Lau urged people not to take freedom for granted. He said: "We cannot assume it will never change. It takes everyone to guard it." The march culminated at the police headquarters in Wan Chai, where organisers delivered a 30,000-signature petition to the Hong Kong Police.

Legislators strongly condemned the attack on Lau, and urged the police to "spare no effort to arrest the assailants, so as to expeditiously bring them to justice". While pan-democrats sought to link the attack to press freedom in the motion and amendments, pro-establishment figures argued that it was "too early to conclude" that the two issues were linked. Ip Kwok-him of the Democratic Alliance for the Betterment and Progress of Hong Kong said that while he privately believed that there was a strong link between the attack and freedom of the press, lawmakers ought to be prudent as investigations are ongoing. The motion condemning the violent attack on Lau passed unanimously by all 56 legislators present in the chamber; amendments urging preservation of press freedom and protection of journalists were also voted through at the end of March.

== Arrests and trial ==
Eleven people, some of whom have connections to the Shui Fong triad gang, were arrested in connection with the attack. The two main suspects were detained in Guangdong, China. Seven more had been arrested in several sweeps across Hong Kong on 12 March. Hong Kong Police had received word on 9 March that two suspects had been tracked down by Mainland police in Dongguan and was now seeking their extradition. The police commissioner Andy Tsang said they suspected the attack was carried out by hired hands. Two defendants eventually confessed to receiving money and carrying out the attack, but the defense attorney argued that their confession had been extracted by the police under duress. The two were ultimately convicted by a jury and sentenced to 19 years imprisonment. The presiding judge said although there lacked direct evidence that the attack, motivated by financial gain, was related to Lau's work, journalists deserved adequate protection under the law.

== See also ==
- Lam Bun
- Media of Hong Kong
