= Chinatown massacre =

Chinatown massacre can refer to:

- Chinese massacre of 1871 (Los Angeles, 1871)
- Golden Dragon massacre (San Francisco, 1977)
- Wah Mee massacre (Seattle, 1983)
- Boston Chinatown massacre (Boston, 1991)
