= Stephen Tse =

Restaurant owner and crime syndicate leader

- Born: Tse Chun-on; 1949 or 1950 (age 76–77); Hong Kong
- Other name: "Sky Dragon"
- Occupation: leader of the Ping On syndicate
- Criminal charges: racketeering, murder-for-hire

Stephen Tse (Tse Chun-on or Chun-wah, a.k.a. "Sky Dragon") is the former restaurateur and head of the Ping On syndicate, which controlled criminal activity in the area of Boston Chinatown from the late 1970s through the mid-1980s. Tse was jailed for sixteen months starting in 1984 for refusing to answer questions after being subpoenaed by the President's Commission on Organized Crime, marking the start of the decline of Ping On influence over Boston.

After his release from contempt charges relating to the subpoena, Tse and the Ping On were forced to share power with rival groups that had grown stronger while he was jailed. A failed 1988 assassination attempt on two competing leaders who had openly defied him led to his eventual arrest, extradition, and conviction in 1996.

== Early activities and rise ==
Stephen Tse is also known as Tse Chun Wah or Tse Chun On, depending on the source. Tse was born in Hong Kong, where he was a member of the 14K Triad, and became a naturalized American citizen in 1987 or 1988.

Tse moved from New York to Boston in the 1970s; his first criminal charge was in 1974 for a home invasion in Brookline. He served two years of a ten-year sentence. After his release, Tse joined the On Leong, but they expelled him shortly afterward and he joined the Hung Mun (Chee Kung Tong or CKT) social club in 1977, then founded the Ping On Club in 1982 at the Chinese Freemasons Building (6 Tyler Street). At this time, Tse was also operating the Kung Fu restaurant in Chinatown, from which he ran criminal activities for the Ping On.

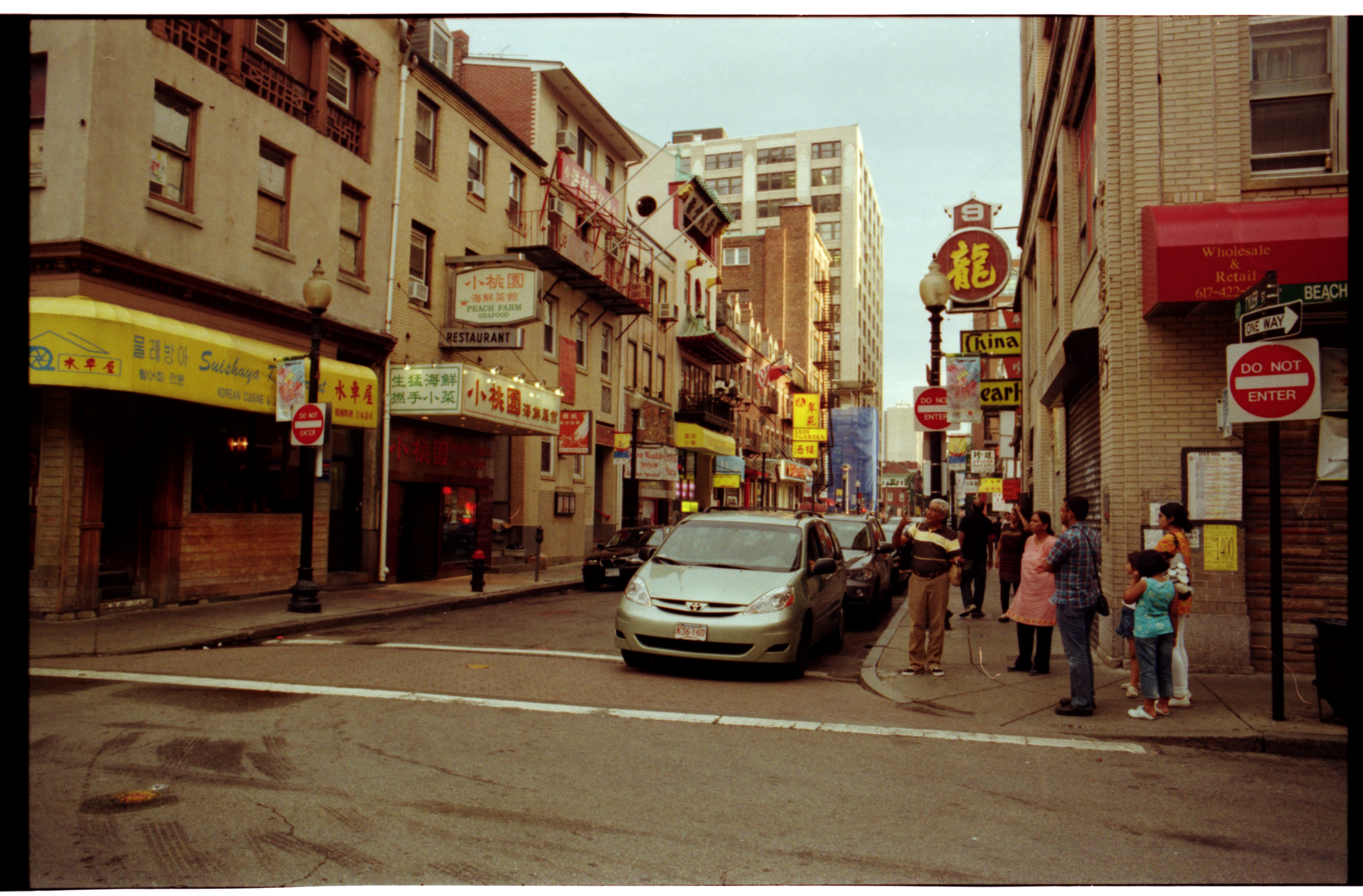
Tyler Street at Beach in Chinatown, facing south (2010); the Four Seas was at the space now occupied by Peach Farm Seafood.

Police believe that Tse rose to power in Boston Chinatown by operating gambling and extortion activities independently of the existing influence of the On Leong Tong; instead of the youths that tongs employed as enforcers, Tse used Hong Kong-born criminals. During this time, Tse was allied with Harry Mook (Goon Chun Yee), head of the local CKT, operator of the Four Seas restaurant, and reputedly the godfather of Chinatown. The Four Seas and Kung Fu restaurants were next to each other on Tyler Street; the Four Seas address was listed as 4 Tyler Street in 1978.

== Contempt charges and waning influence ==
After receiving a subpoena on September 20, 1984 from the President's Commission on Organized Crime to answer questions about an apparent unity ceremony he had participated in with the heads of other triad crime organizations in Hong Kong, Tse appeared before the Commission on October 1 and asserted his Fifth Amendment right against self-incrimination; after he was granted immunity on October 19 in exchange for his testimony, he continued to refuse to answer questions and was found in contempt after a brief proceeding. At the time, Tse was living in Quincy and he gave his occupation as manager of the Kung Fu restaurant.

Tse was incarcerated for sixteen months; after his release on February 27, 1986, the Ping On's influence had weakened, as Tse was forced to negotiate a peace that year with Cao Xuan Dien, the leader of Vietnamese gangs in Boston. After his naturalization in 1987 or 1988, Tse spent most of his time in Hong Kong.

In December 1988, Cuong Khanh "Dai Keung" Luu and Chao Va Meng demanded $30,000 from the Ping On for undelivered counterfeit green cards. Luu asked for the payment to be delivered to him in Tse's Kung Fu restaurant; Tse was infuriated, as paying a rival in his own restaurant would cause him to lose face: "Have I died?!" This led to an unsuccessful assassination attempt against Luu and Meng on the night of December 29, 1988. Tse ordered Jimmy Soo Hoo and Kwok-Wah Chan from the Ping On to use automatic weapons; Soo Hoo and Chan fired on Luu and Meng for 30 to 60 seconds, but failed to hit either man. Tse and his chief lieutenant Michael Kwong were arrested along with a larger group for gambling in Chinatown on January 2, 1989; they were fined $50 each and released, then Tse fled to Hong Kong.

The end of the Ping On's influence in Chinatown was marked by the murder of gang lieutenant Michael Kwong, shot to death inside his New Dragon Chef restaurant in Arlington on August 11, 1989. Michael Kwong had been seen arguing with Wayne Kwong (no relation) earlier; Wayne Kwong was perceived as a rising underworld leader in Chinatown. Tse did not return from Hong Kong for Michael Kwong's funeral, and no retribution was exacted for the murder. However, Luu was murdered (along with four others) by three men connected to Tse on the night of January 11–12, 1991, during the Boston Chinatown massacre, which was thought to be part of a continued struggle for power. Mook pleaded guilty to charges of racketeering and money laundering in July 1991. By that time, Tse had permanently returned to Hong Kong and no longer had power in Boston.

== 1994 arrest and trial ==
Stephen Tse was indicted along with 15 co-defendants (including his wife Angela) on December 21, 1993, on seventeen criminal counts, including racketeering, extortion, and illegal immigration. Tse was arrested on January 6, 1994 while attempting to cross the border from Hong Kong into China with US$150,000 (equivalent to $326,000 in 2025); the arrest came at the request of the United States government. The governor of Hong Kong executed a warrant of surrender on January 13, 1995, extraditing Tse to the United States.

Tse was convicted of three counts related to murder in aid of racketeering (two counts of attempted murder, and one count of conspiracy to commit murder, relating to the 1988 attempt on Luu and Meng) on July 25, 1996 and was subsequently sentenced to a term of 188 months. Tse's appeal was denied by the First Circuit Court of Appeals on February 3, 1998.
