= Boston Chinatown massacre =

1991 fatal shooting in gambling den

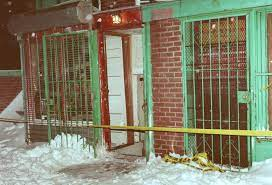

- Boston Chinatown massacre (Boston)
- Location: 42°20′56.3″N 71°3′41.8″W; 85 Tyler Street, Boston, Massachusetts, United States
- Date: January 12, 1991; 35 years ago c. 3:30 a.m. (EST)
- Attack type: Mass shooting, mass murder, gang violence
- Deaths: 5
- Injuries: 1
- Perpetrators: Phạm Tiến Hùng (suspect); Nam The Tham (convicted); Siny Van Tran (convicted)

The Boston Chinatown massacre or Tyler Street Massacre was a gang-related shooting in which five men were killed execution-style in a Boston Chinatown gambling den in the early morning hours of January 12, 1991. A sixth victim was seriously injured but survived. While no motive has been officially established, initial police reports and later Federal Bureau of Investigation (FBI) investigations indicated that the Ping On gang and one of the victims were vying for power in Boston Chinatown.

Two of the perpetrators, Nam The Tham and Siny Van Tran, were convicted of murder in 2005 after a decade-long international manhunt led to their 2001 extradition from China to the United States via Hong Kong. Both Tran and Tham are serving life sentences in prison while the third suspect, Phạm Tiến Hùng, has not yet been found as of 2026.

== Background ==
People at the social club, Jan 11–12, 1991
Perpetrators		Patrons (Note: All shot and killed except as noted.)		
Name	Nicknames	Name	Nicknames	Arrival
Phạm Tiến Hùng	"Hung Sook" "Uncle Hung"	Chung Wah Son (Note: Serving as doorman.)	"Shanghai Lo" "Shanghai Man" "Four Eyed Guy"	before midnight
Phạm Tiến Hùng	"Hung Sook" "Uncle Hung"	Van Tran	"Lan Guai"	before midnight
Phạm Tiến Hùng	"Hung Sook" "Uncle Hung"	[unknown] (Note: These two men were never positively identified after the shooting.)	"Tong Dung" (Note: Left shortly after 2 AM and was not present for the shooting.)	before midnight
Nam The Tham (Note: Arrested in China; extradited to US via Hong Kong, 2001; convicted, 2005)	"Johnny Cheung" "Ah Cheung"	[unknown]	"Ah B" (Note: Survived; not shot.)	before midnight
Nam The Tham	"Johnny Cheung" "Ah Cheung"	Cuong Khand Luu (Note: Khand has also been variously spelled as Khong and Khanh.)	"Dai Keung"	before midnight
Nam The Tham	"Johnny Cheung" "Ah Cheung"	Man Cheung	"Ah Wen"	before midnight
Siny Van Tran	"Toothless Wah"	Yu Man Young (Note: Club manager)	"Chou Pei Man" "Wrinkled Face Man"	midnight
Siny Van Tran	"Toothless Wah"	Pak Wing Lee (Note: Survived gunshot wound to head.)	"Lee Sui Lung" "Bruce"	approx. 2 AM
Siny Van Tran	"Toothless Wah"	David Quang Lam	"Dai San Wai" "Big Mouth Hao"	approx. 2:30 AM

=== Gambling den ===
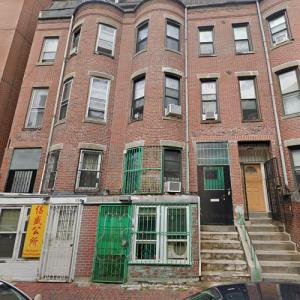
The exterior of the gambling club at 85 Tyler St.

The massacre took place in an illegal gambling den (sometimes called a "social club") managed by Yu Man Young (aka "Chou Pei Man") in the basement of a building on 85 Tyler Street in Boston Chinatown. The gambling den was frequented by ethnic Chinese immigrants from Myanmar, many of whom worked as waiters in nearby restaurants and gambled after work. The den was not open to the public; people who sought admission would ring a bell, and Young or a designated doorman would view their face on a video screen before opening the door. The den remained open as long as patrons were present, so it did not keep regular hours.

The club at the 85 Tyler Street site was originally run by the Ping On until that gang fell apart in 1989 after the assassination of Michael Kwong, who was running the Ping On in Stephen "Sky Dragon" Tse's absence. Reportedly, Young, an associate of Ping On leader Stephen Tse, had reorganized the club just two months before the massacre.

=== Perpetrators ===
All three suspects are Vietnamese nationals who either grew up in China or are ethnically Chinese. All three men also had worked for Stephen Tse, leader of the Ping On gang, before the massacre.

Phạm Tiến Hùng (aka "Hung Sook", "Uncle Hung") is a Vietnamese national of Chinese descent. According to Assistant U.S. Attorney Susan Hanson-Philbrick, Pham was a rising star in Asian American organized crime in the late 1980s. Pham was a loyal Ping On member throughout the 1980s who had 200 men at his disposal, control over lower Washington Street at the western edge of Chinatown, control over at least two gambling parlors, and his own drug business offshoot from Ping On.

Nam The Tham (aka "Johnny Cheung") was born in North Vietnam in 1958. His father was a prominent Vietnamese lawyer who was arrested in 1978 and disappeared. After Tham was sent to school in China, he returned to Vietnam, and then moved back to China, Hong Kong, and finally the United States, arriving in San Francisco in 1981.

Siny Van Tran (aka "Toothless Wah") was born in Vietnam before growing up in China and working as a sailor and a cook.

=== Motivation ===
No motive has been officially established, but initial police reports indicated a conflict between Chinese and Vietnamese gangs vying for power in Boston Chinatown in the aftermath of the late 1980s decline of Ping On.

Stephen Tse moved from New York to Boston in the 1970s and joined the Hung Mun in 1977. In 1982, Tse founded the Ping On, a powerful gang that would eventually control Boston Chinatown. However, Tse was jailed in 1984 for sixteen months after refusing to answer questions about an apparent unity ceremony he carried out with the heads of other triad organizations in Hong Kong. Tse responded to the subpoena from the President's Commission on Organized Crime by asserting his Fifth Amendment right against self-incrimination; after he was granted immunity in exchange for testimony, he continued to refuse to answer questions and was found in contempt. The power of the Ping On waned in his absence, and in 1986 Tse was forced to negotiate a peace with Cao Xuan Dien, the leader of the Vietnamese gangs in Boston.

In December 1988, Cuong Khanh "Dai Keung" Luu demanded $30,000 from a Ping On gang member in Boston for undelivered fake green cards. Luu asked for the payment to be delivered to him in Tse's restaurant named Kung Fu, which also served as headquarters for the Ping On; this infuriated Tse, as paying a rival in his own restaurant would cause him to lose face. An FBI agent testified in 2005 that Luu was serving Peter Chong as a member of Tien Ha Wui (the "Whole Earth Society"), a San Francisco gang that was conspiring to unify Asian organized crime in the United States under a single organization, which would have put Ping On out of business at the time.

Stephen Tse ordered the assassination of Luu after failed negotiations, asking Pham to use automatic weapons. Around 11 p.m. on December 29, 1988, Ping On gang members attempted to shoot Luu and Chao Va Meng (who had similarly demanded payment inside Kung Fu) in a parking lot on Tyler Street, but the assassination attempt failed. Although the two would-be assassins fired at Meng and Luu for 30 to 60 seconds, they failed to hit either man. Tse fled to Hong Kong after his arrest for gambling in Chinatown on January 2, 1989.

While Tse remained in Hong Kong, Luu began gathering gang members in New York in January 1989 in a retaliatory assassination attempt on the Ping On leaders in Boston. High-ranking Ping On members were aware of the plot, and Tse safely returned to the United States in May 1989 and October 1990 with Pham. The failed 1988 assassination attempt on Luu would lead to Tse's eventual conviction and incarceration: Tse was apprehended in January 1994 trying to cross the border from Hong Kong to China with $150,000; he was extradited to the United States and convicted in 1996 for attempted murder and conspiracy to commit murder, relating to the attempt on Luu and Meng in 1988.

During Boston police interrogations following the arrest and extradition of Tham and Tran in December 2001, Tham claimed that Pham gave him a gun and instructed him to "kill, kill, kill" the gambling den manager Yu Man Young. He later told detectives that the targets had been both Young and Luu. "Bac Guai" John Willis, who was close to Luu and had ties to the Ping On, believes that Luu was the primary target that night.

== Massacre ==
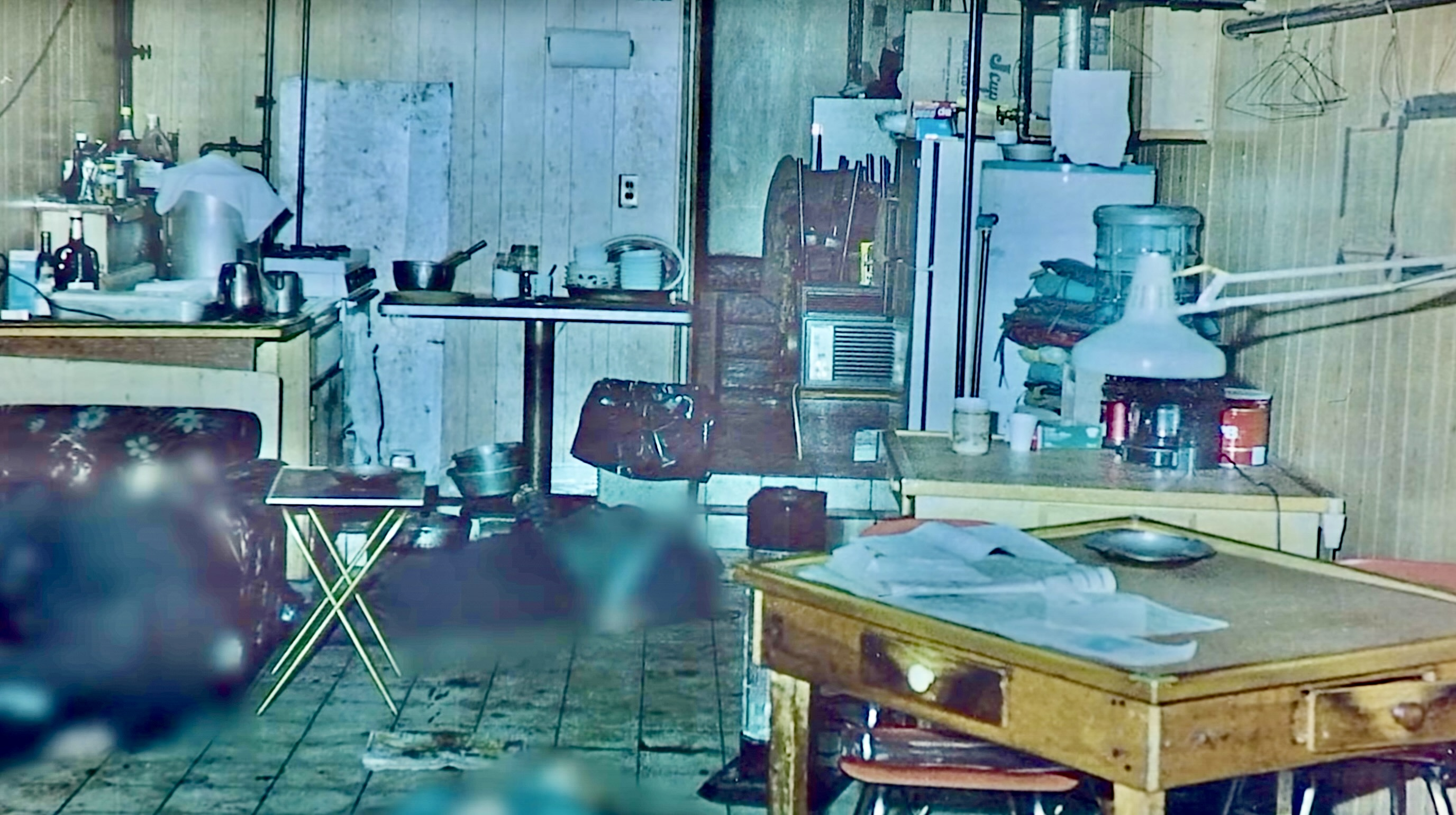

On the night of January 11–12, 1991, at approximately midnight, Young arrived at the social club and was admitted by Chung Wah Son (aka "Four Eyed Guy"). According to Young's testimony, five men; Van Tran (no relation to Siny Van Tran), Tong Dung, Ah B, Luu, and Luu's associate Man Cheung, were present and playing cards. After 2 am, Pak Wing Lee arrived and "Tong Dung" left. Siny Van Tran entered the club for the first time at 2:30 am with David Quang Lam (aka "Dai San Wai" or "Big Mouth Hao"), then left alone; Siny Van Tran and Lam had been drinking together earlier that evening. According to Young, Siny Van Tran later returned with Tham and Pham before dawn on January 12. The three men announced their intent to rob the gambling den and brandished revolver pistols.

Lee testified that Tham was the first to enter, followed by Siny Van Tran and then Hung Pham. Chung Wah Son was the first victim to be shot; Tham shot him three times in the head and arm after the door was opened, according to Lee.

The trio ordered the other patrons to put their hands behind their heads; Luu and Cheung knelt on the floor with their hands up, Van Tran laid his head on the table, "Ah B" and Lee hid under the table, and Lam crouched behind the table. According to Young's testimony, after Tham killed Son, Hung Tien Pham shot Luu twice in the head while Siny Van Tran shot Cheung twice in the head. Siny Van Tran then killed Van Tran (no relation) who was seated, with a shot to the head. Pham and Van Tran then shot Lam twice in the face and once in the chest respectively as he attempted to walk out of the club's back exit. According to Lee's testimony, the shooting lasted around five to six minutes. Lee told investigators that after Lam was shot, he felt Pham place a gun to the back of his head. Lee pleaded with him not to fire, but Lee heard a bang, and then nothing. The range was sufficiently close that gunpowder residue was later found on the victims' clothing. Young testified the three killers ran out of bullets before they could shoot him or "Ah B", while Lee said he heard Young beg for his life and "Ah B" swore he would "work like a cow or a horse for [Hung Sook]."

Young, "Ah B", and the three assailants fled in different directions after Lee was shot. Five of the six victims were killed: Cheung, Lam, Luu, Son, and Van Tran. Two security guards were stationed at the emergency room of the nearby New England Medical Center (NEMC) on Harrison Street and may have heard the shots; one of the guards attributed the sound to a snowplow going over a manhole cover, while the other had not noticed any sounds. The guard later testified the sounds had occurred around 3:30 am.

After waking up around 4 am, the sixth shooting victim, Lee, crawled away from the massacre, dragged himself through a back door to a parking lot, and shouted for help; a passing couple noticed he was bleeding and alerted one of the two security guards at the NEMC ER. The guard alerted police and called for an ambulance, which took Lee to a hospital where he stayed for approximately a week while recovering. Lee survived because the bullet entered his skull but narrowly missed his brain, and he later became a key witness in the investigation. After the police entered the scene around 4:15 am, they found one of the gunshot victims inside was still breathing; he was taken to the hospital, but died later.

== Aftermath ==
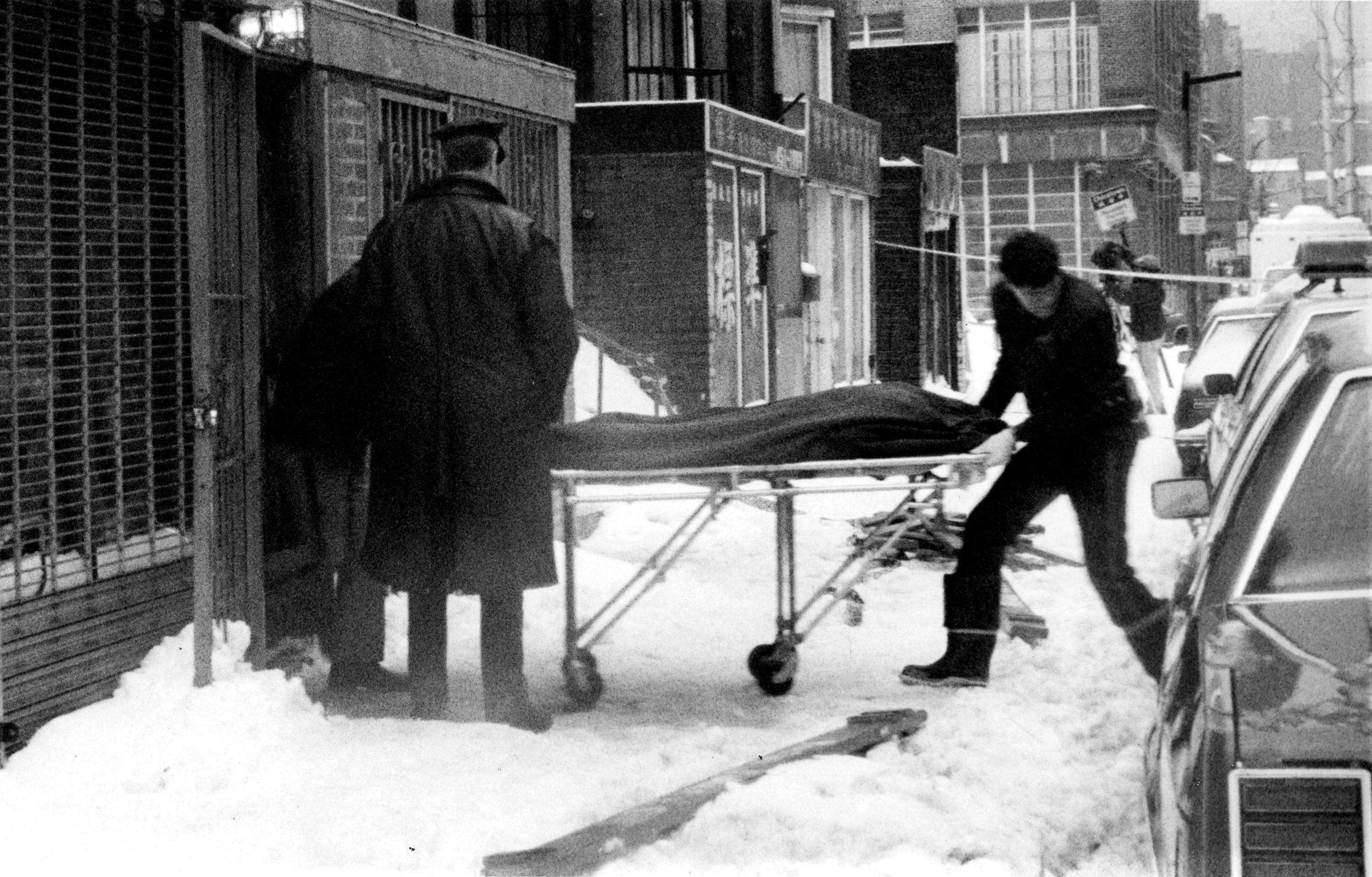
A victim is wheeled out of the gambling club on January 12th, 1991.

=== Escape ===
The three perpetrators, Pham, Tham, and Tran, drove to Atlantic City to gamble for a few days before escaping to Hong Kong on a United Airlines flight from Philadelphia International Airport via Tokyo three weeks after the massacre. During the trial, purchase records and passenger manifests for three round-trip airline tickets with consecutive serial numbers were produced; the first was in the name of "Nam The Tham", departing from John F. Kennedy Airport to Hong Kong via Narita on January 31, 1991; the second and third were for "Hung Tien Pham" and "Wah Tran", departing on February 1 with identical routing. All three tickets featured an open return date.

=== Investigation ===
Two days after the shooting, Lee identified the perpetrators for the police. Pham, Tham, and Tran were placed on Boston Police Department's Most Wanted list and featured in a spring 1991 episode of America's Most Wanted.

Two of the guns used were discarded on the club floor and Mahjong table after the shooting ended. Based on the shell casings, live ammunition, and bullets present, forensic experts concluded that Pham's gun (a .38 revolver) had been fired five times, another gun used by Van Tran (a .380 semiautomatic) had been fired four times and ejected three live rounds without firing, and a third gun (probably Tham's) had been fired three times and ejected three rounds without firing, but was not recovered from the scene. From the bullet fragments pulled from the victims, police concluded the third weapon also had been used to shoot some of the victims. The third weapon could have been another .380 semiautomatic, based on shell casings and live rounds that had been recovered which did not match the recovered .380. No fingerprints were recovered at the scene.

As the shooting had happened in his club, the police visited Young during the day of January 12; fearful for his life, Young denied being present that night and stated he had left the slain "Four Eyes" Son in charge. Young discontinued club operations and fled to Puerto Rico where he lived for three months.

=== Arrest and extradition ===
In 1998, the Federal Bureau of Investigation notified Chinese authorities that they believed that the suspects were in China. Later that year, Tran and Tham were arrested and held in prison in China on drug charges and undisclosed crimes respectively. A grand jury had indicted "Toothless Wah" Tran and "Ah Cheung" Tham for their roles in the massacre on June 29, 1999. After delicate negotiations, the Chinese authorities agreed to extradite the two men in exchange for Qin Hong, a fugitive wanted in China for millions of dollars of fraud, who was arrested in New York by the FBI in April 2001. Since China and the United States did not have an extradition agreement, the two men were extradited to Boston via Hong Kong through the Hong Kong–United States extradition agreement. Hong was first sent to China via Panama, after which Tham and Tran were deported to Hong Kong on October 19, 2001, and then extradited to the United States in December 2001.

After they arrived in Boston on December 22, Tran waived his Miranda rights and provided a tape-recorded statement with his version of the events of January 12, 1991.

=== Trials and convictions ===
The trial of Tham and Tran began on September 13, 2005. On October 5, they were each convicted for five counts of first degree murder and one count of armed assault with intent to murder, and sentenced to five consecutive life terms in prison, to be followed by a term of approximately 20 years for assault with intent to murder, then followed by a term of 5 years for possession of a firearm.

In January 2011, Tham and Tran appealed their convictions in the Massachusetts Supreme Judicial Court on the basis of prosecutor pressure on the juries and the use of unauthenticated airline flight records. On September 14, 2011, the Supreme Judicial Court rejected the appeals and upheld their convictions. At the September 2011 appeal ruling, Tran's lawyer commented that he could still fight his conviction in federal court.

In January 2017, Tham and Tran filed an appeal to the United States Court of Appeals for the First Circuit. The court affirmed the denial of habeas corpus relief. As of 2017, Hung Tien Pham has not been found despite a global hunt by the FBI. A new reward of US$30,000 was announced by the FBI on the 30th anniversary in January 2021 for information leading to his arrest. As of 2026, Pham had still not been found.

=== Reactions ===
Paul F. Evans, who was Boston Police Commissioner and investigated the scene at the time of the massacre, called it "one of the most violent crimes that I’ve seen in my 30 years with the department".

As retaliation for the death of "Dai Keung" Luu, San Francisco-based members of the Wo Hop To flew to Boston at Peter Chong's orders to murder Tan Ngo (aka Bai Ming or "Bike Ming"), Tse's lieutenant and putative leader of the Ping On in his absence. "Bike" Ming was the primary rival of Wayne Kwong for control of Boston Chinatown in the wake of the massacre on Tyler Street; Kwong in turn was serving Chong to bring Tien Ha Wui in control of Boston. The restaurant where Ming was to be assassinated was being guarded by police officers, and the would-be assassins were forced to abort their mission.

== See also ==
- Wah Mee massacre, a 1983 multiple homicide in Chinatown–International District, Seattle
- Golden Dragon massacre, a 1977 gang-related shooting in Chinatown, San Francisco
