= Wan Kuok-koi =

Macau triad leader (born 1955)

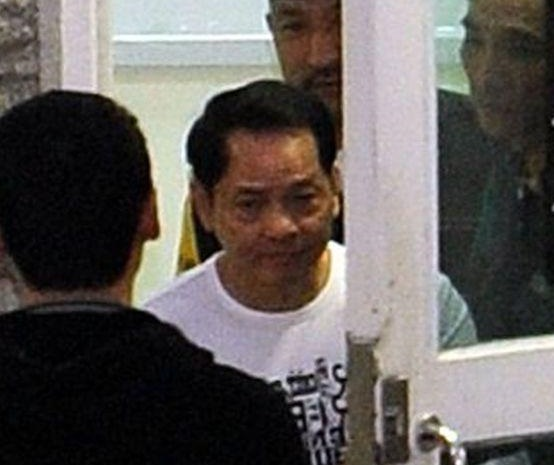
- Born: July 29, 1955 (age 71); Portuguese Macau
- Education: Lou Hau High School, Macau
- Occupation: Leader of 14K

Wan Kuok-koi (Chinese: 尹國駒; born 1955), popularly known as Broken Tooth Koi (崩牙駒), is a former leader of the Macau branch of the 14K triad. He was released after about 14 years in prison in December 2012. In the years since, he has reportedly been involved in illicit gambling and online fraud factories in Myanmar, associated with illicit drug production and transnational organized crime groups operating in and around the Golden Triangle in Southeast Asia. In December 2020, the U.S. sanctioned Wan under the Global Magnitsky Act.

== Early life and education ==
Wan had a tough childhood, growing up in the slums of Macau and fighting for his life on the streets before rising through the ranks of the 14K. His rise was accelerated by the arrival of another gangster, Ng Wai, whom he began to work for.

== Career ==
As Wan's position in the 14K got higher, Wai asked him to 'eliminate' his boss, Mo-Ding Ping, an assignment which Wan accepted, which provoked a year-long turf war, ending when Ping had to flee Macau to avoid a murder charge. Tension grew as Wai grew wary of Wan's high-profile persona. Teaming up with rival triad group the Shui Fong, a vicious turf war broke out in 1996 and 1997. In early 1997, an unsigned letter was sent to several newspapers in the area. It said: "Warning: From this day on it is forbidden to mention Broken Tooth Koi in the press; otherwise bullets will have no eyes, and knives and bullets will have no feelings."

In 1997, Wan briefly fled Macau to avoid two arrest warrants, one from a new anti-triad law enacted in Macau, and one for drug-trafficking from China. However, in August a Portuguese judge cleared Wan of all charges, and unexpectedly retired and moved back to Portugal the next day.

Wan then proceeded to attack Wai in public, putting up posters claiming he was a drug trafficker and declaring that anyone visiting Wai's casinos would become his enemy. Ultimately, Wan amassed enough power and influence and took over Wai's rackets completely. By this time he was earning $6 million a month from his legal gambling establishments.

=== Involvement in the film industry, 1997-1998 ===
In the autumn of 1997, Wan approached Hong Kong movie producer Henry Fong Ping to produce a film based on his life. The result was the 1998 movie Casino (aka Ho Kong Fung Wan) starring Simon Yam as Giant, a triad boss living the high life in the Macau underworld. Wan agreed to extensive research meetings to make the film as accurate as possible, as well as using his influence on Macau to help the crew film.

One of his most outrageous stunts was to close down the Macau-Taipa Bridge for some hours to allow filming of a crucial scene in the movie. The producers had asked the Macau Government for permission to film on the bridge, closing it to traffic, but permission was denied. Wan wanted the scene to be shot anyway, so he closed traffic from both sides of the bridge without any warning and the scene was filmed in this manner. Traffic to and from Macau was halted for around two hours. No local police intervention was made or any other measures by the Macau Government were taken to reopen the bridge to normal traffic flow, on what was then one of the two links between Macau mainland and Taipa-Coloane.

=== Arrest ===
In May 1998, a week before opening night, as he watched his own movie Casino, Wan was arrested and charged with illegal gambling, loan-sharking, criminal association, and the attempted murder of chief of police Antonio Marques Baptista with a car bomb.

In November 1999, in a landmark trial, he was convicted and jailed, along with eight associates including his brother Wan Kuok-hung. Wan was sentenced to 15 years in prison. All assets of the nine were confiscated. His jail term was later reduced to 13 years and 10 months.

Various reports have alleged that he was an associate of Tse Chi Lop, one of the world’s most-wanted alleged drug barons, who was arrested in Amsterdam in 2021 and later extradited to Australia.

=== Post-imprisonment: Southeast Asia, Hongmen and blockchain, 2012-present ===
Wan was released from prison on 1 December 2012 and soon re-entered the casino junkets business.

In October 2017, he was part of the initial coin offering of a cryptocurrency, Dragon Coin, by a Macau-based hotel and casino corporation, Macau Dragon Group, intended to serve mainland Chinese gamblers in Macau alongside the informal 'junket' system. The ICO reportedly raised US$320 million. The stated goals of Dragon Coin included leveraging blockchain technology in building a Chinese cultural town in Cambodia and organizing chess and poker tournaments in Hainan.

He founded and became chairman of The World Hongmen History and Culture Association, affiliated to the Hongmen, a fraternal Chinese cultural group with tens of thousands of members globally, as it expanded into Cambodia on the back of a surge of Chinese investment, both Belt and Road infrastructure and gambling-related. With the blessing of the Cambodian Government, in May 2018 he launched the organisation's headquarters there, saying "We will establish Hongmen schools in order to let foreigners and overseas Chinese study Chinese books, and to let foreigners read about [topics such as] loyalty, filial piety, benevolence, and justice."

The opening of the new Hongmen headquarters saw the launch of another cryptocurrency, HB ('Hongmen cryptocurrency'), with Wan saying he expected to issue one billion HB, each valued at one US Dollar. At the event he said he planned to invest in e-commerce, and to launch Hongmen-related watches, tea, hotels and casinos.

On 15 March 2020, Wan launched Saixigang (賽西港), a new development the Burmese border town of in Myawaddy, as chairman of the Dongmei Group. This became a base for crime syndicates that exited Sihanoukville, after Cambodia launched a crackdown in 2019. Wan signed the deal with the Kayin State Border Guard Force, made up of former rebels from the Democratic Karen Buddhist Army. The new site was used as a center for cybercrime, using imprisoned human-trafficked Chinese workers to run get-rich-quick scams. During the COVID-19 pandemic the center was remodeled as fraud factory.

In August 2020, Wan was appointed as chairman of Inix Technology Bhd, a publicly listed Malaysian technology company. In 2021, Malaysian police linked Wan to Nicky Liow, a Malaysian businessman who has been charged with multiple counts of money laundering.

On December 9, 2020, he and his company, Dongmei Group, were blacklisted by the US Department of Treasury for anti-corruption purposes. The Department of Treasury mentioned that it placed sanctions for World Hongmen History and Culture Association, said to a be a 14K Triad front.

As recently as 2024, Wan has been active in Laos and has been photographed visiting the Golden Triangle Special Economic Zone, a noted hub for transnational organized crime. Wan has also established a presence in the Pacific island nation of Palau.
