= Wo Shing Wo =

Hong Kong Wo Group triad society

- Founded: 1930
- Founding location: Sham Shui Po, Hong Kong
- Years active: 1930–present
- Territory: Hong Kong, Macau, People's Republic of China, and Chinese communities globally
- Ethnicity: Majority Chinese and Vietnamese, Minority Thai, Korean, British, and American
- Membership: Unknown
- Criminal activities: Drug trafficking; arms trafficking; arson; fraud; prostitution; human trafficking; identity theft; money laundering; extortion; assassinations; illegal immigration; kidnapping; racketeering
- Allies: Big Circle Gang
- Rivals: 14K; Ah Kong; Sun Yee On; Wo On Lok

14K
- Traditional Chinese: 和勝和
- Simplified Chinese: 和胜和
Transcriptions
Standard Mandarin
- Hanyu Pinyin: Héshènghé
Yue: Cantonese
- Yale Romanization: Wòh-sing-wòh
- Jyutping: wo^{4} sing^{3} wo^{4}

Wo Shing Wo or WSW (Chinese: 和勝和; Jyutping: wo4 sing3 wo4) is the oldest of the Wo Group triad societies, and is the triad with the longest history in Hong Kong. According to the Hong Kong police, the triad is involved in extortion, drug trafficking, gambling and prostitution.

Wo Shing Wo was established in Sham Shui Po in 1930. While maintaining its traditional stronghold in Tsuen Wan, it has extended its influence to Tsim Sha Tsui and Mong Kok. It also operates in Tai Po, Sheung Shui and Fanling. The group continues to use the old Hongmen Secret Society initiating ceremony for newly recruited members.

== History ==
=== Early ===
The Wo Shing Wo triad was established in Sham Shui Po, Hong Kong in 1930. Like most Chinese triads, the organization's roots date back to secret societies founded during the Ming and Qing dynasties. During the Japanese occupation of Hong Kong from 1941 to 1945, the Wo Shing Wo collaborated with the occupational government. Due to the post-World War II continuation of the Chinese Civil War, numerous refugees from China fled to Hong Kong, many of whom were recruited into the Wo Shing Wo. By the 1950s, the total Wo Shing Wo membership had expanded from roughly 15,000 to approximately 70,000.

As the United Kingdom prepared for the handover of Hong Kong back to the People's Republic of China, Wo Shing Wo redefined their organisation to prepare for their murky operations in mainland China. WSW split into six separate regional forces in Hong Kong—500 fully armed members in North Territories, hawkers in Sham Shui Po, love hotels in Jordan, with groups in Tsuen Wan, Wanchai and a new branch across the border in Shenzhen (1997).

In 2001, Wo Shing Wo traded drugs in discos and bars with Judi Fong and religious communities, promising that drugs can enhance religious experiences through visions and hallucinations. By 2005 WSW has become Hong Kong's No.1 drug trafficker. WSW's drug dealing activities and key criminal activities spread to China, Japan, Thailand and Australia. WSW is involved in various criminal activities and some of Hong Kong's politicians and businessmen are suspected to be supporters of the Triad group. WSW is split into two main forces, one based in Macau and another in Shenzhen. WSW began to emerge in Europe.

By 2006 Wo Shing Wo has control over the secondhand market in Hong Kong, including mobile phones, electronic appliances, stolen cars and exchange of weaponry at Mong Kok. Wo Shing Wo members are attacked by members of Wo on Lok. Firearms are used and many are hurt. Wo Shing Wo raises crime rate in Chinatown, London, United Kingdom.

In 2014, the Triad was thought by police to be responsible for the brutal stabbing on 26 February of Kevin Lau, a journalist known for his tough reporting on China, who had been fired from his position as the editor of the Ming Pao newspaper. The attack took place three days after thousands of people had demonstrated for press freedom, as a result of the dismissal. and was carried out by an assailant riding pillion on a motorbike, which had been stolen in Fanling.

=== Minibus racket ===
From 2006 to at least 2010, the group controlled three red minibus routes and was extorting at least HK$14 million a year as protection fees from 30 drivers. Former group Dragonhead "Broken Mouth Bun", who, police say, is the leader of the group running the Tsuen Wan – Kwun Tong route, was arrested and bailed on 21 March 2010 in connection with the scheme. On each route, about 30 drivers pay at least HK$10,000 a month as a "protection fee" to the Wo Shing Wo. The WSW then make sure no other driver could run the routes, leaving the drivers able to earn HK$10,000 and HK$20,000 a month. Three other minibus routes running between Tsuen Wan and Kowloon East – Choi Hung, Tsz Wan Shan and Ngau Tau Kok – are controlled by another Wo Shing Wo leader.

== International activity ==
=== Australia ===
A 1992 internal report by the Asian division of the Victoria Police documented Wo Shing Wo activity in Melbourne. The group is involved in the importation of heroin into Australia from Southeast Asia, as well as illegal gambling, illegal prostitution, extortion, immigration malpractice and money laundering. Chinese criminal groups are the primary wholesalers of heroin in Australia; street-level distribution in Melbourne is mainly outsourced to Vietnamese and Romanian groups.

=== Belgium ===
The Wo Shing Wo has a presence in Antwerp, where it is active in heroin trafficking, money laundering, gambling and illegal workshops. The group also uses Belgium as a transit port for illegal immigrants.

=== Canada ===
The Wo Shing Wo was established in Toronto in 1930 as an international branch of the Wo Hop To, which had been founded in 1908. The Wo Shing Wo deal cocaine to the people in Hong Kong Kowloon and Macau. Their leader Wong Ying Ding was killed and now they are with no leader.

=== France ===
The Wo Shing Wo is among five triad groups active in France. These gangs cooperate with Albanian and Turkish groups in the importation of heroin from the Golden Triangle.

=== Ireland ===
The Wo Shing Wo is active in Dublin and Cork. Triads gained a firm foothold in Ireland in the 1980s, when large numbers of Chinese restaurants opened in these cities. Leaked diplomatic cables obtained by the Irish Independent in 2011 included intelligence reports by the Garda Síochána (Irish police) on Chinese organized crime in the country, specifically the activities of the Wo Shing Wo and their rival 14K. The reported criminal activities of the triads included the trafficking of women and children from China into Ireland, involvement in casinos, and money laundering. Gardaí also reported a great deal of interaction between the Chinese gangs operating in Ireland and Scotland. In March 2002, four self-confessed Wo Shing Wo members were deported from Ireland after being involved in several assaults and robberies in Dublin. Eight people believed to be working for the Wo Shing Wo, including a senior member of the gang, were arrested after local gardaí and members of the Garda National Drug Unit raided cannabis-growing operations at two homes in Drumshambo, County Leitrim in March 2009. In November 2012, 113 mostly Chinese and Vietnamese nationals were arrested in raids on 236 properties, suspected of growing, smuggling and selling cannabis in Ireland. Many of those arrested were believed to be connected to the Wo Shing Wo and operating under the orders of gang leaders in the UK.

=== Netherlands ===
The Wo Shing Wo branch in the Netherlands was founded and primarily operates in Rotterdam. In the 1970s, the group battled the 14K and Ah Kong for control of the heroin trade in Amsterdam. In addition to heroin trafficking, the group also operates gambling, prostitution, money laundering, loan sharking, robbery, extortion and human trafficking. The Wo Shing Wo has more recently also closely cooperated with the 14K.

=== South Africa ===
Since the mid-1980s, the Wo Shing Wo has been one of four Hong Kong triad groups operating in South Africa, predominantly in Johannesburg and Cape Town. Acting independently from the Hong Kong branch, the group's activities in the country include fraud, drug trafficking, firearms smuggling, extortion, money laundering, prostitution, illegal gambling, the smuggling of illegal immigrants, tax evasion, and the large-scale importing of counterfeit goods. The Wo Shing Wo was formerly heavily involved in the illegal harvesting and exportation of abalone (in 2000, the estimated gross income from the illegal exportation of abalone to Hong Kong was US$32 million).

=== United Kingdom ===
The Wo Shing Wo operates in London, Manchester, Portsmouth, Birmingham, Liverpool and Glasgow. Authorities believe the Wo Shing Wo is the largest triad group in the country. Beginning in the late 1980s, the Wo Shing Wo has been involved in the distribution in the United Kingdom of heroin and counterfeit goods from Hong Kong and Southeast Asia. The group has also been involved in conflicts with rival triad gangs over control of the stores selling pirated videos originating in China. The Wo Shing Wo in Scotland has cooperated with the 14K in cigarette smuggling.

Restaurant owner and alleged Shui Fong "white paper fan" (business adviser) Philip Wong was murdered by a gang of contract killers armed with machetes in Glasgow on 9 October 1985. It is believed Wong was murdered after refusing to do business with the Wo Shing Wo who wanted a share of his lucrative Chinese video rental business. Three men wanted for the murder have never been traced. In February 1999, Wo Shing Wo member and former Glasgow brothel manager Tony Yeung was jailed for his part in a multi-million-pound fake credit card scam. Wo Shing Wo footsoldiers ambushed 14K members in a machete attack on Glasgow's Sauchiehall Street in July 2003 in a dispute over the control of protection rackets. Wo Shing Wo members Jerome Castrillo, Ryan Parker-Saunders, Yu Xiang Liu, and Cho Wei Leong were convicted of the November 2007 murder of drug dealer Michael McGrath at the Old Bailey in November 2008. McGrath had allowed the gang to stash crack cocaine and heroin at his Carshalton home but was beaten to death after he began helping himself to the drugs. In January 2013, four men – Yik Fung Ng, Hiu Nelson Yeung, Chiu Yuen Li, and Siu Hung Yeung – associated with the Wo Shing Wo but who denied being members of the group were convicted of violent disorder following a street fight involving up to thirty men in Manchester's Chinatown in June 2010. During the trial, it was alleged that one side of the conflict included Wo Shing Wo members and associates who had bullied young men who socialised in Chinatown into paying to join their ranks, and that the violence erupted because a group of young men had refused.

== Dragonhead ==
The Wo Shing Wo dragonhead is elected every two years.

=== Dragonheads of Wo Shing Wo ===
- 'Inch Brother' (real name: Cheung Chung-wing), born 1974. In office: 2016-unknown (currently is considered as a fugitive by HKPD)
- 'Shanghai Tsai' (Shanghai Boy) (real name: Kwok Wing-hung). Dates unknown. Became widely known in March 2012, after it was revealed that he attended a dinner with some election aides of Hong Kong Chief Executive candidate CY Leung.
- 'Broken Mouth Bun' (real name: Poon), born c. 1962. In office: 2008–2010;
- 'Shu Tsai' ('Tsai' = 'boy'). In office from 2010.

=== 2013 Raid of Dragonhead election in Shenzhen ===
On March 28, 2013, after they received intel Wo Shing Wo triad members meeting at restaurant in Futian District for what was reportedly a dragonhead election, the Shenzhen Municipal Public Security Bureau dispatched over 350 SWAT officers and arrested over 160 triad members in a joint operation with the HKPF, who also arrested 63 triad members in Hong Kong. According to the HKPF, this was the result of an over 9 month long undercover operation.
