= Ping On =

Defunct triad syndicate based in Boston

- Founded: 1970s
- Founder: Stephen "Sky Dragon" Tse
- Founding location: Boston, Massachusetts, United States
- Years active: 1970s–early 2000s
- Territory: Boston
- Ethnicity: Chinese
- Leader: Stephen Tse
- Activities: Drug trafficking, arms trafficking, fraud, prostitution, human trafficking, illegal gambling, money laundering, extortion, murder, illegal immigration, and racketeering
- Allies: 14K, Hung Mong
- Rivals: Wo Hop To, Vietnamese Boston Crew
- Notable members: Stephen Tse, John Willis

The Ping On (Chinese: 平安; Jyutping: ping4 on1; lit. 'peaceful', 'at ease') was a Boston-based criminal organization. The organization rose to power in the 1970s and continued to operate throughout the 1980s, 1990s and early 2000s. The Ping On was founded by Stephen "Sky Dragon" Tse who had heavy ties to the infamous 14K Triad in Hong Kong.

== History ==
The Ping On was regarded as a "farm team" for the 14K triad in Hong Kong. The ambition of Stephen Tse was to come to Boston to set up another hub on the East Coast of the United States. However, it was not directly affiliated with 14K despite Stephen Tse having a history with them. The organization had several allies in the late 1980s, including the Hung Mong which was in operation in New York City.

=== Decline ===
In 1984, Stephen Tse was jailed for refusing to cooperate with authorities in regards to Asian organized crime in the city. During this time, a large number of Vietnamese refugees had moved to Boston, in particular Chinatown. When Stephen Tse was released from jail in 1986, the landscape of organized crime was very different, and not nearly as one sided as it was when he was last free. The power vacuum left by the decline of Ping On was linked by early police reports to the Boston Chinatown massacre, which later FBI investigations revealed to be perpetrated by Ping On members and related to a feud with a rival gang member.
