= Lei King Wan (constituency) =

Hong Kong constituency

- 鯉景灣
- Elected constituency for the Eastern District Council
- Boundary of Lei King Wan in Eastern District
- District: Eastern
- Legislative Council constituency: Hong Kong Island East
- Population: 20,553 (2019)
- Electorate: 10.089 (2019)

Current constituency
- Created: 1994
- Number of members: One
- Member: Vacant

Lei King Wan (Chinese: 鯉景灣) is one of the 35 constituencies in the Eastern District of Hong Kong.

The constituency returns one district councillor to the Eastern District Council, with an election every four years. The seat was last held by Alice Wei Siu-lik.

Lei King Wan has estimated population of 20,553.

== Councillors represented ==
Election	Member	Party	%
1994	Alexander Fu Yuen-cheung	Independent	67.88
1999	Alexander Fu Yuen-cheung	Independent→Progressive Alliance	60.70
2003	Alexander Fu Yuen-cheung	Progressive Alliance→Independent	N/A
2007	Alexander Fu Yuen-cheung	Independent	44.65
2011	Alexander Fu Yuen-cheung	Independent	59.80
2015	Yeung Sze-chun	Independent	41.96
2019	Alice Wei Siu-lik→Vacant (Note: Disqualified on 15 September 2021 after her oath was invalid.)	Independent	57.22

== Election results ==
=== 2010s ===
Eastern District Council Election, 2019: Lei King Wan
Party	Candidate	Votes	%	±%
Ind. democrat	Alice Wei Siu-lik	4,144	57.22	
Nonpartisan	Cheung Man-sung	3,098	42.78	
Majority		1,046	14.44	
Turnout		7,269	72.06	
Ind. democrat gain from Independent		Swing		

Eastern District Council Election, 2015: Lei King Wan
Party	Candidate	Votes	%	±%
Independent	Yeung Sze-chun	2,008	41.96	
Labour	Wong Huk-kam	1,612	33.68	
Independent	Alexander Fu Yuen-cheung	955	19.95	−39.85
Nonpartisan	Paul Ho Chiu-kwong	211	4.41	
Majority		396	8.28	
Turnout		4,786	51.36	
Independent gain from Independent		Swing		

Eastern District Council Election, 2011: Lei King Wan
Party	Candidate	Votes	%	±%
Independent	Alexander Fu Yuen-cheung	1,932	59.80	+15.15
Democratic	Yim Ka-wing	1,299	40.20	−2.18
Majority		633	19.60	
Turnout		3,231	34.86	
Independent hold		Swing		

=== 2000s ===
Eastern District Council Election, 2007: Lei King Wan
Party	Candidate	Votes	%	±%
Independent	Alexander Fu Yuen-cheung	1,335	44.65	
Democratic	Patrick Chow Muook-bill	1,291	43.18	
Independent	Paul Ho Chiu-kwong	364	12.17	
Majority		44	1.47	
Independent hold		Swing		

Eastern District Council Election, 2003: Lei King Wan
Party	Candidate	Votes	%	±%
HKPA	Alexander Fu Yuen-cheung	uncontested		
HKPA hold		Swing		

=== 1990s ===
Eastern District Council Election, 1999: Lei King Wan
Party	Candidate	Votes	%	±%
Independent	Alexander Fu Yuen-cheung	1,356	60.70	−7.18
Nonpartisan	Chiang Ip-fai	878	39.30	
Majority		478	21.40	
Independent hold		Swing		

Eastern District Board Election, 1994: Lei King Wan
Party	Candidate	Votes	%	±%
Nonpartisan	Alexander Fu Yuen-cheung	1,549	67.88	
LDF	Chan Ming-kit	733	32.12	
Majority		816	35.76	
Nonpartisan win (new seat)				
