= John Willis (gangster) =

American mobster

- Born: May 11, 1971 (age 55); Dorchester, Boston, Massachusetts, U.S.
- Other name: "Bac Guai John"
- Status: Incarcerated at USP Canaan
- Allegiance: Ping On
- Convictions: Drug trafficking (2000); Drug trafficking, money laundering (2013)
- Penalty: Five years' imprisonment (2000); Twenty years' imprisonment (2013)

John Willis (born May 11, 1971), nicknamed Bac Guai John in Cantonese, or White Devil John, is an American mobster linked with the Chinese mafia in Boston and New York. Willis claims to have been the only white person within Chinese organized crime, an assertion backed by FBI agent Scott O'Donnell, who stated he has "never seen" a case like that of Willis.

== Early life ==
Willis was raised by his mother in Dorchester in the 1970s. His father left the family when John was 2 years old. Following his mother's sudden death when he was 14, Willis was left to live by himself.

== Criminal career ==
While working as a bouncer at a bar in Boston frequented by Chinese crime figures, Willis intervened in a fight on the behalf of Chinese gangster, Vapeng "John" Joe. As thanks, Joe gave Willis a card with a number written on it and told Willis to call if he ever needed anything. Soon, broke and needing a place to stay, Willis called the number. He was taken to a home occupied by the Chinese gang Ping On. Multiple reports state that Willis was then "adopted" by a Chinese family linked to the gang.

=== New York ===
After being initiated into gang life in Boston, Willis was sent to New York to act as a bodyguard and bagman for a Chinese gangster in the city. While in New York, Willis began to learn Chinese (Cantonese and Toisanese dialects) as a way to pick up Asian women, eventually becoming fluent. His language skills were crucial to his rise within the Chinese organized crime hierarchy. Willis eventually also learned Vietnamese.

=== Return to Boston ===
In the 1990s, Willis was sent back to Boston to work for a mid-level gangster named Bai Ming. However, a Chinese turf war broke out which resulted in Bai Ming being the most important gangster left standing in Boston's Chinatown. Willis, by virtue of being Bai Ming's second in command, saw his status in Chinese organized crime skyrocket.

== Prison ==
Willis was convicted and jailed for extortion and then, in 2000, received a five–year sentence for dealing heroin. While in prison, Willis organized an Oxycontin trafficking ring from Florida to Massachusetts. Upon his release from prison, he became heavily involved in drug dealing and money laundering against the wishes of his Chinese organized crime peers.

In August 2013, Willis was convicted of drug trafficking and money laundering for his role in the $4 million Oxycontin drug ring. He received a 20-year sentence. Willis is currently serving his sentence at Canaan USP with a projected release date of 06/10/2028.

== In media ==
In 2013 Warner Bros was developing White Devil, a movie based on Willis' life. James Gray was attached to write and direct the feature. BenBella Books released the true crime book White Devil by Bob Halloran on January 12, 2016, detailing the story of Willis.
