= Sun Yee On =

Hong Kong-founded triad

- Founded: 1919; 107 years ago
- Founding location: British Hong Kong
- Years active: 1919–present
- Territory: Chaozhou, Mainland China, Hong Kong, Mainland China, Japan, France, South Africa, United Kingdom, India, Thailand, Korea, Colombia, Canada, United States, Australia, Central America
- Ethnicity: Chinese
- Membership: 25,000
- Activities: racketeering, counterfeiting, extortion, drug trafficking, money laundering, murder, illegal gambling
- Allies: Wo Hop To, Wo On Lok, Albanian mafia, Camorra, Serbian mafia, American Mafia, Sinaloa Cartel
- Rivals: 14K, Wah Ching, Wo Shing Wo

Sun Yee On

Chinese name
- Traditional Chinese: 新義安
- Simplified Chinese: 新义安
Transcriptions
Standard Mandarin
- Hanyu Pinyin: Xīnyì'ān
Yue: Cantonese
- Yale Romanization: sàn yih òn
- Jyutping: san1 ji6 on1

Vietnamese name
- Vietnamese: Tân Nghĩa An

Sun Yee On (Chinese: 新義安; Jyutping: san^{1} ji^{6} on^{1}; Cantonese Yale: sān yih ōn) is one of the leading triads in Hong Kong and mainland China. It has more than 25,000 members worldwide. It is also believed to be active in the UK, the United States, France, and Belgium.

== History ==
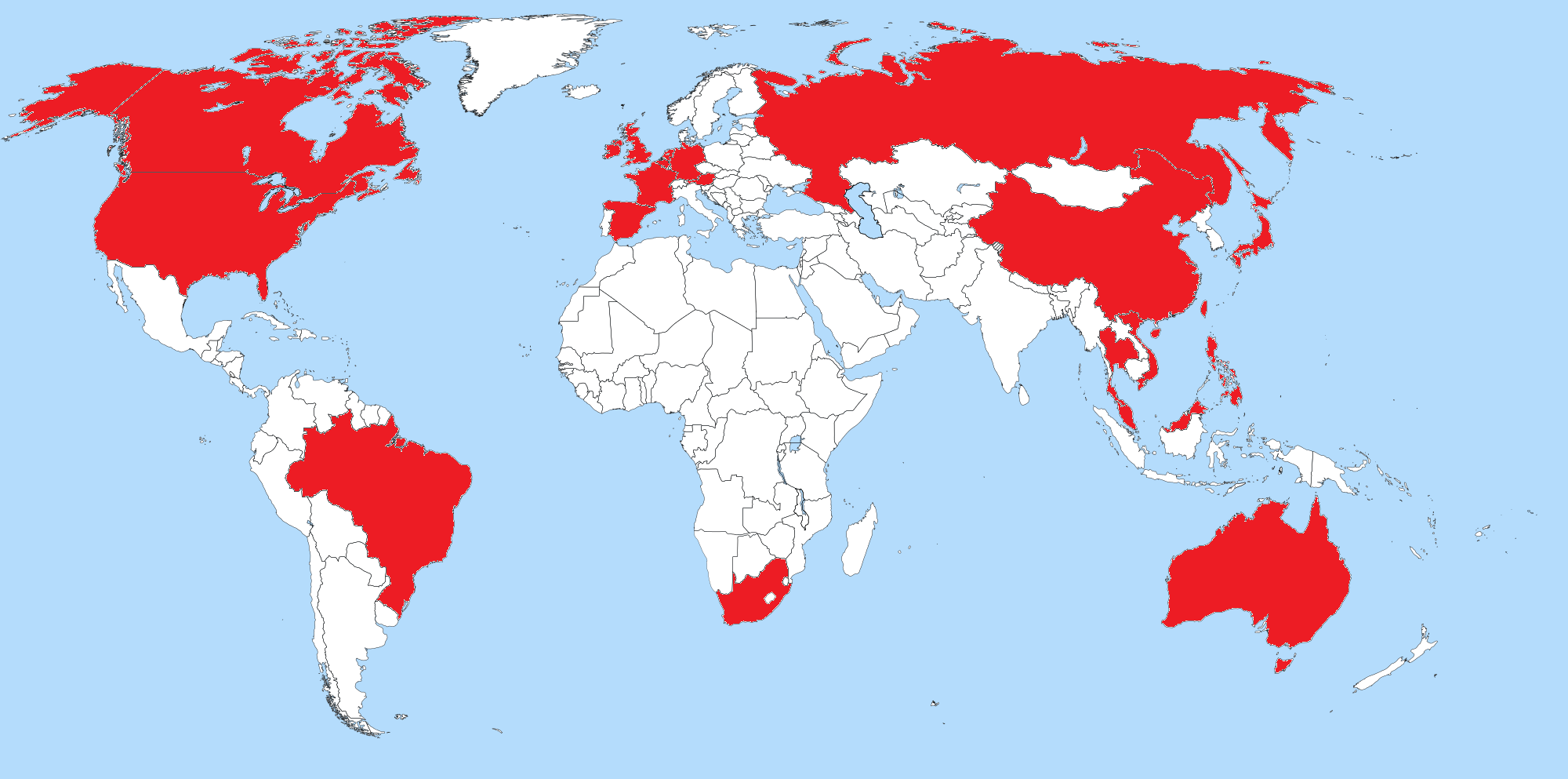
Map of countries with branches or operations of Sun Yee On reported by law enforcement or in the news.

Sun Yee On was founded by Heung Chin, originally from Teochew (Chaozhou), in 1919. Yee On (Chinese: 義安; Jyutping: ji^{6} on^{1}; Cantonese Yale: yih ōn) is a historical name for Chaozhou. Mainly through ethnic Chinese diaspora, it is thought to extend to the United States, Canada, Thailand, Australia, South Africa and Central America. Chin was deported to Taiwan in the early 1950s. His eldest son, Heung Wah-yim, who ostensibly worked as a law clerk, allegedly took over Sun Yee On in his place. The triad is also noted as being founded by "Teochew and Hokkien immigrants" to Hong Kong.

=== 1980s spill ===
In February 1986, a former Hong Kong police officer, Anthony Chung, who had become a member of Sun Yee On, asked the police for protection. He identified Heung Wah-yim as the leader of the triad, and this led to the police arresting eleven members of the Triad on 1 April 1987. Whilst searching Heung Wah-yim's law office, they found a list of 900 numbered names, which appeared to be a membership list of Sun Yee On. In October, Heung Wah-yim was brought to trial, along with five accomplices who all pleaded guilty. Heung Wah-yim professed his innocence throughout the trial, claiming to be the president of a local chapter of the Lions Club and that the list found in his office consisted of potential donors. Chung and another former member were the main prosecution witnesses. On 20 January 1988, the jury found five of the defendants guilty, including Heung Wah-yim who was sentenced to seven and a half years in prison, acquitting the sixth.

Heung Wah-yim (Chinese: 向華炎; born 20 November 1932, died 23 December 2025, at St. Teresa's Hospital). He rose to prominence in the 1980s when he was alleged to be the leader ("Dragon Head") of the Sun Yee On triad society. In 1988, he was convicted on triad-related charges in a case once considered a landmark; however, in 1990, his conviction was overturned on appeal due to insufficient evidence and the improper admission of certain evidence. After being acquitted, he turned to legitimate business activities, notably supporting his brother's film career, and became a respected businessman/philanthropist. His life presents a complex picture: on one hand, controversial due to his alleged past; on the other, respected for his later philanthropic work and the successful, yet ironically contrasting, professional achievements of his children.

Early Life and Education

Heung Wah-yim was born into a prominent family in Kowloon City, Hong Kong, the eldest of thirteen children born to Heung Chin (向前) and his first wife, Yip Ching (葉清). Heung Chin founded the Sun Yee On society in 1919. Heung Wah-yim's mother died when he was eight, and as the eldest son, he assumed family responsibilities early.

He received a quality education, attending the prestigious La Salle College in Kowloon Tong, where he excelled academically and was also an outstanding athlete, particularly in swimming, winning multiple inter-school championships. He maintained this hobby throughout his life, swimming daily at the Hong Kong Jockey Club even into his eighties.

Heung initially aspired to become a doctor, but after his father was deported by the colonial government to Taiwan, he abandoned his medical aspirations and instead took over and managed the family's growing triad affairs.

Business Career and Brotherly Support

Heung Wah-yim also built a successful career in finance, operating his own financial company. In the 1990s, he invested in Macau's gaming and entertainment industry alongside his younger brother, the renowned film producer and actor Charles Heung (向華強).

He was extremely close to his brother Charles and was a key supporter of his film ventures. In the 1990s, he provided crucial funding and strategic support for Charles's film production company, China Star Entertainment, which later became a mainstay of Hong Kong cinema, producing numerous classic films.

Furthermore, he was actively involved in social affairs. As a member of Lions Clubs International, he served as president of a local chapter and made generous donations to various community projects. His philanthropy extended to mainland China, where he funded the construction of a school in his father's hometown in Guangdong province, naming it after his father.

Alleged Triad Leadership Charges and Trial

In the mid-1980s, during a major crackdown on organised crime in Hong Kong, Heung Wah-yim became a primary target. A key police informant, Anthony Chung, identified Heung as the then Dragon Head of the Sun Yee On, one of Hong Kong's largest and most powerful triad societies.

On 1 April 1987, the Royal Hong Kong Police Force raided Heung Wah-yim's law firm, seizing a large volume of documents, including a list containing approximately 900 names. The prosecution alleged this was a triad membership roster; Heung and his defence team maintained it was merely a list of potential donors and contacts for a Lions Club chapter.

Heung Wah-yim and five other defendants were arrested and tried in 1987, in what became one of Hong Kong's largest and most high-profile organised crime trials at the time. On 20 January 1988, Heung was convicted and sentenced to seven and a half years in prison.

Appeal and Overturned Conviction

After serving two years, the Hong Kong Court of Appeal of the Supreme Court of Hong Kong unanimously overturned Heung Wah-yim's conviction in 1990. The appeal judgment was critical of the prosecution's case. The main grounds for appeal included:

- The court ruled that the evidence from police expert witnesses regarding the connection between the seized items (the list, lai see packets, printing blocks) and Sun Yee On rituals was improperly admitted. These experts failed to demonstrate a sufficient basis for their opinions, leaving the prosecution without reliable evidence linking the items to triads.
- The trial judge misdirected the jury by stating that the testimonies of accomplice witnesses could corroborate each other. However, the law requires independent evidence to corroborate accomplice testimony.
- Whether the consent of the Attorney General was required for prosecution under Section 26(1) of the Societies Ordinance (Cap. 151). The majority of judges held it was not required, but one judge dissented, arguing that the conviction was invalid without such consent.

Upon his release from the Court of Appeal that year, Heung simply responded to reporters' questions with "The law is just", before leaving to reunite with his family for tea.

Years later, Heung Wah-yim appeared again at the now Hong Kong High Court, this time not for a trial, but to celebrate his son and daughter formally beginning their legal careers at their admission ceremonies.

Later Life and Philanthropy

After his release, Heung consistently and publicly distanced himself from past organized crime allegations, focusing on family and business development, and continuing to support his brother's entertainment projects.

He became a significant philanthropist, donating to educational institutions, cultural projects, and social welfare programs in Hong Kong and Taiwan. He also remained a regular at the Hong Kong Jockey Club, maintained his daily swimming routine, and was active in business social circles.

Personal Life

Heung Wah-yim had two marriages. With his first wife—the aunt of Royal Hong Kong Police Sergeant-Major Lui Lok (呂樂)—he had several children. In the late 1970s, within Hong Kong's film circles, he met former Taiwanese actress Christine Li, whom he later married. After moving to Hong Kong, his wife gradually retreated from public view, dedicating herself fully to the family.

In his later years, he maintained a low profile, enjoying family life and often dining with them at five-star hotels in Tsim Sha Tsui. Though his life became more subdued, he remained respected both within and outside his social circles.

His children pursued diverse and distinguished professional paths:

- Heung Chin-wai (向展偉): Son from his first marriage, a practicing solicitor in Hong Kong, currently a consultant at Hampton, Winter and Glynn. Due to his family background, media speculation once suggested him as a potential successor to the Sun Yee On, but there is no evidence of any involvement in illegal activities. Today, with his composed professional demeanour and low-key style, he stands as an example within the family of earning societal respect through talent and hard work.
- Heung Wing-yan (Mina) (向詠茵): His daughter, formerly a practicing criminal defence barrister in Hong Kong. Her choice of criminal defence work, given her father's legal history, attracted some public controversy and media attention. She trained under renowned Senior Counsel and former Hong Kong Bar Association Chairman Philip Dykes and served as a member of the International Committee of the Bar Council of England and Wales. She is now a practicing member of London's Whitestone Chambers, focusing on human rights and the family's overseas cases.
- Heung Chin-kit (Edfeel) (向展傑): An alumnus of Hong Kong's traditional elite school La Salle College, he later graduated with honors from the University of Hong Kong. Leveraging sharp business acumen and exceptional taste, he founded the high-end lifestyle and jewelry brand "Leef." His brand has not only become a top choice for local celebrities and collectors but has also successfully entered overseas markets.

=== Historical Assessment ===
Heung Wah-yim remains a controversial figure in Hong Kong's social history. Some view him as a symbol of the alleged infiltration of triad influence into upper echelons of business and society; others see him as a man wrongly accused, who ultimately overcame a miscarriage of justice to become a successful businessman and philanthropist. The development of his children in fields as diverse as law and luxury goods adds contemporary layers to his legendary life. His appeal case—The Queen v Chan Kai & Others—remains an important reference precedent in Hong Kong for evidence law and the prosecution of organised crime.

=== 2000s ===
The triad operates several vice establishments in Tsim Sha Tsui and Yau Ma Tei, or at least did in November 2010 when a 29-year-old alleged office-bearer or "red pole" of the triad, named "Sai B" Chan, was arrested for triad offences and money laundering.

Lee Tai-lung (李泰龍), a Sun Yee On boss in Tsim Sha Tsui, was murdered in front of the Kowloon Shangri-La hotel on 4 August 2009 by members of the Wo Shing Wo gang. It was supposedly a revenge attack ordered by Leung Kwok-chung, a senior member of a Wo Shing Wo crew in Tai Kok Tsui who was injured by Lee during a bar fight in July 2006 in Prat Avenue. Following Lee's death, three of his former followers stepped in to defend his lucrative entertainment empire from other triads. In 2011(?), Lee's three followers were tracked by "Ko Tat", another "red pole" in Wan Chai, who failed to spread his influence across the harbour. Tai Hau, leader of another Sun Yee On faction active in Tuen Mun, tried to encroach upon Lee's West Kowloon and Tsim Sha Tsui operations. His attempts were thwarted by an undercover police operation, as a result of which 222 people were arrested in January 2012. The Organised Crime and Triad Bureau suspects that "Ko Chun" may be the latest kingpin of Lee's original turf.

On 22 March 2012, police arrested 102 members of Sun Yee On in Shenzhen, China.

== In popular culture ==
- In the anime adaptation of Black Lagoon, the Thai branch of Sun Yee On, led by a man named Wan, is based in the fictional city of Roanapur and competes with the other organised crime syndicates in the city like the 14K.
- The 2012 video game Sleeping Dogs focuses on Wei Shen, an undercover police officer transferred from San Francisco to Hong Kong and the HKPD as part of a joint operation to infiltrate the "Sun On Yee", inspired by the Sun Yee On, and eliminate or incarcerate their most powerful members.

== See also ==
- Charles Heung and Jimmy Heung – Heung Chin's other sons and involved in activities outside of Sun Yee On.
- List of Chinese criminal organizations
- Crime in Hong Kong
- Crime in China
