= Triad (organised crime) =

Chinese transnational organised crime syndicate

- 三合會 / 三合会
- Named after: Union of Heaven, Earth, and Man, Chinese mythology, and traditional Chinese folk religion customs
- Founding location: Canton, Hong Kong, Macau
- Territory: Mainland China, Hong Kong, Macau, Southeast Asia, Japan, South Korea, Taiwan, North America, Brazil, Argentina, Peru, Australia, New Zealand, Canada, United Kingdom, France, Italy, Netherlands, Belgium, Germany, Spain, Romania, Bulgaria, Russia, and South Africa
- Ethnicity: Han Chinese
- Activities: Extortion, protection, murder, assault, racketeering, human trafficking, sex trafficking, illegal gambling, loan sharking, counterfeiting, copyright infringement, kidnapping, robbery, Chinese film and music industries, (Note: Including Hong Kong film and music industries, and also Taiwanese Film and music industries) drug trafficking, money laundering, arms trafficking, health care fraud and immigration fraud

A triad is a Chinese transnational organised crime syndicate based in Greater China with outposts in various countries having significant overseas Chinese populations.

The triads originated from secret societies formed in the 18th and 19th centuries, some influenced by white lotus societies of the 14th century, with the intent of overthrowing the minority Manchu-ruling Qing dynasty. In the Republican era of early 20th century, triads were enlisted by the Nationalist regime to attack political enemies, including assassinations. Following the foundation of the People's Republic of China and subsequent crackdowns by the Chinese Communist Party, triads and their operations retreated and relocated to Hong Kong, Macau and overseas Chinese communities. Since the Reform and Opening Up period, triads and other triad-like criminal organisations re-emerged in mainland China. In modern times, triads have been widely alleged to have connections to the government of the People's Republic of China.

== Etymology ==
Sanhehui
- Traditional Chinese: 三合會
- Simplified Chinese: 三合会
- Literal meaning: Three Harmonies Society
Transcriptions
Standard Mandarin
- Hanyu Pinyin: Sān Hé Huì
- Wade–Giles: San^{1}-he^{2}-hui^{4}
Yue: Cantonese
- Yale Romanization: Sāam hahp wúi
- Jyutping: Saam^{1} Hap^{6} Wui^{2}
Southern Min
- Hokkien POJ: Saⁿ-ha̍p-hōe
- Tâi-lô: Sann-ha̍p-huē

According to the Oxford English Dictionary, "triad" is a translation of the Chinese term San He Hui (三合會), referring to the union of heaven, earth, and humanity. Another theory posits that the word "triad" was coined by British officials in colonial Hong Kong as a reference to the triads' use of triangular imagery. This theory however is highly improbable as the term "Triad" had been used by William Milne to describe secret societies in Southern China as early as 1826, well before the colony was even formed. It has been speculated that triad organisations took after, or were originally part of, militant movements such as the White Lotus, the Taiping and Boxer Rebellions, and the Heaven and Earth Society.

The generic use of the word "triads" for all Chinese criminal organisations is imprecise; triad groups are geographically, ethnically, culturally, and structurally unique. "Triads" are traditional organised-crime groups originating from Hong Kong, Macau, and Taiwan. Criminal organisations operating in, or originating from, mainland China are "mainland Chinese criminal groups" or "black societies".

== History ==
=== Origins ===
The Triad, a China-based criminal organisation, secret association, or club, was a branch of the secret Hung Society, a secret society formed with the intent of overthrowing the then-ruling Qing dynasty. Triads therefore first began as part of an organised patriotic movement to overthrow ethnic Manchu Qing rule, which was considered tyrannical and foreign to the Han ethnic majority. At the turn of the 19th century, Chinese triads were involved in revolutionary and underground activities designed to subvert the ailing Qing, which was considered corrupt and incapable of reform.

Secret societies in the Qing Dynasty era were synonymous with patriotism, with groups operating under the banner of: "Oppose the Qing and Restore the Ming dynasty" (反清复明; Fǎn Qīng Fù Míng). Triads were also enlisted by the Kuomintang (KMT) during the Republican era in order to assassinate political opponents and attack political enemies. Notable organisations included the Green Gang, another Hung Society splinter which participated in the Shanghai massacre of Chinese Communist Party (CCP) members in 1927.

After the proclamation of the People's Republic of China in 1949, secret societies in mainland China were suppressed in campaigns ordered by Mao Zedong. Deng Xiaoping also suppressed the secret societies in his "Strike Hard" campaigns against organised crime in 1978. As a result, most traditional Chinese secret societies, including the triads and some of the remaining Green Gang, relocated to Hong Kong, Taiwan, Southeast Asia, and overseas countries (particularly the United States), where they competed with the Tong and other ethnic Chinese criminal organisations. Gradually, Chinese secret societies turned to the illegal drug trade and extortion for income. In mainland China, there are of two major types of "mainland Chinese criminal organizations": loosely-organised "dark forces" (黑恶势力; Hēi è shìlì) and more mature "black societies" (黑社会; Hēishèhuì). Two features which distinguish a black society from ordinary "dark forces" or low-level criminal gangs are the extent to which the organisation is able to control local markets and the degree of police protection it is able to obtain.

=== 18th century ===
The Tiandihui, the Heaven and Earth Society, also called Hongmen (the Vast Family), is a Chinese fraternal organisation and historically a secretive folk religious sect in the vein of the Ming loyalist White Lotus Sect, the Tiandihui's ancestral organisation. As the Tiandihui spread through different counties and provinces, it branched off into many groups and became known by many names, including the Sanhehui. The Hongmen grouping is today more or less synonymous with the whole Tiandihui concept, although the title "Hongmen" is also claimed by some criminal groups. Branches of the Hongmen were also formed by Chinese communities overseas, some of which became known as Chinese Freemasons. Its current iteration is purely secular.

=== 19th century ===
Such societies were seen as legitimate ways of helping immigrants from China settle into their new place of residence through employment and development of local connections. Triads had been banned by the Colonial government in Hong Kong in 1845, and it is also argued that triads had monopolised the labour market from 1857. Secret societies were banned by the British colonial government in Singapore during the 1890s and were slowly reduced in number by successive colonial governors and leaders. Rackets which facilitated the economic power of Singapore triads, the opium trade, and prostitution were also banned. Immigrants were encouraged to seek help from a local kongsi instead of turning to secret societies, which contributed to the societies' decline. During the Taiping Rebellion, many voluntarily or were forced to aid the Taiping Heavenly Kingdom in opposition to the Qing dynasty. At the end of the 19th century, at least one-third of Hong Kong Chinese were estimated to be part of the triads.

=== 20th century ===
From the 1950s to the 1970s, the Kowloon Walled City in British Hong Kong was controlled by local triads.

Chu Yiu-kong argues that modern triad societies were not originally formed in Hong Kong but instead had their origins in mainland China due to an influx of Chinese refugees. They eventually made use of the triad network to help in opium trafficking as well as non-illicit trade such as labour issues and participation in the republican movement. The triad society worked as a mutual assistance group that assisted in migratory labour.

According to the University of Hong Kong, most triad societies were established between 1914 and 1939 and there were once more than 300 in the territory. Arguably the most prominent triad leader of the 1930s being Du Yuesheng. After World War II, the secret societies saw a resurgence as gangsters took advantage of the uncertainty to re-establish themselves. Some Chinese communities, such as "new villages" in Kuala Lumpur and Bukit Ho Swee in Singapore, became notorious for gang violence. After 1949, in mainland China, law enforcement became stricter and a government crackdown on criminal organisations forced the triads to migrate to British Hong Kong. An estimated 300,000 triad members lived in Hong Kong during the 1950s. The number of groups has consolidated to about 50, of which 14 are under police surveillance. There were four main groups of triads—the Chiu Chow Group (including Sun Yee On), 14K, the Wo Group (including Wo Shing Wo), and the Sze Tai (Luen Group, Tan Yee, Macau Chai, Tung Group), the Big Four in Chinese—operating in Hong Kong. They divided land by ethnic group and geographic locations, with each triad in charge of a region. Each had their own headquarters, sub-societies, and public image.

During the 1960s and 1970s, several notable triad leaders were active such as Ng Sik-ho and Ma Sik-chun in Hong Kong and Stephen Tse in Boston. In the early 1980s, the Chinese Communist Party Deputy Committee Secretary of Xinhua News Agency, Wong Man-fong, negotiated with Hong Kong-based triads on behalf of the government of People's Republic of China to ensure their peace after the handover of Hong Kong. While triad activity increased in mainland China in the 1980s as a result of economic and political changes, increased corruption, rapid urbanisation, and increased demands for illicit goods and services. The 1980s and 1990s saw the downfall of several prominent triad leaders, with arms smuggler Cheung Tze-keung, triad leader Wan Kuok-koi and Peter Chong (convicted of racketeering and extortion) all ending up behind bars, while entertainment industry figures such as Taiwanese director Jimmy Wang Yu and Hong Kong film producer Charles Heung were suspected of having ties to organised crime. In later years, the increase in corruption forced Chinese authorities to launch a series of anti-organised crime campaigns to target criminal syndicates and stop them once and for all. These efforts highlighted concerns about the involvement of minors in organised criminal activity, particularly in drug distribution and smuggling. These crackdowns, for example, in Zhanjiang City dismantled many gangs that controlled or operated in the sand-mining, seafood and basket industries. In addition to underground criminal groups, the triads were heavily involved in various accounts of corruption, with reports including corrupt links with gang leaders, village heads, party secretaries, and even local PSB officers who would oppress residents in local towns.

=== 21st century ===
In the 2000s, reporters noted that the Sun Yee On appeared to send teams from China to São Paulo as enforcers, where they carry out intimidation, assault, and sometimes murder, to anyone who fails to pay protection money. While in Japan, a senior official in 2003 at the National Police Agency in Tokyo mentioned clashes between the yakuza and Chinese gangs were increasing.

On 18 January 2018, Italian police arrested 33 people connected to a Chinese triad operating in Europe as part of its Operation China Truck (which began in 2011). The triad were active in Tuscany, Veneto, Rome and Milan in Italy, and in France, Spain and the German city of Neuss. The indictment accused the Chinese triad of extortion, usury, illegal gambling, prostitution, and drug trafficking. The group was said to have infiltrated the transport sector, using intimidation and violence against Chinese companies wishing to transport goods by road into Europe. Police seized several vehicles, businesses, properties, and bank accounts.

According to the expert in terrorist organisations and mafia-type organised crime, Antonio De Bonis, there is a close relationship between the Triads and the Camorra, and the port of Naples is the most important landing point of the trades managed by the Chinese in cooperation with the Camorra. Among the illegal activities in which the two criminal organisations work together are human trafficking and illegal immigration aimed at the sexual and labour exploitation of Chinese immigrants into Italy, as well as synthetic drug trafficking and the laundering of illicit money through the purchase of real estate. In 2017, investigators discovered an illicit industrial waste transportation scheme jointly run by the Camorra and Triads. The waste was transported from Italy to China, leaving from Prato in Italy and arriving in Hong Kong; a scheme which, prior to its discovery, had been netting millions of US dollars' worth of revenue for both organisations.

In April 2025, Zhang Dayong, known as Asheng, was murdered in Rome with a gunshot to the head and three to the chest. He was the right-hand man of Zhang Naizhong, the alleged head of the Chinese mafia in Europe, and served as his representative in Rome. Zhang Dayong had a history of violent offenses and was considered a key player in the organisation's illegal activities in Italy, including loan sharking and running underground gambling operations. Although he officially ran a store in Rome's Esquilino neighbourhood, Asheng was in charge of the Chinese mafia's operations in the Italian capital. Investigators link him to past violence, including the enforcement of payments through beatings. He was also present at the lavish 2013 wedding of Zhang Naizhong's son, attended by major figures in the Chinese criminal underworld. Asheng reportedly lost favour within the organisation after several missteps, including getting drunk and assaulting women at a brothel managed by a fellow gang member. Intercepted conversations reveal how his disrespect toward superiors and erratic behaviour eventually sealed his fate. His murder is believed to be connected to the ongoing turf war among Chinese gangs, known as the "hanger war" of Prato, which has now spread to Rome. His death marks a significant escalation in the mafia conflict. In August 2025, Italian authorities arrested 13 individuals with connections to Chinese organised crime.

In February 2026, illegal gambling and usury linked to Chinese criminal networks have emerged as central elements in a murder case in Turin, Italy, where Liu Jianwei, known as "Dan", a figure active in clandestine mahjong dens, was killed in March 2025 by Hu Libin, a cook with gambling debts he could no longer repay. Authorities describe the killing, not as a failed robbery but as a settling of accounts within a "rooted and structured" system of usury, in which Liu provided cash loans to Chinese players at extremely high interest rates, reportedly up to 20% per month, while maintaining control over access to illegal gambling venues and pressuring debtors through threats, including against their families. Investigations revealed handwritten records listing debtors and amounts owed, as well as evidence that Liu demanded repayment under strict deadlines and attempted to involve third parties financially. Intercepted communications and investigative findings further outline Liu's role within a broader criminal environment tied to clandestine gambling, usury, and control over debtors within the Chinese community, indicating the presence of an organised and expansive illicit network active in Northwest Italy.

== Criminal activities ==
Triads engage in a variety of crimes such as fraud, extortion, and money laundering, drug trafficking and prostitution, illegal gambling, smuggling, and counterfeit consumer goods such as music, video, software, clothes, watches, and money.

=== Drug trafficking ===
Since the first opium bans during the 19th century, Chinese criminal gangs have been involved in worldwide illegal drug trade. Many triads switched from opium to heroin, produced from opium plants in the Golden Triangle, refined into heroin in China, and trafficked to North America and Europe, in the 1960s and 1970s. The most important triads active in the international heroin trade are the 14K and the Big Circle Gang. Triads smuggle chemicals from Chinese factories to North America (for the production of fentanyl and methamphetamine), and to Europe for the production of MDMA. They are increasingly involved in unlicensed cannabis cultivation in the US. Triads in the United States also traffic large quantities of ketamine. Triad figures are also responsible for large-scale drug trafficking into Australia.

=== Money laundering ===
Triads have become the principal money launderers for drug cartels in Mexico, Italy, and elsewhere. They are reported to be money movers for the elite of the Chinese Communist Party. According to the United States House Select Committee on Strategic Competition between the United States and the Chinese Communist Party, the opioid epidemic in the United States has assisted the triads in becoming "the world's premier money launderers." In the 21st century, Chinese organised crime groups have become major money launderers for cryptocurrency stolen by North Korean hackers.

=== Counterfeiting ===
Triads have been engaging in counterfeiting since the 1880s. During the 1960s and 1970s, they were involved in counterfeiting currency, often the Hong Kong 50-cent piece. The gangs were also involved in counterfeiting expensive books for sale on the black market. With the advent of new technology and the improvement of the average standard of living, triads produce counterfeit goods such as watches, film VCDs and DVDs, and designer apparel such as clothing and handbags. Since the 1970s, triad turf control was weakened and some shifted their revenue streams to legitimate businesses.

=== Pig butchering scams ===
A pig-butchering scam or romance baiting scam is a form of online relationship and investment fraud in which perpetrators cultivate fake romantic or social relationships with victims before persuading them to invest money, often in fraudulent cryptocurrency schemes. Such scams are common on social media and dating apps, and often involve catfishing, investment fraud, and romance scams.

Triads have been active in various cryptocurrency scams.

== Chinese government connections ==
Triads have long been reported to have connections to officials within the Chinese Communist Party, often via its related united front organisations. According to The Washington Post, the Chinese government has engaged in the "selective use or tolerance of criminal groups for geopolitical purposes. Mixing illicit activity and patriotism has become a hallmark of some Chinese organizations with overseas interests." Triad members have acted as agents of the party-state in achieving its political objectives of suppressing dissent, quelling protests and silencing, intimidating, and coercing critics both at home and abroad, particularly in Hong Kong, Taiwan, and countries with high concentrations of ethnic Chinese diaspora. Organised crime groups have provided the Chinese Communist Party with plausible deniability for political warfare efforts and influence within the certain grassroots communities. According to Martin Purbrick, the Chinese Communist Party "recognised the benefit of triads as part of their United Front activities to neutralise opposition." This was demonstrated through the involvement of triads in the 2019 Yuen Long attack against pro-democracy protestors in Hong Kong in 2019. Hong Kong police were subsequently accused of collusion with triad criminal syndicates due to the notable absence of officers at the time of the scene despite heavy police presence at protest events in weeks prior. The activities of triads are enabled by both local government corruption and law enforcement authorities who turn a blind eye to criminal behaviour when influenced by the seniority of corrupt officials out of political convenience. In mainland China, triad groups have worked with local Chinese Communist Party officials. In Taiwan, triad figure Chang An-lo founded the Chinese Unification Promotion Party, a pro-Chinese-government political party.

A 2022 Organized Crime and Corruption Reporting Project (OCCRP) identified connections between key triad figures linked to Wan Kuok-koi and Chinese Communist Party united front political influence operations in Palau. In 2023, a ProPublica investigation found that the leadership of certain Chinese police overseas service stations have ties to organised crime.

In 2024, the OCCRP and The Age reported on connections between triad figures and the Chinese Communist Party's united front operations in the Pacific, particularly in Fiji.

== Structure and composition ==
Traditional triad organisational structure

Triads use numeric codes to distinguish ranks and positions within the gang; the numbers are inspired by Chinese numerology and are based on the I Ching. The Mountain (or Dragon Master Head) is 489, 438 is the Deputy Mountain Master, 432 indicates Straw Sandal rank; the Mountain Master's proxy, Incense Master (who oversees inductions into the triad), and Vanguard are 438 or 2238 (who assists the Incense Master). Law enforcement and intel have it that the Vanguard may actually hold the highest power or final word. A military commander (also known as a Red Pole), overseeing defensive and offensive operations, is 426; 49 denotes a soldier, or rank-and-file member. The White Paper Fan (415) provides financial and business advice, and the Straw Sandal (432) is a liaison between units. An undercover law-enforcement agent or spy from another triad is 25, also popular Hong Kong slang for an informant. Blue Lanterns are uninitiated members, equivalent to Mafia associates, and do not have a designating number. According to De Leon Petta Gomes da Costa, who interviewed triads and authorities in Hong Kong, most of the current structure is a vague, low hierarchy. The traditional ranks and positions no longer exist.

== Rituals and codes of conduct ==
Similar to the Sicilian Mafia, the Japanese yakuza, or the Indian thugs, triad members participate in initiation ceremonies. A typical ceremony takes place at an altar dedicated to Guan Yu, with incense and an animal sacrifice, usually a chicken, pig, or goat. After drinking a mixture of wine and blood (from the animal or the candidate), the member passes beneath an arch of swords while reciting the triad's oaths. The paper on which the oaths are written will be burnt on the altar to confirm the member's obligation to perform his duties to the gods. Three fingers of the left hand are raised as a binding gesture. The triad initiate is required to adhere to 36 oaths.

== Clans ==
=== Based in Hong Kong ===
The most powerful triads based in Hong Kong are:

- Chiu Chow Group:
  - Sun Yee On
  - King Yee
  - Fuk Yee Hing
  - Yee Kwan
- 14K:
  - 14K Yee
  - 14K Hau
  - 14K Yan
  - 14K Yung
  - 14K Ngai
  - 14K Chung
  - 14K Mui
  - 14K Tak
- Wo Group:
  - Wo Hop To
  - Wo Shing Wo
  - Wo On Lok
  - Wo Yung Yee
  - Wo Kwan Ying
  - Wo Li Wo
  - Wo Shing Tong
  - Wo Hung Shing
  - Wo Kwan Lok
  - Wo Yee Tong
  - Wo Shing Yee
  - Wo Yat Ping
  - Wo Yee Ping
- Sze Tai:
  - Luen Group:
    - Luen Ying Sh'e
    - Luen Kwan Ying
    - Luen Yee Sh'e
    - Luen Kwan Sh'e
  - Tan Yee
  - Macau Chai
  - Tung Group:
    - Tung San Wo
    - Tung Lok Tong
    - Tung Yee
- Big Circle Gang
- Hunan Gang
- Rung Group
- Shing Group
- Chuen Group:
  - Chuen Chi Wo
  - Chuen Yat Chi
- Carpet Bomber
  - Neon Dragon

=== Based elsewhere ===
Many triads emigrated to Taiwan and Chinese communities worldwide:

- Bamboo Union, Taiwan
- Four Seas Gang, Taiwan
- Tien Tao Meng, Taiwan
- Song Lian Gang, Taiwan
- Lo Fu-chu, Taiwan
- Sio Sam Ong, Malaysia
- Ang Soon Tong, Singapore
- Wah Kee, Singapore
- Ghee Hin Kongsi, Singapore
- Ping On, Boston
- Wah Ching, San Francisco
- Black Dragons, Los Angeles
- Flying Dragons, New York City
- Ghost Shadows, New York City
- Green Dragons, New York City
- White Tigers, New York City
- Ah Kong, Amsterdam, Bangkok
- The Company, Australia, Macau

=== Tongs ===
Similar to triads, Tongs originated independently in early immigrant Chinatown communities. The word means "social club", and tongs are not specifically underground organisations. The first tongs formed during the second half of the 19th century among marginalised members of early immigrant Chinese-American communities for mutual support and protection from nativists. Modelled on triads, they were established without clear political motives and became involved in criminal activities such as extortion, illegal gambling, drug and human trafficking, murder, and prostitution.

=== Southeast Asia ===
Triads are also active in Chinese communities throughout Southeast Asia. When Malaysia and Singapore (with the region's largest population of ethnic Chinese) became crown colonies, secret societies and triads controlled local communities by extorting protection money and illegal money lending. Many conducted blood rituals, such as drinking one another's blood, as a sign of brotherhood; others ran opium dens and brothels.

Remnants of these former gangs and societies still exist. Due to government efforts in Malaysia and Singapore to reduce crime, the societies have largely faded from the public eye (particularly in Malaysia).

Triads were also common in Vietnamese cities with large Chinese (especially Cantonese and Teochew) communities. During the French colonial period, many businesses and wealthy residents in Saigon (particularly in the Chinatown district) and Haiphong were controlled by protection-racket gangs.

With Vietnamese independence in 1945, organised crime activity was drastically reduced as Ho Chi Minh's government purged criminal activity in the country. According to Ho, abolishing crime was a method of protecting Vietnam and its people. During the First Indochina War, Ho's police forces concentrated on protecting people in his zone from crime; the French cooperated with criminal organisations to fight the Viet Minh. In 1955, President Ngô Đình Diệm ordered the South Vietnamese military to disarm and imprison organised-crime groups in the Saigon-Gia Định-Biên Hòa-Vũng Tàu region and cities such as Mỹ Tho and Cần Thơ in the Mekong Delta. Diem banned brothels, massage parlours, casinos and gambling houses, opium dens, bars, drug houses, and nightclubs, all establishments frequented by the triads. However, Diệm allowed criminal activity to finance his attempts to eliminate the Viet Minh in the south. Law enforcement was stricter in the north, with stringent control and monitoring of criminal activities. The government of the Democratic Republic of Vietnam purged and imprisoned organised criminals, including triads, in the Haiphong and Hanoi areas. With pressure from Ho Chi Minh's police, Triad affiliates had to choose between elimination or legality. During the Vietnam War, the triads were eliminated in the north; in the south, Republic of Vietnam corruption protected their illegal activities and allowed them to control US aid. During the 1970s and 1980s, all illegal Sino-Vietnamese activities were eliminated by the Vietnamese police. Most triads were compelled to flee to Taiwan, Hong Kong, or other countries in Southeast Asia.

=== International activities ===
Triads are also active in other regions with significant overseas-Chinese populations: Hong Kong, Macau, Taiwan, South Korea, Japan, the United States, Canada, Australia, New Zealand, the United Kingdom, France, Italy, the Netherlands, Belgium, Germany, Spain, Brazil, Peru, Argentina, Romania, Bulgaria, Russia, and South Africa. They are often involved in migrant smuggling. Shanty and Mishra (2007) estimate that the annual profit from narcotics is $200 billion, and annual revenues from human trafficking into Europe and the United States are believed to amount to $3.5 billion.

In Australia, the major importer of illicit drugs in recent decades has been 'The Company', according to police sources in the region. This is a conglomerate run by triad bosses which focuses particularly on methamphetamine and cocaine. It has laundered money through junkets for high-stakes gamblers who visit Crown Casinos in Australia and Macau.

In South Africa, Law Enforcement Authorities have claimed that several large independent subgroups of the Triad conduct large scale human trafficking, drug trafficking, money laundering, as well as operate prostitution and gambling rings. South African authorities have identified four major Chinese gangs connected to the Triad operating in South Africa: the Wo Shing Wo group, the San Yee On group, the 14K-Hau group, and the 14K-Ngai group. On November 22, 2022, a shoot-out between rival Triad factions took place on a crowded street in Cape Town, leaving several bystanders injured.

== Countermeasures ==
=== Law enforcement ===
==== Mainland China ====
Bo Xilai, CCP committee secretary of Chongqing, imitated the Smash Black campaign against organized crime in 2009. The government's 2018 Sweep Black campaign also targeted organized crime.

==== Hong Kong ====
Hong Kong police actions regularly target organised crime, including raids on triad-controlled entertainment establishments and undercover work. The journal Foreign Policy reported in its August 2019 edition about alleged triad involvement in repressing the Hong Kong protests.

===== Legislation =====
Primary laws addressing triads are the Societies Ordinance and the Organized and Serious Crimes Ordinance. The former, enacted in 1949 to outlaw triads in Hong Kong, stipulates that any person convicted of being (or claiming to be) an officeholder or managing (or assisting in the management) of a triad can be fined up to HK$1 million and imprisoned for up to 15 years.

The power of triads has also diminished due to the 1974 establishment of the Independent Commission Against Corruption. The commission targeted corruption in police departments linked with triads. Being a member of a triad is an offence punishable by fines ranging from HK$100,000 to HK$250,000 and three to seven years imprisonment under an ordinance enacted in Hong Kong in 1994, which aims to provide police with special investigative powers, provide heavier penalties for organised-crime activities, and authorise the courts to confiscate the proceeds of such crimes.

==== Canada ====
At the national (and, in some cases, provincial) level, the Royal Canadian Mounted Police's Organized Crime Branch is responsible for investigating gang-related activities (including triads). The Canada Border Services Agency Organized Crime Unit works with the RCMP to detain and remove non-Canadian triad members. Asian gangs are found in many cities, primarily Toronto, Vancouver, Calgary, and Edmonton.

The Guns and Gangs Unit of the Toronto Police Service is responsible for handling triads in the city. The Asian Gang Unit of the Metro Toronto Police was formerly responsible for dealing with triad-related matters, but a larger unit was created to deal with the broad array of ethnic gangs.

The Organized Crime and Law Enforcement Act provides a tool for police forces in Canada to handle organised criminal activity. The act enhances the general role of the Criminal Code (with amendments to deal with organised crime) in dealing with criminal triad activities. Asian organised-crime groups were ranked the fourth-greatest organised-crime problem in Canada, behind outlaw motorcycle clubs, aboriginal crime groups, and Indo-Canadian crime groups.

In 2011, it was estimated that criminal gangs associated with triads controlled 90 percent of the heroin trade in Vancouver. Due to its geographic and demographic characteristics, Vancouver is the point of entry into North America for much of the heroin produced in Southeast Asia (much of the trade controlled by international organised-crime groups associated with triads). From 2006 to 2014, Southeast, East and South Asians accounted for 21 percent of gang deaths in British Columbia (trailing only Caucasians, who made up 46.3 percent of gang deaths).

==== Australia ====
In June 2022, commissioner of the Australian Federal Police, Reece Kershaw, stated at the Five Eyes Law Enforcement Group that foreign governments were collaborating with criminal syndicates in the West and that: "state actors and citizens from some nations are using our countries at the expense of our sovereignty and economies".

In August 2022, reporting by the Australian Broadcasting Corporation revealed that Hong Kong-based jewelry and real estate development conglomerate Chow Tai Fook was endorsed by the Queensland state government as a 25% shareholder in The Star casino's Queen's wharf development.

The Chow Fook Tai conglomerate is owned by Cheng Yu-tung, who was believed to have affiliations with the 14K triad and was alleged to have connections with Hong Kong and Macau organised crime syndicates, specifically through business connections with Wan Kuok Kui, "Broken Tooth", or "Broken Tooth Koi" in triad circles.

The 14K, Sun Yee On triads were believed to have been closely affiliated with Cheng and used as enforcers for the collection of gambling debts, in addition to being engaged in prostitution, human, and drug trafficking. Kui has been the subject of sanctions by the United States Department of Treasury under the Magnitsky Act for corruption, embezzlement, and "misappropriation of state assets" as of 2020.

== Notable members ==
- Chaiyanat "Tuhao" Kornchayanant (a powerful Thai-Chinese businessman and crime boss who is accused of leading a Chinese mafia group in Bangkok).
- Qi Guang Guo (a notorious Chinese Australian crime boss, known for being a high-ranking leader of the Big Circle Gang in Australia)
- Xie Caiping, one of the most notorious female criminals to be a high-ranking member within the triads; she is the most powerful criminal in Chongqing and is known by her nickname, "Godmother of the underworld". She was one of the convicted criminals in the Chongqing gang trials
- "Fei Kai", former leader of Wo On Lok
- Zhang Naizhong, considered the boss of the Chinese underworld in Italy, and one of the most powerful Chinese crime bosses in Europe.
- Kwok "Shanghai Boy" Wing-hung, Wo Shing Wo's most notorious dragonhead
- Cheung "Inch Brother" Chung-wing, former leader of Wo Shing Wo
- Wan Kuok-koi, former leader of the Macau branch of 14K
- Raymond "Shrimp Boy" Chow, former leader of the American branch of Wo Hop To
- Peter Chong, former leader of the American branch of Wo Hop To
- Chen Chi-li, former leader of Bamboo Union, Taiwan's largest Triad
- Michael Chan, Hong Kong actor and martial artist, second-in-command of the Tsim Sha Tsui branch of 14K
- Stephen Tse, founder and leader of the Chinese-American triad Ping On
- Tse Chi Lop, Chinese Canadian kingpin, leader of Sam Gor, a powerful Asia-Pacific triad syndicate and former member of the Big Circle Gang
- John Willis, high-ranking member of Ping On, and the only white person to be a high-ranking member of a triad
- Mary "Rosebud" Ong, Filipina former 14K Triad "Big Sister" and money launderer who later worked with corrupt Manila based police officers to traffick methamphetamine and set up rival Triads for sting operations / kidnap for ransom
- Tony Lee (a Chinese Irish businessman and restaurateur who was the dragonhead of the Irish branch of 14K until his murder in July 1979).
- Lee Tai-lung (dragon head of Tsim Sha Tsui branch of Sun Yee On until his assassination on August 4, 2009).
- Lai Tong-sang (dragon head of the Macau branch of Wo On Lok).
- Leung Kwok-chung, aka "Tattooed Chung" (high-ranking leader of the Tai Kok Tsui branch of Wo Shing Wo and the mastermind behind the murder of Lee Tai-lung, the dragon head of Tsim Sha Tsui branch of Sun Yee On).

== See also ==
- Baltagiya
- Colectivo (Venezuela)
- List of criminal enterprises, gangs and syndicates
- Organized crime in Taiwan
- Organized crime in Hong Kong
- Secret societies in Singapore
- Snakeheads – Chinese human-trafficking groups
- Social problems in Chinatown
- Titushky
- Triads in the United Kingdom
- Xiantiandao

== General and cited references ==
Books (Triad societies)

- Bolton, Kingsley; Hutton, Christopher (2000). Triad societies: western accounts of the history, sociology and linguistics of Chinese secret societies. Taylor & Francis.
- Booth, Martin (1999). The Dragon Syndicates: The Global Phenomenon of the Triads. New York: Doubleday. ISBN 9780385409148. OCLC 1097228966.
- Chu, Y. K. (2002). The Triads as Business. London; New York: Routledge. ISBN 9780415170925. OCLC 41565059.
- Mallory, Stephen L. (2007). Understanding Organized Crime. Jones & Bartlett Learning.
- Reynolds, John Lawrence (2006). Secret societies: inside the world's most notorious organizations. Arcade Publishing.
- Ter Haar, B. J. (1998). Ritual and Mythology of the Chinese Triads: Creating an Identity. Sinica Leidensia 43. ISBN 9789004110632.

Books (Black societies or criminal organisations in mainland China)

- Wang, Peng (2017-01-19). The Chinese Mafia: Organized Crime, Corruption, and Extra-Legal Protection. Oxford University Press. doi:10.1093/acprof:oso/9780198758402.001.0001. ISBN 978-0-19-875840-2.

News

- Gertz, Bill; "Organized-crime triads targeted", The Washington Times (Friday, April 30, 2010). Retrieved 10 June 2013.
- Wong, Natalie; "Dragons smell blood again", The Standard (January 21, 2011). Retrieved 10 June 2013.

Government publication

- "Hong Kong – The Facts: Police" (PDF). Information Services Department, Hong Kong Special Administrative Region Government. August 2010.

Video'

- "Gangland- Deadly Triangle". Online video clip. YouTube, 2008. Web. Accessed 21 April 2016.

=== Articles ===
- Ownby, David (1995). "The Heaven and Earth Society as Popular Religion". The Journal of Asian Studies. 54 (4): 1023–1046. doi:10.2307/2059958. JSTOR 2059958. S2CID 162946271.
