= 14K (triad) =

Hong Kong-based triad

- 十四K
- Founded: 1945
- Founder: Kot Siu-wong
- Founding location: Guangzhou, China
- Years active: 1945–present
- Territory: Hong Kong, Macau, China, and Chinese communities globally
- Membership: 20,000
- Criminal activities: Drug trafficking, counterfeiting, illegal gambling, bookmaking, arms trafficking, arson, fraud, human trafficking, identity theft, money laundering, extortion, murder, illegal immigration, kidnapping, hacking, racketeering, home invasion robberies
- Allies: Ping On; Snakeheads; Wah Ching; Tiny Rascal Gang
- Rivals: Ah Kong; Big Circle Gang; Sun Yee On; Wo On Lok; Wo Shing Wo

14K
- Chinese: 十四K
Transcriptions
Standard Mandarin
- Hanyu Pinyin: Shísìkēi
Yue: Cantonese
- Yale Romanization: Sahp-sei Kēi
- Jyutping: sap^{6} sei^{3} kei^{1}

The 14K (Chinese: 十四K; Cantonese Yale: Sahp-sei Kēi, [sap̚sɛjkɛj]) is a triad group based in Hong Kong but active internationally. It is the second largest triad group in the world with around 20,000 members split into thirty subgroups. They are the main rival of the Sun Yee On, which is the largest triad.

== Criminal focus ==
The 14K is responsible for large-scale drug trafficking around the world, most of it heroin and opium from China or Southeast Asia. This is their primary business in terms of generating income. They are also involved in illegal gambling, loan sharking, money laundering, contract murder, arms trafficking, prostitution, human trafficking, extortion, counterfeiting and, to a lesser extent, home invasion robberies.

== Origin of name ==
Several theories exist as to how the Triad got the moniker "14K", with no definitive reason on record, however several explanations have been proposed such as:

- The original 14 founder members were part of the Kuomintang
- The "14" refers to the organization's original birthplace at Number 14 Baohua Road in Xiguan, while "K" is the first letter of the Kuomintang
- "K" refers to Kwang Chow (also known as Guangzhou), which was the birthplace of Hongfashan Zhongyitang
- "K" refers to Kowloon-Kiu Kiang Street in Sham Shui Po, which was the birthplace of the 14K Triad in British Hong Kong
- The "14" represents the road number of its former headquarters and "K" stands for Kowloon
- "K" refers to founding member Kuomintang Lieutenant-General Kot Siu-wong's surname "Kot"
- "14K" represents 14K gold, which as a synthetic alloy is harder than pure gold and thus along with excellence symbolizes the strength of the organization

== History ==
The 14K was formed in 1945, by Kuomintang Lieutenant-General Kot Siu-wong in Guangzhou, China, as an anti-Communist action group. In 1949, the group relocated to British Hong Kong after the Kuomintang evacuated China following the Communist victory in the Chinese Civil War. After the Chinese Civil War ended in the victory of the Communists in 1949, a defeated Kuomintang army fled in early 1950 from Yunnan province into Burma, a state which then as now has a weak government that does not exercise control over all of its territory. In the part of Burma controlled by the Kuomintang adjoining Yunnan, it became a centre of growing opium. The 14K became the main distributors of the opium grown by their allies in Burma, shipping the opium to Europe and North America, becoming the pioneers in establishing the smuggling networks in the "Golden Triangle" in Southeast Asia.

Compared with other triad societies, the 14K is one of the largest and most violent Hong Kong-based triad societies, and its members appear to be more loosely connected. 14K factional violence is out of control, because no dragonhead is able to govern all factions of 14K worldwide.

While Hong Kong's 14K triad gang dominates its traditional areas of operation and has expanded far beyond the region, its focus remains China-centric. Hong Kong triads, including the 14K, have expanded their activities in mainland China. A key motivation for members to cross into China is to avoid police security and anti-gang crackdowns in Hong Kong.

During the 1956 riots, the 14K confronted the colonial government at the time. The riot caused 60 deaths and over 400 hospitalisations. After the riot, the colonial government arrested over 10,000 14K members, with 600 of them being deported to Taiwan. The government then created the Triad Societies Bureau, in order to assist law enforcement in combating triad activities.

In 1997, there were a number of gang-related attacks that left 69 people dead. Under Wan Kuok-koi (nicknamed "Broken Tooth Koi", 崩牙駒), the 14K was being challenged by the smaller Shui Fong Triad. In 1998, a gunman believed to be connected to the local 14K killed a Portuguese national and wounded another at a pavement café in Macau. In 1999, a Portuguese court convicted 45-year-old mob boss, Broken Tooth Koi, on various criminal charges and sentenced him to 15 years' imprisonment. His 14K gang was suspected of drive-by shootings, car bombings and attempted assassinations. Seven of his associates received lesser sentences. Since the crackdown in Macau, the 14K triad resurfaced in cities such as Los Angeles, San Francisco and Chicago in the United States; Vancouver, Calgary and Toronto in Canada; Sydney in Australia; and the UK.

== Structure and membership ==
The organizational structure of Chinese organised crime in the United States is quite complex. Broadly defined, there is a great variety of Chinese criminal organisations. These include gangs, secret societies, triads, tongs, Taiwanese organized crime groups, and strictly US-based tongs and gangs.

According to Ko-lin Chin, the foremost academic expert in the U.S. on Chinese organized crime, there is no empirical support for the belief that there is a well-organised, monolithic, hierarchical criminal cartel called the "Chinese Mafia." Chin says: "My findings do not support the notion that a chain of command exists among these various crime groups or that they coordinate with one another routinely in international crimes such as heroin trafficking, money laundering, and the smuggling of aliens" (1996:123).

One of the structural characteristics that makes Chinese organized crime different from other forms is the relationship between some of the street gangs and certain adult organisations. The latter are called tongs. Tong-affiliated gangs, like the Wah Ching, have an ah kung (grandfather) or shuk foo (uncle) who is their tong leader. The top gang position is the dai-dai lo (big big brother). Communication between the tong and the gang occurs principally between these two individuals. Below the dai dai lo in descending order are the dai lo(s) or big brothers, the yee lo/saam lo (clique leaders), and at the bottom the ma jai or little horses (sai-lo). There are a variety of norms and rules that govern the gangs. These include respecting the ah kung, beating up members of other gangs on your turf, not using drugs, following the orders of the dai lo, and not betraying the gang. Rules violators are punished, sometimes severely, such as through physical assault and killing.

=== Recruiting ===
The typical target for recruitment is the youth. In California there have been cases of 14K members recruiting teens in Asian densely populated areas such as San Francisco or Orange County. In Hong Kong, 14K members would usually recruit teens in poorer areas such as Kowloon, Kwun Tong, or Tuen Mun while also targeting certain schools.

=== Role of women ===
Women have a relatively small role in the 14K triad, as it is a male dominant society. A exception to the rule would be Mary "Rosebud" Ong, who in the 1980s laundered proceeds of crime worth billions of US dollars for various Triad syndicates in British Hong Kong, as well as acting as a negotiator between 14K Triads and corrupt Philippine National Police officers in the mid-1990s.

== International activity ==
=== Africa ===
==== South Africa ====
Two 14K groups, 14K-Hau and 14K-Ngai, are among seven Chinese criminal organizations operating in South Africa, represented in both Cape Town and Johannesburg, specialising primarily in extortion and abalone trafficking. In 2000, the estimated gross income from the illegal exportation of abalone to Hong Kong was US$32 million.

=== Asia ===
==== Japan ====
The National Police Agency stated in 1997 that the 14K had been expanding its operations in Japan since the 1980s and had branches in Fukuoka, Osaka, Sapporo and Tokyo, each with at least 1,000 members. The 14K in Japan has been involved in counterfeiting credit cards and has cooperated with yakuza groups in the importation of large numbers of illegal Chinese migrants.

==== Myanmar ====
14K has been connected to scam centres in Myanmar, financing the construction of the city of Shwe Kokko.

==== Philippines ====
The 14K Triad began trafficking multi tonne shipments of methamphetamine to drug distributors in the Metro Manila region in the 1990s. The 14K Triad has been involved in smuggling arms to Abu Sayyaf and has reportedly cooperated with the Islamic group in laundering and transmitting ransom money, taking a percentage of the ransoms in exchange for their assistance.

==== Thailand ====
The 14K is the largest Chinese crime syndicate operating in Thailand. In January 2000, a haul of 100 kilograms (220 pounds) of heroin bound for the United States confiscated during an operation in Bangkok was attributed to the 14K. In addition to heroin, the 14K is involved in the smuggling and sale of the amphetamine ya ba. Using Bangkok as a commercial and trafficking base, they transport and distribute the Burmese-manufactured drug to the Thai narcotics industry. The influx of other Chinese gangs and syndicates into Thailand has led to a series of turf wars between the 14K and smaller rival groups, fighting over territory in Thailand and sections of neighbouring Cambodia.

=== Europe ===
==== Belgium and the Netherlands ====
The 14K triad has been active in the Netherlands since as early as the 1970s, when members of the gang controlled Chinese restaurants in numerous cities in the country. Dutch police authorities believe that the 14K took full control of heroin importation into the Benelux countries in 1987. The 14K established a direct connection with Hong Kong, via Bangkok, the chief transit point. In the Netherlands, the 14K is divided into seven-to-ten-person cells, mainly in Amsterdam, that function as relay posts for moving heroin elsewhere in Europe. Authorities believe that Belgium now plays an equally important role. Heroin laboratories that were discovered in the Netherlands have been reassembled in Flanders, with strong bases in Brussels and Antwerp.

A foothold in Belgium has brought the narcotics traffickers closer to the money-laundering banks of Luxembourg. In 1998, the chief of Belgium's security agency stated of Chinese criminal organizations in the country: "They include several hundred Asiatics and have a strong familial characteristic. Their activities are very diverse, also including [besides narcotics] gambling and illegal workshops. They also are developing money laundering, both small-scale (restaurants, etc.) and large-scale, such as real estate and even industrial projects." For example, the 14K controls illegal gambling casinos in Antwerp. Belgium and the Netherlands form two corners of a triangular narcotics route of the 14K triad. The third corner is Paris.

==== France ====
The 14K is among the leading triads in France, where it has cooperated with Turkish, Albanian and Nigerian crime groups in heroin trafficking.

==== Ireland ====
The first reported triad activity in Ireland came in July 1979 when the 14K attempted a takeover of a Dublin-based Chinese gang's protection rackets which led to a deadly gang fight resulting in two deaths. Tony Lee, allegedly a high-ranking member of the 14K's Cork branch, was killed along with Michael Tsin of the rival Dublin faction. In August 1983, twelve members of the 14K were arrested in Limerick in connection with attempting to extort money from the owners of Chinese restaurants in the city. Nine of the men were believed to have come over from the UK. During the operation, a hoard of weapons including knives, pickaxes, bars and clubs were found.

The 14K and other triads gained a firm foothold in Ireland in the 1980s when large numbers of Chinese restaurants opened in Cork and Dublin. The triad association is still very much active but now operate in smaller groups run by members and distant relatives of the Nam and Tsin family. Underbosses, bosses and high ranking soldiers are believed to have "14K" tattooed on them using ink mixed with blood that's been blessed by Kuang Kong. This dilutes the ink and gives a faded effect which symbolises life in purgatory.

Leaked diplomatic cables obtained by the Irish Independent in 2011 included intelligence reports by the Garda Síochána (Irish police) on Chinese organized crime in the country, specifically the activities of the 14K and their rival Wo Shing Wo. The reported criminal activities of the triads included the trafficking of women and children from China into Ireland, involvement in casinos, and money laundering. Gardaí also reported a great deal of interaction between the Chinese gangs operating in Ireland and Scotland.

The 14K has a branch in Spain, operating from Madrid.

==== United Kingdom ====
The 14K was the first triad society to arrive in the United Kingdom, emerging from the Chinese communities of London, Birmingham, Liverpool and Manchester during the post-war period. Although nearly all triad groups operating in the UK at the time were affiliated with the 14K, each operated independently of the Hong Kong 14K and generally viewed each other as rivals. Other triad societies did not arrive in the UK until 1964, when the Labour Party encouraged large-scale immigration, bringing a huge influx of Hong Kong diaspora.

While active predominantly in Birmingham and the north of England, the 14K has a strong presence in London, where they have been involved in turf wars with their rival Wo Shing Wo as well as Fujianese snakehead gangs. On 3 June 2003, alleged 14K member You Yi He, who was the subject of a police investigation into people-smuggling at the time of his death, was shot and killed in London's Chinatown. The 14K has battled Wo Shing Wo for control of rackets in Glasgow. The two groups have cooperated in cigarette smuggling in Scotland. In July 2003, 14K members were ambushed in a machete attack on Glasgow's Sauchiehall Street by Wo Shing Wo, in a dispute over the control of protection rackets.

=== North America ===
==== Canada ====
The 14K has been among the most active triad societies in Canada, maintaining a chapter in Toronto. The 14K established its chapter in Toronto in 1976. The 14K was reported in the 1970s to be recruiting actively within the Chinese-Canadian community as well bringing new members from Hong Kong.

Initially, the group was made up of members from Hong Kong but later recruited from the Vietnamese community, and absorbed the remnants of the defunct Ghost Shadows. In 1988, the Criminal Intelligence Service Canada (CISC) estimated the number of members in the 14K's Toronto branch at 150, with around 40 criminally active in heroin trafficking, migrant smuggling, theft and extortion. The Sam Gor syndicate is composed of 14K and other Triads and has Canadian roots in and leadership from the Big Circle Boys.

==== Mexico ====
Intelligence reports from the Attorney General of Mexico and the Philippine Drug Enforcement Agency have indicated that the 14K triad is among the suppliers of raw materials used in the manufacturing of methamphetamine to the Sinaloa Cartel.

==== United States ====
The 14K has a presence in New York, California, Chicago, Boston and Houston. The 14K has had connections to the leadership of the Ping On triad in Boston and Wah Ching in San Francisco.

High-ranking 14K member Hui Sin Ma aka Frank Ma, who was born in China and illegally immigrated to the U.S. in the 1980s, began his criminal career in Boston and San Francisco before settling in Queens, New York, where he became associated with the On Leong Tong and their youth gang the Ghost Shadows, as well as the Hip Sing Tong, along with their youth gang the Flying Dragons. In Queens, he oversaw heroin dealing, illegal gambling, a luxury car-theft ring, extortion rackets and immigrant smuggling.

Ma ordered numerous killings to protect his criminal enterprise. In 1996, he fled to China to avoid detection by police. He later returned to the U.S. and was arrested in 2003. In 2010, with the cooperation of one of his underlings, John Chan, Ma was convicted of murder and narcotics charges and sentenced to life in prison. Frank Ma was described by law enforcement as "one of the last of the Asian godfathers."

=== Oceania ===
==== Australia ====
The 14K is among the main groups responsible for heroin trafficking in Australia. Based in Chinatown, Sydney, 14K members did racketeering, loan sharking, and protection money to all Chinese restaurants; they made their most income from heroin sales in Sydney city and surrounding areas. Their rivals were Wo Shing Wo, Lo San, Big Circle and Sun Yee On.The Australian Federal Police made an Asian task force to crack them all down called the OAK Task Force; it completely wiped them out by the year 2000. Riv

==== New Zealand ====
New Zealand police have stated that the 14K is the most powerful Asian crime syndicate operating in the country. They are involved in the importation of pseudoephedrine, a chemical precursor in the illicit manufacture of methamphetamine, from Hong Kong and mainland China, which they sell to local drug trafficking gangs, the Head Hunters and the Hells Angels.

In August 2008, the 14K was allegedly involved in a high-profile kidnapping of a Chinese family near Papatoetoe, Auckland. The plan was to demand a ransom, but they were found before the money was paid.

== See also ==
- Tiandihui
- Green Gang
- Bamboo Union
  - Tung Kuei-sen
  - Chen Chi-li

== Bibliography ==
- Schneider, Stephen (2009). Iced: The Story of Organized Crime in Canada (2nd ed.). Toronto: John Wiley & Sons. ISBN 978-0470835005.
