= Shui Fong =

Triad group

- Founded: 1930s
- Founding location: To Kwa Wan, Hong Kong
- Years active: 1930s–present
- Territory: Hong Kong, Macau, mainland China, and Chinese communities globally
- Ethnicity: Chinese
- Activities: Counterfeiting, drug trafficking, extortion, human trafficking, loan sharking, money laundering, murder, prostitution
- Rivals: 14K; Wo Shing Wo

Shui Fong
- Traditional Chinese: 水房幫
- Simplified Chinese: 水房帮
Transcriptions
Standard Mandarin
- Hanyu Pinyin: Shuǐfángbāng
Yue: Cantonese
- Yale Romanization: Séui-fòhng Bōng
- Jyutping: seoi^{2} fong^{4} bong^{1}

Shui Fong (Chinese: 水房幫; lit. 'Water Room Gang'), also known as the Wo On Lok (WOL, Chinese: 和安樂), is one of the main Triad groups in Southern China, operating especially in Hong Kong, Macau and Chinese communities abroad.

Today it is one of Hong Kong's most active triad groups, along with Sun Yee On, 14K and the "Wo" family of triads, especially the Wo Shing Wo. It runs extortion operations, loan sharking, narcotics and the control of nightclubs, mahjong dens and massage parlours. According to police, its turf extends across Yau Ma Tei, Tsim Sha Tsui, Mong Kok and Sham Shui Po.

In Macau, Shui Fong is one of the "Four Major Gangs" (四大黑幫), the others being Wo Shing Yee, 14K and the Big Circle Gang.

== History ==
Wo On Lok is the Gang's original name. The nickname "Shui Fong" (Water House) only emerged later. A popular claim holds that the nickname came from the Connaught Aerated Water Company ("On Lok Aerated Water House"; Chinese: 安樂汽水房), and that the Gang was founded by its workers.

However, this claim is unsupported by historical evidence. Company records show that the Connaught Aerated Water Company Limited operated in Wan Chai from 1907 until its closure in 1962, with no evidence that it was ever based in Kowloon. By contrast, police records place Shui Fong's early activities in Sham Shui Po, To Kwa Wan and Yau Ma Tei in 1930's, while the oral history The Truth About Hong Kong Triad Activities (1979) states that its early members came mainly from tea-house workers and cooked-food hawkers in Kowloon.

Some researchers therefore argue that "Shui Fong" was simply a later underworld nickname, derived from the shared "On Lok" (安樂) name, rather than evidence that the society originated from a soft-drinks factory.

It was allegedly involved in a fight for casinos in Macau during the 1990s. They were involved in a high-profile gang war with perennial rivals the 14K, led in Macau by 'Broken Tooth Koi' during this period.

In Hong Kong in 2009, the group elected as leaders 'Fei Wai' and 'Sam Chuen'. However, when the pair refused to stand down in 2011, a series of violent and very public confrontations ensued between their supporters and those of two rivals – known as 'Chi Fung' and 'Dai Ma', lasting into 2013.

On 15 January 2010 a 15-year-old boy was killed during a clash between 14K Triad and Shui Fong members at Lower Wong Tai Sin Estate. Fifteen people were arrested in connection with the boy's murder, aged 15 to 22. The victim died after being punched, kicked, and hit by glass bottles.

== International activity ==
=== Benelux ===
Shui Fong is one of seven triad groups documented as being active in the Benelux countries.

=== Canada ===
Lai Tong Sang, the alleged "dragon head" (boss) of the Shui Fong in Macau who arrived in Canada on 28 October 1996 on a permanent resident visa, was ordered deported from the country in August 2013 after he was deemed not admissible due to his ties to organized crime. Lai was the target of a drive-by shooting at his Vancouver home in July 1997. A 14K member in Hong Kong had asked the 14K in Canada to kill Lai in relation to the conflict between the rival groups in Macau at the time. Documents filed with the Federal Court of Canada show that Lai laundered millions of dollars in Canada as immigration officials waited over a decade for access to police wiretap information that allowed them to move to have him deported.

=== Ireland ===
The Shui Fong operates in Dublin and Belfast. Reports of Shui Fong activity in Ireland date back as far as at least 1983.

=== United Kingdom ===
The Shui Fong is active in London, Southampton, Glasgow and Belfast. The group established itself in the United Kingdom shortly after the Sino-British Joint Declaration (1984), when news of Hong Kong's return to China caused many gang members to flee to the UK. In comparison to other triad groups in the UK, the Shui Fong engages in lesser crimes such as video piracy, counterfeiting and illegal gambling, although also carries out extortion on the Chinese community.

Restaurant owner and alleged Shui Fong "white paper fan" (business adviser) Philip Wong was murdered by a gang of contract killers armed with machetes in Glasgow on 9 October 1985. It is believed Wong was murdered after refusing to do business with the Wo Shing Wo who wanted a share of his lucrative Chinese video rental business. Three men wanted for the murder have never been traced.

In the first British court case in which a member of a Chinese criminal society gave evidence, five alleged Shui Fong members – Jason Shui Cheung Wan, Tak Kam Chow, David Chong Chi Chan, Danny Wai Yuen Liu, and Wai Wan Ho – were acquitted at the Old Bailey in London in December 1992 of plotting the shooting of Hong Kong businessman Ying Kit Lam. A sixth man, Clifford Wai Ming Tang, was discharged after the jury could not agree on a verdict. George Wai Hen Cheung, who pleaded guilty to shooting Lam, had named the six men as accomplices. Georcge Cheung himself had been initiated into the Triad in the basement of the Princess Garden Restaurant on Greyhound Road, Fulham earlier that year. Lam, who was allegedly attempting to take control of the Shui Fong in the UK, was left crippled after being shot four times in Chinatown, London on 7 September 1991.

== See also ==
- Organised crime
