= Murder of Aw Teck Boon =

1999 unsolved murder of a ganglord in Singapore

Aw Teck Boon
- Aw Teck Boon, who was murdered in his sleep in 1999
- Born: Aw Teck Boon c. 1956; Colony of Singapore
- Died: 5 May 1999 (aged 43); Geylang, Singapore
- Cause of death: Death by stabbing
- Other name: Singapore Siao
- Occupations: Sailor (former); Triad leader (former)
- Known for: Gang leader of Sio Kun Tong; Murder victim
- Criminal charges: Armed robbery Loan shark activities Being part of a gang
- Criminal penalty: Ten years of detention without trial under the Criminal Law (Temporary Provisions) Act (CLTPA)
- Criminal status: Released in the 1990s Murdered in 1999
- Spouse: Unnamed Thai woman
- Children: Wendy Aw (daughter)
- Parent(s): Aw Swee Seng (father); Unnamed mother

On 5 May 1999, 43-year-old seaman Aw Teck Boon (Chinese: 区德文; pinyin: Ōu Déwén; Pe̍h-ōe-jī: Au Tek-bûn), (Note: His Chinese name was also spelt as 胡德文 Hú Déwén) alias Singapore Siao (Chinese: 新加坡笑; Pe̍h-ōe-jī: Sin-ka-po siàu), (Note: It was translated as "Madman of Singapore". Siao (痟; siáu) means "crazy" in Hokkien) was found murdered at Geylang after drinking at a nearby coffee shop. Aw was infamously known to be a triad leader of Sio Kun Tong and had spent time in prison for his gangland activities. It was speculated that Aw was attacked and stabbed to death while he was sleeping at a Wushu association club, likely due to unsettled underworld conflicts. Although the police managed to identify a man named Chew Tse Meng (Chinese: 周志明; pinyin: Zhōu Zhìmíng; Pe̍h-ūe-jī: Tsiu Tsì-mêng) as the prime suspect, Chew was never caught and is still at large despite extensive investigations and search efforts. A coroner's inquiry recorded a verdict of murder in 2002 after hearing the case of Aw's death. As of 2024, the murder of Aw Teck Boon remains unsolved, and the murderer(s) have not been found.

== Background of Aw ==
Aw Teck Boon, the second of six or seven children, was born in Singapore in 1956; his father worked as a fishmonger. According to his younger sister, Aw became independent and lived separately from his parents and siblings during his teens, and he worked as a sailor for most of his life. He did not have a close relationship with his siblings and parents, but would occasionally visit them during every Chinese New Year, and he never spoke much about his life outside home. Aw's eldest brother committed suicide in 1986.

Apart from his time on the ocean, Aw Teck Boon joined the Sio Kun Tong gang (affiliated with the Salakau) (Note: Some sources stated that Aw was part of the Ang Soon Tong) during his younger years and he gradually rose through the ranks, and become a much-feared triad leader with at least 60 men under his wing, in addition to five or six bodyguards beside him wherever he went. In the past, Aw had also worked under Ah Long San (birth name Chua Tiong Tiong), Singapore's most notorious loan shark who was later jailed for ten years in 2001 on charges of giving bribes to several policemen; Ah Long San died from a heart attack in 2018.

Based on information of his gangland activities, Aw had managed at least 20 brothels in Geylang, and also collected extortion fees from the places under Sio Kun Tong's control, and in his heyday, Aw was able to single-handedly fight off several men in one go and was known to be merciless but willing to settle scores face to face with people who crossed his path. In the early 1980s, Aw and about 100 gang members were arrested for having killed a rival gang member during a clash with the deceased's gang, and he spent about ten years in detention under the Criminal Law (Temporary Provisions) Act (CLTPA) for being a kingpin of the underworld, in addition to armed robbery charges.

After his release from prison in the 1990s, Aw married a Thai woman who was around 15 years his junior. Together, Aw and his wife had one daughter Wendy, who was born in 1995, and they lived at a one-room flat at French Road, Jalan Besar. Aw and his wife and daughter lived a simple and frugal life in spite of Aw's influence in the underworld and the wealth he accumulated, partly because he often distribute his wealth to those in need, and the couple were a loving one. Aw himself had also gradually decreased his involvement in the gangland activities, but he continued to exert great influence in the underworld. Aw was also reported to often sail out at the sea and return to Singapore every few months to spend time with his family, and on average, he spent about two to three months in Singapore per year.

According to the residents of Geylang, as well as friends and neighbours of Aw, Aw was known to be a bad-tempered but kind-hearted person. He was notorious for his bad temper and weakness in alcohol, and was noted to have flew into a violent rage and picked fights very often whenever he had too much to drink at the coffeeshops he frequented in Geylang and Beach Road, and he would offend people while he was heavily drunk. However, many attested to Aw's frequent acts of kindness to those around him. A female neighbour recounted that she had known Aw for more than 30 years, and she often saw Aw lending money to those in need, and Aw himself also brought his gangland associates to the funerals of any neighbours who died. A 69-year-old homeless man also said that whenever he slept in the void decks in Jalan Besar, Aw would see him and generously gave him money. A former prisoner, who previously met Aw while in prison, stated that Aw, an avid workout enthusiast, had kindly advised him to be a good person and turn over a new leaf, and be a filial son to his mother, and he was touched by Aw's encouraging advice and words, and Aw would reassure his prison mates that they should not be dissatisfied with life. Whenever he sailed and returned to Singapore, Aw would also drink together with his friends at coffee shops in Beach Road, where he often hung out during his teens.

== Murder ==
On 5 May 1999, at about 3 am, 43-year-old Aw Teck Boon was murdered by an unknown assailant at Geylang.

Prior to his murder, Aw was said to be drinking at a Geylang coffeeshop the night before, and as a result of having drunk too much alcohol, Aw was feeling too tipsy and unable to go home on his own, and he decided to go to a Wushu association club in Geylang to sleep, which was his usual habit whenever he had too much to drink. Hours later, at around 3 am, a male tze char hawker arrived at the Wushu club to collect some plates from the place. Upon entry, the hawker discovered the body of 43-year-old Aw Teck Boon lying face down and called the police. At the time of the gruesome discovery, Aw's tattooed body had three stab wounds on his neck, armpit and waist, and there were reportedly no signs of a struggle, but the area where his body was found was full of bloodstains, and no murder weapons were recovered from the scene. At the time he died, Aw left behind his 28-year-old wife, his four-year-old daughter, his father and at least four siblings (Aw's mother had presumably died a few years back).

Many people were shocked to hear about the murder, given Aw's reputation as both a generous man and a notorious gang lord, and many were saddened to hear about his violent end due to the kindness Aw often expressed to the people around him. A neighbour stated that she never sensed anything out of the ordinary, as the day before he was killed, Aw had politely greeted the neighbours like he did normally and even told his daughter to stay home. Aw's friends, who all met him at Beach Road for drinks before he headed for Geylang, also noted that he seemed normal and nothing was amiss. According to two of Aw's bodyguards, they were originally supposed to accompany him and were alerted to the presence of three rival gang members roaming nearby, but Aw, who consumed drugs, did not think something would happen and hence asked them to leave, and shortly after this, Aw was found stabbed to death. Some sources also revealed that Aw had survived a brutal attack by some enemies at least one year before his murder, even though he was seriously injured as a result.

Over 100 people, including some policemen, had attended the funeral of Aw, which took place three days after his murder. Aw, an avid football fan, was reportedly dressed in a Newcastle football jersey, which was his favourite football team (Aw had placed big bets on the team regularly). 40-year-old businessman Aw Teck Lim, one of Aw's younger brothers, told the press that while his brother had gotten into trouble with the law before, he was still a good person by heart and he did not deserve such a brutal death. About 30 police detectives had attended Aw's funeral, not to pay respects but to maintain order and inspect for any suspicious people present at the wake. The atmosphere of the funeral was reportedly tense; while there were people coming to pay condolences, others only turned up not because of friendship but out of reluctance in order to maintain respect for the late gangland chief. While Aw's daughter was oblivious to the death of her father, Aw's wife was devastated over the death of her husband, and Aw's colleagues wanted to help her in order to allow her stay in Singapore and take care of the daughter. The Wushu club, where Aw was murdered, was also slated to move out in a month after the homicide.

In fact, Aw's murder was the second case of killing to happen in Geylang within that month itself, as the first case of murder, that of the rag-and-bone man S. Salim Ahmad, happened on 2 May 1999 at a Geylang coffeeshop. Salim's killer, a man named Seah Kok Meng, was sentenced to death for murder and hanged in 2001. Merely a week after Aw was murdered, 46-year-old Thai sex worker Sureerat Ratcharin was killed in a Geylang apartment, thus becoming the third murder to happen in Geylang during that month; the killing of Sureerat remains unsolved as of today.

== Investigations ==
Chew Tse Meng, who was wanted for the murder of Aw Teck Boon

The police classified the death of Aw Teck Boon as murder, and investigations were kick-started to trace any possible motives and suspects behind the murder. In Singapore, any offenders who were found guilty of murder would be sentenced to death under the law, provided that they were aged 18 and above when the crime was committed.

It was speculated that Aw could have been murdered due to unsettled gangland conflicts with other people. One theory was that Aw had offended a lot of people with his bad temper and drunken fits (one of these included a dispute at a funeral), and it provoked his rivals into attacking and killing him. Another theory was that Aw had owed money to his creditors after borrowing from loan sharks and other people, and it caused Aw to be killed over a monetary dispute. A third theory opined that about three killers were involved given the number of knives used and the culprits could have been someone known to Aw, especially his fellow gang members. In fact, a week before Aw's death, he was drinking together with a man who was not from his gang, and the two of them had a heated argument with each other, and after some other gang members helped to pacify the situation, the other man left in a huff, which was suspected to be a catalyst that led to Aw's murder. Another witness claimed that a gang clash happened a week prior between the rival gang and Aw's group while Aw and his group were having drinks, and Aw reportedly swore vengeance at the rival gang at the end of the fight.

After preliminary investigations, the police identified a prime suspect, a 38-year-old Singaporean citizen named Chew Tse Meng (alias Ah Say; Chinese: 阿势; Pe̍h-ōe-jī: A-Sè), (Note: His alias was also spelt as 阿塞 A-sek in Chinese) whose last known address was in Choa Chu Kang. However, Chew could not be located, and hence, the police placed him on the wanted list, seeking public assistance to trace his whereabouts. News sources in 1975 revealed that Chew, then 14 years old, was one of the nine teenagers charged with murdering a schoolboy Leong Keng Fatt during a gang fight, but the conviction and sentence of Chew in this case was unknown (given that offenders below 18 cannot be sentenced to death for murder but to indefinite detention under the President's Pleasure).

Merely two months after Aw was killed, the Singaporean crime show Crimewatch re-enacted his murder, and it first aired on television in July 1999. The episode that covered the killing of Aw also issued a public appeal for information or witnesses to help solve the case, with the assurance that all information would be kept strictly confidential, as well as releasing a warrant of arrest for Chew, who remained at large at that point for the unsolved slaying of Aw.

On 6 May 2002, three years after the murder, a coroner's court heard the case of Aw's death and issued a verdict of murder by person or persons unknown. During the coroner's inquiry, it was revealed that prior to his murder, Aw was seen quarrelling with Chew over some debts, which likely was the reason behind his death; a friend of Aw (who was present when the argument happened) testified that he had left the pair to go to the toilet but returned only to find Aw's body. The police investigations revealed that within the two hours after the estimated time of Aw's murder, Chew boarded a taxi and left Singapore via the Woodlands Checkpoint and fled to Malaysia.

== Aftermath ==
Three years after Aw Teck Boon was murdered, his 73-year-old father Aw Swee Seng was murdered by Aw's youngest brother Aw Teck Hock, who battered the elderly man to death during a drunken episode on 15 May 2002. Teck Hock, then a 37-year-old divorcee with two children (who lived with their mother), was arrested and charged with murder, but he was spared the death penalty after he was put on trial for a reduced charge of manslaughter, and sentenced to nine years' imprisonment after pleading guilty in October 2002. The violent deaths met by Aw, his father and eldest brother drew public attention to the unfortunate plight of Aw's family.

In January 2021, The Straits Times published an article that recalled the three most notorious gangsters from Singapore. The list included Aw, while the other two were Tan Chor Jin and Roland Tan; Tan Chor Jin, nicknamed Tony Kia or "One-Eyed Dragon", was found guilty and hanged in 2009 for the fatal shooting of nightclub owner Lim Hock Soon in 2006, while Roland Tan, nicknamed "Mr Big", was wanted by Singaporean police for the 1969 unsolved murder of Lam Cheng Siew at Bras Basah, but he escaped prosecution by fleeing to the Netherlands and established a drug trafficking syndicate Ah Kong. He then relinquished control of Ah Kong and relocated to Denmark, where he lived out his remaining years as a restaurant owner and died from a heart attack in 2020.

Government sources assert that since the death of Aw in 1999, gangsterism was gradually all but eradicated in Singapore, even though it is still an issue in Singapore society, and this was attributed to the tougher laws, enforcement and prevention programmes. Aw's killing was also speculated to be the mark of decline of the phenomenon of gangsterism, and it was also coupled by the indefinite detention of older gang members without trial under the Criminal Law (Temporary Provisions) Act (CLTPA).

The murder of Aw Teck Boon remains unsolved, and the prime suspect, Chew Tse Meng, remains on the run.

== See also ==
- List of major crimes in Singapore
