= Tan Chor Jin =

Singaporean gang member executed for murder

- Tan Chor Jin in 2006
- Born: 29 March 1966; Singapore
- Died: 9 January 2009 (aged 42); Changi Prison, Singapore
- Cause of death: Execution by hanging
- Other names: Tony Kia, One-eyed Dragon
- Status: Executed
- Allegiance: Ang Soon Tong
- Conviction: One charge of unlawfully discharging a firearm under the Arms Offences Act (1 count)
- Penalty: Death
- Accomplices: Lim Choon Chwee, alias Ah Chwee (Tan's childhood friend) - failure to report a robbery (six months' imprisonment); Ho Yueh Keong, alias Moh Tang - abetting Tan to escape Singapore (20 months' imprisonment)

Details
- Victims: 1
- Date: 15 February 2006
- Country: Singapore
- Date apprehended: 25 February 2006

Tan Chor Jin (Chinese: 陈楚仁; Pe̍h-ōe-jī: Tân Chhó͘-jîn; pinyin: Chén Chǔrén; 29 March 1966 – 9 January 2009), also known by his alias Tony Kia, was a Singaporean gang leader known for fatally shooting 41-year-old Lim Hock Soon, his former friend and nightclub owner, using a semi-automatic Beretta .22 calibre pistol on 15 February 2006. Tan, who had underworld affiliations and was a member of Ang Soon Tong since his early years, had also robbed the Lim family of their valuables before he escaped Singapore to Malaysia, where he was arrested ten days later. The media gave him the name "One-eyed Dragon" given that he was blind in the right eye.

Subsequently, Tan was charged with the execution-style murder of Lim, though the charge was later amended to one of an unlawful discharge of a firearm with intent to cause hurt or death in Singapore. Both charges were known to warrant the mandatory death sentence if found guilty, yet Tan chose to represent himself in his defence during the court proceedings, which failed and led to Tan being sentenced to death as a result of a lack of evidence in his favour. After losing his appeals, Tan was hanged on 9 January 2009. His two accomplices, who played a part in assisting Tan to commit the crime and to escape Singapore, were each sentenced to six and twenty months' imprisonment in 2006 and 2016 respectively.

== Early life ==
Tan Chor Jin, the youngest of seven children, was born on 29 March 1966. Tan's parents were originally from Guangdong, China before they immigrated to Singapore in the 1950s, and they worked as food stall owners to make ends meet.

Tan, who had two sisters and four brothers, grew up living in a three-room flat at Kim Keat. He was very close to his siblings and filial to his parents. His father and mother died of old age in 1997 and 1998 respectively.

Tan spoke little English, but he could understand Chinese and a bit of Malay.

== Adult years and criminal career ==
As he grew into adulthood, Tan Chor Jin joined the Ang Soon Tong gang, which existed since the 1950s and had a vast criminal network in trafficking drugs and arms, and both illegal money lending and gambling. Tan had also engaged in such activities, and during his time in the gang, Tan rose through the ranks and became a feared triad leader of the underworld. He also engaged into a career as an illegal bookie who collect horse-racing and football bets at a coffee shop in Balestier Road.

Sometime in the 1980s, Tan was jailed for five years in Changi Prison for gang-related activities, including rioting and fighting. A former inmate from the prison reported that during his time of imprisonment, Tan was well-behaved and spent most of his time studying. He also liked to play Chinese chess during his free time, even when he was not in prison.

Aside from his gangland connections, Tan began to open a shop that sold traditional Chinese medicine in Malaysia. He later expanded the business into a branch of four shops, and also expanded into the trade of Chinese religious products and penchants. He became affluent enough to own branded cars. Despite his gangster affiliations, Tan never talked about them in his home and never brought his friends to his siblings’ homes. Even when he smoked, he did not do so in front of his family members and only did it near the window out of respect for them. According to one of Tan's older brothers, he said that Tan was close to his three children, and they fondly looked up to him as an uncle they liked.

Tan was married in 2001 to Siau Fang Fang (Chinese: 萧芳芳; pinyin: Xiāo Fāngfāng), a Malaysian who was born in 1981. Even though he moved to Hougang after his marriage, he lived with his wife and in-laws in Malaysia, where he operated his business. He had no children with Siau. Tan would later on have a mistress named Lian Yee Hwa (Chinese: 连依华; pinyin: Lián Yīhuá), who was the same age as his wife. Together, he and Lian had two children, a daughter (born 2002) and a son (born 2006).

In 1999, Tan had a traffic accident. Although he survived it, Tan suffered an eye injury due to the broken glass pieces having flown into his right eye during the crash, which pierced through and thus blinded him in the right eye.

== Murder of Lim Hock Soon ==
=== Robbery and murder ===
Lim Hock Soon
- Lim Hock Soon, the victim
- Born: Lim Hock Soon c. 1965; Singapore
- Died: 15 February 2006 (aged 41); Serangoon, Singapore
- Cause of death: A gunshot wound to the right temple
- Resting place: An unspecified cemetery in Singapore
- Other names: Milk Pig/Guni Ter; Lim Piggy; Ah Pui; Fei Lo
- Occupation: Nightclub owner
- Employer: Himself
- Known for: Murder victim
- Spouse: Kok Pooi Leng
- Children: 1

Early on the morning of 15 February 2006, at a HDB block in Serangoon, a family living in one of the block's second-floor units was robbed of their valuables, with the patriarch of the family being shot dead.

In that same morning, the police were contacted and they arrived at the scene. They entered the flat of the family, and found a dead body riddled with five gunshot wounds in one of the rooms. The victim was recognised as Lim Hock Soon (Chinese: 林福顺; Pe̍h-ōe-jī: Lîm Hok-sūn; pinyin: Lín Fúshùn), a 41-year-old owner of a famous nightclub in Singapore (the Las Vegas KTV lounge on Havelock Road). Lim's family was also earlier robbed of their valuables. The police also found a total of six used cartridges on the floor of the study, along with a chair that was damaged by one of the spent bullets. The wounds were found on Lim's left arm, right temple, right cheek, back and, left thigh.

According to Lim's 33-year-old Malaysian wife Kok Pooi Leng (Chinese: 郭佩玲; Jyutping: Gwok3 Pui3 Ling4; pinyin: Guō Pèilíng), Lim's 13-year-old daughter, and Lim's 22-year-old Indonesian maid Risa Erawati Ning Tyas, all three of them testified that they were being threatened by a Chinese man wearing black clothes and black cap, who was holding a gun and a knife. The complete sequence of events started at 55 minutes past six o’clock when Lim's daughter, the first and only child of Lim and his wife, was preparing to go to school. She saw the man appearing at her doorstep, telling her to go inside as he wanted to rob them. Risa, who often would bring her employer's daughter to school, was also held at gun point by the man.

After locking the door, the gunman forced the maid and daughter into the living room. Lim, who was sleeping on a mattress inside the living room, was rudely awakened by the gunman, who pointed the gun at him and told him and the others to go into the master bedroom, where Lim's wife was also awakened from her sleep. Having forced all four into the master bedroom, the robber forced Lim's wife to surrender their valuables and place them in his bag. Then, the gunman told Lim to tie up his family with towels.

Afterwards, the Lim family and maid was taken into Lim's study at gunpoint, and from his safe, Lim additionally gave the gunman more of his cash and possessions. In total, the gunman received $170,000 in cash and property, including assorted jewellery, four Rolex watches and foreign currencies (including Thai baht). After this, the gunman remained in the flat, ordering Lim's wife to use the TV cable wire to tie Lim's hands. As Lim pleaded with the gunman to not hurt his maid and family, the gunman told them to go into different rooms. The maid went into Lim's daughter's bedroom and Lim's wife and daughter were forced into the master bedroom, while both Lim and the gunman stayed in the study.

The family later told police that, after they went into their respective rooms, they heard gunshots coming from Lim's study, and from there they had realised that Lim was killed. Additionally, Risa, the family maid, spoke to the police that prior to her employer's death, she peeked outside the bedroom and saw both Lim and the gunman, who seem to know each other, engaging in a heated row, but she could not make out what they were talking about. Risa said that the mysterious man in black suddenly used his left hand to point the gun at Lim's face and fired at close range. Lim cried out in pain and collapsed. Risa said that at the sight of Lim being shot, she quickly moved back and covered her ears, in which she heard more shots but could not make out how many times the gunman fired his gun. However, the common description the family gave of the gunman was, the man had one abnormal eye.

Before he left, the one-eyed murderer went to the room where Lim's wife and daughter were confined in, outrightly stating that Lim deserved to die, as he had gone too far and it was his fault, over whatever personal issues he had with Lim. He also threatened Lim's wife to not report him or he will come back to kill her and her family.

=== Identification of the gunman ===
According to the man's description, and having asked questions to Lim's acquaintances about the mysterious one-eyed man, the police identified the suspected one-eyed killer as Tan Chor Jin, who was an old acquaintance of Lim. According to one of Lim's close acquaintances, he told police that Tan, also known as Tony Kia to secret society members, had borrowed some $30,000 from Lim, who was known as "Guni Ter" or Milk Pig in the underworld due to his obesity. Tan had never returned the money to Lim, resulting in Lim taking the friend to come with him to Malaysia in 2003 to confront Tan and asked him to return the money. Tan was said to have asked for more time to raise the sum, and he was never heard from again until the day before Lim's death, where he approached Lim at around 3 am, as he wanted to borrow more money. Lim's friend informed the police that Lim was said to be fearful as Tan knew where he lived despite the fact that he never gave Tan his address.

The police then began to place Tan's name on the wanted list and asked the public through the media to inform the police if they had any information about Tan and his whereabouts. Having found out that Tan had left Singapore through the Woodlands Checkpoint, they also asked the Malaysian police for help to capture Tan, who went into hiding in Malaysia.

=== Ah Chwee's account ===
Soon after they launched a manhunt for Tan, the police received news that a 38-year-old man named Lim Choon Chwee (Chinese: 林春水; Pe̍h-ōe-jī: Lîm Chhun-chúi; pinyin: Lín Chūnshuǐ), better known as Ah Chwee (Chinese: 阿水; Pe̍h-ōe-jī: A Chúi; pinyin: Āh shuǐ), surrendered himself. When he was brought back for questioning in the CID, Ah Chwee admitted that he knew Tan and the one-eyed killer's plan to rob Lim, but he said he was not aware that Tan would kill Lim Hock Soon.

In his statements, Ah Chwee, who was Tan's childhood friend and fellow gang member from Ang Soon Tong, said that when he received word from a friend that Tan was in Singapore and Tan was looking for him. Ah Chwee then met up with Tan in the friend's flat and on Tan's request, he drove him to Lim's place of residence in Serangoon in the early hours of 15 February 2006, hours before Lim met his end in Tan's hands. Ah Chwee said he noticed that Tan brought along a black bag but he did not know that it contained a gun, knife and some spare ammunition.

Ah Chwee said that ten minutes after they reached Serangoon, Tan, who alighted the car as soon as they parked the car, returned and as they left, Tan asked Ah Chwee where he could steal a Rolex watch. Ah Chwee said that he was puzzled about Tan's question and asked him why. Tan then confided in him that he was facing a lot of financial troubles and quite down in his luck. They went back to Ah Chwee's friend's house to watch a football match for two hours before Tan asked him to drive him back to Lim's neighbourhood again.

After they reached Serangoon, Ah Chwee remained in the car as Tan went into the block to look for Lim, this time armed and ready to rob the nightclub owner. This time, the wait lasted for 30 minutes, and Tan returned, with a white plastic bag full of the money and valuables he stole from Lim and seemingly flustered (as he killed Lim earlier on). Ah Chwee recounted that Tan asked him to drive to the canal nearby the house of Ah Chwee's friend. Tan was said to have gone there to do something. Afterwards, they went back to the friend's house, and contacted a Malaysian named Ho Yueh Keong (Chinese: 何岳强; pinyin: Hé Yuèqiáng), alias Moh Tang, who subsequently went out of Malaysia together with Tan. Ho had earlier on helped drive Tan into Singapore on the day before Lim Hock Soon's murder and reportedly knew in January 2006 that Tan had planned to murder Lim.

With the crucial information from Ah Chwee, the police were directed to search the waters in the canal. The search yielded a semi-automatic Beretta .22-calibre pistol, and some unused ammunition. Ah Chwee was subsequently placed under arrest and charged with abetting Tan to commit murder. Ho Yueh Keong, the alleged accomplice who helped Tan escape Singapore, also had his name placed on the wanted list.

=== Forensic evidence ===
Having received the murder weapon, the scientists from the Health Sciences Authority, Vicky Chow and Lim Chin Chin, test fired the gun and ascertained that it was indeed the same gun which Tan used to kill Lim Hock Soon, after matching the spent cartridges to the gun. The two scientists had also reconstructed the crime scene based on the different locations of where they found the cartridge cases and gunshot residue. It was deduced that when Lim was shot six times, one of the shots hit the chair, while as for the rest of the shots, Lim was possibly moving around the room when he was shot. Although she was unable to decipher the full sequence of how the six shots were fired, Dr Lim Chin Chin deduced that the final shot was the one at the victim's right temple, which was fired near the doorway of Lim Hock Soon's study. She stated that if it was one of the initial shots, there would have been traces of blood flowing down the head and neck and onto the collar of Lim's shirt; instead, there was little blood found nearby the wound.

According to Dr Lim, the gun was fired close-range at Lim Hock Soon's face from a MTT (muzzle-to-target) distance of less than 10 cm because of the presence of searing and a powder tattooing pattern of about 3 cm in diameter. The MTT distance for the wounds at the back and at the left thigh was estimated at between 100 and 150 cm, meaning that the shooting range was quite far away. Finally, it was concluded from all the forensic evidence that the shots at the deceased's right temple and left arm were fired at close ranges with MTT distances of 10 to 25 cm, resulting in the presence of powder tattooing patterns of 6 to 8 cm in diameter around the two small circular wounds. The bloodstains around his body were said to appear undisturbed, meaning that after he laid down, he likely did not move after that. These above information would be crucial to discredit Tan's later claim of self-defence against Lim, who allegedly attacked him, since it was unlikely for Lim to have done so and he was defenceless at the time Tan shot him.

Dr Teo Eng Swee, the pathologist who performed the autopsy on the victim, determined that the cause of Lim's death was the gunshot wound to Lim's right temple. The bullet had cut through a large part of the brain, which damaged it and killed Lim. The bullet did not exit the skull, and it stopped right under the skin of the left side of the head, which formed a laceration behind Lim's left ear, meaning that the head of the victim was pressed against a hard surface like a floor. It meant that Lim was possibly defenceless at this point of time.

== Fugitive status and arrest ==
=== On the run in Malaysia ===
While the Singapore police were still investigating, the Royal Malaysian Police managed to trace the whereabouts of Tan Chor Jin, who met up with an old friend and local ganglord after he arrived in Malaysia. The ganglord happened to be watched by Malaysian police officers, who then noticed Tan and trailed him as well, which they continued to do after updating the Singaporean authorities about this.

Tan, who planned to go to Chiang Mai, Thailand, spent the next few days staying in cheap places. On 25 February 2006, he decided to check into a five-star hotel called Grand Plaza Park Royal Hotel in Kuala Lumpur, where he went to procure a fake passport under his alias Tony Kia. The Malaysian police went to the hotel to monitor his movements, with a plan to capture him.

=== Capture ===
At around midnight, Tan, who was together with his wife and four others in one of the three rooms they booked, wanted Hainanese chicken rice, which he ordered through room service. An undercover Malaysian policeman posed as a waiter and delivered the food to Tan's room on the 13th floor. The cop used the chance to scan the room's layout and how many were with Tan. A listening device was stuck on one of the dishes. Tan and the others went to bed at around 2 am, and two hours later, a 12-member police team arrived at the three rooms, where they arrested Tan and the others.

The police searched the rooms and found a total of six guns, 203 bullets, two pairs of handcuffs, and 4 kg of ketamine, with a street value of nearly $22,000. Tan tried to bargain with the Malaysian police to give them information about where he purchased the gun and the people who helped him to do so in exchange for not getting handed over to the Singaporean police, which was unsuccessful. One of the five other people arrested happened to be Ngoi Yew Fatt, a Singaporean gangster and murder suspect who was wanted by Singapore for another murder that took place in Yishun the year before Tan's crime. Another of the five arrested was also wanted for an unsolved murder in Malaysia.

Guns and drugs seized during capture of Tan Chor Jin

=== Extradition and indictment of Tan ===
On 1 March 2006, despite his supposed fear of flying, Tan was extradited back to Singapore by flight, with the Singaporean police officers escorting him on the trip. After he arrived in Singapore and taken to the local courts, Tan was officially charged with first-degree murder (or intentional murder) under the Penal Code. If found guilty, it would be the death penalty Tan was waiting for. After which, Tan was taken back to the crime scene by CID police officers to re-enact his case. Reportedly, both Lim's widow and Lim's elderly mother, the latter who lived next to her son's home, shouted and hurled expletives at Tan upon seeing him, telling him to go to hell and to pay for what he did. Later, a lawyer named John Abraham was assigned to defend Tan in his upcoming trial for murder. Tan was also remanded in Changi Prison for psychiatric assessment.

According to Tan's wife, when she visited her husband in police custody, Tan confessed to having an affair and had children with the mistress. He also asked her to meet up with his mistress, who received news of his arrest from the Malaysian media. The two women, who were initially hostile to each other when they first met, later calmed down as they found themselves in the same boat and it was pointless to be angry. They reportedly got along like sisters, and were always together during their visits to Tan while he was in prison. Tan's wife also said that her husband wanted her to remarry in light of the imminent fate he was facing. In August 2006, Tan's mistress gave birth to their second child, a son, but Tan could not visit his child even though his wife was present in the hospital.

=== Status of the two accomplices ===
As for the other two accomplices, one of them, Malaysian Ho Yueh Keong, who earlier assisted Tan to flee Singapore, remained on the police's wanted list as of the time when Tan was taken into custody.

The other accomplice Ah Chwee, who surrendered himself prior to Tan's capture and faced a charge of abetting murder, was subsequently given a discharge not amounting to an acquittal, and he eventually received a jail term of six months for his failure to report the robbery to the police. Ah Chwee's sentence was backdated to the date when he was first detained in remand six months before, and he was released on the same day he was sentenced.

Ah Chwee would later become one of the prosecution's key witnesses against Tan, who was dubbed the "One-Eyed Dragon" in Singapore's newspapers due to his abnormal one eye.

== Conviction by the High Court ==
=== Amendment of capital charge ===
In August 2006, while Tan was still awaiting trial, the prosecution decided to dismiss the murder charge and instead proceed with a fresh charge of an unlawful discharge of a firearm with the intention to cause death or hurt under the Arms Offences Act of Singapore (enacted since 1973). If convicted of this new charge, Tan Chor Jin would still face the gallows.

According to a memoir written by criminal lawyer Subhas Anandan (who would later represent Tan in his appeal), he stated that should the prosecution maintained the first-degree murder charge against Tan, their burden of proof was to prove an intention to kill and all Tan would need to do was to put up a defence of no intention to kill or diminished responsibility, which would reduce the murder charge to a lesser, non-capital conviction of culpable homicide not amounting to murder. However, the prosecution's replacement of the new charge would mean that regardless of whether Tan suffered from abnormality of mind or not, and regardless of whether he killed accidentally or not, Tan would still be found guilty and face the death penalty because these defences would not be effective against the charge of illegally firing a gun, as long as the prosecution could prove that he had indeed done so, and furthermore, that shot took away a life. According to Anandan, he claimed that Tan was shocked and dumbfounded to discover the amendment as he thought he could call his psychiatrist to testify for him on his behalf to support the defence of diminished responsibility.

=== Trial ===
Before the start of the trial, despite having such a serious sentence on his head, Tan decided to dismiss his original lawyer John Abraham and represent himself. Despite being informed that he could have a lawyer assigned to him pro bono, including the possibility of being assigned up to two lawyers, Tan still did not accept the request and thus he himself stood trial unrepresented. Tan was the second reported person to represent himself in a capital case, and about 16 years before him, Hensley Anthony Neville was the first person doing so when he was tried for the rape and murder of Lim Hwee Huang, a 19-year-old interior designer. 33-year-old Neville was subsequently sentenced to death in November 1990 and hanged after failing in his own defence at trial.

According to Anandan, Tan dismissed his original lawyer because Abraham allegedly could not help him get any cigarettes, or to help him to transfer him from his Changi Prison psychiatric cell to Queenstown Remand Prison. Prisoners in Singapore at that time were not allowed to have cigarettes in prisons. Tan, who suffered from withdrawal symptoms, had repeatedly asked the judge throughout the trial if he could smoke in prison, but to no avail. He explained his desire to smoke in prison by saying that, "a car without petrol cannot go; my mind without cigarettes cannot think."

In the trial, which began on 22 January 2007, Tan cross-examined the witnesses and called his own witnesses. He even warned the witnesses to not lie about what he did when their answers were not in his favour. From what Anandan researched about Tan before he began to defend him in his appeal, he stated that Tan had done his best to do so, but the problems were that Tan was always missing the important and relevant points, being too emotional and dramatic in some aspects while defending himself, and being untrained in law, Tan naturally did not do much of a successful defence against the charge he was facing.

Regardless, in his trial, Tan gave his account of what happened. He claimed that he only wanted to scare Lim as he feared that Lim might send someone to kill him. A few years ago, Tan and Lim ran an illegal horse racing and football betting ring, in which he accepted the monetary bets placed by Lim's runners. By April 2004, he said, the runners had suffered from losses of $220,000 but Lim refused to settle the debt. In 2005, Tan discovered that Mr Lim had ordered people to go after him and kill him. Hence, he went to Thailand to buy a semi-automatic Beretta .22-calibre pistol in Johor for self-defence, and to settle scores with him while trying to not having an undue disadvantage given his blind right eye. He said that on that morning of 15 February 2006 at 3 am, three hours before Lim's death, he went there with a plan to settle their issues peacefully but Lim rudely rejected him and closed the door on his face. To rebut the fact that he owed the victim money, Tan even tried to portray himself as an affluent and generous businessman without any money problems by cross-examining his friends, who appeared in the court, to make them tell the court that Tan had made donations of RM100,000 to a Taoist temple in late 2005, as well as making a purchase of a Buddhist pendant with a monetary amount between S$20,000 (RM46,000) and S$30,000 (RM69,000) in cash in January 2006.

Tan also put up a multi-pronged defence against the arms charge. The first tier of Tan's defence was that he actually fired the shots in self-defence when the victim Lim Hock Soon allegedly raised a chair and charged at Tan with an attempt to attack him. The second tier was Tan's pistol had misfired and the hurt or death caused was accidental. The final tier was that Tan, who had drunk some alcohol with his friends prior to the attack, had been intoxicated with alcohol when he killed Lim, meaning his mental responsibility was impaired.

However, the above account, especially the defences, did not work for Tan in his favour. For the first tier of defence, it failed as the prosecution had pointed out that it was not possible for Lim to be able to lift up the chair since his hands were being tied. The second tier of defence was also unsuccessful as one of the expert witnesses - David Loo, an arms specialist from the police's Armament Branch - test fired the gun and found that the gun had not malfunctioned. Loo also told the judge in court that even if the gun did misfire, it would not fire more than one shot. The third and final tier of defence also flew out of the window due to the psychiatrist, Dr R. Munidasa Winslow, whom Tan called as a witness to support his defence of intoxication resulting in impairment of his faculties, had unexpectedly sold him out and stated that Tan was not suffering from any abnormality of the mind and the level of alcohol consumed by Tan was not sufficient to impair his mental responsibility, even if he was genuinely drunk at that time. The psychiatrist was said to have explained to Tan earlier before the trial that such a defence may be relevant to rebut a murder charge, but it was not relevant to rebut the firearms charge he was facing, as it would still warrant him a conviction even if he was not mentally sound at the time of the shooting. Tan was reportedly enraged about what he perceived was a calculated betrayal on the part of the psychiatrist and had called him all sorts of names publicly in the courtroom.

In the midst of the trial, Tan suddenly pleaded with the judge to sentence him to death. Mainly, Tan claimed that he was doing so out of love for his wife, Siau Fang Fang, because there were instances where Siau received death threats from members of the public due to her husband's killing of Lim and publicity of the case. When Siau took the stand once, she showed the court one of the messages, which said if Tan did not pay with his life for Lim's cold-blooded murder, Siau shall be the one who would pay with her life for this. Despite this, the trial continued on. Siau, who was present throughout the court proceedings, was said to be touched to hear this. Tan's mistress was said to be absent throughout the trial as she was dedicating her time to take care of her two young children, though she would still get updates about the developments of the trial.

In his closing submissions, Deputy Public Prosecutor (DPP) Chew Chin Yee, who was assisted by his colleague Edwin San in this case, argued that Tan's testimony was not to be believed, given that it was built on untruthfulness, it was constructively evasive and at times, it was ludicrous to the point of reinforcing his guilt. As such they urged the court to convict Tan of illegally discharging his gun six times and sentenced him to death, since he did so with the intention to hurt and kill the victim.

When it was Tan's turn to give his closing submissions, Tan was not sure of what to do, as he himself was not a professional lawyer. The judge, who gave Tan some time and writing materials to prepare and asked him what he needed, heard Tan making a request, "If I say I need a lawyer now, how?" The judge, however, did not accept Tan's request for a lawyer to help him sum up his case.

=== Verdict ===
At the end of the trial on 22 May 2007, the High Court found Tan guilty and sentenced him to death.

In his judgement, Justice Tay Yong Kwang dismissed Tan's defences. He described the claim of accidental shooting as a "laughable fantasy", since it needed firm grip and strength to pull the trigger, and there was no automatic function in the gun that enabled multiple shots through one single pull of the trigger, and instead, the gun could only fire a single shot by one pull of the trigger. Therefore, it was unlikely to say that Tan had accidentally fired at Lim.

Justice Tay further explained in his written verdict that Tan has not rebutted or denied the fact that he fired his gun, hence there should be a presumption that he did so with an intent to kill or hurt. Having carried an illegal, unlicensed weapon like a Beretta handgun, there was no legal basis for Tan to carry it regardless of whether he really wanted to negotiate or threaten Lim regarding their personal issues. Since he entered Lim's matrimonial home in such an armed, menacing manner, Lim has the right to self-defence even if it was true that he did carry a chair to attack Tan, given that the one-eyed gunman was the aggressor, and such a right remains even if Lim fought and injure or kill Tan. Besides, the chair and other objects in Lim's study were still arranged in an orderly manner, which meant Lim never used the chair at all like what Tan claimed.

From the evidence, Justice Tay also rubbished Tan's claims of alcohol intoxication resulting in diminished responsibility, given that he practically was able to recall the events that took place clearly. He was able to maintain his momentum and clearly converse with the victims when he gave them his orders to go into separate rooms and for them to hand over their cash and jewelry. He was still able to instruct Ah Chwee to drive him to the river where he disposed of his weapons, as well as preparing to flee the country with his spoils and triumphantly telling Ah Chwee to read the news about the shooting before his escape. These actions, from Justice Tay's words, showed that Tan was in control of his faculties at the time, and instead of being drunk, his actions were those of an "assured and accomplished assassin".

The judge accepted the testimonies of Lim's family members, particularly the maid Risa's account of what happened when she saw Tan shooting Lim in the face first. He was satisfied that Risa was telling the truth, since she had no reason to lie against Tan as she was merely a foreigner who wanted to earn a better life for herself and her family in Indonesia, and had no prior hatred of Tan. She was merely fulfilling her promise to her deceased employer to tell the truth rather than spreading words of falsehood and malice. The medical evidence supplied by Lim Chin Chin and Vicky Chow had also shown that the "One-eyed Dragon" had indeed fired at Lim's face at a close range. From Dr Teo Eng Swee's autopsy report, it was emphasised by the pathologist that when the fatal shot was fired at Lim's right temple, he was already lying on the floor and was defenceless against Tan. Therefore, with finality, Justice Tay ruled that Tan had done so with the intention of murdering Lim, and he succeeded.

As such, for illegally shooting his gun and intentionally causing the death of Lim Hock Soon, 41-year-old Tan Chor Jin was hereby sentenced to death in accordance with the Arms Offences Act. Before he was led away to Changi Prison to officially serve incarceration on death row, Tan asked the judge if he would be hanged the next day, and then again, he asked for cigarettes. There was no answer.

== Appeals and hanging ==
=== Court of Appeal ===
After he received the death sentence, Tan had told newspapers that he wanted Singapore's top lawyer to represent him in his appeal. Subhas Anandan, who was known to be the best of all the leading criminal lawyers from Singapore (at that time) and had defended several high-profile criminals (including Anthony Ler, Took Leng How and, Leong Siew Chor) prior, agreed to represent Tan in his appeal. In this appeal process, Anandan was assisted by his nephew Sunil Sudheesan, a newly qualified lawyer who did his pupilage under his wing.

In his memoir, it was revealed that prior to Tan's trial, Anandan actually received a request from someone to defend Tan in his trial. Anandan admitted in his book that he did not accept the request, because Anandan himself was actually a close friend of the victim Lim Hock Soon. Anandan wrote that before Lim's untimely death, he was a long-time customer of Lim's nightclub, and had patronised the place with his clients and colleagues, hence he became acquainted with Lim and Lim's family members. From his personal relationship with Lim, Anandan affectionately called his friend "Lim Piggy" due to Lim's large weight.

The lawyer said in his book that he felt uneasiness at the thought of having to cross-examine Lim's daughter and wife, whom he knew and who witnessed the death of their father and husband, and it would be quite embarrassing to do so given the existing relationship between him and Lim's bereaved family. Hence he did not accept the request to defend Tan in his original trial, leading to Tan having to engage another lawyer and subsequently chose to represent himself. As for why did he agree to represent Tan in his appeal, Anandan explained that in hearing the appeals, there was no need to cross-examine any witnesses while arguing the appeals, hence he did not mind to do so since he would not come face to face with Lim's family as the lawyer who defended the killer of their loved one.

In the appeal hearing, Anandan argued that the original trial judge had erred in rejecting Tan's request for a lawyer to make closing arguments for his case, which thus led to Tan not having a fair trial. He also raised Tan's original three-tier defence against the charge of illegal firing of his gun, and said that the judge should have made a closer inspection of the credibility of the witnesses’ testimony by visiting the crime scene, especially the maid's evidence of what she saw from the room regarding Tan's shooting of Lim.

After hearing the appeal, the three-judge panel – Andrew Phang, Tan Lee Meng, and V K Rajah – of the Court of Appeal decided to turn down the appeal. They rejected the three-tier defence made by Tan against the charge, and to them, Anandan's arguments of denial of a fair trial and other factors did not hold much weight as there was overwhelming evidence to prove that Tan was guilty of the murder of Lim Hock Soon, hence a re-trial was not appropriate. The choice of visiting the crime scene was entirely up to the discretion of the judge and was not amounting to a basis for the Court of Appeal to intervene and amend. As a result of this appeal's dismissal, Tan's death sentence was upheld, bringing Tan one step closer to the gallows.

=== Clemency appeal ===
After the loss of his appeal, Tan's final appeal was to petition to the President of Singapore to plead for clemency, which would allow Tan's death sentence to be reduced to life imprisonment if successful. Tan was said to be initially reluctant to sign the petition as he had long become ready to die, but he did it anyway.

When pending his submission of the petition, during one prison visit by his lawyers, Tan asked Anandan if the submission deadline can be postponed and the process be delayed. Anandan wrote that when he asked why, Tan replied that he just had a son, who was two years old in 2008, and the young boy had started to call him "Papa" (translated as father in Chinese). He said he was ready to die, but he just wanted to spend more time with the little boy and hear him calling his father a few months more. While the lawyer suggested that he should change lawyers so that he could get more time to prepare his clemency petition, Tan refused to do so as he was grateful to Anandan for agreeing to take his case and helping him, and he said that it would only mislead people into thinking that the lawyer was dismissed based on whichever errors he did to his client.

After submitting the clemency plea, it was decided by the President of Singapore that Tan's appeal should be dismissed on 5 January 2009. The execution was scheduled to commence four days later on 9 January 2009 at dawn.

=== Death row and execution ===
During the process of appeals, Tan Chor Jin was confined on death row in Changi Prison. He was said to have converted to Buddhism while in jail, and adopted a Buddhist name for himself. He also befriended some of the death row inmates, including Leong Siew Chor, a notorious murderer who killed his 22-year-old lover Liu Hong Mei before dismembering her body into seven pieces and abandoning them at Kallang River. Leong was hanged at the age of 52 on 30 November 2007 for this gruesome crime. Coincidentally, Leong was one of the clients of Tan's lawyer Subhas Anandan.

During the final days of his life, there were more than 100 relatives and acquaintances who went to pay their last visits to Tan, with each visit stretched to a few hours. One of Tan's nephews was so distraught that he fainted and had to be taken to another room to rest given the huge amount of respect he fondly had for his uncle and the notion that Tan would be executed. As his last meal before his execution, Tan ate his family's home-cooked meal, which included abalone, his favourite food, as he sat together with his family members. He also made a final wish to atone his sins and save lives by donating his organs, specifically his kidneys, liver and the cornea of his remaining eye. One of them was rumoured to be donated to Tang Wee Sung, a businessman who tried to illegally purchase a kidney for transplant, as he was said to have received it soon after Tan's hanging.

On 9 January 2009, 42-year-old Tan Chor Jin was hanged at dawn. According to a monk, who accompanied Tan for the last three hours before his execution, he said that Tan had passed on peacefully. His body was cremated and the ashes were scattered into the sea after his funeral.

== Aftermath ==
=== Fate of accomplice Ho Yueh Keong ===
Ho Yueh Keong, the Malaysian who assisted Tan in escaping Singapore, spent a total of nine years and five months on the run by hiding in Malaysia. In July 2015, Ho was finally caught by Malaysian police when he tried to go to Batam, Indonesia from Malaysia, and he was brought back to Singapore to face charges of helping Tan to escape from Singapore and concealing information about the murder of Lim Hock Soon.

On 8 August 2016, after standing trial in a district court, 43-year-old Ho Yueh Keong, who fathered a child (aged 3 in 2016) while on the run, pleaded guilty to abetting Tan's escape while the other charge of withholding evidence was taken into consideration during sentencing. Two days after his conviction, Ho was sentenced to 20 months’ imprisonment on 10 August 2016.

=== Fate of Ngoi Yew Fatt ===
Ngoi Yew Fatt, the other Singaporean murder suspect who was arrested together with Tan Chor Jin in Malaysia, was eventually extradited to Singapore for trial in 2009 after undergoing criminal investigations for unrelated offences in Malaysia. He was convicted of causing grievous hurt resulting in death, and sentenced to two years and nine months' imprisonment. Ngoi was released in 2011, and he later died in a traffic accident on 24 February 2013, at the age of 54.

=== In the media ===
This case was re-enacted in Singaporean crime show Crimewatch. It first aired as the fourth episode of the show's annual season in June 2009. In this episode, Tan was portrayed by Christopher Chew, who was physically taller and thinner than Tan's real-life counterpart and more fluent in speaking English, but the details about Tan and his crime in this episode were largely faithful of those of Tan in real-life.

This case was also recorded in Subhas Anandan's memoir The Best I Could, which features his early life, career and his notable cases. The memoir was adapted into a TV show of the same name, which ran for two seasons. Tan's case was re-enacted and aired as the third episode of the show's first season, though some aspects of the case were altered for dramatic purposes. In this re-enactment, Tan was portrayed without his trademark one abnormal eye and instead possessed normal vision in both eyes.

In July 2015, Singapore's national daily newspaper The Straits Times published a e-book titled Guilty As Charged: 25 Crimes That Have Shaken Singapore Since 1965, which included the case of Tan Chor Jin as one of the top 25 crimes that shocked the nation since its independence in 1965. The book was borne out of collaboration between the Singapore Police Force and the newspaper itself. The e-book was edited by ST News Associate editor Abdul Hafiz bin Abdul Samad. The paperback edition of the book was published and first hit bookshelves in June 2017. The paperback edition first entered the ST bestseller list on 8 August 2017, a month after publication.

=== Posthumous notoriety ===
In February 2020, when the Singapore Police Force (SPF) commemorated its 200th anniversary by setting an exhibition at the National Museum of Singapore, The Straits Times interviewed the past and present police officers, who spoke about several high-profile crimes they managed during their years of career in the police force. One of them, 55-year-old Superintendent Abdul Halim Osman, who was still serving in the force, mentions that the case of Lim Hock Soon's murder as his most memorable of all cases he encountered before. Abdul Halim said to the newspaper that back then, when he was the investigative officer of the case and saw the bullet-riddled corpse of Lim lying in his study room, there was a need for him and his team of CID officers to manage the chaotic situation and crime scene properly to ensure no stone was left unturned, given the distress of the family members and the fact that a serious offence of murder was committed in such a situation where a killer took away a life in front of the witnesses.

In January 2021, The Straits Times published an article that recalled the three most notorious gangsters from Singapore, which included Tan Chor Jin among these three people given his notoreity as the killer of Lim Hock Soon in 2006. The other two were "Singapore Siao" Aw Teck Boon and Ah Kong's founder Roland Tan. Roland Tan was wanted by Singaporean police for the unsolved murder of Lam Cheng Siew at Bras Basah in 1969, and he escaped to the Netherlands, where he founded Ah Kong and dabbled in illegal drug trafficking before he re-settled in Copenhagen, Denmark, where he died due to a heart attack in May 2020. Aw Teck Boon, a triad leader of the 60-member Sio Kun Tong gang, was known for causing the death of a man during a fatal assault involving more than 100 gang members, and had also served detention under the Criminal Law (Temporary Provisions) Act for being an underworld leader. Aw was later killed by an unknown assailant in May 1999, and his funeral was attended by many members of the public and some police officers who paid their respects despite his gangland connections, as some residents remembered his kindness and him helping them getting out of financial trouble. Aw was survived by his then 28-year-old Thai wife and a then four-year-old daughter. The killer(s) of Aw were never found.

== See also ==
- Capital punishment in Singapore
- Arms Offences Act
- Ang Soon Tong
- List of major crimes in Singapore
