= Ah Kong =

1970s to 1990s Eurasian drugs syndicate

- 阿公
- Founded: 1970
- Founders: Tan Tong Meng alias Roland Tan; Kay Check Wee alias Golden Kay; Lim Kheng Lim alias Yow Teh; Wee Ah Tee alias Ah Goo
- Founding location: Singapore
- Years active: 1970s–1990s
- Territory: Based in Amsterdam, Netherlands, and Bangkok, Thailand; Areas of influence – Europe
- Ethnicity: Mainly Singaporean Chinese, with some Malaysian Chinese, Indonesian Chinese, Thai Chinese and Dutch
- Membership (est.): Hundreds
- Criminal activities: Drug trafficking, loansharking, bookmaking, gambling
- Rivals: 14K

Ah Kong (Chinese: 阿公) was an organised crime and drugs syndicate that used to extensively control the European heroin trade in the 1970s to 1990s. Originating from Singapore, it was one of the world's largest drug syndicates, having been mainly based in Amsterdam, Netherlands, and Bangkok, Thailand, where they received their drug supplies. The production of heroin was at an area known as the Golden Triangle formed by Thailand, Laos and Myanmar. Ah Kong was not a triad but a fearsome organized crime gang that was renowned all over Asia and Europe.

Although Ah Kong was based in Amsterdam and Bangkok, it had operations in other major European cities and the Asia-Pacific. Ah Kong, which means "The Company" or short for kongsi in Hokkien, was never that influential in their home country of Singapore despite its founding members being from there, due to the country's strict anti-drug policies and the successful crackdown on secret societies (Note: A colloquial term for organized crime groups.) there. It was also known to have had connections with other Southeast Asian countries such as Thailand and Indonesia, and over the years they had built strong ties with the infamous Penang-based Sio Sam Ong.

Most of the members of Ah Kong were Singaporean Chinese and spoke Hokkien although they were overseas-based. It was formed when several members of See Tong (which means buddies or a group of close friends) killed and seriously injured members of their rival gang in a gang clash, and escaped to the Netherlands. While in the Netherlands, the gang received more members joining them. These new members had military training that was acquired while doing their rigorous National Service (NS) stint in Singapore.

After the assassination of the Ah Kong boss in 1997, they began to lose their influence to the Sin Ma gang based in Rotterdam led by a Singaporean fugitive wanted for first-degree murder with firearm in the 1980s. The last official Ah Kong boss died in March 2010. Roland Tan died in 2020.

== Background ==
=== Singapore ===
Secret societies and gangs were part and parcel of everyday life which the local populace in Singapore had to live with. The gangs' activities, which included extortions, illegal gambling, prostitution, drug dealing, loansharking (illegal moneylending), armed robberies and kidnapping, were a major menace in Singapore, especially in the 1950s to the 1970s. Gang wars that resulted in deaths and serious injuries, even to common bystanders, were a common sight in those days.

In 1954, the Commissioner of Police in Singapore revealed that there were 368 known secret societies in Singapore. The police had kept the records of 20,000 members of secret societies, of which 6,500 were active members. This was out of a population of fewer than two million people then.

To eradicate the secret societies, the Criminal Law (Temporary Provisions) Act was used by the Singapore government whereby suspected criminals could be arrested without evidence or warrant, and detained indefinitely without the detainee ever being charged with a crime or tried in a court of law.

=== Origin ===
On the night of 23 October 1969, Roland Tan aka Hylam-kia – which means "Hainanese Kid" in Hokkien – and about ten of his fellow gang members from See Tong had armed themselves with machetes to attack two members of their rival gang, Pek Kim Leng (White Golden Dragon). The members of See Tong were in two cars and had trailed and cornered the car of their rival gang members at the junction of Bras Basah Road and North Bridge Road. One of the rival gang members, who were also armed, was killed and the other seriously injured during the attack.

The clash had arisen from a previous dispute between See Tong and Pek Kim Leng gang members in a bar. Negotiations held later to settle the dispute broke down. A 'curfew' between the two gangs ensued whereby gang members would attack at the sight of each other.

Roland and many of his fellow gang members were from a Hainanese village at Upper Serangoon, where the community was close-knit and included hardened fugitives and seamen. With the help of See Tong, Roland and some of his 'brothers' managed to escape to Amsterdam. Most of the gang members involved in the attack were arrested and were jailed without trial.

== The Rise of Ah Kong ==
=== Amsterdam ===
Amsterdam, capital and second-largest port city of the Netherlands, already had a thriving Chinese community then. The earlier Chinese immigrations were from the former Dutch colonies of Indonesia and Surinam. This was followed by Hongkongers and smaller numbers of Chinese from Singapore and Malaysia. Many opened restaurants or worked as chefs or restaurant workers. Others were gang members or fugitives.

Back in those days, Holland's relaxed attitude towards drugs not only had created a domestic addiction problem, but also encouraged foreign narcotics merchants, especially the Chinese, to move into the country. Dutch law made it extremely difficult for the police to cope with narcotics traffic. A trafficker must be in physical possession of illegal drugs to be prosecuted. Sting operations and plea bargains are forbidden. Wiretaps cannot be used in direct evidence. Sentences are short and jails are comfortable.

Upon arriving in Amsterdam, Roland and his associates were assisted by Johnny (also known as "Big Johnny"). Johnny was the godson of Roland's mother. He was not a See Tong member but a seaman from Singapore who had resided in the Netherlands. Johnny was a man with many connections.

Roland Tan and his brethren, who had very little money with them, saw how members of Hong Kong's infamous 14K triad were doing a thriving drug trade. Tan partnered with Johnny and they founded Ah Kong but operated under the See Tong flag. After gaining additional members they dropped the See Tong name and flag. Roland and his men operated as the muscles and Johnny imported heroin. With only about 10 members, Ah Kong was a small outfit when compared to other well-established Hong Kong triads like 14K, Wo Shing Wo and Sun Yee On which had hundreds of members at any one time.

Ah Kong members then had firearms but often armed themselves with knives. An incident that marked their arrival to the Dutch underworld was when two members of Ah Kong (Johnny and his lieutenant) went to settle a dispute with the Wo Shing Wo triad in Rotterdam. Johnny's lieutenant severed the rival gang boss's arm with a wakizashi when the latter became hostile and tried to pull out a gun. They escaped but not without a hail of bullets that followed. In another incident, Ah Kong members went to settle a dispute with the 14K at a restaurant in Amsterdam Chinatown. They entered the restaurant and yelled 'Who's 14K?'. A young man stood up and replied he was and they shot him – killing him on the spot. The man who pulled the trigger was a Malaysian Chinese fugitive known as Tony. Although they were small in numbers but their actions had earned them respect and fear; and their reputation helped them to expand their influence.

By 1973, Ah Kong's dealings had grown and they had become a major player in the heroin trade.

=== 14K ===
The man in control of the heroin trade then was the first Chinese Godfather in Europe, Chung Mon aka Unicorn of the 14K. He was a Hakka born in Bao'an (present Shenzhen), China. He was the Chairman of the Overseas Chinese Association in the Netherlands. Not only did Chung Mon do a lot of work for charity and was decorated by the Dutch government, he was connected with the highest level of the Kuomintang government in Taiwan as well. Chung Mon took a 5 percent cut for every drug deal. He was questioned by the police on a number of occasions because of his role in the heroin world, but was released because he had a friend with the police who had some influence. When the Chinese community erupted in a series of gunfights as rival gangs lined up on opposite sides of narrow streets and opened fire on one another with shotguns, the Dutch police went to Chung Mon for help and he gave them a list of most of his competitors.

On 3 March 1975, three men approached Chung Mon as he stepped towards his Mercedes outside his office, and fired ten bullets into the Chinese Godfather. It is believed that the three men, who were never arrested, were sent by Ng Sik-ho aka Limpy Ho, a major Chiuchow/Teochew drug lord in Hong Kong who was a rival of the 14K. (In 1991, a Hong Kong film, To Be Number One, that depicted the life of Limpy Ho was made.)

Within months, the 14K headquarters in Hong Kong sent a 426 Double Flower Red-Pole (high level enforcer) to replace Chung Mon as the new dragon head. His name was Chan Yuen Muk aka Mo Dedong because he struck a resemblance to the Chinese Communist leader, Mao Zedong. Chan was an aggressive and overbearing man who made it clear he wanted to control the drug trade in Amsterdam. Not only the 5% cut of every drug deal was to be increased but all drug deals would have to go through the 14K.

On the anniversary of Chung Mon's death, 3 March 1976, which was seven months after Chan's arrival in Amsterdam, he went to the Yow Lee domino club co-owned by Johnny and his sworn brother, Mo Yong, who was also a 14K member. On that day, Chan won a few million guilders on domino or pai kow from Mo Yong. Mo Yong contacted Johnny who was in Hong Kong at that time and requested a hit because he was unable to pay. Subsequently, Mo Yong told Chan to come back on the following day to collect the cash. After Chan walked out of Yow Lee, he was gunned down along with his bodyguards by the Ah Kong commandos. In no time at all, Ah Kong moved into the areas once controlled by the 14K and stifled the smaller independent dealers, comprising mainly Malaysians, Thais, Indonesians, Dutch, Hongkongers and Europeans. When the small-timers resisted, Ah Kong's actions were swift and brutal. First they resorted to torture, and then murder. Bodies were found on the canals of Amsterdam. From then on, their reputation grew for not only being fearless but also ruthless; and they dominated Holland's heroin empire. Rules were set that whoever imported heroin into the country must hand them over to Ah Kong for distribution and Ah Kong would get a 20% cut, thus controlling the heroin pricing. Ah Kong's activities soon expanded to other European cities and had their men stationed in major cities across Europe.

=== Split ===
Tan, a recalcitrant and habitual gambler, started embezzling the Company's fund. If the accountant would not collaborate with him, he would be replaced. Eventually, Tan's insidious ways were exposed that led to the breaking up between Johnny and him. Johnny went to Bangkok and established the Hainan gang. He continued to export large quantities of heroin into Europe and his interests extended to the US. He was one boss known to be involved in the largest deals. During the 1970s, he imported multi tonnes of heroin into Europe alone. Besides the illicit trade, he owned many legitimate businesses from high-end sex clubs or brothels, restaurants to travel agencies and into financing movie production in Hong Kong where he was famously known to the underworld who had taken out Chan Yuen Muk. The incident did not deter his close relationship with the 14K from which Chan was from. Tan was not yet going to give up on the past; he gave order to his men to take out Johnny. One of Tan's men who was indebted to Johnny's kindness in the past squealed. Johnny came up with an elaborate plan of being 'dead' so that he could carry out his operation with ease.

There was a time Roland was detained by the European authorities and the Singapore police was ready to get him extradited back to Singapore to face a murder charge but it never happened. According to Lionel De Souza, a Singapore private detective who was with the Singapore's Criminal Investigation Department then, he was one of three local police officers on standby to extradite Roland. However, the deal fell through because there was no ground for the European authorities to detain him further.

On 30 August 1976, two Dutchmen were arrested at Bangkok airport when they attempted to smuggle 138 kg of heroin in drums. They received long prison sentences but their boss, Johnny, escaped and returned to Europe.

In 1977, law enforcement agencies from the west were ready to arrest Johnny at Bangkok airport once he touched down. When he left the arrival hall, the law enforcement officers walked up to him and identified themselves but Johnny's men responded with firepower, and a shootout ensued. Johnny managed to escape to Penang, Malaysia. He returned to Amsterdam but was arrested and had 17 murder charges read to him. He was found not guilty due to lack of evidence. On 1 September 1977, Johnny was arrested again and sentenced to 10 years in a Swedish prison. After his release, he affirmed Tan spoke to the authorities and 'fingered' him.

Tan moved to Copenhagen later and permanently resided there. He married a Danish woman and took up Danish citizenship. Although some of his followers had good things to say about him, many had not any. Roland Tan's reputation was anything but honest; and he was one known for ripping off his friends. When a well-respected See Tong member, Michael, visited the Netherlands in the 1970s, Roland ordered one of his men to publicly humiliate the unarmed man. In the 1990s, Tan in turn was openly disrespected and humiliated by Henry, who was the Ah Kong boss then, in front of the associates from Taiwan whom Tan had taken to visit Amsterdam.

=== Organization ===
Ah Kong thrived and grew until early 1978. When the Central Narcotics Bureau (CNB) of Singapore learned about the gang activities in 1977, undercover agents were immediately sent to Amsterdam and other European cities to probe the activities of Ah Kong. After months of investigations, they managed to compile a list of gang suspects and how they worked. Ah Kong members who returned to Singapore on holiday were detained and interrogated. The information gathered was shared with other drug enforcement agencies in Southeast Asia, Europe and the United States.

The Singapore authorities found that the make-up of Ah Kong consist of Singapore gangsters, seamen and fugitives, and there were four key leaders. They were a highly dangerous group of men who had no compunctions about killing to protect The Company's interests. Within itself, the Ah Kong functioned like a close-knit family, demanding uncompromising loyalty from all members. However, Ah Kong was never run along secret societies or triads lines at all. It was well-organized and run efficiently as a business entity with a distinct hierarchy.

Ah Kong had also diversified its business into restaurants, the diamond trade, travel agencies, nightclubs, gambling and buying Kung Fu films cheaply in Hong Kong and making a lot of money screening them in Europe, which also acted as fronts for their illegal business.

Ah Kong members were all well-off from the profits of the drug transactions and spent freely on women, travel, expensive clothes and drinks. As a rule, Ah Kong left its members to their own indulgences. But ironically enough, the only thing it would not tolerate was drug consumption by members.

The Ah Kong members were paid a basic monthly salary starting from 2000 guilders, and had their lodging and food taken care of. All the men, even the lowest ranking, were paid a yearly bonus from a "profit-sharing scheme" with the money from drug deals. Members were also given cars and a petrol allowance for which they had to produce receipts. There was a petty cash system where members could take money out to entertain their friends from Singapore. Each year, the members received about 20000 guilders as "clothing allowance" and Italian designer suits were highly recommended.

Singaporean seamen who worked as couriers in European cities were paid at least $2000 Singapore dollars a month with an additional $1000 Singapore dollars given to send home to their families. Ah Kong members usually accompanied the couriers without them knowing it, to ensure that the heroin reached its destination without any problem. Drug couriers were paid $15000 Singapore dollars per trip and given an all-expenses paid holidays in Europe. This sum, which could buy a house in Singapore in the 1970s, was not easy to resist. With the millions of dollars Ah Kong made, they were able to grow their business very fast. In one operation, they used 70 couriers on a single flight to Amsterdam.

One of the reasons for Ah Kong's success was that they were always one step ahead of the law. When Amsterdam customs officers started checking on all Asian passengers thoroughly, Ah Kong flew its couriers to 'safer' airports in London, Oslo, Copenhagen, Paris and Rome. From these airports, the couriers travelled to Amsterdam or Frankfurt by train or taxi. They avoided airports in Germany and Denmark because these countries used narcotics detector dogs.

In late August 1978, the Central Narcotics Bureau (CNB) of Singapore spearheaded an international operation that resulted in the seizure of about $10 million Singapore dollars' worth of heroin and the arrest of more than 50 members of Ah Kong in Singapore, Amsterdam, Hamburg, Copenhagen, Frankfurt, Kuala Lumpur and Penang. Among those detained were three of its four key leaders, which the authorities named Golden K, Ah Wee and Ah Li but the fourth, Ah Meng (Roland Tan), escaped. The crackdown dealt a decisive blow to Ah Kong.

One of the Ah Kong members who was arrested cooperated with the authorities and provided information of the gang members' whereabouts was gunned down in Thailand after his release.

== The New Generation ==
=== 1980s ===
Till the early 1980s, the leader of Ah Kong was Benson until he was jailed without trial in Singapore. The gang was later led by a new generation leader call Bernard, but better known as Siam-kia, which literally means Siamese Kid in Hokkien. Siam-kia had previously attained a university degree when he was in prison without trial in Singapore. After taking over the leadership of Ah Kong, Siam-kia handpicked a team of elite enforcers and ran the gang in executive style. A casino was opened at Kerkstraat 23 in Amsterdam.

There was an occasion when Siam-kia was disrespected by the 14K boss known as Ngau Si. A clash between the two gangs erupted. Ah Kong members were outnumbered but were already well known for being fearless and for their good fighting abilities as most of them were trained boxers and/or military-trained, and some others were fugitives on the run from death row and had nothing to lose. The members swore that they would rather die gloriously on the streets than to face the gallows and the wrath of the Singapore law. Ah Kong defeated 14K, after which Ngau Si permanently retreated to London, England.

Siam-kia was the most popular amongst all the Ah Kong bosses. Although he was the brain behind Ah Kong, he owed his success to the many capable people he had equipped himself with. Ah Kong became so prosperous that it owned more than a hundred racehorses in Singapore. However, like Roland before him, Siam Kia too succumbed to gambling. He lost heavily on horse racing that led him to embezzle the Company's fund. The underboss of Ah Kong, Dennis aka Nor Du, who was not a former See Tong member, led a coup d'état, and the allegations implicated Siam-kia of embezzlement which led to his exit.

Siam-kia was eventually "deported" to Thailand where he went through difficult times. However, he learned to 'cook' MDMA/ecstasy and began producing them in his home laboratory, and he made a comeback in 1997. He operated in Southeast Asia and supplied ecstasy and ketamine to the Asia-Pacific market. He was also involved in cocaine and cannabis. He did meet obstacles when he expanded his interests to Indonesia when the local kingpin there known as Hong Li, took more than a hundred thousand units of ecstasy from him but did not make payment. Siam-kia openly announced a death contract on Hong Li (Hong Li is still alive living in Canada and has return to Indonesia on several occasions). Siam-kia had also incurred the dislike of some Ah Kong elders because he had betrayed a prominent Ah Kong old-timer, Jack, who had gone into partnership with him. For this reason, when the two men met many years later in Bangkok, Jack smashed a glass onto Siam Kia's head.

In 2000s, Siam-kia has made an enormous windfall from real estate investments in Cambodia and runs a casino there.

=== 1990s ===
After deposing Siam-kia, Dennis ruled the Chinese underworld in the Netherlands with an iron-fist. During this time, he saw the rising popularity of ecstasy and he began to import Piperonylmethylketone (PMK), the raw material used to mass-produce the psychedelic drug for the export markets. He was also involved in other drugs, football bookmaking, loansharking and legitimate businesses as well.

Dennis spoke Dutch, English, Italian and several Chinese languages. All his men and everyone in the Chinese community called him Ah Hia, which means "Big Brother" in Hokkien. He was ruthless to his kind but a heroic figure to the common folk. He instructed his men to avoid attention and to be polite and courteous to the common people; and to make sure that nobody make trouble for the Chinese businesses in the Netherlands. He once gave the order to execute the leader of a mainland Chinese gang who had extorted from Chinese restaurants and gang-raped a female restaurant employee.

During his reign, he recruited many Malaysian Chinese and some local Dutchmen. It was reported in the Singapore press that a hundred men could be flown in from Malaysia if there is a need for any gang clash. The second-in-command, Henry, and third-in-command of Ah Kong were former See Tong members.

Under Dennis' leadership, Ah Kong became more influential. Dennis was well connected and had built a vast pool of contacts from Asia to Europe. He had business dealings with the Italian mafia and Yugoslavian crime syndicate, although many adversaries were created at the same time. When Johnny re-entered the illicit trade, he imported 800 kg of cannabis and handed them over to Dennis for distribution. However, the payment was not made in full. Dennis gave the reason that the quality was not good enough for the agreed price. His claim was made only after he had sold the cannabis not upon receiving the shipment. During a meeting in Bangkok, Dennis insulted Johnny of being lacking in knowledge of dealing in the drug business and they ended with animosities. Dennis had received threats from his enemies and almost every competitor in the business wanted him dead. Therefore, he moved around with no less than 20 heavily armed bodyguards who carried bags packed with submachine guns and grenades, and who communicated with each other with walkie-talkies. He had also tightened security with surveillance cameras on the streets where the Ah Kong casino was located.

Ah Kong members were dressed in Versace and wore diamond-studded gold Rolex watches which became their trademark. However, Dennis chose to dress simply without any luxury accessories. Ah Kong soldiers would patrol the streets, airports and train stations and look out for 'China White' traffickers arriving from Asia and other European cities. If they spot any suspicious character they would check on their passports and search them thoroughly. Anyone caught dealing behind Ah Kong's back would be punished and those who snitched will be awarded a cut from the drug seized.

== Fall of Ah Kong ==
In 1997, Dennis received a call from a female friend asking to meet up. Thinking that he was to meet just a female friend, Dennis went alone and was gunned down inside his car by two submachine gun-wielding men on motorbikes. The killing was headline news on the front of all the major newspapers in the Netherlands. The female friend's family was heavily in debts but a few days before the assassination, the debts were mysteriously cleared. Siam-kia announced that he was the one who had ordered the hit. However, some people from the inner-circle discredited his claim and some said that the leader of the Sin Ma gang - Cha Boh Hai, was the one behind the hit.

It was rumoured that in early 1990 when Cha Boh Hai was just released from France Prison and returned to Netherlands, some Ah Kong senior members feared that he would gain in influence and hence, be a conflict of interest to their businesses. A voting process was taken amongst members of Ah Kong of whether Cha Boh Hai would be put on their "hit list". Cha Boh Hai was a Hainanese, and so was Ronald Tan (Hainanese were known to be close like relatives overseas), therefore Mr Big voted against hitting him. Also voting against the decision was Siam-kia. Upon knowing what had transpired, Cha Boh Hai was grateful to Roland and Siam-kia. He eventually became Siam-kia sworn brother.

Approaching the mid 1990s, while Dennis was the number 1 Chinese Mafia in whole of the Netherlands, Cha Boh Hai was rising up and gaining influence in Rotherham. What the Ah Kong members had feared in 1990 became a reality. Cha Boh Hai led his own gang by the name of Sin Ma (mostly Singaporeans) in Rotherham began recruiting Malaysian Chinese and Chinese fugitives from China. They often clashed with the Tai Hun Zai (Big Circle Gang) from China. Cha Boh Hai was ruthless and ambitious. He didn't want to be the number 2 Chinese Mafia in Netherlands. As the number of his members began to grow bigger, he needed more sources of income to feed his members. Rotherham only had that "small market". Therefore he began to eye and place his interest on Amsterdam.

To be number 1, Dennis had to be taken away. So, a plan was formulated. Also, remembering Siam-kia had ever saved Cha Boh Hai's life when voting against hitting him. Cha Boh Hai wanted to return this favour to Siam-kia to take out Dennis from Ah Kong for ousting and humilating Siam-kia. Thus, Dennis was gunned down in 1997.

Henry, the second-in-command of Ah Kong, was automatically promoted to become the new leader. Henry had risen from the rank of an enforcer and had limited connections. He did not enjoy a good relationship with his peers and had little support from them, thus rendering him rather useless. He was fond of gambling at the casinos and loved to go to karaokes. He did not show much enthusiasm in seeking revenge for his predecessor, Dennis. The Ah Kong based in Thailand, in charge of transporting the drugs to Europe, refused to send shipments as a protest of his leadership. The Company's fund was drained and Ah Kong slowly disbanded.

In 1998, Johnny was released from prison for the second time. He had been framed by a small-time Malaysian heroin trafficker and spent more than four years in a Zurich prison. He returned to the Netherlands and went into new trades: cocaine, crystal meth/ice and ecstasy; and his operations went beyond Europe to as far as the Asia-Pacific. He associated with the Russians and teamed up with his long-time close friend, a semi-retired Dutch kingpin, Hugo Ferrol, who was the ex-boss of a Dutch drug lord, Klaas Bruinsma. Johnny was doing well and he took Henry in when the latter was in difficult times.

In 1999, Johnny was found dead, at the age of 53, in a hotel room in Hong Kong after a huge cocaine shipment was busted. The Hong Kong police concluded that he had committed suicide; and the Hong Kong newspaper reported that he had stabbed himself. The day before Johnny died, he had handed over his possessions and identification documents to a close friend. Rumours were that he was not able to answer for the failed shipment to the people who had entrusted him and death was apparently his only answer.

Henry joined Jack's crew, the Ah Kong old-timer who was on bad terms with Siam-kia, until Jack died of a heart attack.

In 2009, Roland Tan and his Singaporean friend, known as Ah M, who had flown to the Danish capital to celebrate his 61st birthday party, was shot by his own man, a Vietnamese called Nguyen Phi Hung. The attack took place after Tan had closed his popular Restaurant Bali at Kongens Nytorv square, the heart of Copenhagen's shopping district. He was shot in the shoulder but his friend was shot in the chest and was in a critical condition. Danish media reported that about 40 young people turned up at the hospital after the two men were admitted in an apparent show of support.

Danish police have stated that the shooting was over a "personal matter" between the gunman and Tan, and that there was a brief exchange between the two men before the shooting. Roland was described as the most powerful Chinese businessman in Denmark by Danish tabloid, Ekstra Bladet. Tan had previously been questioned by police in connection with several serious crimes, including drug dealing, blackmail and murder, according to Danish news reports.

Roland Tan owned Restaurant Bali, a restaurant serving Indonesian and Singaporean food, and a few other restaurants in Copenhagen. The Danish branch of the Hells Angels biker gang, whose activities revolve around drugs and prostitution, had held parties at the restaurant. He died at age 72 in April 2020 from a heart attack.

Henry returned to Singapore. He had contracted cancer and died in March 2010 at the age of 58. He jumped to his death because he was unable to tolerate the pain of his illness. During Henry's prime, he was a fearsome enforcer respected by many but his last days in Amsterdam was a sad story. He was beaten up by the mainland Chinese gang while he was weak and ailing and had no one by his side. He took the humiliation as he was helpless. He realized it was all over for him and left the city where he once shined. He was the last official Ah Kong boss.

=== Present ===
Although Ah Kong's glory days are over, there are still active Ah Kong members who operate individually or in very small groups and are lying very low. They are scattered all over Europe, Asia, and Australia; and some others have joined other groups.

Over the years, there have been many reports of Ah Kong in the press but not all have been accurate.

== Television ==
Ah Kong was featured in the 1996 Television Corporation of Singapore (now Mediacorp) blockbuster Mandarin television drama series, Brave New World (新阿郎), which starred Hong Kong actor, Alex Man and Fann Wong. The series was filmed in Singapore and the Netherlands.

== See also ==
- Secret societies in Singapore
- Internal Security Act (Singapore)
- Organized crime
