= Sio Sam Ong =

- 小三王
- Founded: c.1940; 86 years ago
- Founding location: Penang, Straits Settlements
- Ethnicity: Hokkien
- Leader: Ong King Ee
- Activities: heroin trafficking, prostitution, scamming, kidnapping, corruption
- Allies: Barisan Nasional
- Rivals: Sio Sam Ong renegades

Sio Sam Ong (Chinese: 小三王), literally meaning "Three Little Kings", or SSO, for short, is a leading Chinese triad in Malaysia; with a strong presence in the north (i.e. Kedah, Perlis). Mainly based in Penang and Selangor. It is widely considered to be one of the most powerful triads in the country. Like their counterparts in Singapore and Taiwan, the Sio Sam Ong mostly consists of the Hokkien ethnic group.

== Background ==
It is believed that Sio Sam Ong was established during the 1940s to 1950s; being mainly active in northern Malaysia. According to the Malaysian police, Sio Sam Ong is currently one of the most active triads after Aek En Sang, Ang Soon Toong, Salakau Singapore, Ghee Heng, Ang Bin Hoay and Chaun San in Malaysia. it is believed that they have around 500,000 members and involved in 100 countries. In Malaysia, they were actively involved in politics by joining the government coalition (Barisan Nasional) parties United Malays National Organisation (UMNO) and the Malaysian Chinese Association (MCA) to cover up their identity. They use the code of 3821 gang, and 36 international brothers/ red international army according to the hoax of Chinese triads history. The gang was formerly headed by Bull Head, Ong King Ee, nicknamed "Jackie Chan".

According to Penang police, the triad has been involved in international drug trafficking, kidnapping, murder, extortion, racketeering and loansharking at its height.

Sio Sam Ong members were also suspected of involvement in at least 10 murders in the Penang in the late 1980s and early 1990s, including a notorious massacre at pre-wedding celebration in the Sungai Petani district of Kedah in September 1992, where six people were shot to death. In December of the same year, five skeletal remains with their hands tied behind their backs, believed to be Sio Sam Ong members who betrayed the gang, were exhumed from unmarked graves in Mount Erskine, Penang. Many of its high-ranking members are still high on the Malaysian Police wanted list.
