= Criminal Law (Temporary Provisions) Act =

Statute of the Parliament of Singapore

Criminal Law (Temporary Provisions) Act 1955
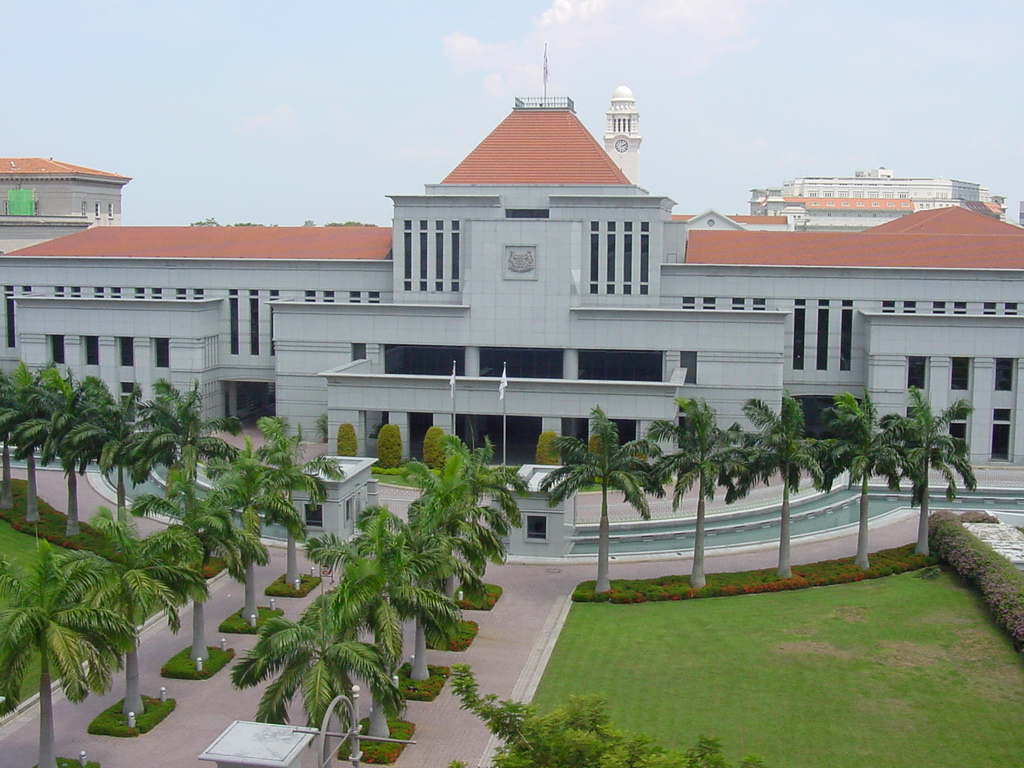

Parliament of Singapore
- Long title: An Act to make temporary provisions for the maintenance of public order, the control of supplies by sea to Singapore, and the prevention of strikes and lock-outs in essential services.
- Citation: Ordinance No. 26 of 1955, now Criminal Law (Temporary Provisions) Act 1955 (2020 Revised Edition)
- Enacted by: Legislative Assembly of Singapore
- Enacted: 22 September 1955
- Commenced: 21 October 1955

Legislative history
- Introduced by: Chief Secretary William Allmond Codrington Goode
- Introduced: 31 August 1955
- First reading: 18 August 1955
- Second reading: 22 September 1955
- Third reading: 22 September 1955
- Status: In force

The Criminal Law (Temporary Provisions) Act 1955 (often known by the abbreviation "CLTPA") is a Singapore statute that, among other things, allows the executive branch of the Government of Singapore to order that suspected criminals be detained without trial. It was introduced in 1955 during the colonial era and intended to be a temporary measure, but has since been renewed continuously; the Government has declined to make it permanent, claiming it "believe[s] that the Act should be explicitly extended by Parliament every five years". The validity of the Act was most recently extended in April 2024, and it will remain in force till October 2029.

According to the Government, the Act is only used as a last resort when a serious crime has been committed and a court prosecution is not possible because witnesses are unwilling or afraid to testify in court. The Act is used largely in cases relating to secret societies, drug trafficking and loansharking; in 2016, out of a total of 109 detainees, 91 were detained for secret society activities, 12 for unlicensed moneylending and 5 for drug trafficking.

Part V of the Act provides that whenever the Minister for Home Affairs is satisfied that a person, whether at large or in custody, "has been associated with activities of a criminal nature", the Minister may order that the person be detained for any period not exceeding 12 months if he is satisfied that such detention is necessary "in the interests of public safety, peace and good order"; or order that the person be subject to police supervision for any period not exceeding three years. Such "activities of a criminal nature" include secret society involvement, gang activities, drug trafficking, unlicensed moneylending, human trafficking, robbery with firearms, murder, gang rape, kidnapping, and any organised crime activity as defined in section 48(1) of the Organised Crime Act.

Within 28 days of a detention order being made, the Minister must refer the order and a statement of the grounds upon which the order was made to an advisory committee; such advisory committees are, since March 2018, chaired by sitting Judges of the Supreme Court. The advisory committee must submit a written report on the making of the order, with recommendations as it thinks fit, to the President of Singapore, who may cancel or confirm the order. The President may, from time to time, extend the validity of any detention order for periods not exceeding 12 months at any one time, and may at any time refer any such orders for further consideration by an advisory committee. Between 2008 and 2012, the average number of detention orders issued each year was 43, and as of 31 October 2013 there were 209 people detained under the CLTPA; this had fallen to 109 in 2016.

Part II of the Act contains criminal offences designed to prevent supplies from falling into the hands of persons who intend or are about to act or have recently acted in a manner prejudicial to public safety or the maintenance of public order in Singapore, and the creation or possession of subversive documents. Part III prohibits strikes and lock-outs in the electricity, gas and water service industries. It also renders illegal such actions taken in respect of other essential services unless 14 days' notice has been given, or during the course of proceedings taken to resolve trade disputes. Part IV contains various general provisions, including provisions empowering the police to disperse assemblies; carry out searches; and take photographs, finger impressions and body samples from persons arrested, detained or subject to police supervision.

== History ==
The first version of the Criminal Law (Temporary Provisions) Act ("CLTPA") was enacted as the Criminal Law (Temporary Provisions) Ordinance 1955, when Singapore was a Crown colony of the British Empire. Notable portions of the Ordinance included Part III which aimed to control the movement of persons and vessels in the Straits of Johor, and was intended to assist the Federation of Malaya in denying supplies to Communist terrorists in the jungles of Johor. Part V made it necessary to give 14 days' notice of a strike or lock-out in an essential service to enable emergency arrangements to be made for ensuring a minimum service necessary for the well-being of the public. The Ordinance required renewal after three years.

In August 1958, the Ordinance was amended to provide for the preventive detention without trial of persons associated with criminal activities for up to six months. During the Second Reading of the Amendment Bill, the Chief Secretary of the Legislative Assembly of Singapore, Edgeworth Beresford David, said that such powers were needed to combat gang fights or other crimes committed by secret society members, particularly violent conflict between such societies. He noted that while in 1954 there had been 30 secret society gang fights, by 1957 the number had risen to 150, and in the first six months of 1958 there had already been 157 fights – double the rate for the previous year. Such fights were difficult for the police to detect and to prosecute, as eyewitnesses were too frightened of reprisals to furnish information leading to the arrests of gang members. He said:

It is in these circumstances that the Government has decided that more drastic steps must be taken to protect the public from the activities of these gangs, and that since, for the reasons I have given, it is not possible to achieve that protection through the normal judicial processes of the Courts, these safeguards, which are adequate in ordinary times, must, in the present abnormal crime-wave, be supplemented by executive action. It is not only the duty of the Government to do this in discharge of its primary responsibility for the maintenance of peace and good order, but I believe that there is a wide public demand that such action should be taken and that it will meet with wholehearted support from all law-abiding members of the community.

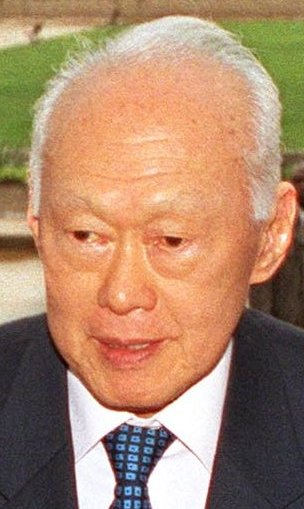
Lee Kuan Yew, Prime Minister of Singapore 1959–1990, supported the introduction of detention without trial under the statute in August 1958

The Chief Secretary emphasized that the powers to detain without trial were not intended to be used indiscriminately. Rather, they were designed to deal with ringleaders of gangs and those primarily responsible for their activities, to break the organizations of gangs and prevent their leaders from coercing less vicious members of their gangs as well as the general public. Further, the Government was introducing the powers as a temporary measure to meet an immediate threat, and they would not be retained as soon as the circumstances were such that the threat no longer existed. The Amendment Bill was supported by Lee Kuan Yew, then Member of Parliament for Tanjong Pagar, who said:

Let us face the facts: either we bring these gangsters to trial, or we do nothing, or we lock them up without trial. Well, we prefer to bring them to trial if we could. As I know, and I think every practising lawyer in town knows, the point is now reached when police officers frankly admit that gangsters are not scared of the police any more. ... Now quite frankly either you surrender and say, well, the judicial process is inadequate and therefore we have been beaten by gangsters, or we say, well what do we do about it? I say, well, if there is no other way, then we had better deal with them firmly.

After Singapore became a self-governing state within the British Empire, in September 1959 the Ordinance was amended again to extend the period of detention from six to 12 months, to give the Minister for Home Affairs the power to place persons associated with criminal activities under police supervision as an alternative to detention, and to impose special restrictions on persons under police supervision and special penalties on them for breaking the restrictions or being convicted of specified offences. The Ordinance, which was due to expire in October of that year, was also extended for a five-year period. From that time, the Act has been extended every five years, remaining on the statute books after Singapore's full independence in 1965. The statute has been renewed 15 times since 1955, most recently on 20 October 2024, and is presently in force till 20 October 2029.

In 1998, Lee Kuan Yew, who by then had served as Prime Minister for over 40 years between 1959 and 1990 and was Senior Minister of Singapore at the time, reiterated his support for the law:

It must be realised that if you abolish the powers of arrest and detention and insist on trial in open court in accordance with the strict laws of evidence of a criminal trial, then law and order becomes without the slightest exaggeration utterly impossible, because whilst you may still nominally have law and order, the wherewithal to enforce it would have disappeared. The choice in many of these cases is either to go through the motions of a trial and let a guilty man off to continue his damage to society or to keep him confined without trial.

The CLTPA was termed "draconian legislation" in a 2004 article by the Asian Centre for Human Rights, and in its 2006 manifesto the Workers' Party of Singapore called for the Act to be re-examined to determine whether it is still necessary in today's context; the party also voted against its renewal in 2018. It has also been suggested by an academic that the power to detain without trial in the Act is unconstitutional as it is not authorized by Articles 149 and 150 of the Constitution of Singapore and is outside the common law legislative power of Parliament.

== Content ==
The long title of the Act states that it is "[a]n Act to make temporary provisions for the maintenance of public order, the control of supplies by sea to Singapore, and the prevention of strikes and lock-outs in essential services". The Act is divided into five parts. The first part, entitled "Preliminary", specifies the short title of the Act and contains a definition section. It also contains section 1(2), a sunset provision which reads: "This Act shall continue in force for a period of 5 years" from a specified date, currently 21 October 2029. This provision is amended each time the validity of the Act is extended. The other parts of the Act deal with the matters described below.

=== Miscellaneous offences relating to public safety ===
==== Supplies ====
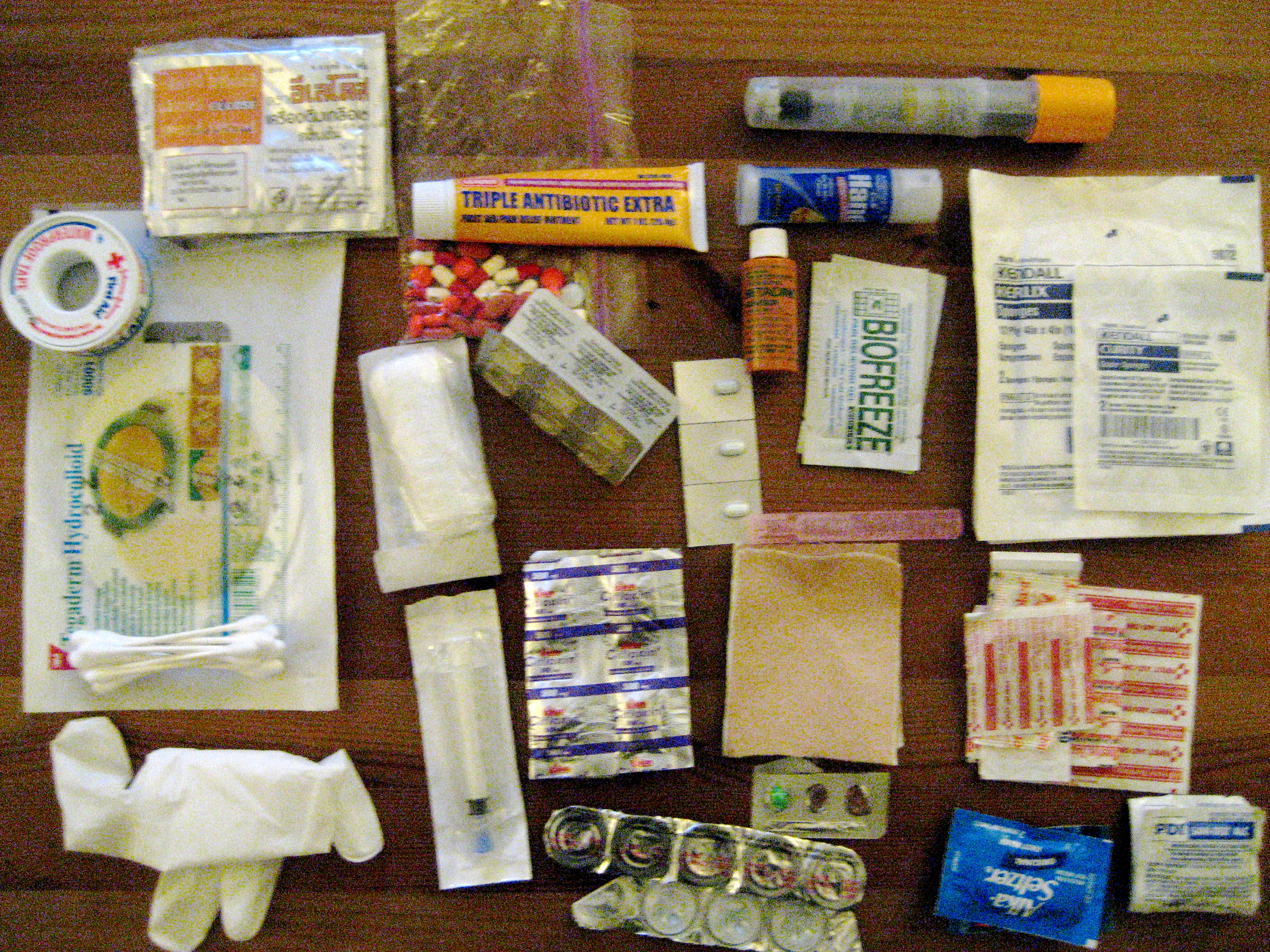
Under the Criminal Law (Temporary Provisions) Act, it is an offence, among other things, to demand, collect or receive supplies – such as these medical supplies – from any person when it may be reasonably presumed that that person intends to act in a manner prejudicial to public safety in Singapore.

Part II of the CLTPA creates miscellaneous offences relating to public safety. Under section 3(1), it is an offence to demand, collect or receive any supplies from any other person in circumstances which raise a reasonable presumption that:

- he intends or is about to act or has recently acted in a manner prejudicial to public safety in Singapore or the maintenance of public order therein; or
- the supplies so demanded, collected or received are intended for the use of any person who the first-mentioned person knows or has reason to believe intends, or is about, so to act, or has recently so acted.

The term supplies is defined in section 2 as including money, food, drink, clothing, rubber, tin or other valuable commodity, any medicine or drug or other medical supplies, and any material or instrument or part thereof for printing, typewriting or duplicating words or objects in visible form. The penalty for the offence is imprisonment for a term not exceeding 10 years.

Section 3(2) provides that any person who is found in possession of any supplies for which he cannot satisfactorily account in circumstances which raise a reasonable presumption that the supplies are intended for the use of any person who that first-mentioned person knows or has reason to believe intends, or is about, to act, or has recently acted, in a manner prejudicial to public safety in Singapore or the maintenance of public order therein, is guilty of an offence and is liable on conviction to imprisonment for a term not exceeding seven years.

It is an offence under section 3(3) for any person to provide, directly or indirectly, any supplies to any other person in circumstances which raise a reasonable presumption that the first-mentioned person knows or has reason to believe that other person intends, or is about, to act, or has recently acted, in a manner prejudicial to public safety in Singapore or the maintenance of public order therein, or that the supplies so provided are intended for the use of any person who intends, or is about, so to act, or has recently so acted. On conviction, a person is liable to imprisonment for a term not exceeding seven years. However, a person will not be convicted of an offence under section 3(3) if he proves that prior to being charged with or accused of that offence by a police officer or a person in authority he voluntarily gave full information of the offence to a police officer.

==== Subversive documents ====
It is a criminal offence carrying a maximum penalty of ten years' imprisonment to make, cause to be made, carry or have in one's possession or under one's control any subversive document without lawful excuse. A subversive document is any document which contains:

- any subversive matter;
- any propaganda or matter supporting, propagating or advocating acts prejudicial to the public safety in Singapore, or the maintenance of public order therein, or inciting to violence therein, or counselling disobedience to the law of Singapore or to any lawful order therein; or
- any reference to or account of any collection of, or any request or demand for, any subscription, contribution or donation, whether in money or in kind, or any request or demand for supplies for the benefit, directly or indirectly, or the use of persons who intend to or are about to act or have acted in a manner prejudicial to the public safety in Singapore or to the maintenance of public order therein or who incite to violence therein or counsel disobedience to the law thereof or any lawful order therein,

and includes any document indicating a connection, association or affiliation with any unlawful society. The Act creates rebuttable presumptions that every document purporting to be a subversive document is of that nature until the contrary is proved; and that a person who made, was carrying or had in his possession or under his control a subversive document is deemed to have known the nature and contents of the document. The accused person has the burden of proving that he was unaware of the nature or contents of the subversive document that he made, caused to be made, was carrying or had in his possession or under his control; and that he made, caused to be made, was carrying or had the subversive document in his possession or under his control in such circumstances that at no time did he have reasonable cause to believe or suspect that the document was a subversive document.

=== Illegal strikes and lock-outs in essential services ===
Part III of the CLPTA deals with illegal strikes and lock-outs in essential services. Section 5 of the Act defines a strike as "the cessation of work by a body of persons employed in any essential service acting in combination, or a concerted refusal or a refusal under a common understanding of a number of persons who are or who have been so employed to continue to work or to accept employment", and a lock-out as "the closing of a place of employment or the suspension of work, or the refusal by an employer to continue to employ any number of persons employed by him in consequence of a trade dispute, done with a view to compelling those persons, or to aid another employer in compelling persons employed by him, to accept terms or conditions of or affecting employment". Essential services are any services, businesses, trades, undertakings, manufactures or callings included in Part I of the First Schedule to the Act, namely:

1. Banking services, including services relating to transactions in securities and futures contracts.
2. Broadcasting services.
3. Bulk distribution of fuel and lubricants.
4. Civil defence services provided by the Singapore Civil Defence Force.
5. Clearing and settlement services relating to transactions in securities and futures contracts and transactions in the banking system.
6. Drug enforcement services provided by the Central Narcotics Bureau.
7. Electricity and gas services.
8. Fire services, including rescue and fire-fighting services provided by the Civil Aviation Authority of Singapore.
9. Information services and undertakings provided by the Ministry of Information, Communications and the Arts and its agencies.
10. Information technology services to support the processing of applications for permits for the import, export and transshipment of goods.
11. Newspaper services.
12. Pollution control and environmental monitoring and assessment services provided by the National Environment Agency.
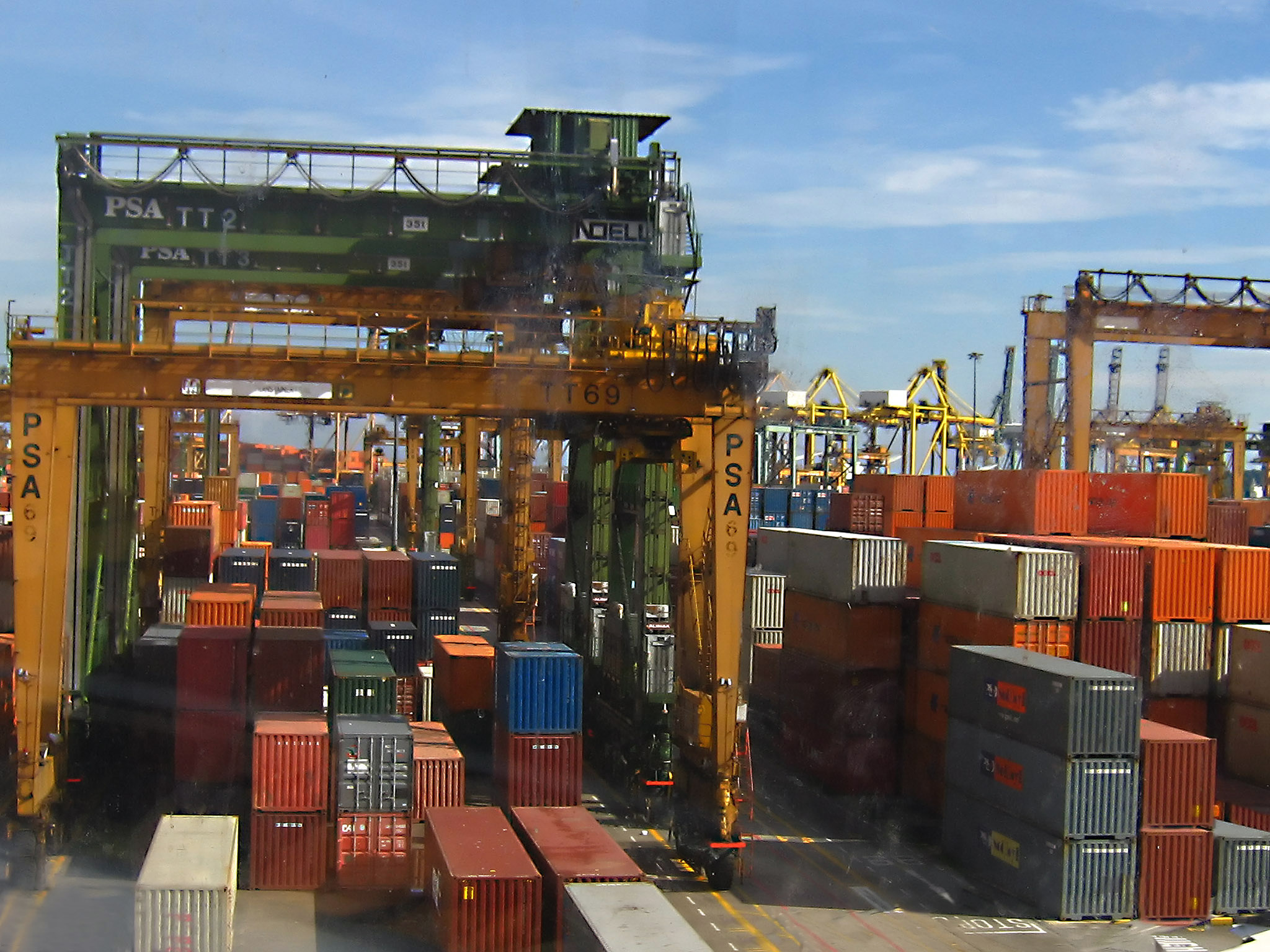
  The container storage and holding area of PSA International's Keppel Terminal, photographed in May 2006. Such port services are essential services within the meaning of the Criminal Law (Temporary Provisions) Act.
13. Port, dock and harbour services and undertakings including services relating to the tracking and safe navigation of vessels in the territorial waters of Singapore and marine services and facilities and port services and facilities as defined in the Maritime and Port Authority of Singapore Act (Cap. 170A).
14. Postal and telecommunication services and undertakings.
15. Prison services.
16. Private and public health services, including services relating to the collection of blood for the use of hospitals and the pharmaceutical services.
17. Public transport and air transport services, including ground handling services.
18. Refuse or waste collection services provided by any public waste collector licensee licensed under the Environmental Public Health Act (Cap. 95).
19. Services provided by the Air Traffic Controllers and the Operations and Licensing Assistants of the Civil Aviation Authority of Singapore.
20. Services provided by the Immigration and Checkpoints Authority.
21. Services relating to dealings in securities, trading in futures contracts and leveraged foreign exchange trading provided by the holder of a capital markets services licence under the Securities and Futures Act (Cap. 289).
22. Sewerage and waste water treatment services.
23. Veterinary public health services provided by the Agri-Food and Veterinary Authority, including the inspection of primary food (meat and meat product, fish and fish product, egg, raw milk, fruit and vegetable) at the point of import and before distribution to retail.
24. Water reclamation services.
25. Water services.
26. Weather information provided by the Meteorological Services Division of the National Environment Agency.
27. The following undertakings performed for the Singapore Armed Forces:
  - the construction, maintenance and repair of military installations;
  - the design, development, production, manufacture, supply, transport, delivery, repair and maintenance of weapon systems (including military aircraft, ships, submarines and vehicles, arms, explosives, computer hardware and software and other military equipment) and spares and components thereof;
  - the land, air and sea transportation of military personnel and equipment;
  - the management and operation of warehouses, military retail outlets, storehouses, ferry terminals, cookhouses and camp complexes;
  - the security functions performed at military installations or buildings;
  - the supply, transport and delivery of military supplies, including rations and construction materials; and
  - the surveillance, testing and disposal of ammunition.
28. All undertakings of whatever nature of —
  - a securities exchange, a futures exchange, a clearing house or an exchange holding company approved under the Securities and Futures Act (Cap. 289);
  - Singapore Customs;
  - SNP SPrint Pte. Ltd.;
  - the CISCO Recall Total Information Management Pte. Ltd.;
  - the Monetary Authority of Singapore in managing the Singapore dollar exchange rate; and
  - the Monetary Authority of Singapore under the Currency Act (Cap. 69).

Workmen employed in electricity, gas and water services may not go on strike at all, and employers are not permitted to lock out workmen engaged in those services. Workmen employed in other essential services shall not go on strike, and employers of such workmen shall not lock them out:

- unless at least 14 days before striking or locking out notice of intention to strike or lock out has been given;
- before the date of striking or locking out specified in the notice; or
- during the pendency of any proceedings, that is, conciliation proceedings directed by the Commissioner for Labour under s. 20(2) of the Industrial Relations Act (Cap. 136) or by the Minister for Manpower under s. 22(1) of that Act; proceedings before an Industrial Arbitration Court in respect of a trade dispute of which that Court has cognizance by virtue of s. 31 of the Industrial Relations Act; or proceedings before a board of inquiry appointed by the Minister under s. 74(1) of the Industrial Relations Act.

A strike or lock-out is deemed to be illegal if it is commenced, declared or continued in contravention of the above provisions or any provision of any other written law, although a lock-out declared in consequence of an illegal strike or a strike declared in consequence of an illegal lock-out is not illegal. It is an offence for any workman and any employer to commence, continue or otherwise act in furtherance of an illegal strike or lock-out; the penalty is a fine not exceeding S$2,000 or imprisonment not exceeding 12 months or both. It is also an offence to instigate or incite others to take part in, or otherwise act in furtherance of, an illegal strike or lock-out; and to give financial aid to illegal strikes or lock-outs.

No person refusing to take part or to continue to take part in any illegal strike or lock-out is subject to expulsion from any trade union or society, or to any fine or penalty, or to the deprivation of any right or benefit to which he or his legal personal representatives would otherwise be entitled. He is also not liable to be placed in any respect, directly or indirectly, under any disability or at any disadvantage as compared with other members of the union or society, even if the rules of the trade union or society to which he belongs state otherwise.

On 26 November 2012, 102 drivers from China employed by SMRT Buses refused to report to work, citing dissatisfaction with being paid less than their Malaysian and Singaporean counterparts and unhappiness with their living conditions. The following day, about 60 drivers again refused to work. The drivers returned to work on 28 November. Subsequently, five drivers alleged to have instigated their colleagues to participate in the illegal strike were charged under the CLTPA. On 3 December, one of the drivers pleaded guilty and was sentenced to six weeks' imprisonment. The other four drivers claimed trial, but eventually pleaded guilty on 25 February 2013. Senior District Judge See Kee Oon imposed deterrent sentences on them "to ensure that others are not emboldened towards attempting similar displays of disaffection over employment terms or conditions". He held that one aggravating factor was that the four drivers had planned the strike "ostensibly with the purpose of putting pressure on SMRT to accommodate their demands, but with the clear consciousness that it would cause disruption and inconvenience in the provision of transport services. This had the potential to severely affect the daily lives of all commuters who rely on public transport." One driver who admitted to two charges of conspiring and inciting other drivers to participate in the strike was sentenced to seven weeks' jail, while the other three were each sentenced to six weeks' jail on one charge of conspiring to instigate the other drivers. Twenty-nine other "active participants" in the strike were repatriated to China in December 2012.

=== Detention and police supervision ===
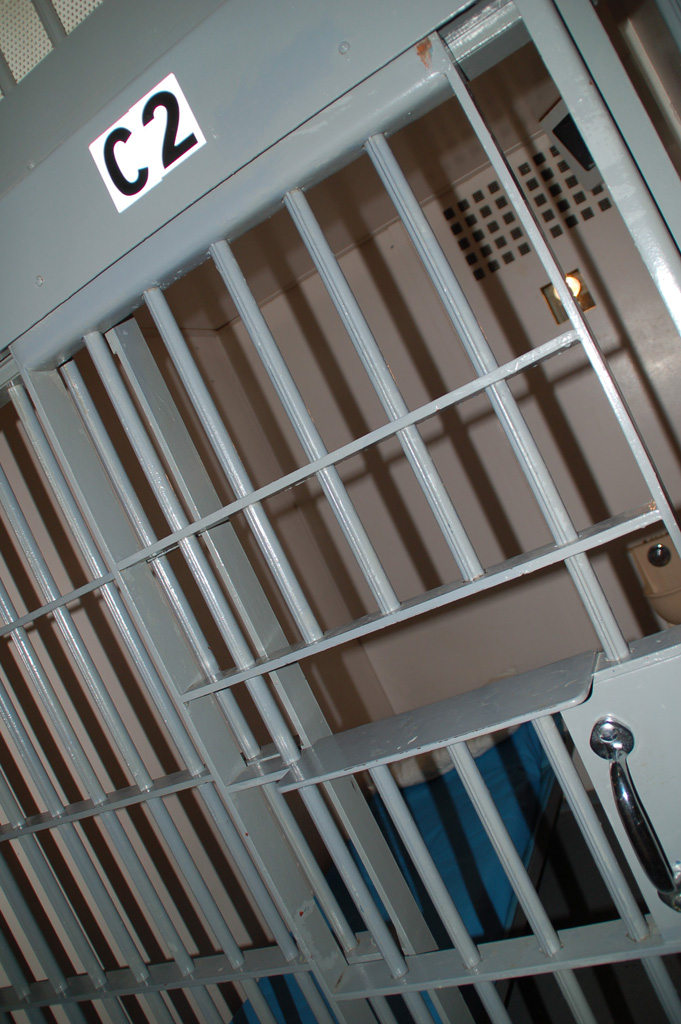
The door of a prison cell

It is convenient to first describe Part V of the CLTPA, which deals with detention of persons without trial and the supervision of persons by the police. (Part IV contains various general provisions, and is discussed below.)

Whenever the Minister for Home Affairs is satisfied that a person, whether at large or in custody, has been associated with activities of a criminal nature, the Minister may, with the consent of the Public Prosecutor:

- order that the person be detained for any period not exceeding 12 months, if he is satisfied that it is necessary for the person to be detained in the interests of public safety, peace and good order; or
- order that the person be subject to police supervision for any period not exceeding three years if he is satisfied that this is necessary.

In the 1993 case of Kamal Jit Singh v. Minister for Home Affairs, the Court of Appeal of Singapore stated that validity of detention is not dependent on the subjective satisfaction of the authorities. Therefore, a court is entitled to determine whether there are objective grounds for the Minister's satisfaction that a person has been associated with criminal activities and that his or her detention is necessary. On the other hand, it was held by the High Court in Re Wong Sin Yee that the judicial process is unsuitable for reaching decisions on questions of public safety, peace and good order. Therefore, the court will not quash the Minister's decision to detain a person unless it is so outrageous in its defiance of accepted moral standards that no sensible person who had applied his mind to the question to be decided could have arrived at it.

==== Detention ====
===== Preventive detention by the Minister =====
A person may be detained for criminal activities occurring either within or outside Singapore. While the Minister for Home Affairs must be satisfied that a detention order is required in the interests of public safety, peace and good order in Singapore, it does not follow that the threat to public safety, peace and good order must result from criminal activities in Singapore; however, in the 2015 case of Tan Seet Eng v Attorney-General and another matter, the Court of Appeal ruled the detention of alleged match-fixer Dan Tan unlawful as "there [was] nothing to suggest whether (or how) [his] activities could be thought to have a bearing on the public safety, peace and good order within Singapore", and thus "the Appellant's detention was unlawful because it was beyond the scope of the power vested in the Minister".

Within 28 days of a detention order being made, the Minister must refer the order and a statement of the grounds upon which the order was made to an advisory committee. Since March 2018, these committees have been chaired by sitting Judges of the Supreme Court. Neither the Minister nor any other public servant is required to disclose facts which he considers to be against the public interest to disclose. The advisory committee must submit a written report on the making of the order, with recommendations as it thinks fit, to the President of Singapore, who may cancel or confirm the order.

The President may, from time to time, extend the validity of any detention order for periods not exceeding 12 months at any one time, and may at any time refer any such orders for further consideration by an advisory committee.

On the recommendation of an advisory committee, the Minister may direct that a detainee be released from day to day to engage in employment, including self-employment. A detainee may also be granted leave subject to such conditions and restrictions as the Minister thinks fit. Any detainee who has been permitted to engage in employment or is granted leave who remains at large without lawful excuse or fails to return to his place of detention after the direction or leave has been revoked is deemed to be unlawfully at large and to have escaped from lawful custody.

As detention under the CLTPA does not put a detainee in jeopardy of possible trial and punishment for an alleged offence, the detention is, in this narrow sense, not a criminal cause or matter. Therefore, if a detainee wishes to challenge the legality of his detention, he must apply for an order for review of detention (formerly known as a writ of habeas corpus) under the civil procedure of the Supreme Court. However, it is not within the court's province to determine that a detainee should be charged and tried in open court rather than be detained.

In 1967, there were 620 people detained and 720 people subject to police supervision under the Act. On 9 February 2009, in a written answer to a Parliamentary question by Nominated Member of Parliament Siew Kum Hong, the Deputy Prime Minister and Minister for Home Affairs Wong Kan Seng stated that 366 persons were detained and 272 released under the Act between 2004 and 2008. The Act was only used "as a last resort when a serious crime has been committed and a court prosecution is not possible because witnesses are not willing or afraid to testify in court. Most cases dealt with under the Act are related to secret societies, drug trafficking or loansharking." During a Parliamentary debate on the extension of the Act's validity on 13 February, the Senior Minister of State for Law and Home Affairs, Associate Professor Ho Peng Kee, said that since 1999 the number of detention orders issued under the Act each year, about 60 to 80, had remained "relatively low". He denied the Act created a Guantánamo Bay situation – "The detainees are not kept in a special detention centre, so it cannot be a Guantanamo" – and added that detainees are held with other prisoners "according to the security risks and rehabilitation needs".

Between 2008 and 2012, the average number of detention orders issued each year was 43. As of 31 October 2013, there were 209 people detained under the CLTPA, two-thirds for gang-related activity, a quarter for unlicensed moneylending, and the remainder for drug trafficking and other syndicated crimes.

===== Police powers of arrest and detention =====
Any police officer may, without warrant, arrest and detain pending enquiries any person in respect of whom he has reason to believe there are grounds which would justify the person's detention. In the 1960 case of Re Ong Yew Teck, the High Court held that since a police officer ordering an arrest is not required to disclose facts which he considers to be against the public interest to disclose, it is futile for a court to objectively decide whether there are grounds justifying detention. Therefore, a subjective test is to be applied – if the police officer honestly supposes he has reason to believe the required element, the court cannot go behind the officer's statement. However, Ong Yew Teck may no longer be good law in view of the Court of Appeal's more recent decision in Kamal Jit Singh (above).

No person may be detained for enquiries for more than 24 hours unless such detention is authorized by a police officer of or above the rank of assistant superintendent, or for 48 hours in all. Such a police officer may, if satisfied that the enquiries cannot be completed within 48 hours, authorize the further detention of the person for an additional period not exceeding 14 days. In contrast, under Article 9(3) of the Constitution of Singapore, a person who is arrested must be informed as soon as may be of the grounds of his arrest and be allowed to consult and be defended by a legal practitioner of his choice. In addition, Article 9(4) states that he must without unreasonable delay, and in any case within 48 hours (excluding the time of any necessary journey), be produced before a magistrate and shall not be further detained in custody without the magistrate's authority. However, the Constitution specifically provides that no law inconsistent with those provisions which was in force before the commencement of the Constitution and which authorizes the arrest and detention of any person in the interests of public safety, peace and good order is invalidated by these Articles. No illegality in the detention by the police renders a detention order made subsequently by the Minister unlawful. When a detention order has been made against a person, any police officer may, without warrant, arrest that person and is required to forthwith report the arrest to the Commissioner of Police. A person thus arrested is deemed to be in lawful custody and may be detained for not more than 48 hours in any prison or police station pending the instructions by the Minister for his further detention.

Notwithstanding anything to the contrary in any written law, it is lawful for any police officer of or above the rank of assistant superintendent, or a police officer of any rank specially authorized by a police officer of or above the rank of assistant superintendent, to effect the arrest of any person in pursuance of the provisions of Part V of the Act, to enter and search any place. To effect an entrance into that place, a police officer may break open any outer or inner door or window of that place if he cannot otherwise obtain admittance.

The powers conferred upon a police officer to arrest and detain persons pending enquiries, to arrest persons against whom detention orders have been made, and to enter and search premises may be exercised by an officer of the Central Narcotics Bureau.

==== Police supervision ====
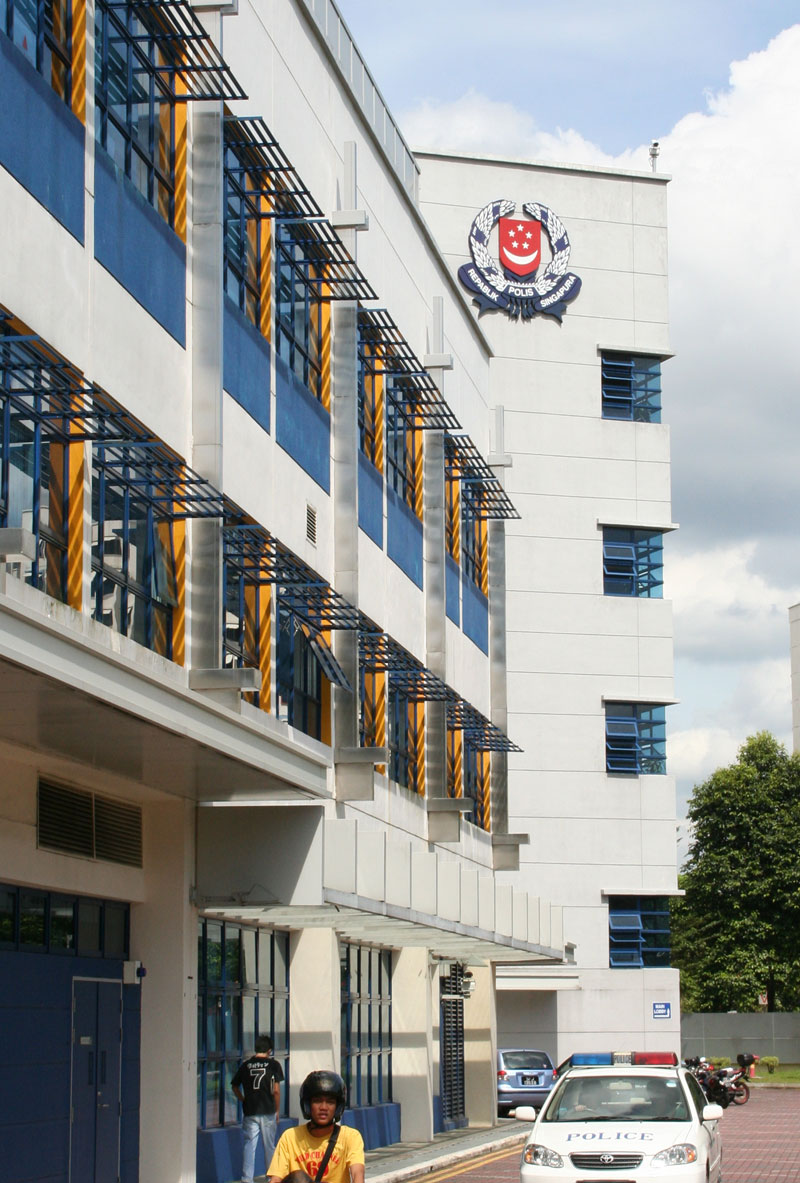
The headquarters of the Jurong Police Division. A person subject to supervision is obliged, among other things, to present himself to the officer in charge of the police division in which he lives to notify him of any change of residence.

After a detention order has been made or after its expiry, the Minister may direct that the person be subject to police supervision for a period not exceeding three years. The making of a police supervision order cancels any detention order in force. Supervision orders must also be referred to an advisory committee and reviewed by the President.

A person subject to supervision is subject to the following:

- The obligations imposed upon persons subject to police supervision under section 14 of the Criminal Procedure Code (Cap. 68, 1985 Rev. Ed.), that is, he must comply with these requirements:
  - He must personally present himself and notify the place of his residence to the officer in charge of the police division in which his residence is situated. Whenever he changes his residence within the same police division, he must personally present himself and notify the change of residence to the officer in charge of that police division, and whenever he changes his residence within Singapore from one police division to another, he must personally present himself and notify such change of the residence to the officer in charge of the police division which he is leaving and to the officer in charge of the police division into which he goes to reside.
  - Whenever he changes his residence to a place outside Singapore, he must personally present himself and notify the change of residence and the place to which he is going to reside to the officer in charge of the police division which he is leaving. If, having changed his residence to a place outside Singapore, he subsequently returns to Singapore, he must personally present himself and notify his return and his place of residence in Singapore to the officer in charge of the police division in which his residence is situated.
  - If he intends to be absent from his last notified residence for more than 48 hours without changing his place of residence, he must personally present himself and notify his intention, the place to which he intends to go and the period of his intended absence to the officer in charge of the police division in which his residence is situated.
  - He must report himself at such time and place and to such police officer as may be appointed by the Commissioner of Police at intervals not exceeding 30 days. During such reportings, his fingerprints must be taken.
- He is also subject to all or any of the following restrictions as the Minister may by order direct:
  - He may be required to reside within the limits of any police division specified in the order.
  - He may not be permitted to change his residence without the written authority of a police officer not below the rank of inspector.
  - He may be restrained from leaving Singapore without the written authority of a police officer not below the rank of inspector, except in so far as the order otherwise provides.
  - He may be required to keep the commander of the police division in which he resides notified at all times of the house or place in which he resides.
  - He may be liable, at such times specified in the order, to present himself at the nearest police station.
  - He may be required to remain indoors or within an area defined in the order, between certain specified hours, unless he obtains special permission to the contrary from the commander of the police division in which he resides.
  - He may not be permitted to enter any area specified in the order, except in so far as the order otherwise provides.

A person subject to supervision who contravenes or fails to comply with any order or restriction imposed on him is guilty of an offence and is liable on conviction to imprisonment for not less than one year and not more than three years. As the restrictions are absolute, a person need not possess any mens rea (fault element) to have committed an offence.

It is also an offence for a person subject to supervision to:

- consort or habitually associate with another person subject to supervision without the permission of the commander of the police division in which he resides, unless he proves that he did not know and had no reason to suspect that the other person was a person subject to supervision;
- be found in the company of two or more persons subject to supervision, and be unable to satisfactorily account for his presence;
- frequent or loiter in any public place or in the neighbourhood of any place of public entertainment between the hours of sunset and sunrise, and be unable to satisfactorily account for his presence.
- be found in or near any place in which any act of violence or breach of the peace is being or has just been committed, and be unable to satisfactorily account for his presence.

The penalty is imprisonment for not less than one year and not more than three years.

A person subject to supervision who is convicted of an offence committed after the date of the supervision order under the provisions of any law specified in the Third Schedule to the Act is liable to be imprisoned for twice as long as the maximum term for which he would otherwise have been liable, and also to be caned, notwithstanding any other written law to the contrary.

The President may, from time to time, extend the period of a person's police supervision, and may at any time refer any such orders for further consideration by an advisory committee.

Between 2009 and 31 October 2013, about 300 police supervision orders were issued in lieu of detention and to people who had been released from detention.

=== General provisions ===
Part IV of the CLTPA contains various general provisions, including the following:

==== Dispersal of assemblies ====
Whenever the Minister for Home Affairs declares that an immediate threat to public peace exists within Singapore or any part of it, any police officer not below the rank of sergeant may command any assembly of 10 or more persons within Singapore to disperse. Any person joining or continuing in any assembly that has been commanded to disperse commits an offence and is liable to a fine not exceeding $1,000 or to imprisonment not exceeding six months or both. A dispersal declaration remains in force for not more than 48 hours, but this is without prejudice to the making of a further declaration.

==== Powers of search and boarding vessels ====
A police officer not below the rank of sergeant may, without warrant and with or without assistance, enter and search any premises, stop and search any vehicle or individual, whether in a public place or not, if he suspects that any evidence of the commission of an offence is likely to be found on the premises or individual or in the vehicle, and may seize any evidence so found. In addition, any police officer may, when on duty and on the authority of a police officer not below the rank of sergeant, stop, board and search any vessel not being or having the status of a ship of war, and remain on board so long as the vessel remains within the waters of Singapore. Any evidence of the commission of any offence may be seized. It is an offence for a person to resist, hinder or obstruct a police officer carrying out a search; on conviction he is liable to a fine not exceeding $5,000 or to imprisonment not exceeding three years or both.

==== Admission of statements in evidence ====
Where any person is charged with any offence under the Act, any statement by that person to or in the hearing of any police officer of or above the rank of sergeant shall, notwithstanding anything to the contrary contained in any written law, be admissible at his trial in evidence:

- whether the statement amounts to a confession or not;
- whether it is oral or in writing; and
- when it is made at any time, whether before or after the person is charged and whether in the course of a police investigation or not.

If the person chooses to testify in court as a witness, any such statement may be used in cross-examination and for the purpose of impeaching his credit.

However, no such statement is admissible or usable if it appears to the court that the making of the statement has been caused by any inducement, threat or promise referring to the charge against that person, proceeding from a person in authority and sufficient, in the court's opinion, to give that person grounds which would appear to him reasonable for supposing that by making it he would gain any advantage or avoid any evil of a temporal nature in reference to the proceedings against him.

==== Trials may be in camera ====
Notwithstanding anything to the contrary in any written law, a court may order that the whole or any part of any trial before it for any offence under the Act shall be dealt with in camera if it is satisfied that it is expedient in the interests of justice or of public safety or security to do so.

==== Taking of photographs, finger impressions, body samples, etc. ====
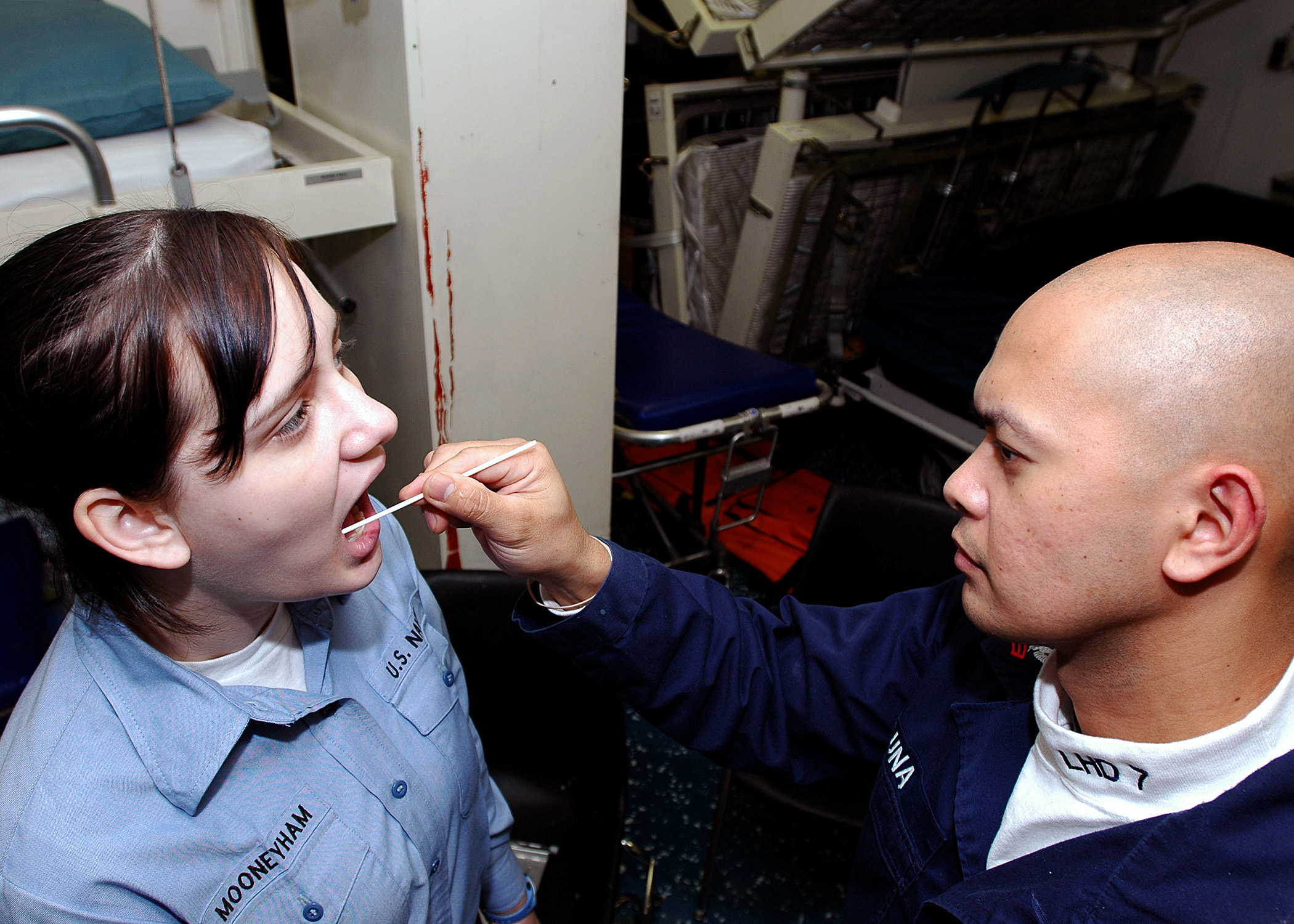
A DNA sample being taken from the inside of a person's mouth using a swab

A police officer or officer of the Central Narcotics Bureau (CNB) may exercise all or any of the following powers in respect of any person under arrest, detained or placed under police supervision under the Act:

- take or cause to be taken photographs and finger impressions of such person;
- make or cause to be made a record of the registrable particulars and any other particulars of such person;
- cause body samples of such person to be taken by an authorized person;
- send any photograph, finger impression, record of particulars or body sample so taken or made to the Commissioner of Police for identification and report.

A body sample means a sample of blood, a sample of head hair (including the root), a swab taken from the person's mouth, or any other type of sample prescribed to be a body sample by the Minister for Home Affairs.

Body samples may only be taken by a registered medical practitioner, a police officer or CNB officer who has received training, or any other suitably qualified or trained person duly appointed by the Commissioner of Police as an authorized person. Before a body sample is taken, the person taking the sample must satisfy himself that the taking of the sample does not endanger the person from whom the sample is taken. Every body sample is required to be sent to an authorised analyst for forensic DNA analysis.

A person who fails without reasonable excuse to submit to the taking of photographs and finger impressions, provide registrable particulars and other particulars, or submit to the taking of body samples commits an offence and is liable on conviction to a fine not exceeding $1,000, imprisonment not exceeding one month, or both. In addition, he can be caused to be photographed, and his finger impressions and body samples may be taken, using such force as is reasonably necessary. However, blood samples and intimate samples may not be taken without consent. (An intimate sample is any body sample obtained by means of any invasive procedure, but does not include samples to be obtained from (a) the genital or anal area of a person's body; (b) a person's body orifice other than the mouth; or (c) the breasts of a woman.)

The Commissioner of Police is required to maintain a register of all photographs, finger impressions, registrable particulars; and a DNA database. Information stored in the register and DNA database may be used for a variety of purposes, including comparison with other information obtained in the course of investigations into offences. Where an arrested person has been taken is released without having been convicted of any offence or placed on detention or supervision under the Act, all photographs, finger impressions, records of particulars or body samples taken from him must be removed from the register and DNA database.

These provisions were introduced in 2004. Senior Minister of State for Home Affairs and Law, Associate Professor Ho Peng Kee, said: "This amendment will ensure that our DNA database is more comprehensive. In turn, this will help improve intelligence and focus investigative efforts for more effective crime solving." Between 1994 and 2003, 60% of detainees and supervisees were found to have conviction records.

==== Effect of the Act ====
The provisions of the Act are in addition to and not in derogation of the provisions of any other written law and, in the event of conflict between any provision of this Act and any provision of any other written law, the provisions of the Act prevail.

== See also ==
- Criminal Law Act
- Criminal law of Singapore
- Internal Security Act (Singapore)
