= Stuart Hanlon =

American lawyer

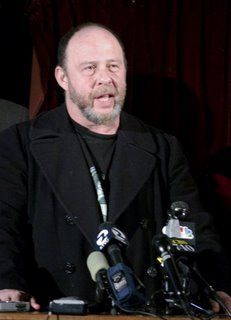
- Education: Columbia University; Hastings College of the Law
- Occupation: Lawyer
- Spouse: Kathleen Ryan (died 1997)
- Children: 2

Stuart Hanlon is an attorney based in San Francisco, California who represented San Francisco Police Chief Greg Suhr, Geronimo Pratt and members of the Symbionese Liberation Army.

== Early life ==
Hanlon was raised in New York City. He graduated from Columbia University in 1970, where he became involved with the radical politics of the '60s. In 1975, Hanlon graduated from Hastings College of the Law in San Francisco. He was known at Hastings for wearing flowing Moroccan robes and distributing politically militant leaflets.

== Geronimo Pratt ==
In 1968, Caroline Olsen was murdered by two black men on a Santa Monica tennis court. The Los Angeles Police Department had no leads until late 1970 when former Black Panther Julio Butler wrote to the LAPD that Elmer "Geronimo" Pratt had bragged to him about the tennis court killing. Pratt said that he was innocent, because the FBI had him under surveillance in Oakland when the slaying was committed in Santa Monica. In 1972, the court convicted Pratt of first-degree murder.

In 1975, as a third-year law student at Hastings, Hanlon volunteered to work as a paralegal on prisoner rights cases at San Quentin State Prison. He met Geronimo Pratt (also known as Geronimo Ji Jaga); the year before Pratt had been denied a hearing by both the California Supreme Court and the U.S. Supreme Court. At one visit, Hanlon found a steel-tipped Afro comb on his chair. After asking Pratt what it was, Pratt said "Don't touch it man. It's a setup. They'll say you're passing me a weapon. Call a guard quick.".

Over the next 25 years, Pratt was turned down for parole sixteen times and every appeal for a reversal of the guilty verdict was denied. Hanlon stated "I've been a lawyer for almost 20 years, and I win almost every trial I do... I win federal drug cases and murder trials. It just boggles my mind that we have continued to lose Pratt's case. There could be 10 reversals on the evidence we have." Hanlon developed a close relationship with Pratt, calling Pratt one of his 2 or 3 closest friends in the world.

In June 1997, Pratt was released from prison when an Orange County Superior Court judge reversed his murder conviction, on the basis that a key prosecution witness, Julius Butler was a felon and an FBI informant. In April 2000, Hanlon won a $4.5 million verdict for Pratt in his civil action suit against the city of Los Angeles and the FBI. It was the first time the FBI paid out money in a verdict when it was not involved in the prosecution. In describing the verdict, Hanlon said "they still deny culpability for what happened to Pratt. But you don't pay that amount of money if you didn't do anything wrong." Johnnie Cochran, who worked on the case with Hanlon from the beginning, has called Pratt's case the most important of his career.

== Career ==
Hanlon represented Sara Jane Olson (Kathy Soliah), Emily Harris and William Harris, three members of the Symbionese Liberation Army (SLA), for the 1975 murder of a Sacramento woman during a bank robbery in which they were joined by Patty Hearst. He also represented and won the acquittal of another member of the SLA, Russell Little, for his role in the murder of Oakland, California School Superintendent Marcus Foster.

In 1982, Hanlon and Tony Serra won an acquittal for Chol Soo Lee, exonerating him from a 1974 murder conviction. Lee spent 10 years in prison for the wrongful conviction. The case gained international attention for exposing Asian discrimination in the American judicial system. Another attorney, Leonard Weinglass, worked on the exoneration prior to Hanlon and Serra, and more credit for the success is given to activists and community members who brought public scrutiny to the case.

In 2003, Hanlon defended San Francisco Deputy Police Chief Greg Suhr against charges of conspiracy to obstruct justice. The charge arose from the investigation into a street fight in which three rookie officers were charged with felony assault, with those officers in turn accusing Suhr and ten other officers of obstructing justice. The charges were eventually dropped by the judge.

== Personal ==
Six weeks after Hanlon won Pratt a new trial, his wife, attorney Kathleen Ryan, 46, died of leukemia. The couple had two sons, Liam, who was 10, and Rory, aged five years old, when she died. The prospects of an extremely extended trial for Olson, in which Hearst was expected to be called as a witness by the prosecution, caused Hanlon to withdraw as defense counsel so he could be with his family.
