= K. Connie Kang =

Korean American journalist and author (1942–2019)

- Born: Kyonshill Kang; November 11, 1942; Hamhung, Korea, Empire of Japan
- Died: August 16, 2019 (aged 76)
- Resting place: Colma, California, U.S. , American
- Education: Northwestern University (MSc) University of Missouri (BA)
- Occupations: Journalist, author
- Notable work: Home Was the Land of Morning Calm: A Saga of a Korean-American Family (1995)

K. Connie Kang (born Kyonshill Kang; Korean: 강견실; November 11, 1942 – August 16, 2019) was a Korean American journalist and author. Born in what would become North Korea, Connie and her Christian family fled first to South Korea and then to Japan to escape religious persecution in the 1940s and 50s. They later immigrated to the United States and settled in San Francisco. Connie studied journalism at the University of Missouri and Northwestern University and began her formal journalism career in 1964, credited as being the first female Korean American reporter.

During the early 1980s, Connie Kang co-founded the Korean American Journalists Association. In early 1992, riots in Los Angeles resulted in heavy property damage to Korean American neighbourhoods, and the widespread lack of Korean-speaking reporters meant that local media struggled to accurately cover the ongoing events. Connie was subsequently hired at the Los Angeles Times, where she developed some of the first mainstream media coverage of Korean American communities and their stories.

Connie accumulated more than 30 professional awards for her work covering the California Supreme Court system, and her reporting career spanned both American and Asian publications. In 1995, she published a memoir entitled Home Was the Land of Morning Calm: A Saga of a Korean-American Family. She was awarded a lifetime achievement award by the Asian American Journalists Association in 1997.

== Early life and education ==
Kyonshill Kang (later known as K. Connie Kang) was born November 11, 1942, in Kankō, Korea, Empire of Japan (now Hamhung, North Korea). Her father, Joo Han Kang, was a language teacher, and he began teaching her English when she was three years old. His family was known for their early embrace of Christianity around 1900. In 1946, after Korea had been divided up by opposing world powers, Christian families were threatened with persecution in North Korea. Connie and her parents fled to safety in South Korea. Her grandmother guided them across the 38th parallel, along with many other relatives.

In 1950, Connie's father received the opportunity to study in the United States as a Fulbright scholar. Connie, her mother and grandmother stayed behind in Seoul, South Korea. Although at first their new home seemed secure, the outbreak of the Korean War meant that the women were eventually forced to flee again, abandoning most of their possessions and travelling by train and fishing boat to Tokyo, Japan, where they met up with Joo Han Kang again in 1952. They moved to Okinawa, and Connie attended an international school. She became fluent in English and Japanese as well as Korean.

As a young adult, Connie moved to the United States and studied journalism at the University of Missouri, finishing her Bachelor of Journalism (BJ) in 1963. She subsequently completed a Master of Science in journalism (MSJ) at Northwestern University. She was the first woman of Korean heritage to graduate with journalism degrees from these schools. In 1975, Connie's parents joined her in the United States and settled in San Francisco, California.

== Career ==
Connie Kang began her reporting career in 1964 as a writer for the Democrat & Chronicle in Rochester, New York. She went on to write for publications such as the San Francisco Chronicle, the San Francisco Examiner, and Koreatown Weekly, an early Korean American newspaper founded by K.W. Lee. Connie is considered to be the first female Korean American journalist.

In 1982, Connie co-founded the Korean American Journalists Association. The organization aimed to support journalists of recent immigrant descent and help improve the accuracy of media coverage around non-English-speaking immigrants.

In early 1992, a series of riots occurred in Los Angeles that resulted in heavy property damage in many Korean American neighbourhoods, but a widespread lack of Korean-speaking reporters at local publications meant that the media struggled to cover the story accurately. The Korean American Journalists Association encouraged the Los Angeles Times to help address this gap in coverage by hiring Connie. Beginning work there soon after, Connie became known for providing a rare outlet for Korean American communities and their stories in mainstream media.

Over the course of her career, Connie received more than 30 professional awards for her work covering the California Supreme Court system. She was named a joint recipient of awards from Investigative Reporters and Editors in 1985 and 1996. Alongside her work in American media, Connie contributed to Asian publications as a writer, editor and foreign correspondent. In 1995, she published a memoir entitled Home Was the Land of Morning Calm: A Saga of a Korean-American Family, which Kirkus Reviews called "a masterful blend of personal, family, and national history". The epitaph of Connie writes: "... tells her story in light her Christian journey and the anticipation of the peaceful reunification of the Korean Peninsula." The book was translated into Japanese by a Korean-Japanese scholar and published in Japan in 1996. Connie was awarded a lifetime achievement award by the Asian American Journalists Association in 1997.

Connie's grandfather had been known for building Christian churches in what is now North Korea. Kang's mother had dreamed of building Christian schools there, although she never had the chance, and this lost dream left an impact on Kang. Connie served Hollywood Presbyterian Church in the session as an elder. In 2008, Connie left the Los Angeles Times and decided to pursue a new career as a Christian minister, eventually graduating from the Fuller Theological Seminary in 2017. She had plans to return to North Korea and establish a Christian school, but never completed the journey.

Having passed her ordination exams of PC(USA), Connie applied for Associate Pastor position to Golden Gate Presbyterian Church (GGPC) in Daly City, CA, where Joo Han Kang, her father, had served as an elder to the point of his death in 1998. She wanted to participate in the mission education in Rwanda and Hoopa Native American Reservation through SPRiNG Bible Academy, a non-denominational non-profit organization. And she hoped to serve the Kang Center, which includes Emmanuel Press, S.W. Choi Prayer Hall, and Joo Han Kang Library.

== Death ==
Connie Kang died on August 16, 2019, aged 76, from pancreatic cancer. She was buried in Cypress Lawn Funeral Home & Memorial Park in Colma, CA, at the family plot. It was a summer afternoon when her loved ones gathered for the funeral services with Psalm 23 and hymns. Reflecting on Kang's legacy, K.W. Lee wrote that Kang's reporting career "was a quiet, almost divine mission to give a clear voice to those who aren't heard and can't speak English," and that her death was "mourned by thousands in the Korean community and beyond." The epitaph reads last: "She was a woman of integrity, compassion, courage, and love."
