= Lust for Justice =

Book by Paulette Frankl

- Author: Paulette Frankl
- Illustrator: Paulette Frankl
- Cover artist: Paulette Frankl
- Language: English
- Genre: Biography, True crime
- Publisher: Lightning Rod Publications
- Publication date: October 22, 2010
- Publication place: United States
- Pages: 292 pp (Paperback ed)
- ISBN: 0-615-38683-0

Lust for Justice: The Radical Life and Law of J. Tony Serra is a non-fiction biographical account by author and courtroom artist Paulette Frankl about renowned counterculture defense attorney J. Tony Serra.

Serra began his practice in the 1960s, an era he has called the golden age of law. The book, which took 17 years for Frankl to write, was edited by Deke Castleman with a foreword by defense attorney Gerry Spence.

== Book background ==
Frankl, a courtroom artist, spent more than a decade following Serra from courtroom to courtroom, sketching and painting him as he defended clients, many of whom were charged with murder. "I didn't want to write a book about him," Frankl told the San Francisco Bay Guardian. "I wanted to be his artist."

The first large case she attended was Serra's representation of Ellie Nesler, who, during a court hearing, gunned down and killed her son's accused molester. After watching Serra's performance during Nesler's trial, Frankl told Serra, "Let's do (a book) -- your words, my art," according to The Sixties blog. Frankl and Serra "scribbled out an agreement" on the hood of her car in a parking lot.

But as time went on, it became evident Serra was too busy in court to write his autobiography, and Frankl began penning a biography.

Cases captured in words and images in the book include Huey Newton and the Black Panthers, the White Panthers, Russell Little, Kathleen Soliah with the SLA, the Hells Angels, Chol Soo Lee, Hooty Croy, Bear Lincoln, Judi Bari, and Rick Tabish in the Ted Binion homicide case. It also includes Serra's two prison terms for tax evasion.

San Francisco Chronicle columnist Leah Garchik quoted Serra as saying, at the end of the book, "By nature, I'm egotistic, self-centered, domineering, obsessive and vain. Yet these are the qualities, shallow as they may be, that allow me to dominate in court.

== Book launch ==
The book was launched in November 2010 at an event held at the historical Fort Mason Center, not far from Serra's Pier 5 Law Offices, a co-op in North Beach. The launch marked the beginning of a book tour that included print and radio interviews and signings at book stores, libraries and other venues in Northern California, which Serra attended. "I am a creation of the Sixties," Serra told KPFA during a book event sponsored by the station. "The greatest influence on me was the ideology of the Sixties: anti-materialism, brotherhood, nonracism, love. Those are things I still believe in."

In May 2011, Frankl sat on a panel at the annual Law Journal Summit, titled "Justice by the Book," with Serra and two legal writers, Mary McDonagh Murphy and Sheldon Siegel, with Serra being billed as a "fiery, counter-culture defense attorney considered to be among the very best in the nation."

== Reception ==
About the finished product, the Bay Guardian's Caitlin Donohue wrote, "(The book) is a story of a man who doesn't compromise on anything -- from courtroom theatrics to lost-cause cases, to getting high and/or performing Native American protective rites before court sessions. ... Told by a woman who was there for much of the story, Lust for Justice certainly lives up to its red-blooded title."

West Coast Leaf's Mikki Norris wrote in her review, "Reading Lust for Justice is like going on an incredible, intellectual, philosophical, poetic and artistic ride that engages the reader to think deeply about life and the concepts of freedom and justice. It’s a gripping biography about one of the greatest criminal defense trial attorneys of the 20th Century." And in November 2010, the San Francisco Chronicle featured Frankl and the book in an article by arts-and-entertainment reporter Louis Peitzman.

It was included in Publishers Weekly's second quarterly PW Select listing in March 2011.

The e-book has remained on Amazon's Top 100 bestselling list since its release.

== Awards ==
Lust for Justice won honorable mention at the 2012 London Book Festival.
