= Paulette Frankl =

American courtroom artist and author (born 1937)

- Born: 25 February 1937 (age 89); California, U.S.
- Education: Stanford University
- Occupations: Artist, author

Paulette Frankl (born 25 February 1937) is an American courtroom artist and author.

== Biography ==
Frankl was born in California and attended Stanford University, where she majored in art and languages.

Frankl exhibited her first artwork in Los Angeles, California, at age 7 in a joint show with her father, Paul T. Frankl, an Art Deco furniture designer and architect. She worked with author Christopher Long, sharing documents, photos, and family background for a 2007 biography of her father.

== Courtroom art and paintings ==
Her courtroom sketches, drawings and paintings from both federal and superior cases have aired on CNN, NBC, ABC, CBS, Fox, WGN-TV and "Talk America" and have taken her to the U.S. Supreme Court. In 2008, Frankl was included in a feature story by photographer David Friedman about courtroom artists and their work outside the courtroom.

Frankl has authored a biography titled Lust for Justice about J. Tony Serra, a radical civil rights, criminal defense attorney and tax resister, about whom the 1989 film True Believer starring James Woods and Robert Downey, Jr. was based. The book, which launched in San Francisco in November 2010, includes Frankl's original courtroom art done during Serra's trials. The San Francisco Chronicle called the book a reflection "on the work of a larger-than-life persona."

Her paintings were included in 2005 in a two-month-long Las Vegas Art Museum exhibit titled "XV Santa Fe Artists." In October 2004, she was a featured artist, with her art on display, at the Las Vegas Fine Arts Salon, as part of the 2004 Las Vegas Book Festival.

== Photography ==
Frankl has worked as a photojournalist for international magazines and has lived in the U.S. and Europe. Her work includes a cover photo on France's Réalités magazine. Also, while overseas, she worked as a staff photographer for Gruner & Jahr's Twen and Eltern magazines. The German GEO Magazine in the 1970s profiled Frankl's lifestyle in California, and she was also featured in Sunset magazine. Her photos are also featured inside and on the cover of The Lost Dogs of Shoretown: A Koko the Canine Detective Mystery by Annie Mack about the coastal village of Bolinas, where Frankl lived for nine years and from where she commuted to San Francisco courthouses as a courtroom artist. Frankl also illustrated the 1993 book Animals... Our Return to Wholeness by Penelope Smith.

== Mime ==
Frankl also has worked as a performance artist in the fields of magic and pantomime. Her association with Marcel Marceau as collaborator and muse spanned 30 years, resulting in a memoir Marcel & Me, released in 2014. Her appearance doing mime and magic at Carnival of Venice in the late 1970s was featured on Italian television. In 2006, she completed the Bob Fitch Performance Workshop Theater Training for Magicians, held in Canada.

== Personal life ==
She is the daughter of art deco furniture designer Paul T. Frankl, granddaughter of a land speculator in Vienna, Austria, and the mother of Nicolas Koenig, a creative director for theme parks and interactive game design. Frankl lives in Santa Fe, New Mexico.

== Books ==
- Lust for Justice: The Radical Life & Law of J. Tony Serra, by Paulette Frankl, edited by Deke Castleman, foreword by Gerry Spence
- Marcel & Me: A Memoir of Love, Lust, and Illusion, by Paulette Frankl
