= Press room and press corps of the South Korean government =

Press room refers to a place provided by government agencies, political parties, corporations, etc., for reporters. The group of reporters who are stationed in these press rooms is called the press corps (出入記者團) or reporter corps (出入處記者團), often shortened to just the press corps. In Japan, such organizations are referred to as kisha clubs. This article explains the press rooms and press corps of the South Korean Government (hereafter referred to as press rooms or press corps).

Government department press rooms were operated under a reporter access system, where reporters had to join the press corps to use the press rooms. Membership in the press corps was mostly limited to newspaper and broadcast companies. The exclusive and closed operation of press rooms faced constant criticism, and as the number of media outlets increased rapidly with the spread of the internet, conflicts surrounding press room management surfaced. In 2003, the Roh Moo-hyun administration introduced the open briefing room system, effectively abolishing government press rooms. Media outlets and reporters fiercely opposed this and had conflicts with the government. After Lee Myung-bak was elected president, the Presidential Transition Committee decided to restore the press rooms.

== History ==
From the 1920s, both Korean and Japanese reporters began forming press corps at government agencies (출입처) under the influence of Japan's Kisha Club. Organizations like Gwanghwa Club, composed of reporters covering the Chōsen Government-General Communications Bureau and its officials, and Ewha Club, created by reporters covering the Iwangjik, were established. After Korean liberation, reporters began forming press corps at institutions run by the United States Army Military Government in Korea.

The media environment remained largely unchanged through the 1950s, but after the May 16 coup in 1961, the media landscape shifted dramatically. Following the April Revolution, an influx of media companies led to the rise of illegitimate reporters, and corruption in the press corps became well known, fueling negative perceptions of the media. The military government used this as justification to label the media as corrupt and sought to exert strict control. The Park Chung-hee administration arbitrarily limited the number of reporters permitted at Cheong Wa Dae to facilitate media control and established a press room there in 1963. The so-called agrément system was introduced, where the Cheong Wa Dae administration approved press room access. Since there was no alternative way for reporters to obtain press releases, they had little choice but to comply with the government's policies. This practice of covering official statements from government spokespersons became standard, and in 1967, the government institutionalized this by officially placing public information officers in each ministry.

In 1972, the Park Chung-hee government issued press cards to all reporters, each with a unique identification number, and restricted the issuance of these cards to reduce the number of reporters. Press cards were not issued to reporters for weekly or monthly magazines, further reinforcing a system centered on daily newspapers and broadcasters from Seoul. The exclusive and closed use of press rooms became even more entrenched. After the introduction of press cards, the Park government reduced the number of press rooms in government ministries from 47 to 18 and cut the number of reporters allowed from 790 to 465.

The press room system became even more firmly established during the Chun Doo-hwan administration as part of its media policies. The government reduced the number of media outlets through the 1980 media consolidation, and established a system of effective information control through the use of reporting guidelines. However, the remaining media outlets were granted preferential treatment, allowing them to maintain dominant positions in the market. This eliminated competition among media outlets, and the press rooms and press corps transformed into exclusive organizations that shared privileges rather than serving as mechanisms for news reporting.

Following the June 29 Declaration and the subsequent establishment of a direct presidential election system, the media landscape rapidly changed once again after the inauguration of the Roh Tae-woo administration in 1988. Competition intensified with the launch of new newspapers and the revival of old ones, and instances of breaking the news embargo became more frequent. During this time, previously hidden practices such as reporters accepting money or hospitality (chonji) became widely known. In 1991, the press corps covering the Ministry of Health and Welfare collected about 88.5 million won from pharmaceutical companies, confectionery companies, cosmetics companies, and organizations such as the Daewoo Foundation and Hyundai Asan Foundation under the guise of Chuseok holiday bonuses and travel expenses. This event became known as the “Ministry of Health and Welfare chonji incident.” In a rare move, the implicated media outlets issued apologies and statements, and newspapers such as Chosun Ilbo and Dong-a Ilbo declared they would withdraw from or not join the press corps. However, these declarations were eventually forgotten, and the media outlets rejoined the press corps.

To eliminate the downsides of the press room system, the Roh Moo-hyun administration introduced the open briefing room system in 2003. The government press rooms, which had operated under a closed reporter access system, were opened and converted into briefing rooms and transmission rooms (Note: According to the 〈Rules on the Registration of Reporters at Cheong Wa Dae〉, in order to engage in reporting activities at Cheong Wa Dae, reporters must be recommended by member companies of the Korea News Editors' Association, Korean Broadcasting Association, Journalists Association of Korea, Internet Newspaper Association, Internet Reporters' Association, Korean Press Photographers Association, Korea TV Camera Journalists Association, Korea Online Newspaper Association, or the Seoul Foreign Correspondents' Club.) operated under a registration system. (Note: As of 2007, the terms press room, briefing room, and transmission room were used interchangeably, but press rooms, accessible only to members of the press corps, are fundamentally different from briefing rooms and transmission rooms, which can be used freely by registered reporters from various ministries.) The Ministry of Culture and Tourism was the first to open its press room on April 16, 2003, and other ministries gradually followed. However, some ministries' transmission rooms became monopolized by press corps members, resembling the previous exclusive press rooms.

However, during the process of the 2007 presidential election, this issue came to light, leading prominent presidential candidates such as Jeong Dong-young, Lee Myung-bak, Kwon Young-gil, Lee In-je, Moon Kook-hyun, and Lee Hoi-chang to oppose the Roh Moo-hyun administration's open briefing room system. In particular, Jeong Dong-young, who had served as the Minister of Unification during the Roh administration, stated, "I agree with the intention, but I do not agree with the current method of execution. Freedom of the press must be guaranteed to prevent the bureaucratic society from suffering from arteriosclerosis. We will ensure access to fulfill the people's right to know." He expressed his opposition. The elected President Lee Myung-bak and the transition committee decided to eliminate the press support advancement measures of the Roh administration and restore the press rooms of each ministry. They also decided to abolish the National Security Office, which promoted this.

On January 24, 2011, the Ministry of National Defense requested the press corps to delay reporting in consideration of the safety of the crew of the Samho Jewelry, who were kidnapped by Somali pirates, during the execution of the "Operation Aden Gulf." After the first rescue operation failed on January 18, the Busan Ilbo broke the embargo on January 20 and reported the incident, which was quoted by Media Today. On the 21st, Asia Today also reported the incident. The Ministry of National Defense requested the deletion of the article, and the Busan Ilbo deleted the article posted on its website, but Media Today and Asia Today refused to delete it. The Ministry of National Defense indefinitely suspended the press room access for reporters from the media that violated the embargo and ceased distributing press materials. Additionally, they sent a letter requesting sanctions to other ministries. As a result, the Blue House canceled the press registration of reporters from Asia Today and Media Today and banned the reporter from the Busan Ilbo from entering the press room for one month. Asia Today opposed the Blue House's actions and filed a cancellation request and a provisional injunction against the cancellation of the press registration at the Seoul Administrative Court. The Blue House and Asia Today accepted the court's mediation recommendation and reduced the penalty to a two-month suspension of access for Asia Today's reporter.

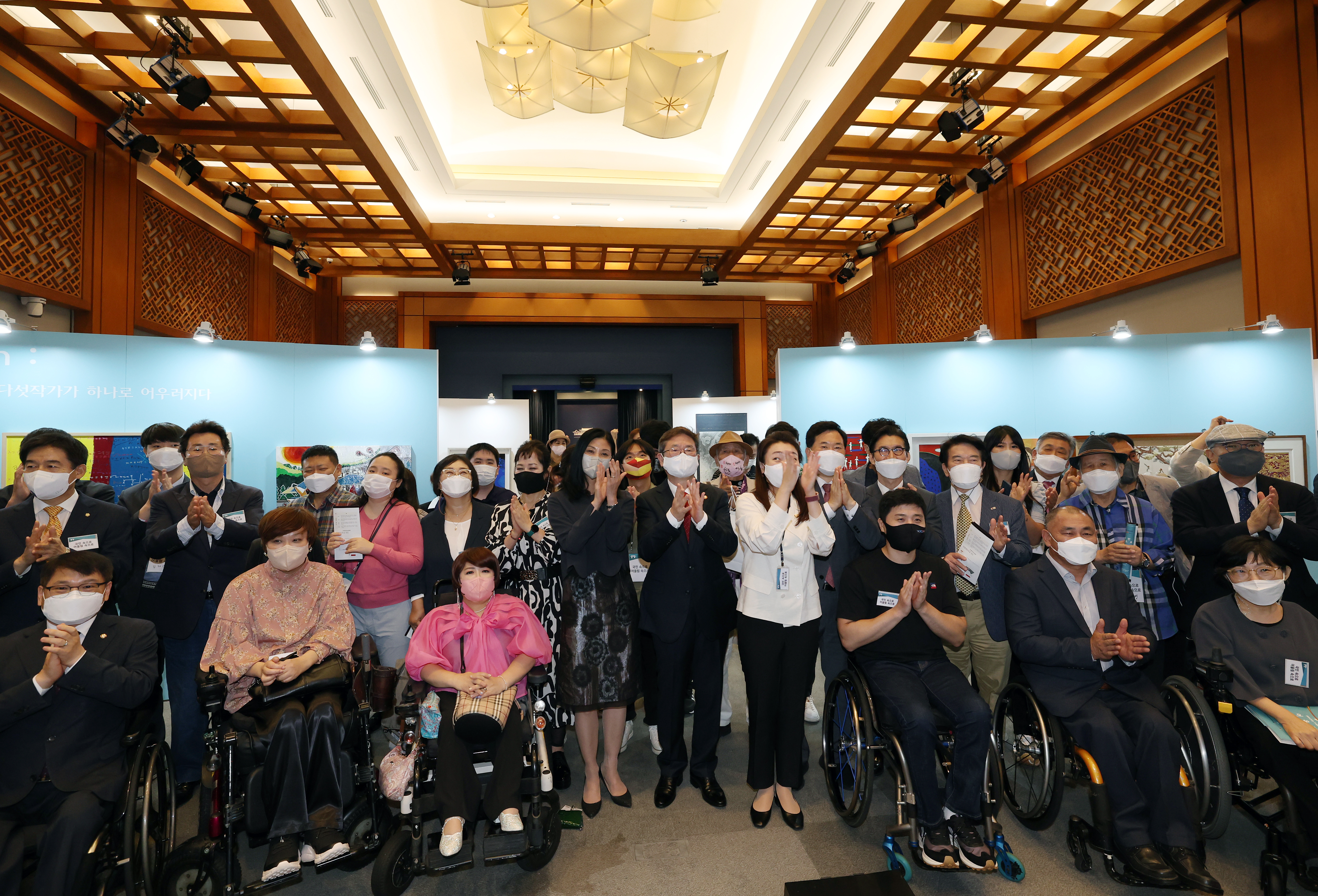

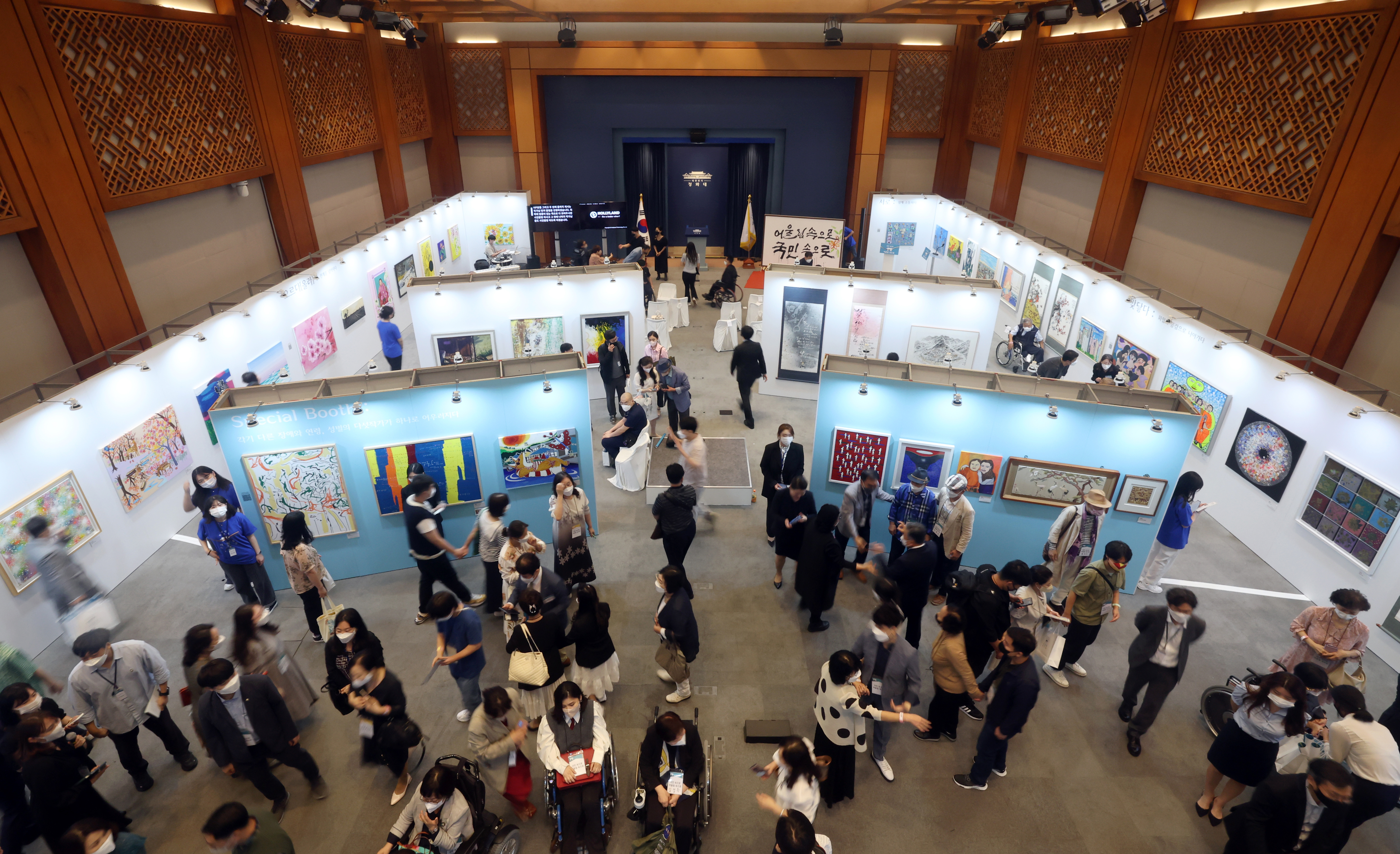
On August 31, 2022, the opening ceremony of the special exhibition for disabled artists, 'Into the People, Into the Harmony,' was held at the Cheong Wa Dae Chunchugwan.

President Yoon Suk-yeol decided to move the presidential residence from Cheong Wa Dae to the Ministry of National Defense building in Yongsan after his election. With Cheong Wa Dae fulfilling its role, the Chunchugwan (the press center) officially concluded its function as a press center after 32 years since 1990. On March 20, 2022, while still a president-elect, Yoon Suk-yeol and the transition committee announced plans to set up a press room and press conference hall on the first floor of the new building in Yongsan after the relocation. This was interpreted as an attempt to differentiate from the previous arrangement where the Chunchugwan was in a separate building from the presidential office. After Cheong Wa Dae was fully opened on May 10 of the same year, the Chunchugwan was opened to visitors along with the Yeongbingwan on May 23. As Cheong Wa Dae was transformed into a complex cultural and artistic space, an art exhibition featuring works by disabled artists was held on August 31 in the second floor of the Chunchugwan, which had previously served as a media briefing venue. This exhibition marked the first of its kind held at Cheong Wa Dae.

=== Access to Cheong Wa Dae ===
A chart showing the number of media organizations allowed access to Cheong Wa Dae before the transition to a registration system during the Roh Moo-hyun administration.

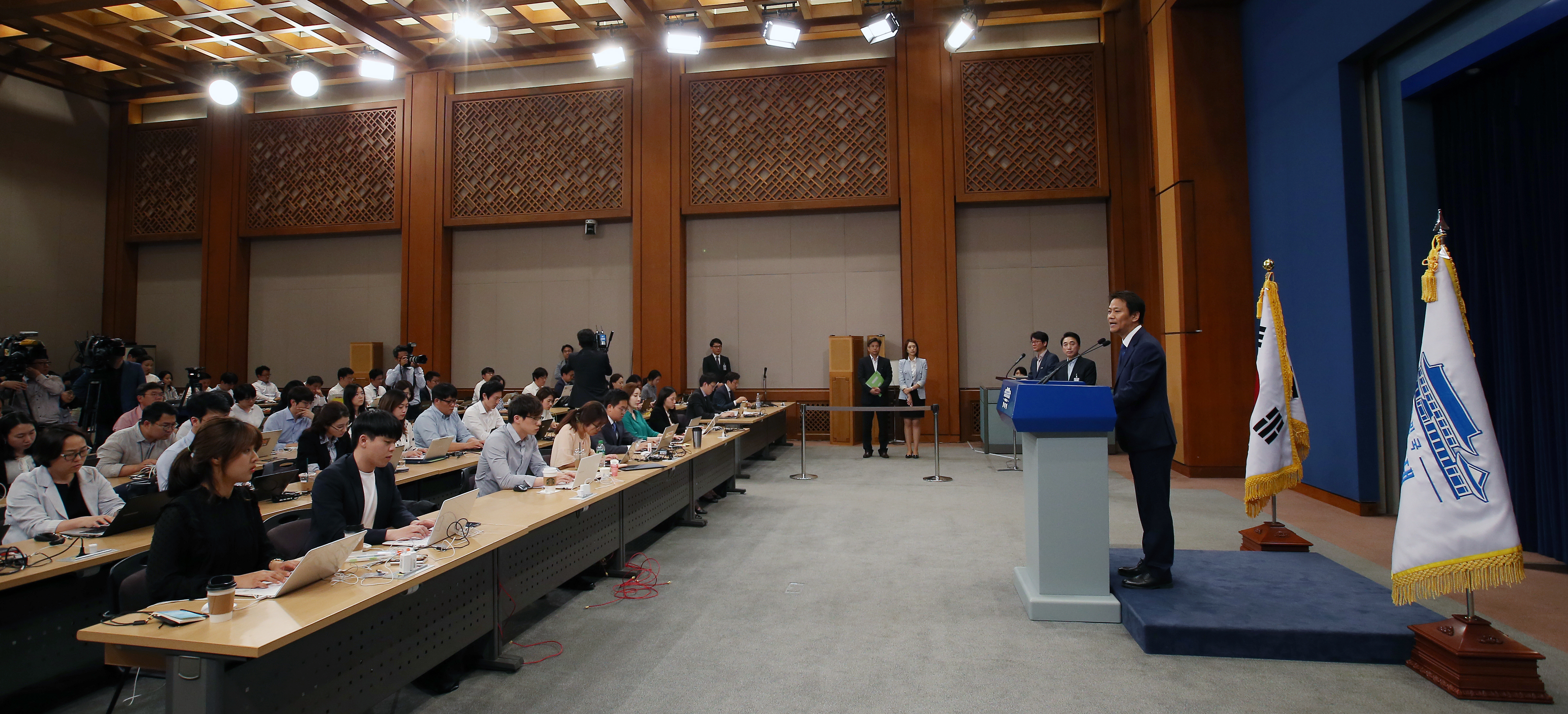
During the Chun Doo-hwan administration, access to Cheong Wa Dae was permitted for 25 reporters belonging to 11 central media outlets, while access for local media and economic newspapers was denied. Reports that deviated from the guidelines issued by Cheong Wa Dae were strictly controlled, and personal reporting was not allowed. When the Roh Tae-woo administration was inaugurated in February 1988, access was granted to reporters from four local newspapers and two economic newspapers, increasing the number of media organizations allowed access to 17. In September 1990, the Chunchugwan, as a press center, was opened, and by the end of that year, reporters from The Hankyoreh, Kookmin Ilbo, Segye Ilbo, and CBS (Christian Broadcasting) founded in the late 1980s were allowed access. In the early 1990s, some reporters from local newspapers were also allowed access to Cheong Wa Dae. In February 1993, when the Kim Young-sam administration began, the number of central media organizations permitted access to Cheong Wa Dae rose to 24, and local media organizations to 20. After the inauguration of the Kim Dae-jung administration, the number of central media organizations increased to 25 and local media organizations to 23. The Roh Moo-hyun administration abolished the press room in 2003 and introduced the open briefing room system, fully opening the Chunchugwan on June 2.

== Relationship with the Press Access System ==
The press access system refers to the areas where reporters conduct their coverage, with groups of reporters sharing the same access being called press corps, and the space where the press corps resides being referred to as the press room. Reporters who cover administrative departments or the judiciary are required to join a press corps to reside in the press room, and they must undergo a review process to gain membership in the press corps. There are no written regulations for the review process of the press corps, which follows the practices of each individual press room. Newly joined reporters must undergo a probationary period to verify whether the newly joining media outlet will continue to dispatch reporters. Central daily newspapers, English-language newspapers, and public broadcasting stations are generally eligible for membership, while magazines, online newspapers, and foreign press are restricted from access except in exceptional cases.

== Embargo Practices by the Press Corps ==
In South Korea, the term "news embargo" was introduced in the 1960s when military regimes came to power. The military government sought to break away from the existing ad-hoc media policies by adopting American-style reporting principles. They used embargoes, off-the-record remarks, and background briefings appropriately to reduce the impression of oppression and regulate the media.

The press room system was perceived as necessary to uphold embargoes. Due to their nature of work, investigative agencies like the Prosecutor's Office and the National Police Agency often placed embargoes on information. They worried that if all media attended a briefing about the progress of an investigation based on an embargo, it could lead to a breach of that embargo and disrupt the investigation.

Embargoes were well maintained in the 1980s, but began to frequently break down in the 1990s. This breakdown was not necessarily due to political or social considerations, but often occurred to reduce competition among media outlets. However, with many media outlets launching or relaunching in the 1990s, competition intensified, leading to a situation where if one outlet broke an embargo, others would follow suit. Additionally, while violating an embargo could result in restrictions on using the press room, these penalties lacked effectiveness, leading to a situation in the 1990s where the press corps lost its ability to reasonably regulate and could not effectively limit embargo violations.

== Unscheduled Visits by the Press Corps ==
The press corps had the privilege to freely enter the offices where public officials worked and meet them for interviews. However, since the inauguration of the Roh Tae-woo administration, the government has continuously attempted to restrict reporters' visits to government offices. Before the opening of the Chunchugwan (the press center), the press room at the Blue House was located within the building housing the secretariat, allowing reporters to freely visit most secretarial offices except for the main building, which houses the president's office, and the official residence. However, once the Chunchugwan opened and the press room was separated from the secretariat building, reporters faced some restrictions on randomly covering the president and secretaries. The Blue House began efforts to prevent reporters from visiting the secretariat at their discretion starting from the Roh Tae-woo administration. The Kim Young-sam administration blocked visits to the secretariat, but after three months, reporters collectively applied for visits and staged protests by roaming the offices within the secretariat, ultimately leading to the resumption of access.

During the Kim Dae-jung administration, spokesperson Park Ji-won prohibited visits to the secretariat, stating that he would provide regular briefings on daily activities and various events involving the president. Reporters opposed this decision and sent a delegation to Kim Joong-kwon, the head of the secretariat, demanding the lifting of the prohibition. However, receiving no significant response, they directly requested President Kim Dae-jung, who was visiting the UK at the time, to take measures. In response, the Blue House allowed visits but restricted access to the secretariat building by opening the door leading from the Chunchugwan to the secretariat from 11 AM to 12 PM and from 4 PM to 5 PM, allowing visits only to the offices of the chief secretary and senior secretaries. While they decided not to contact general secretaries and administrative officers, this was often not adhered to. During the Roh Moo-hyun administration, in 2003, the system of open briefing rooms was implemented, prohibiting reporters from freely entering offices and requiring them to follow procedures for visits. Furthermore, in 2007, the plan for advancing the reporting support system was introduced, fully banning such visits.

Reporters argued that restricting or banning unscheduled visits to offices limits press freedom by preventing them from covering information that is difficult to obtain through briefings or information that officials are reluctant to disclose. In response, President Roh Moo-hyun stated, "It is impossible for public officials to work normally in offices that reporters can freely enter. Most reporters in developed countries do not demand unrestricted access to offices."

== Debate Surrounding the Press Room and the Press Corps ==
=== Pro-Maintenance Viewpoint ===
Those advocating for the maintenance of the press room argue that being close to the agency allows for the observation of operational procedures, content, and outcomes, thereby preventing information concealment and distortion, and further enabling power surveillance. (Refer to #Unscheduled Visits by the Press Corps) They also note that the press corps has the advantage of collectively responding to undue suppression of the press by power. For instance, the Japanese press club, which influenced the domestic press corps, originated from the parliamentary press corps organized in opposition to a bill prohibiting newspaper reporters in Tokyo from covering the Imperial Diet during the Meiji era (1890). (Refer to Press Club)

It is argued that having a press room within an institution serves as a silent pressure on that agency, prompting it to voluntarily disclose information and increasing the volume of available information. Additionally, when an institution or police station without a press room has information to announce, they tend to seek out press rooms established in other institutions, indicating that the press room also serves as a promotional channel.

The press room and the press corps are said to play a role in controlling unnecessary competition between media outlets. Through the press room and the press corps, they can organize pools (Note: A pool refers to the practice of designating a representative reporter when journalists accompany the president at official events, allowing coverage within a limited scope.) or easily impose embargoes. (Refer to #Embargo Practices by the Press Corps)

=== Pro-Abolition Viewpoint ===
Those supporting the abolition of press rooms argue that these rooms block access to sources for alternative and small media outlets, infringing upon the freedom of the press that everyone should enjoy. For instance, on March 28, 2001, OhmyNews reporter Choi Kyung-joon was expelled by the press corps while attempting to cover a briefing at Incheon International Airport's press room.

Moreover, reporters stationed in the press room tend to rely on press releases provided by sources to write articles, leading to a homogenization of information. In fact, approximately 80% of news reports from newspapers and broadcasting stations in South Korea in 2005 were based on press releases. (Refer to #Disadvantages) Furthermore, excessive dependence on press releases makes it difficult for reporters to develop expertise in their fields of coverage. For example, many reporters in South Korea who became unemployed after the financial crisis struggled to find reemployment, whereas in the U.S., many retired reporters often published books based on their reporting experiences and became bestselling authors.

Critics also argue that the proximity between reporters and sources leads to cases where reporters are more likely to be co-opted by their sources rather than vice versa. Instances of sources providing gifts and favors to the press corps have occurred frequently, with a notable incident being the ‘Ministry of Health and Welfare bribery case’ in 1991. (Refer to #History)

Finally, some argue that advancements in information and communication technology, such as laptops and mobile phones, have made it possible to conduct interviews anytime and anywhere, eliminating the need for reporters to wait in the press room for newsworthy events to arise.
