= Geronimo Pratt =

American political activist (1947–2011)

- Born: Elmer Pratt; September 13, 1947; Morgan City, Louisiana, U.S.
- Died: June 2, 2011 (aged 63); Tanzania
- Resting place: Pratt's body was cremated and scattered somewhere in Tanzania.
- Citizenship: United States of America (birthplace), Tanzania
- Education: UCLA, Sumpter Williams High School (Morgan City, Louisiana)
- Occupation: Deputy Minister of Defense of the Southern California Chapter of the Black Panther Party
- Known for: Overturned murder conviction
- Political party: Black Panther Party
- Movement: Black Power Movement
- Criminal charge: Murder
- Criminal penalty: 27 years in prison
- Criminal status: Released (conviction vacated)
- Military Career
- Allegiance: United States of America
- Branch: United States Army
- Rank: Sergeant
- Conflicts: Vietnam War
- Awards: Silver Star; Bronze Star (2); Purple Heart (2)

Elmer Gerard "Geronimo" Pratt (September 13, 1947 – June 2, 2011), also known as Geronimo Ji-Jaga and Geronimo Ji-Jaga Pratt, was a decorated military veteran and a high-ranking member of the Black Panther Party in the United States in the late 1960s and early 1970s. Born in Louisiana, he served two tours in Vietnam, receiving several decorations. He moved to Los Angeles, where he studied at UCLA under the GI Bill and joined the Black Panther Party. He was wrongfully convicted of murder, and imprisoned. After being exonerated, Pratt went on to be a human rights activist and godfather to Tupac Shakur.

The Federal Bureau of Investigation targeted Pratt in a COINTELPRO operation in the early 1970s, intended to "neutralize Pratt as an effective BPP functionary." Pratt was tried and convicted in 1972 for the 1968 murder of Caroline Olsen; he served 27 years in prison, eight of which were in solitary confinement. Pratt was freed in 1997 when his conviction was vacated due to the prosecution's having withheld exculpatory evidence which showed that he was 400 miles away at the time of the murder, and that the key witness in his case had been an FBI informant. This decision was upheld on appeal.

He worked as a human rights activist until the time of his death. Pratt was also the godfather of the late rapper Tupac Shakur. He died of a heart attack in Tanzania, on June 3, 2011.

== Early years and military service ==
Elmer Pratt was born in Morgan City, Louisiana to Jack Pratt and Eunice Petty. His father was in the scrap metal business. Pratt was a star quarterback at Sumpter Williams High School.

He served two combat tours as a soldier in the Vietnam War, reaching the rank of sergeant. He was highly decorated, earning two Bronze Stars, a Silver Star, and two Purple Hearts. He later moved to Los Angeles.

== UCLA and Black Panther Party ==
After leaving the Army, Pratt studied political science at UCLA, using a grant provided by the GI Bill. Pratt became politically active and was recruited into the Black Panthers by Bunchy Carter and John Huggins. When Pratt joined the Black Panthers, his years in the army proved useful. He rose to become Deputy Minister of Defense of the local organization, after Bunchy Carter and John Huggins were killed by COINTELPRO infiltrators in the Us Organization. He took the name "Geronimo," after a prominent Apache chief and leader of resistance to US domination, and "Ji-Jaga," after a Central African tribe.

In 1971, his wife Saundra was killed when she was 8 months pregnant and her body was left in a ditch. The murder was attributed at the time to a BPP schism between supporters of Huey Newton and those of Eldridge Cleaver; Pratt and his wife belonged to the Cleaver faction. Pratt later believed this account was an FBI lie, and that Saundra's murder was unrelated to her activities in the Black Panther Party.

By January 1970, the Los Angeles FBI office had sought permission from national headquarters for a counterintelligence effort "designed to challenge the legitimacy of the authority exercised" by Pratt in the local Panthers. Another FBI memo, dated five months later, noted that the Bureau was constantly considering counterintelligence measures designed to neutralize Pratt "as an effective (Panther) functionary."

== Murder charges ==
In 1968, Caroline Olsen, a 27-year-old elementary school teacher, was murdered by gunshot during a robbery on a Santa Monica tennis court. Olsen's husband, Kenneth, who was also shot but survived, identified Pratt as the killer in an eyewitness line-up. Julius Butler, a police informant and infiltrator inside the Black Panther Party, testified that Pratt had confessed to him and discussed the murder with him on several occasions. In 1970, Pratt was arrested and charged with murder and kidnapping.

His attorney, Johnnie Cochran, argued that the charges should be dropped. He claimed that Pratt had been 350 miles away on the night of the murder. Pratt was convicted in 1972. Journalist and author Jack Olsen reported that FBI "moles" had infiltrated defense sessions and monitored Cochran's phone calls.

== Prison ==
While Pratt was incarcerated at Mule Creek State Prison, he studied law and built a defense. Attorney Stuart Hanlon, who had helped represent him in his first trial, and William Paparian worked on the appeals that resulted in Pratt's conviction being vacated. In an interview with Reuters he recalled being held in solitary confinement in a cell near cult leader Charles Manson, with only big ants to keep him company.

== Murder conviction vacated ==
The conviction was vacated on June 10, 1997, on the grounds that the prosecution had concealed evidence that might have influenced the jury's verdict. Police wiretaps showed that he was present at a Black Panther meeting in Oakland, 400 miles away from the murder in L.A. at the time of the murder. The prosecution had not disclosed the extent to which a key witness against Pratt, Julius Butler, was an informant to the FBI and the Los Angeles Police Department. The state appealed the decision, but an appeals court in 1999 ruled this fact to be "'favorable' to the defendant, 'suppressed' by a law enforcement agency, and 'material' to the jury's decision to convict;" it upheld the decision to vacate the conviction, freeing him.

On July 24, 1997, Pratt returned to his hometown of Morgan City, Louisiana, to see his aged mother, Eunice. He had not seen her in 23 years, since she rode a bus to visit him at Folsom Prison.

In 1998, Pratt's longtime friend and attorney Johnnie Cochran, filed a federal civil lawsuit against the FBI and the LAPD, accusing them of malicious prosecution and false imprisonment. With the help of Brian T. Dunn, another attorney at The Cochran Firm, the suit was settled for $4.5 million. A federal judge approved the settlement of the civil suit: the City of Los Angeles paid $2.75 million of the settlement and the US Department of Justice paid the remaining $1.75 million.

== Later years ==
Pratt continued to work until his death on behalf of men and women wrongfully convicted. He participated in rallies in support of Mumia Abu-Jamal, whom he had met when both were active as Black Panthers. In his later years, he moved to Tanzania, where he was living at the time of his death.

== Sources ==
- Olsen, Jack. Last Man Standing: The Tragedy and Triumph of Geronimo Pratt. Knopf Doubleday Publishing Group (2000) ISBN 0-385-49367-3
