= Paul T. Frankl =

American architect (1886–1958)

- Born: Paul Theodore Frankl; October 14, 1886; Vienna, Austria
- Died: March 21, 1958 (aged 71); Los Angeles, California, United States
- Occupation: Architect
- Practice: Art Deco, fine art
- Projects: Skyscraper

Paul T. Frankl (October 14, 1886 – March 21, 1958), an Art Deco furniture designer and maker, architect, painter and writer from Vienna, Austria, was the son of a wealthy real estate speculator.

== Career ==
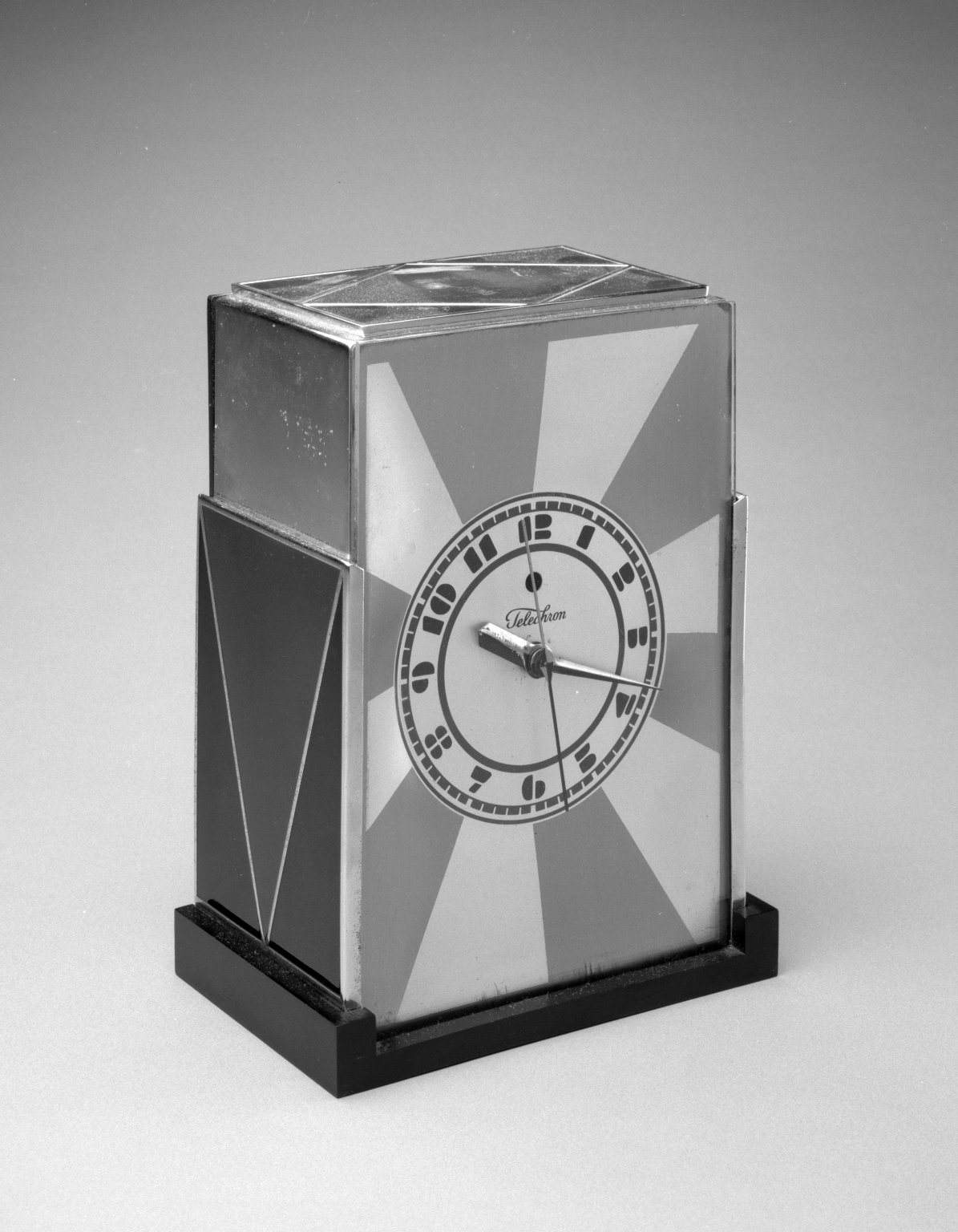
Paul T. Frankl. Clock, late 1920s Brooklyn Museum

After Frankl completed his architectural studies at the Technische Hochschule in Charlottenburg (now Technische Universität Berlin), he traveled, spending time in Berlin and Copenhagen before arriving in the United States in April 1914. He settled in New York City and brought with him an outsider's fresh perspective and an enthusiasm for forging a uniquely American design aesthetic. Frankl began as an architect and later switched to designing and painting fine art and furniture. In the years between the two world wars he, more than any other designer, helped shape the distinctive look of American modernism.

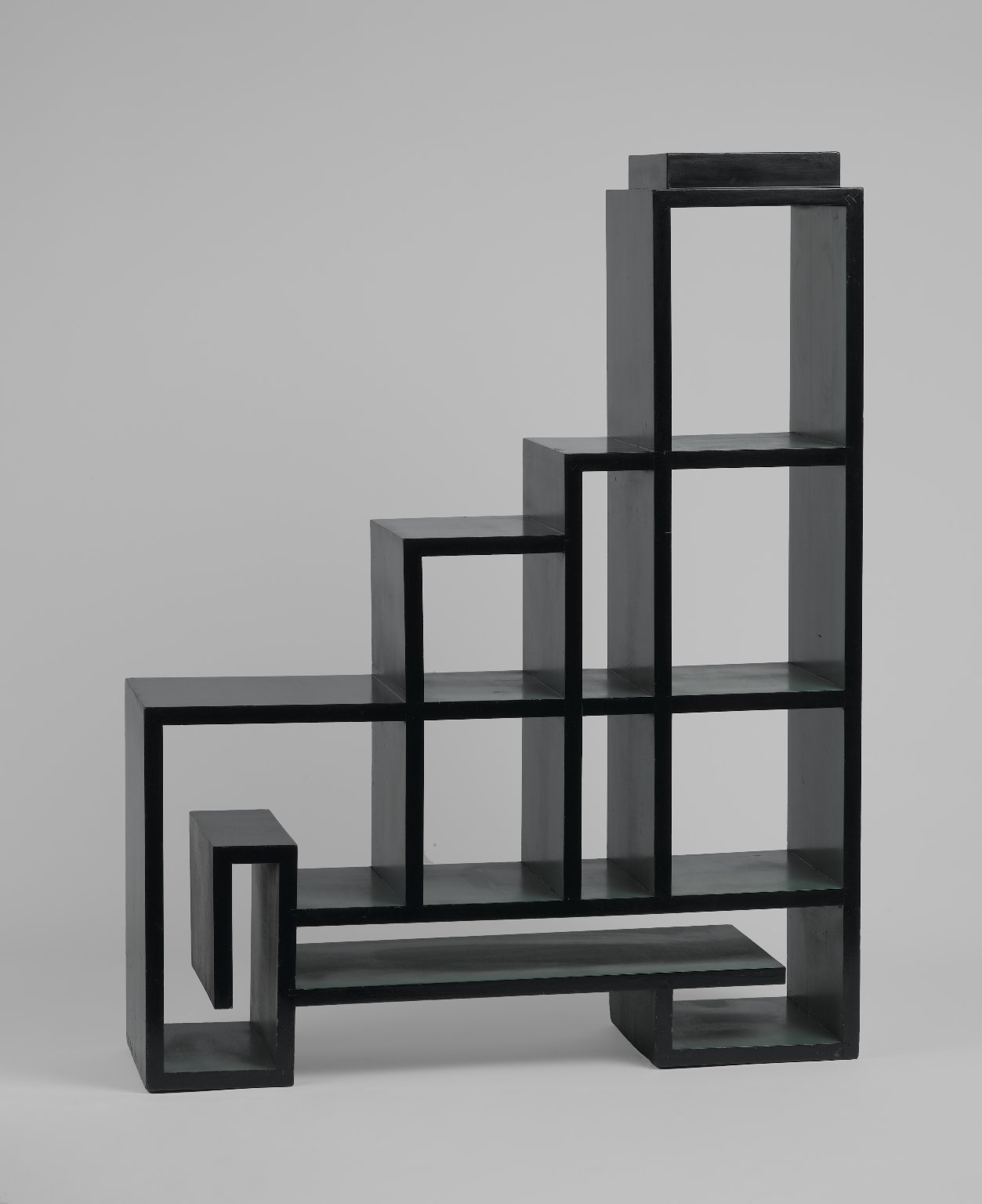
Paul T. Frankl. "Skyscraper" Step Table, late 1920s Brooklyn Museum

Frankl had a competitive edge over US architects who stuck to the principles of Revivalism architecture. In the 1920s Frankl embraced modernist European design ideas and found himself among a small group of Austrian and German designers , who in some cases maintained workshops and showrooms in New York City. Rena Rosenthal and Edward H. Aschermann not only sold modern interior and industrial design in New York City, they also fabricated in the city. They were joined by Winold Reiss, Ilonka Karasz, Joseph Urban, and William Lescaze, while Kem Weber established modernist interior design on the US West coast. Frankl set up his architectural practice in New York City and was commissioned to design film sets. As Frankl struggled financially, he had to accept commissions for interior designs. In the 1920s, Frankl introduced his celebrated skyscraper style (before turning to metal furnishings in the 1930s). Frankl opened Frankl Galleries on 48th Street, calling his company Skyscraper Furniture, which became an epicenter of American modernism, including modern textiles and wallpapers imported from Europe.

His solo art shows included New York City's Knoedler Gallery in 1931 and Los Angeles's Stendahl Gallery in 1944.

After he relocated to Los Angeles and opened a gallery on Rodeo Drive in Beverly Hills, celebrities such as Fred Astaire, Cary Grant, Katharine Hepburn, Walter Huston and Alfred Hitchcock became clients.

Frankl wrote several books and magazine articles about the Modern Style and was its most vocal proponent. He established the American Union of Decorative Artists and Craftsmen (AUDAC) in 1928. He later designed production pieces for Brown Saltman of California and Johnson Furniture Company of Grand Rapids, incorporating an early use of biomorphic designs and novel materials such as cork veneer. His style continuously evolved, from early skyscraper furniture to relaxed and casual designs favored by the Hollywood elite in the 1930s to manufactured pieces for the mass market in the 1950s. In 1934 he moved to Los Angeles where he taught at the University of Southern California and the Chouinard Art Institute. Used, out-of-print books he authored sell for hundreds of dollars in online bookstores.

His daughter, Paulette Frankl, is an artist, author and photographer, and his grandson, Nicholas Koenig, is a creative director for theme parks and interactive games.

== Books ==
- New Dimensions: the Decorative Arts of Today in Words and Pictures, 1928.
- Form and Re-form: A Practical Handbook of Modern Interiors, 1930 (reprint 1975).
- Machine-made leisure, 1932.
- Space for living: Creative interior decoration and design, 1938.
- Principios fundamentales de la historia de la arquitectura, Leipzig y Berlín, 1914.

== Collections ==
- Brooklyn museum of art.
- San Francisco Museum of Modern Art.
- Art Institute of Chicago.
- Milwaukee Art Museum.
- Philadelphia Museum of Art.
- Metropolitan Museum of Art.
- Grand Rapids Art Museum.
