= SiPort shooting =

Shooting in California, United States

2008 SiPort murders
- Location: Santa Clara, California, United States
- Date: November 14, 2008; 18 years ago 3:00 p.m. (PST UTC−08:00)
- Attack type: Shooting
- Weapon: 9mm caliber handgun
- Deaths: 3
- Injuries: 0
- Perpetrator: Jing Hua Wu
- Motive: Termination of employment
- Verdict: Wu convicted

On November 14, 2008, three people were fatally shot at the office of SiPort, a start-up company in Santa Clara, California. Jing Hua Wu was arrested and convicted.

== Shooting ==
SiPort CEO Sid Agrawal, human resources manager Marilyn Lewis, and vice president of operations Brian Pugh were all shot fatally in the head. It was one of the deadliest workplace killings in Silicon Valley history.

== Perpetrator ==
Wu (born 1961) was born in China, and was a former employee of SiPort. He was distraught over losing his job at the company.

== Legal proceedings ==
Jing Hua Wu was charged with three counts of first-degree murder and special circumstances of using a firearm, and was represented by high-profile defense attorney Tony Serra. On March 8, 2013, Wu was found guilty of all charges. On August 2, 2013, Wu was sentenced to life imprisonment without the possibility of parole, and an additional 75 years.

== See also ==
- List of homicides in California
