= Korean American Journalists Association =

American professional organization

The Korean American Journalists Association (KAJA) was founded in 1987, but the organization for professional journalists of Korean-American descent or journalists who specialize in Korean- or Asian-American issues fell dormant. A new incarnation of KAJA was begun in 2005.

== Origin ==
Several Korean-American reporters – pioneers among Asian-American journalists – founded the Korean American Journalists Association, or KAJA, in 1987. They held an inaugural gathering at Arirang restaurant in New York City. KAJA was born from the discussions at that meeting. KAJA's founding officers and their KAJA titles: K.W. Lee of The Sacramento Union, president; K. Connie Kang, legal affairs reporter of the San Francisco Examiner, vice president; Kapson Yim Lee, a veteran of Korean ethnic media, including the Korea Times newspaper, secretary/treasurer; and T.S. Suhr of Los Angeles, a journalist-turned-lawyer, who joined KAJA's board of directors and helped draw up its bylaws. The other charter members were Chong Wha Pyen of The Ann Arbor News and Jae Hoon Ahn of The Washington Post.

Over time, as the leadership entered their 60s and 70s, KAJA became dormant, until a younger generation took up the reins and rebooted KAJA.

== Rebirth ==
In 2005, four Korean-American journalists, Jinah Kim of KNBC/NBC, Eleanor Hong of washingtonpost.com, HyunJu Chappell Hine of The Washington Post, and Carolyn Ayon Lee, a veteran wire-service writer and editor, sought to reactivate KAJA. They realized that KAJA's mission, to accurately portray Korean-Americans, Koreans and Korea in mainstream United States media, was still of vital importance, and that this role was not being filled by other similar organizations, such as the Asian American Journalists Association, with which KAJA maintains a little sister-big sister relationship.

These journalists were sparked by the legacy of the 1992 Los Angeles riots. The North Korea-South Korea dynamic was growing tense, amidst U.S. President George W. Bush’s categorization of North Korea as part of an "axis of evil."

With the help of Grace Jang of KoreAm Journal and Ariana Eunjung Cha of The Washington Post, this small group of Korean-American journalists organized a daylong conference on October 29, 2005, in Los Angeles at the Korean Cultural Center. Its focus was North Korea media coverage and issues.

Calvin Sims, a longtime foreign correspondent for The New York Times, delivered the keynote address to the audience of members of the Korean-American community and local journalists. Excerpts of Sims' documentary, Nuclear Nightmare: Understanding North Korea, were screened. Filmmaker Jim Butterworth presented his award-winning Seoul Train – which has been shown in venues all over the world, including broadcast on the U.S. Public Broadcasting System stations, except South Korea.

== See also ==
- Journalists Association of Korea – largest press association in South Korea
