= Korean Journalists' Union =

North Korean journalist organization

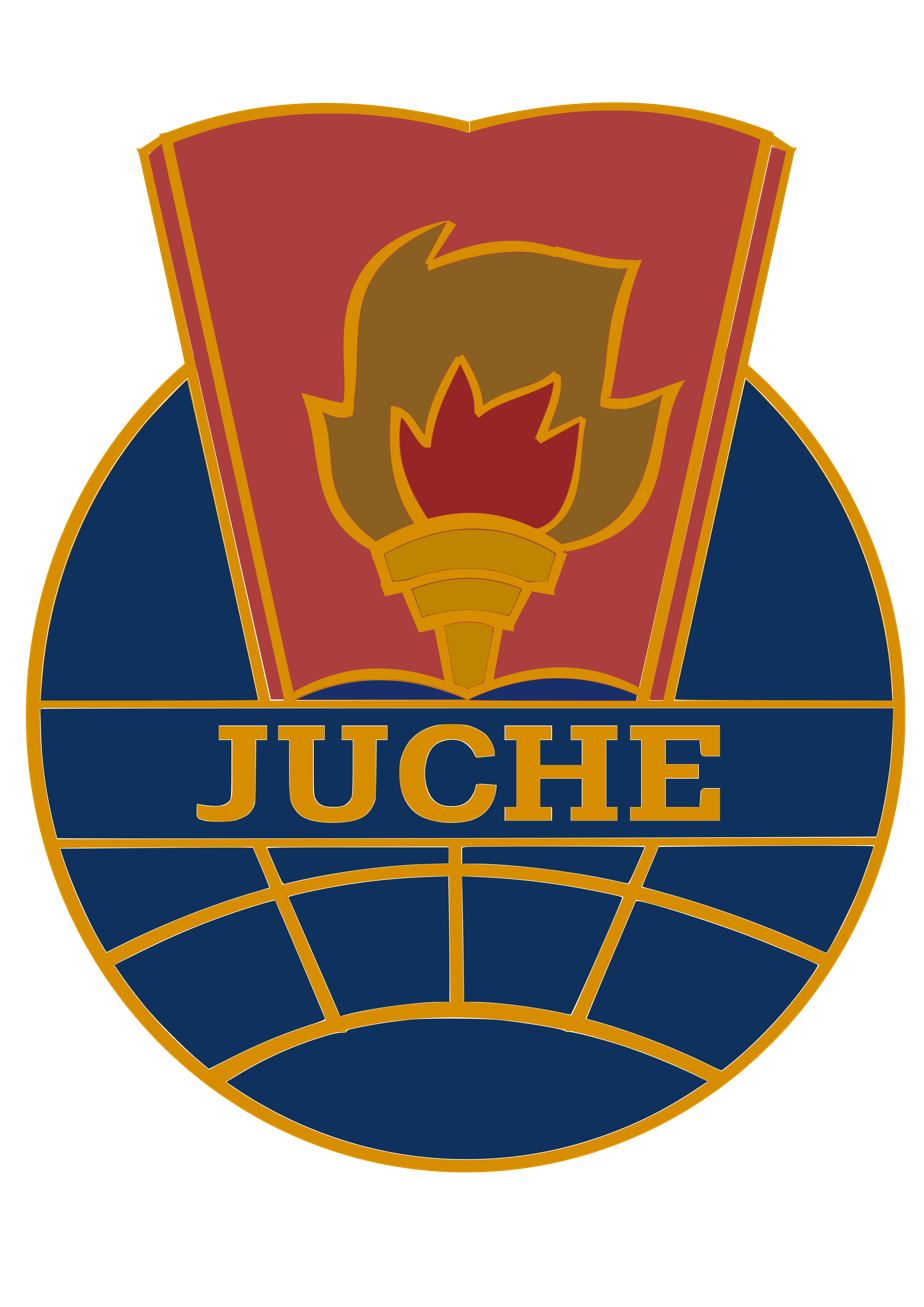
- Founded: 11 October 1946
- Headquarters: Pyongyang
- Location: North Korea
- Key people: Chairman of the Central Committee Cha seung soo
- Publication: Journalists' Anthology

- Korean Journalists' Union
- Hangul: 조선기자동맹
- Hanja: 朝鮮記者同盟
- RR: Joseon gija dongmaeng
- MR: Chosŏn kija tongmaeng

The Korean Journalists' Union (Korean: 조선기자동맹) is a North Korean organization for journalists. Founded on 11 October 1946. It is considered an important institution of the country. Membership is mandatory for all North Korean journalists. The union is led by its central committee. It is based in the capital, Pyongyang. The union has published its journal, Journalists' Anthology (기자작품집) since 1960.

The union was a member of the now-defunct International Organization of Journalists.

Spokesman of the Korean Friendship Association, Alejandro Cao de Benós, was certified an honorary journalist of the union in 2008.

== History ==
After its foundation in 1946, the first National journalist conference was held in a youth club in Pyongyang and the second conference was held in the Moranbong club in 1957. The third conference was held in the party conference room in 1968, and conference was held at the People's Palace of Culture in 1979

It was a member of the Democratic Front for the Reunification of Korea until its dissolution in 2024.

== List of historic heads of the central committee ==
- Lee Sung bok(1985–)
- Hyon chun guk(–1995)
- Kim chol myong
- Kim Song Guk(2001-Before 2007)
- Choi Chilnam(2007-sometime before 2013)
- Hwang Yongbo(before 2013–2014)
- Cha seung soo(2014–)

== See also ==
- Media of North Korea
- Journalists Association of Korea – a journalists' association in South Korea
