= Journalists Association of Korea =

Professional association in South Korea

The Journalists Association of Korea (JAK; Korean: 한국기자협회; Hanja: 韓國記者協會) is a professional association for journalists based in South Korea. It was founded on August 17, 1964, in response to a press law (언론윤리위원회법) at the time. According to the organization's website as of March 2024, it has over 10,000 members, and is the largest such organization in the country.

Its finances are covered by membership dues and special grants it receives. It has training and educational programs for journalists, and tries to improve and critique journalistic standards.

The organization has conducted studies and surveys on journalists and their wellbeing.

It is part of the International Federation of Journalists. It also publishes a number of its own publications. It issues the yearly Korea Journalist Award, and monthly Award for Journalist of the Month.

== See also ==
- Korean American Journalists Association – for the United States
- Korean Journalists' Union – for North Korea
