= True Believer (film) =

1989 film by Joseph Ruben

- Theatrical release poster
- Directed by: Joseph Ruben
- Written by: Wesley Strick
- Produced by: Lawrence Lasker; Walter F. Parkes
- Starring: James Woods; Robert Downey Jr.; Yuji Okumoto; Margaret Colin; Kurtwood Smith
- Cinematography: John W. Lindley
- Edited by: George Bowers
- Music by: Brad Fiedel
- Distributed by: Columbia Pictures
- Release date: February 17, 1989
- Running time: 108 minutes
- Country: United States
- Language: English
- Box office: $8.7 million

True Believer (also released as Fighting Justice) is a 1989 American neo noir courtroom drama directed by Joseph Ruben, written by Wesley Strick, and starring James Woods, Robert Downey Jr., Yuji Okumoto, Margaret Colin, and Kurtwood Smith.

The film is loosely based on an investigative series of articles written by Pulitzer Prize-nominated journalist K. W. Lee on the wrongful conviction of immigrant Chol Soo Lee for a 1973 San Francisco Chinatown gangland murder. The news coverage led to a new trial, eventual acquittal and release of the prisoner from San Quentin's Death Row. Strick based the character of Eddie Dodd on real-life Bay Area defense attorney Tony Serra.

== Plot summary ==
Eddie Dodd is a burnt-out attorney who has left behind civil rights work to defend drug dealers. Roger Baron is an idealistic young legal clerk, fresh out of law school, who encourages Dodd to take on the case of Shu Kai Kim, a young Korean man who was imprisoned for a gang-related murder committed in New York's Chinatown eight years ago, and has now killed a fellow inmate in self-defense. Kim's mother believes her son was wrongfully accused in the gang-related murder.

Dodd and Baron's investigation leads to a conspiracy among District Attorney Reynard, police informant Art Esparza, and police officers Sklaroff, Dennehy and Montell. Dodd gets permission from the judge to put Reynard on the stand. Reynard had been an assistant district attorney leading a major Colombian crime syndicate case, and protected the true murderer – Esparza – by having Sklaroff, Dennehy and Montell frame Kim in order to continue the Colombian case. During Dodd's forceful questioning, Dennehy – who is dying of cancer – enters the court and sits with Dodd's team; Reynard admits the truth of the conspiracy, knowing that Dennehy has clearly revealed the true facts to Dodd. Kim is released from prison.

== Cast ==
- James Woods as Eddie Dodd
- Robert Downey Jr. as Roger Baron
- Margaret Colin as Kitty Greer
- Yuji Okumoto as Shu Kai Kim
- Kurtwood Smith as Robert Reynard
- Charles Hallahan as Vincent Dennehy
- Miguel Fernandes as Art Esparza
- Graham Beckel as Sklaroff
- Tony Haney as Montell
- Tom Bower as Cecil Skell
- Sully Diaz as Maraquilla Esparza
- Luis Guzmán as Ortega

== Reception ==
Strick's screenplay was nominated for a 1990 Edgar Award for Best Mystery Motion Picture. Film critic Roger Ebert commended Woods's performance for being "hypnotically watchable."

At the time of True Believer's release, K. W. Lee told the Charleston Gazette he enjoyed the film "as fiction...but it was not a true picture. They have completely preempted the struggle of Asians."

True Believer inspired a spin-off television series, Eddie Dodd, starring Treat Williams in the title role.

The film holds a rating of 96% on Rotten Tomatoes from 23 reviews.

== Home media ==
The film was released on Blu-ray in the United States by Mill Creek Entertainment on August 13, 2019.
