= Chol Soo Lee =

Korean American exoneree

Chol Soo Lee (이철수)
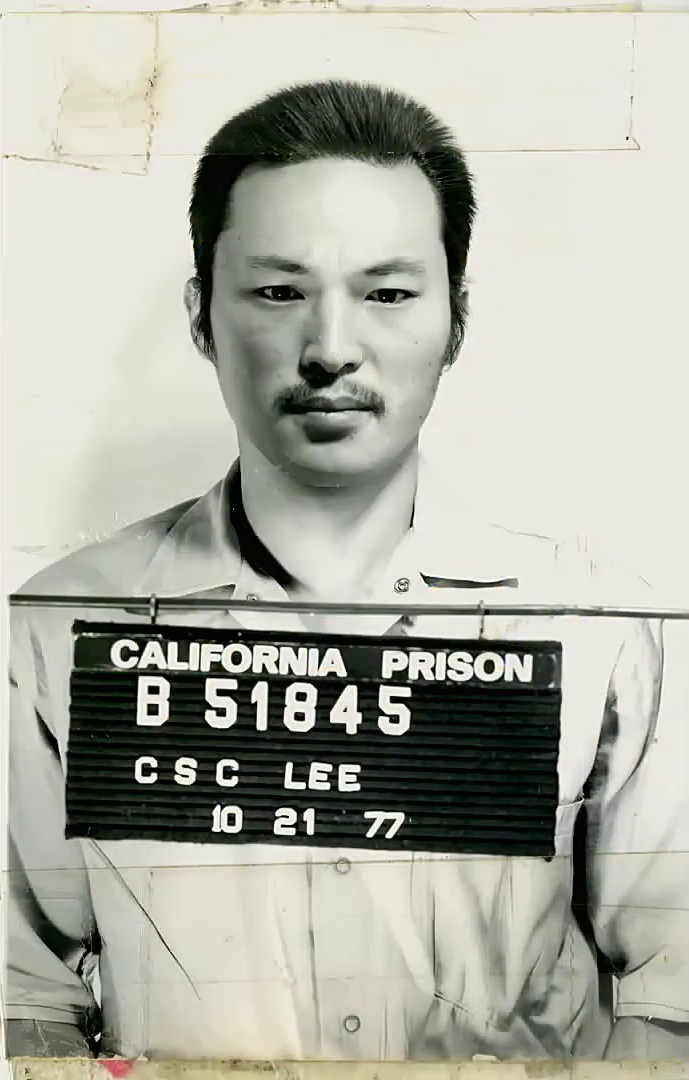
- 1977 mugshot of Lee
- Born: August 15, 1952; Seoul, South Korea
- Died: December 2, 2014 (aged 62); San Francisco, California, U.S.
- Known for: 1983 exoneration from 1973 death sentence murder conviction

Chol Soo Lee (August 15, 1952 – December 2, 2014) was a Korean American immigrant who was wrongfully convicted for the 1973 murder of Yip Yee Tak, a San Francisco Chinatown gang leader, and sentenced to life in prison. While in prison, he was sentenced to death for the killing of another prisoner, Aryan Brotherhood member Morrison Needham, though Chol Soo claimed self-defense. Chol Soo served ten years of his sentence for the killing of Yip Yee Tak, of which he was later acquitted, four of those on death row. Investigative reporting by K. W. Lee sparked the formation of the Free Chol Soo Lee Defense Committee, which spurred a national pan-Asian movement. Chol Soo finally won his freedom in 1983 through the help of the Free Chol Soo Lee Defense Committee and Tony Serra.

== Early life, family and education ==
Lee was born in Seoul, Korea, in 1952, the son of a Korean woman who was raped and abandoned by her family. His mother then married a US soldier and emigrated to America, leaving Lee with an aunt and uncle. In 1964 she returned to Korea to bring her twelve-year-old son to the US.

Not speaking English or having parents to guide him, he had a difficult life. The San Francisco public school system and juvenile authorities declared that Lee was mentally disturbed by 1965, diagnosing him as an adolescent schizophrenic and committing him to the McAuley Institute at St. Mary's Medical Center after a suicide attempt while being held at juvenile hall. He was later admitted to Napa State Hospital in March 1966 for three months, then transferred to a foster home in Hayward after being declared sane.

Lee ran away from his foster home in October 1966; after he was picked up by authorities, he served a 13-month sentence with the California Youth Authority starting in the summer of 1967, leaving him with limited education and experience in America outside of detention facilities and mental hospitals.

Lee was arrested on June 7, 1973, for the murder of Yip Yee Tak. At the time, Lee was under probation from a charge of grand theft from a person; he had pleaded guilty in December 1971 and was sentenced to 180 days in county jail and three years' probation in January 1972. The probation portion of his sentence started on June 5, 1972.

=== Murder of Yip Yee Tak ===
Chinatown, San Francisco

Tak, a youth advisor for the Wah Ching organized crime organization, was gunned down in the early evening of Sunday, June 3, 1973, as part of the continuing gang war between the Wah Ching and Joe Boys. Tak was shot at the intersection of Pacific and Grant, near the Ping Yuen Housing Projects. According to an eyewitness, Tak was shot from behind; after Tak fell, the killer ran east along Pacific, downhill towards Columbus.

Shortly afterward, police responded to the scene at approximately 8:10 pm (17 minutes before sunset), and an unrecorded witness pointed out the empty five-shot .38 Special revolver used by the killer had been discarded in Beckett Alley, where it was recovered. Five witnesses were taken to the police station to view mugshots; three had witnessed the shooting, and two saw a man wearing the clothing described by the first three witnesses moving away from Pacific and Grant; all five were white males. Lee's photograph was among the mugshots selected by the witnesses as the potential gunman, but the mugshot of Lee that was picked dated to 1969. A subsequent autopsy recovered .38 caliber bullets from Tak's body. The .38 Special had been taken during a robbery of the Sun Sing Theater in Chinatown. Ballistic comparison to rounds test fired indicated the .38 Special recovered from Beckett Alley was the murder weapon.

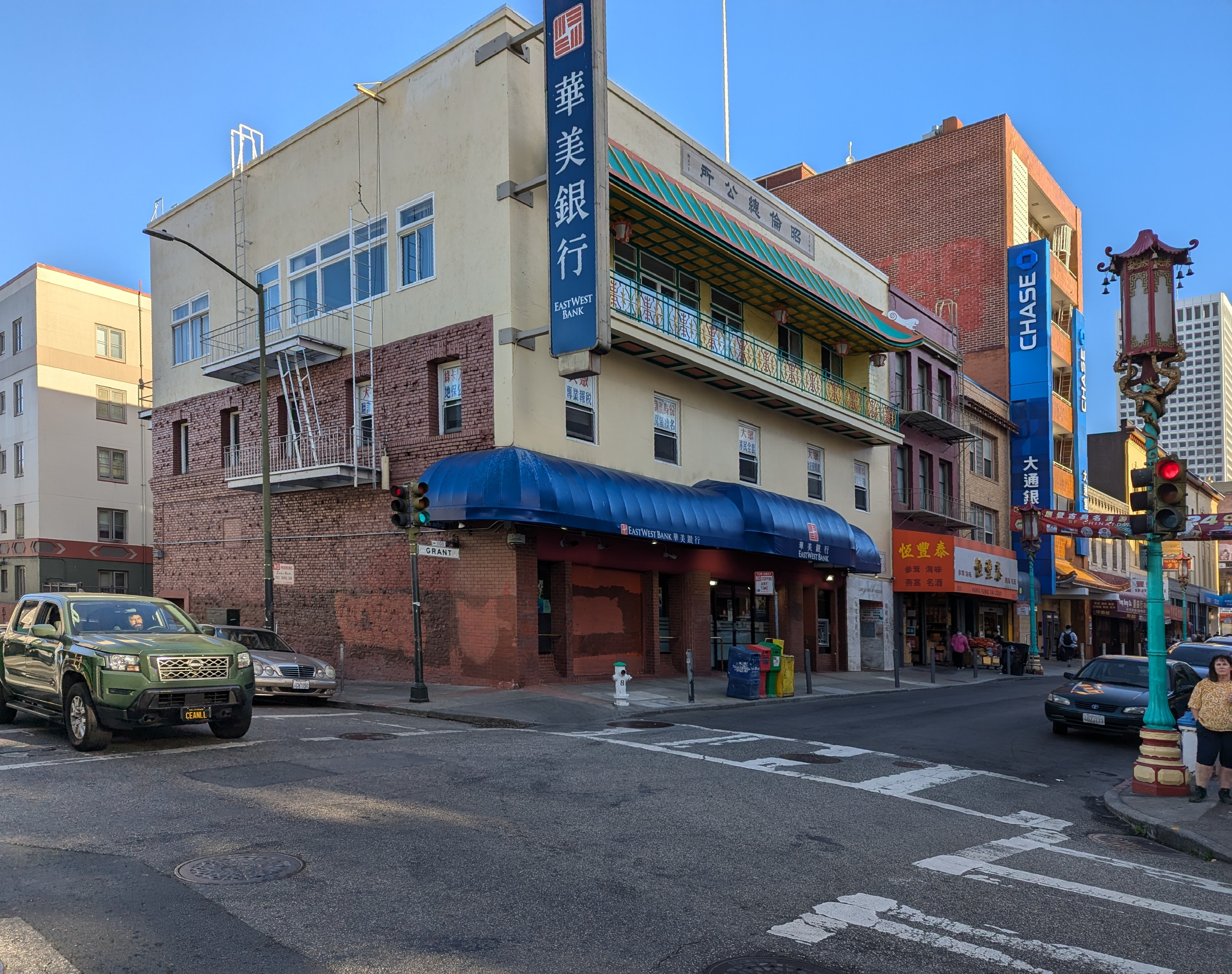
View southeast towards the southeast corner of Pacific & Grant (2024); Pacific slopes downhill towards the left of the photograph, and Beckett is between the bank building in the foreground and Ping Yuen in the background.

The day before Tak was killed, police officers responded to reports of gunfire at an apartment on Broadway rented by Lee; they removed a bullet from the wall facing the window of Lee's apartment. Lee was arrested at approximately 11:00 pm on June 7 as he returned to his apartment. At the time of his arrest, Lee was carrying a Colt Python .357 revolver and had 41 rounds of .38 caliber ammunition in his pocket. According to the arresting plainclothes officer, as Lee was being handcuffed, he said "Go ahead and kill me. I would be rather off — I would be better off." Lee testified he made the statement after being whipped across the nose with the bag of .38 caliber bullets. During the drive to the Hall of Justice, Lee added "You guys are always picking me up. Last time it was robbery. this time it's murder. And I was just going home [to Korea] tomorrow." According to Lee, after he was advised again of his rights at the Hall of Justice and requested a lawyer, Inspectors Frank Falzon and Jack Cleary told him that if his story checked out, he would be released and would not need an attorney, which is when Falzon and Cleary began recording their conversation.

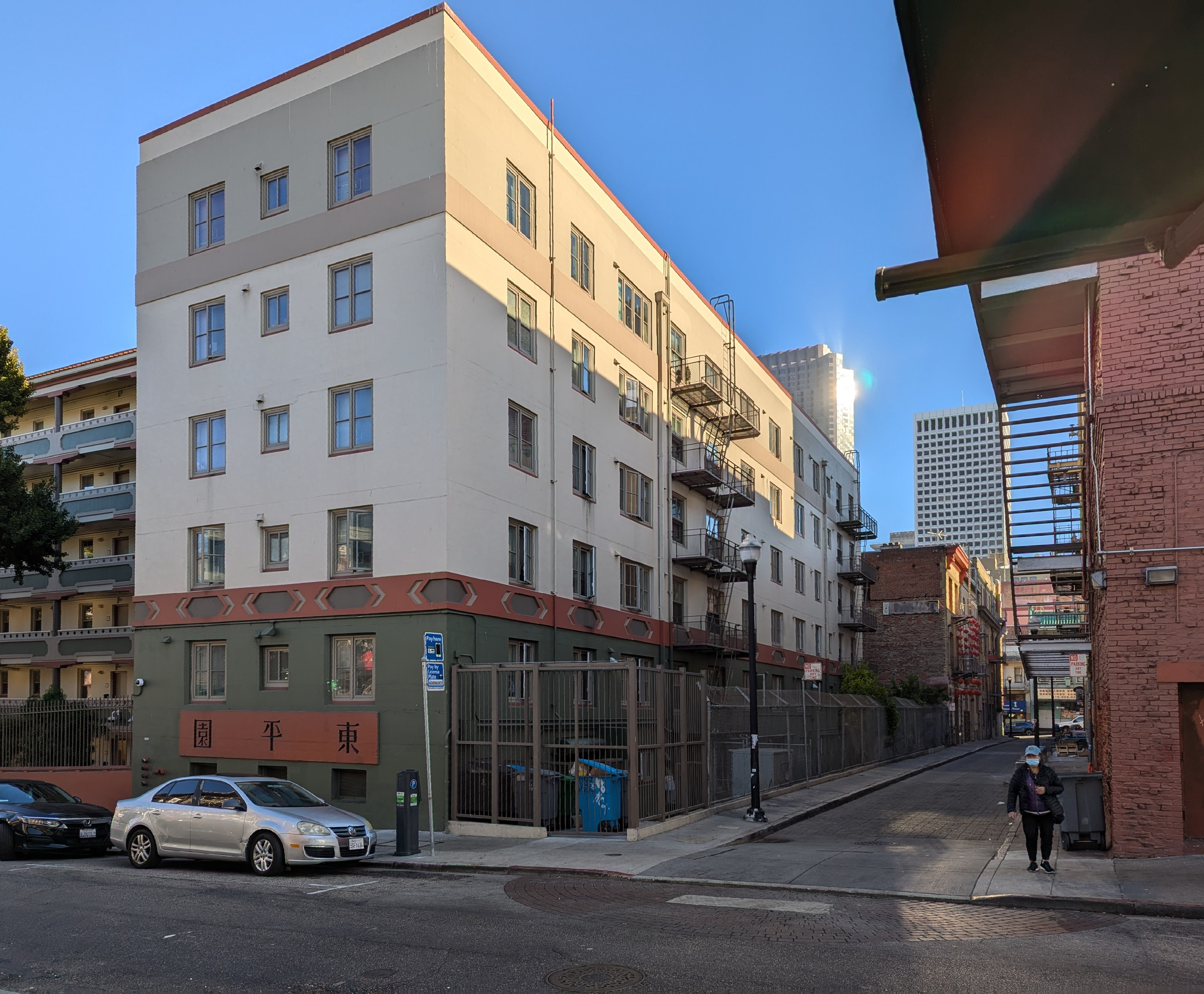
View south along Beckett towards Jackson from Pacific (2024)

Placed in a lineup on June 11, three of the five witnesses picked out Lee as the killer; however, of the mugshots identified by the witnesses shortly after the shooting, only Lee was brought into the lineup. A SFPD criminologist tied the bullet recovered from the wall across from Lee's apartment with the purported murder weapon on June 15, but later recanted after an independent criminologist proved they did not match; when pressed, the SFPD criminologist stated he had made "a contrary conclusion because he felt it was necessary to obtain a conviction."

Clifford Gould, a public defender from the San Francisco Public Defender's Office, was appointed to Lee's defense in June 1973 after Lee's arrest, but withdrew after the trial venue was moved to Sacramento; Lee was subsequently assigned Hamilton Hintz, a public defender from Sacramento, on April 2, 1974. The San Francisco Public Defender's Office had filed a motion for discovery on August 30, 1973, and followed up with a motion for a change of venue on September 4; the trial court granted the motion for discovery and denied the change of venue, but was overruled by the Appeal Court on February 13, 1974, which issued an order to grant the change of venue. However, the Public Defender's Office realized the change of venue would not aid their client and asked to withdraw the change of venue motion on March 21, which was denied even though the hearing to investigate the feasibility of a change of venue had not yet been held.

Hintz accepted the assignment contingent on assistance from the San Francisco Public Defender's Office, which never materialized. Although the San Francisco Public Defender's Office was provided with the names of witnesses who could provide an alibi for Lee's whereabouts at the time of the shooting, that office failed to follow up with those witnesses, and they were never contacted to provide statements and were no longer available to testify by the time the trial began on June 3, 1974. Mr. Hintz was later faulted for ineffective counsel, as he had called Inspector Frank Falzon as a defense witness and asked Falzon if he knew of any motive why Tak was killed; Falzon seized the opportunity to create a series of incriminating statements at Lee's trial. The trial court was also faulted for not allowing Lee to withdraw the "coercive change of venue". In addition, key evidence was not provided to Lee's defense attorneys during discovery, including alternative theories for the motive, the existence of percipient witnesses, that some witnesses may have seen the killer exit a tan Cadillac several minutes prior to the shooting, and that some police reports and polygraph results supported Lee's innocence.

Inspector Falzon testified that he believed Lee was a gun for hire paid by the Wah Ching to kill Tak after Tak had misappropriated funds from the gang. Several of the potential gunmen in the police lineup were members of the Wah Ching. Falzon's partner, Inspector Jack Cleary, first broached the subject of the "Ski Mask Bandits" during his testimony on June 11, 1974. Some members of the "Ski Mask Bandits" had been arrested in Reno in May 1973 for a bank robbery; Lee was also arrested in Reno for possession of "bait money", marked bills that had been taken during the robbery. In addition, newspaper clippings about the "Ski Mask Bandits" were recovered from Lee's room. The conviction was won in part on the damning testimony of Falzon, who had been invited by the defense to testify about his "knowledge of a motive as to why Mr. Yip Yee Tak was killed"; in the writ of habeas corpus, the San Joaquin Public Defender's Office later stated the defense "counsel had no purpose in 'opening the door' to the rumors, rank gossip, prior arrests, suggestive affilitations, and other grossly prejudicial and patently inadmissible evidence which poured into the case [during Falzon's testimony]. When Deputy District Attorney Lassart completed his 'cross-examination' of Inspector Falzon, the defense lay in shards." Lee testified that he had met his girlfriend at the Fairmont Hotel after her shift ended, at approximately the same time the shooting occurred; the pair walked back to Chinatown via Stockton and ate at a restaurant at Jackson and Grant before returning to his apartment at approximately 11 pm. He said the gunshot on June 2 had occurred while he was cleaning the gun.

Lee was convicted of first-degree murder on June 19 and was sentenced to life imprisonment on July 10. His conviction was upheld by the Court of Appeal, Third Appellate District on April 30, 1975. Lee served his sentence at Deuel Vocational Institution in Tracy, California.

=== Publicity and Defense Committee ===
Alerted by young Asian American supporters of Chol Soo Lee from San Francisco about his innocence, investigative reporter K. W. Lee from The Sacramento Union embarked on a six-month investigation in June 1977, into what became known as the "Alice in Chinatown Murder Case". On October 8, 1977, Lee killed Morrison Needham, a member of the Aryan Brotherhood, in a prison yard altercation. Lee, who claimed self-defense, was charged with murder with special circumstances because of his earlier murder conviction, which calls for the death penalty.

The first of two articles by K. W. Lee appeared in The Sacramento Union on January 29, 1978. It questioned the verdict in the murder of Tak.

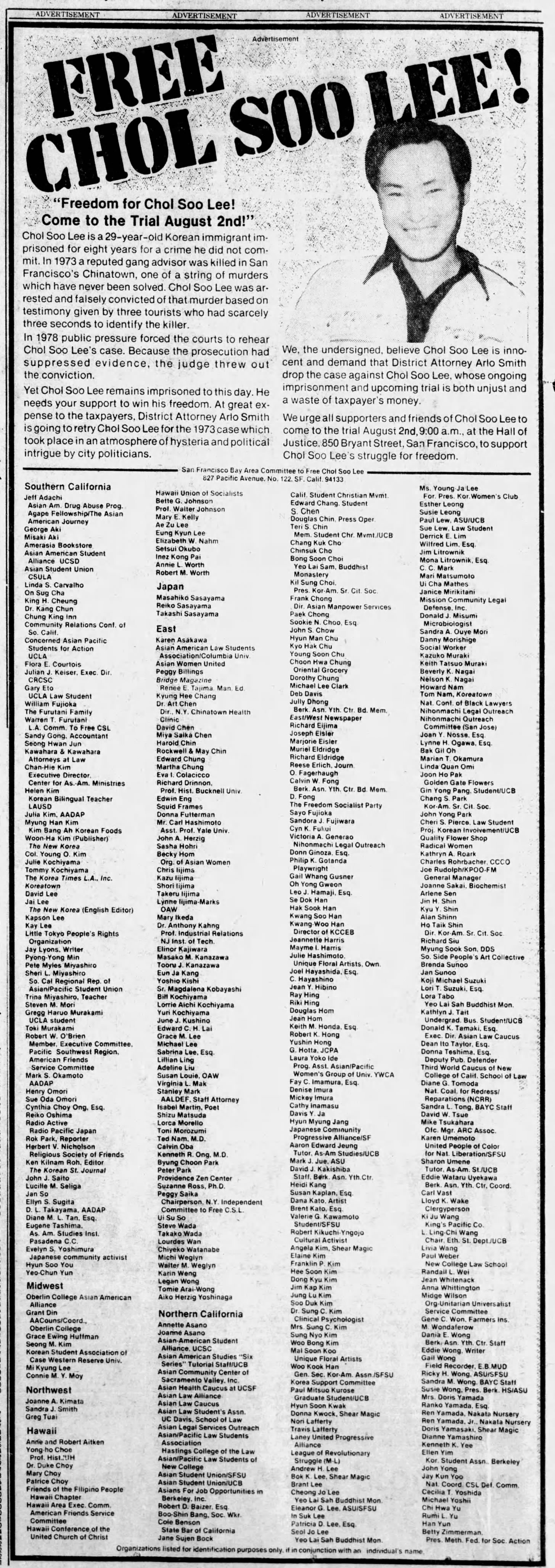
A 1982 ad by the San Francisco Bay Area Committee to Free Chol Soo Lee calling for his freedom

The continuing investigative series prompted a local drive to form the first Chol Soo Lee Defense Committee, organized as a pan-Asian effort by then law school graduate Jay-gun Yoo (유재건) and Davis, California, school teacher Grace Kim in Sacramento, third generation Japanese American college student Ranko Yamada, and third-generation Korean Americans Gail Whang and Brenda Paik Sunoo in the San Francisco Bay Area. The defense committee grew into a grassroots coalition of activists determined to raise awareness, funds, and resources to overturn Lee's sentence. The movement became one of the first waves in American history to build organized support around a shared Asian American identity. After Lee's exoneration, he publicly stated that he was "very grateful that [his] case has become an educational experience for the Asian community".

=== Retrial and exoneration ===
Lee filed a petition for a writ of habeas corpus in July 1978, alleging that key evidence had been suppressed at his first trial. Lee was not aware of the remedy of habeas corpus due to his limited education and experience until he was provided an attorney from the San Joaquin County public defender's office on October 18, 1977, following his arraignment for the stabbing of Needham.

One of the key pieces of evidence that was not disclosed by the prosecution during discovery was a police report filed by Inspector Falzon dated June 6, 1973; in that report, which directly rebutted Falzon's unsourced assertion that Tak's death was a contract killing and therefore first-degree murder, three alternative theories were advanced for Tak's killing, including that Tak was a suspect in three rapes. In addition, the police report of June 6 included a statement from a confidential informant that asserted that just before Tak was killed, he was seen having coffee with another person before apparently reaching some sort of agreement and then arguing.

The habeas hearing was held in 1978, and granted in February 1979. Meanwhile, Lee was tried and convicted for first-degree murder relating to the stabbing death of Needham, and was sentenced to death in May 1979. Following the death sentence, Lee was transferred to San Quentin State Penitentiary. On appeal, the habeas grant was upheld by the Court of Appeals for the Third District in March 1980 and the conviction for the first trial was set aside. The prosecution then moved to retry the murder of Tak.

On 21 July 1980, Leonard Weinglass was confirmed as Chol Soo Lee's court-appointed defense attorney. In February 1982, Lead defense attorney Leonard Weinglass withdrew, and Tony Serra and Stuart Hanlon joined the defense team.

On August 11, 1982, the retrial of the first case began, and on September 3, 1982, the San Francisco County Superior Court jury acquitted Lee of the murder of Yip Yee Tak, and its foreman joined the Chol Soo Lee Defense Committee. On January 14, 1983, California's 3rd District Court of Appeal nullified Chol Soo Lee's death sentence for the Needham stabbing, citing the Stockton trial judge's incorrect jury instructions, and for allowing hearsay testimony in the death penalty phase of the trial.

San Joaquin County Superior Court Judge Peter Saiers ordered Chol Soo Lee to be released on March 28, 1983, after Lee's supporters pledged property worth twice the amount of the $250,000 bail. However, the prosecution moved to retry Lee on the prison killing charge. Lee's co-counsels were able to secure a guilty plea for second degree murder in the Needham case. Lee, who had served nearly ten years in prison, was given credit for time served and freed from prison.

=== Later life ===
Lee never received an apology or compensation from the state. He lived the rest of his life in San Francisco.

While he was wrongfully convicted, Lee often admitted that he was "not an angel on the outside, but, at the same time ... was not the devil." Lee and a friend were hired to burn down a house belonging to Peter Chong in 1991; the arson went awry, leaving Lee with third-degree burns over 90% of his body. Lee subsequently testified against Chong after those who had hired him for the arson failed to pay. He was later arrested for the arson and sentenced to three years probation after pleading guilty.

In the midst of numerous speaking engagements, Lee shared his story with Bay Area youth, stressing the importance of engaging with the Asian American community. He also drafted an autobiography entitled Freedom without Justice, which was completed after his death by University of California at Davis professor Richard S. Kim.

Chol Soo Lee died on December 3, 2014, in San Francisco from complications of a gastric disorder. He was 62 years old.

== Legacy ==
The 1989 film True Believer is loosely based on Lee's retrial and acquittal, and the character of Shu Kai Kim in the film (played by Yuji Okumoto) is based on Lee, the character of Eddie Dodd in the film (played by James Woods) is based on Tony Serra.

Jeff Adachi joined Lee's defense committee while Adachi was attending college and credits the case with sparking his eventual pursuit of a career in law.

Free Chol Soo Lee, a documentary, was screened in January 2022 as part of the Sundance Film Festival. The film was directed and produced by Julie Ha and Eugene Yi, and produced by Oscar-Nominated producer Su Kim. Producer Su Kim received the 2022 Sundance Institute/Amazon Studios Producers Award for Nonfiction Features for her work on the documentary. It was selected by The Better Angels Society as the runner-up for the 2021 Library of Congress Lavine/Ken Burns Prize for Film. It won Outstanding Historical Documentary at the 45th Annual News and Documentary Emmy Awards in 2024.

== See also ==
- List of wrongful convictions in the United States
