= Tony Serra =

American lawyer (born 1934)

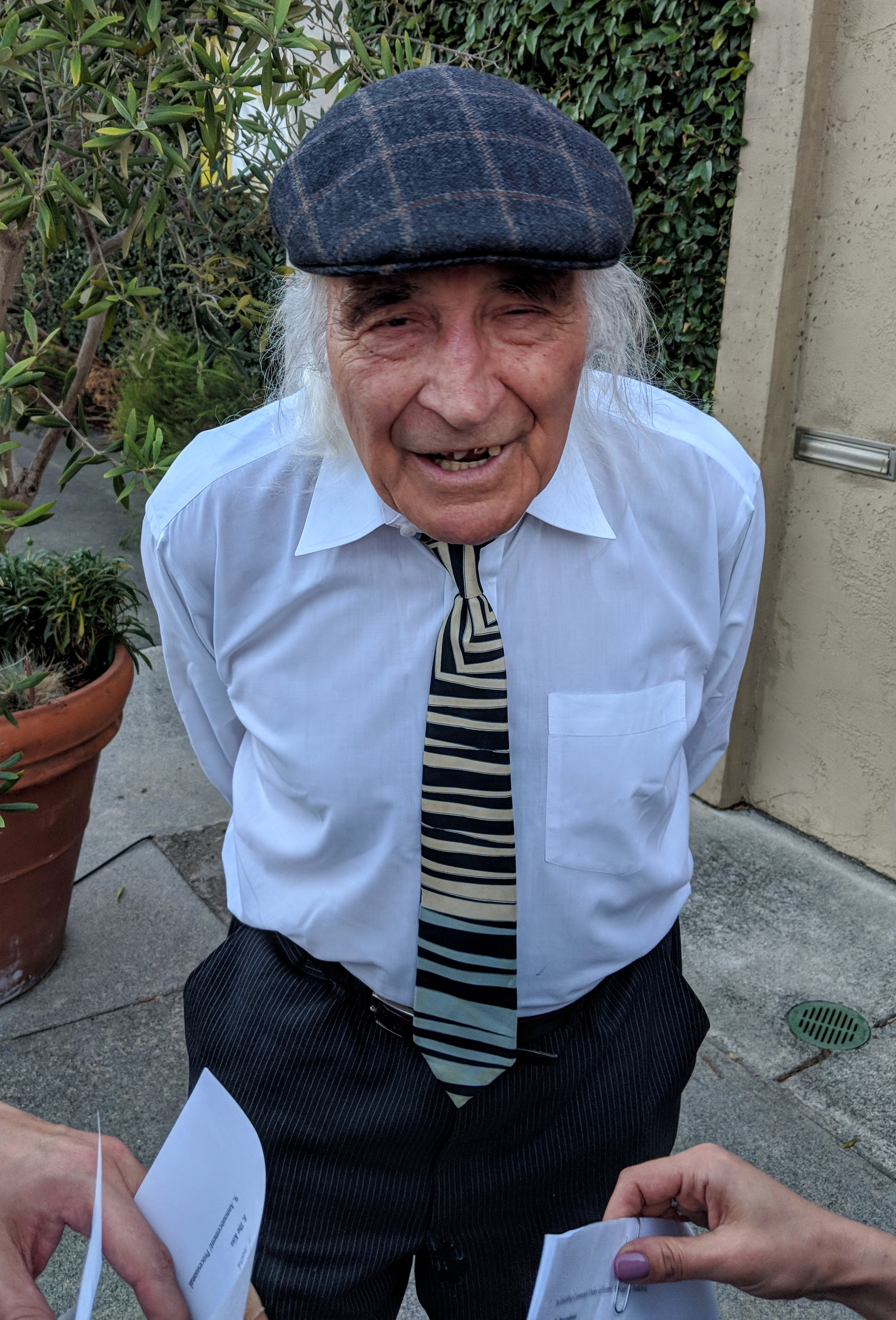
- Serra in 2018
- Born: Joseph Tony Serra; December 30, 1934 (age 91); Alameda County, California, U.S.
- Education: Stanford University (BA); University of California, Berkeley (JD)
- Occupation: Attorney
- Partner: Mary Edna Dineen
- Children: 5

Joseph Tony Serra (born December 30, 1934) is an American retired criminal defense and civil rights attorney, political activist, and tax resister from San Francisco.

== Early life and education ==
A San Francisco native, Serra was raised in the Outer Sunset district. His father, Anthony Serra, was a Spanish immigrant from Mallorca who worked in a jelly bean factory, and his mother, Gladys (Fineberg) Serra was a Russian Jewish immigrant from Odessa; she died by suicide in 1977.

Serra earned a Bachelor of Arts degree in Philosophy from Stanford University and a Juris Doctor degree from Boalt Hall at the University of California, Berkeley. While in law school, Serra was a contributor to the California Law Review.

== Career ==
In 1970, Serra successfully defended Black Panther leader Huey Newton in a murder trial.

In 1983, Serra won an acquittal for Chol Soo Lee, a Korean American immigrant in San Francisco who had been convicted of murder in 1973, and sentenced to life imprisonment.

He has also represented individuals from groups such as White Panthers, Hells Angels, Good Earth, and New World Liberation Front (NWLF). Some of these individuals include Brownie Mary, Dennis Peron, Patrick "Hooty" Croy, Ellie Nesler, and Symbionese Liberation Army member Sara Jane Olson.

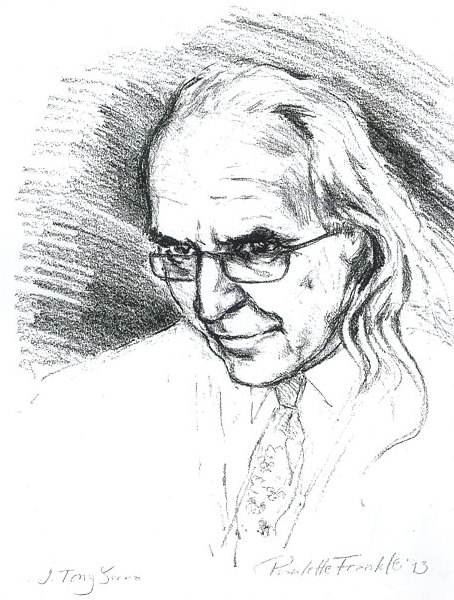
Courtroom sketch of Serra

In 1988 his California license to practice law was suspended for one month and he was placed on five years of probation following an earlier tax-related conviction.

In 2002, Serra was sanctioned by the State Bar of California for disclosing the addresses and phone numbers of two police witnesses in a court document for Sara Jane Olson’s Los Angeles bombing plot trial.

In 2003, Serra was awarded the Trial Lawyer of the Year award by the organization Trial Lawyers for Public Justice for his successful litigation of Judi Bari against the FBI.

In 2004, Serra won an acquittal during a retrial on murder charges for co-defendant Rick Tabish in the death of casino mogul Ted Binion.

In 2006, Serra's license to practice law in California was suspended for one year, and he was placed on a probationary period for two years, connected to his failure to pay income taxes.

In 2015, he defended Chinatown crime boss Raymond "Shrimp Boy" Chow.

In July 2025, after 63 years of law practice, Serra retired at 90 years of age and, on July 1, 2026, his license to practice law in California was suspended and he was placed on involuntary inactive status, including for failure to pay bar fees and noncompliance with continuing education requirements.

A biography of Serra, Lust for Justice: The Radical Life and Law of J. Tony Serra, written by courtroom artist Paulette Frankl and with a foreword by criminal defense attorney Gerry Spence, was released in October 2010.

== Tax resistance ==
Serra has been in trouble with the law several times for failure to pay income taxes. He refused to pay taxes in protest of the War in Iraq based on his conviction that the Bush administration was leading the country in the wrong direction and that he would, therefore, not contribute any money to fund what he saw as Bush's corrupt politics. On July 29, 2005, he was sentenced to 10 months in federal prison, to be served at Lompoc, California, and ordered to pay $100,000 in restitution for a misdemeanor conviction of willful failure to pay taxes.

In 2006, Ephraim Margolin and Douglas L. Rappaport represented Serra against the State Bar of California when he faced action for failing to file a tax return. His license to practice law in California was suspended for one year, and he was placed on a probationary period for two years. Serra was released from the federal camp in February 2007, reporting immediately to a San Francisco halfway house. He was released from federal custody, and the halfway house, on March 13, 2007, after finishing his sentence. Along with three other attorneys, Serra filed a class-action lawsuit seeking minimum wages for himself and for other inmates, citing slave wages as unconstitutional.

== Personal life and family ==
Serra has taken a vow of poverty and is known for living a frugal lifestyle and driving a run-down car. He does not have a cell phone, a bank account, or a credit card. In a disciplinary hearing before the State Bar of California, Serra stated, "I took an informal vow of poverty. I vowed that I would never take profit from the practice of law, that I would not buy anything new, that I would recycle everything, that I would own no properties - no stocks or bonds, no images of prosperity. I still drive an old junk of a car. I still barely make the rent each month; I have accumulated nothing by way of savings, and I live from hand to mouth."

Serra has five children with Mary Edna Dineen.

Serra has two younger brothers including the late Richard Serra, a prominent sculptor. Richard paid for the college educations of Serra's five children.

== In popular culture ==
The 1989 film True Believer was loosely based on the 1982–83 retrial of Chol Soo Lee. The film's main character, Eddie Dodd, played by James Woods, is based on Serra. Serra said at the time of the film's release that he was unconcerned with the great difference between his actual unchanged countercultural commitments and the misleading portrait of his screen character as a cynical burned-out Sixties casualty. The film inspired a spin-off series, Eddie Dodd, which ran for six episodes in 1991 on ABC; Dodd was played by Treat Williams.

== High-profile cases ==
- Derick Almena, Ghost Ship warehouse fire
- Greg Anderson (Barry Bonds's trainer), BALCO
- Judi Bari and Darryl Cherney v. FBI
- Michael Bortin, Symbionese Liberation Army
- Brownie Mary
- Raymond "Shrimp Boy" Chow
- George Christie, Hells Angels
- Rod Coronado, Earth Liberation Front
- Patrick "Hooty" Croy
- Chol Soo Lee
- Eugene Allon "Bear" Lincoln
- Russell Little, Symbionese Liberation Army
- Ellie Nesler
- Huey Newton
- Sara Jane Olson, Symbionese Liberation Army
- Rick Tabish, Las Vegas Ted Binion case
- Sudi "Pebbles" Trippet
- Jing Hua Wu, SiPort shooting
- Black Panthers
- New World Liberation Front
- White Panthers
