= K. W. Lee =

American journalist (1928–2025)

Kyung Won Lee
- Born: 이경원; June 1, 1928; Kaesong, Korea, Empire of Japan
- Died: March 8, 2025 (aged 96); Sacramento, California, U.S.
- Education: West Virginia University; University of Illinois
- Occupations: Investigative reporter; editor
- Employers: Kingsport Times-News; Charleston Gazette; Sacramento Union; Koreatown Weekly; The Korea Times; ColorLines Magazine
- Children: 3
- Website: www.kwleecenter.org

Kyung Won Lee (Korean: 이경원; June 1, 1928 – March 8, 2025) was an American journalist who worked for mainstream daily publications in the continental United States. Lee was also the founding president of the Korean American Journalists Association.

== Early life and education ==
Lee was born in 1928 in Kaesong, Korea, Empire of Japan and attended Korea University in Seoul, South Korea.

In 1950, he immigrated to the United States, where he studied journalism at West Virginia University.

After receiving a master's degree from the University of Illinois in 1955, he worked for daily newspapers such as the Kingsport Times-News in Tennessee, and the Charleston Gazette in West Virginia.

In 1960, he married Peggy Flowers of Bluefield, Virginia.

He worked for many years for the Sacramento Union in California, where he oversaw investigative reporting and an internship program.

He won awards from the National Headliners Club, the AP News Executive Council, and the Columbia University Graduate School of Journalism.

== Career ==
Lee covered the civil rights struggles in the South in the early 1960s, massive vote-buying practices in southern West Virginia, and the plight of Appalachian coal miners. Lee is best known for writing an investigative series on the conviction of immigrant Chol Soo Lee for a 1973 San Francisco Chinatown gangland murder which became the basis of the 1989 film True Believer, starring James Woods and Robert Downey Jr. His series of 120 articles over five years led to a new trial, eventual acquittal and release of the prisoner from San Quentin's Death Row.

In 1979, Lee founded the Koreatown Weekly, the first national English-language Korean American newspaper. In 1990, during rising tensions between African Americans and Korean Americans, he launched and edited The Korea Times English Edition from Los Angeles, with an internship program for Asian Americans and other minorities.

== Personal life and death ==
Lee was also a survivor of liver and stomach cancer. In 1992, Lee underwent a liver transplant. He lost both of his parents and all six of his siblings to hepatitis B-induced liver disease.

After entering semi-retirement, Lee lectured on investigative journalism in communities of color in the University of California system. He also continues to serve on the editorial board of ColorLines Magazine and has freelanced as a columnist for Currents, The Korea Times Bi-lingual Edition, Korean Quarterly and KoreAm Journal. He had three children with his wife Peggy. As of 2010, he was residing in Sacramento.

Lee died at his home in Sacramento, California, on March 8, 2025, at the age of 96.

== Honors and recognition ==
- In 1968, he received the Urban Service Award from the U.S. Office of Economic Opportunity for outstanding coverage of the poor.
- In 1979, he was awarded first place for Best Series of Articles by the California Newspaper Publishers Association.
- In 1987, he was the first recipient of the Asian American Journalists Association's Lifetime Achievement Award.
- In 1992, he was presented the John Anson Ford Award by the Human Relations Commission of L.A. County.
- In 1994, he became the first Asian journalist to receive the Free Spirit Award from the Freedom Forum.
- In 1997, he was inducted into the Newseum's Journalism History Gallery in Arlington, VA.
- In 2000, he was profiled in Crusaders, Scoundrels, Journalists: The Newseum's Most Intriguing Newspeople.
