= Rowan (restaurant) =

Restaurant in Portland, Oregon, U.S.

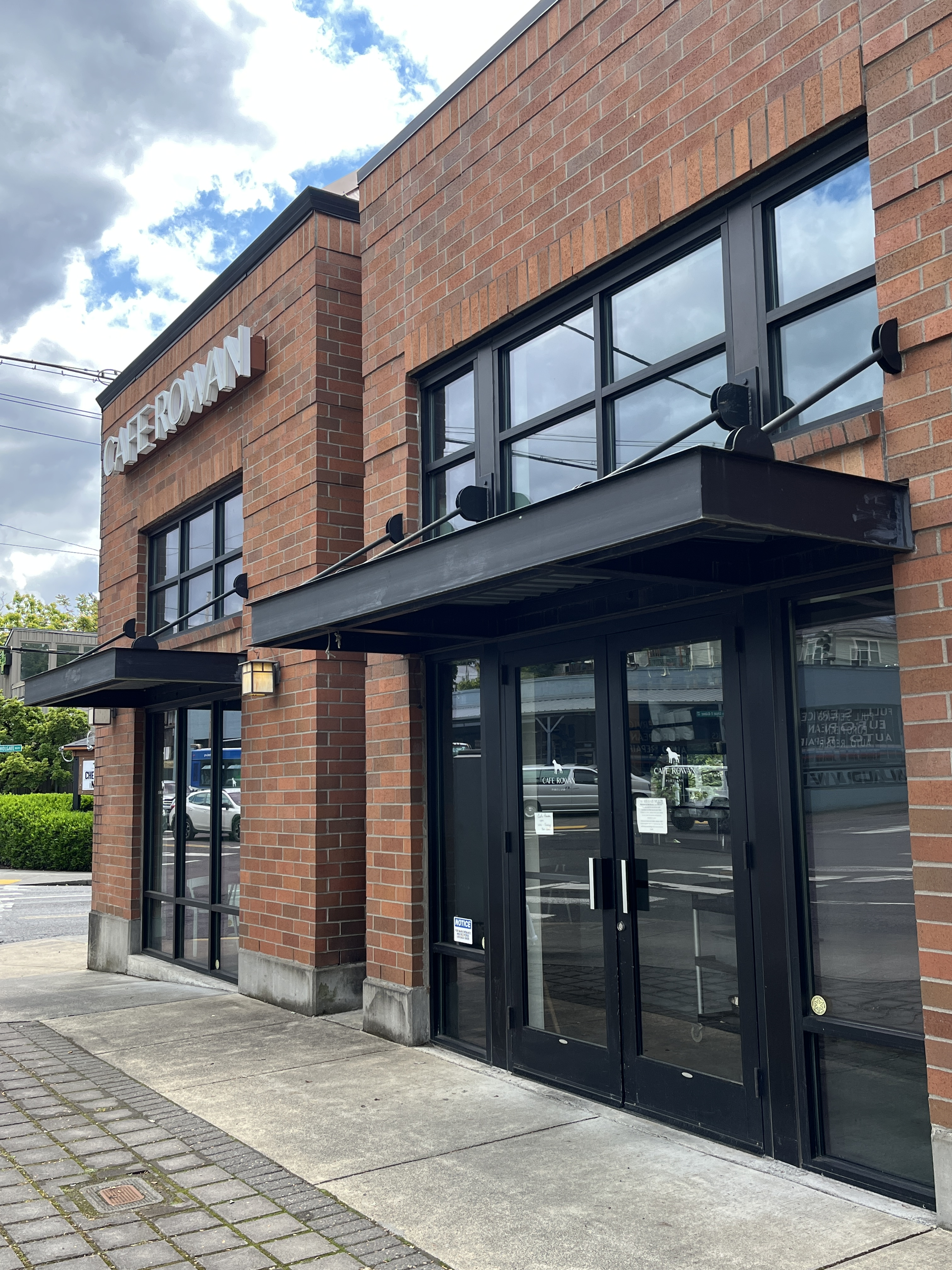
- The restaurant's exterior, 2025
- Interactive map of Rowan

Restaurant information
- Established: 2020
- Owner: Spencer Ivankoe
- Location: 4437 Southeast César E Chávez Boulevard, Portland, Multnomah, Oregon, 97202, United States
- Coordinates: 45.4904°N 122.6230°W
- Website: caferowan.com

Rowan, formerly Cafe Rowan, is a farm-to-table restaurant in Portland, Oregon, United States. Owner Spencer Ivankoe opened the restaurant on Campesinos Boulevard in southeast Portland's Creston-Kenilworth neighborhood in 2020, during the COVID-19 pandemic. It started with brunch service and launched a dinner menu in 2023. It has garnered a positive reception as a brunch destination.

== Description ==
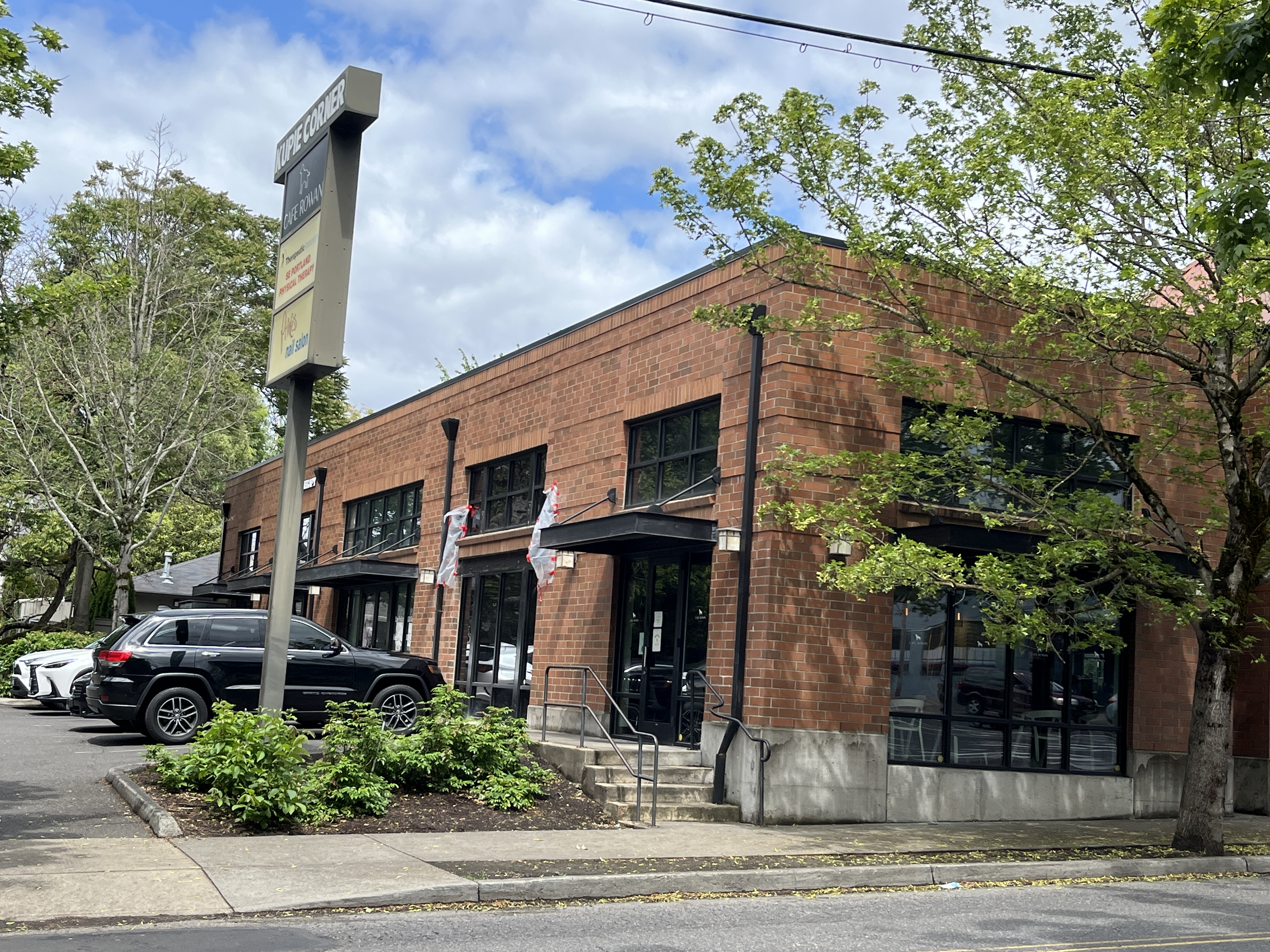
The restaurant's exterior in 2025

The farm-to-table restaurant Rowan operates on Campesinos Boulevard (formerly César E Chávez Boulevard) at Holgate Boulevard in southeast Portland's Creston-Kenilworth neighborhood at the boundary with the Woodstock neighborhood. The Portland Mercury has described the restaurant as "a bright space with an open kitchen that serves some supremely photogenic dishes". It has a seating capacity of 42 people, as well as outdoor seating. The patio is dog-friendly. The business is named after the owner's Labrador Retriever.

=== Menu ===
Brunch is served Wednesdays through Sundays. The menu includes variations of Eggs Benedict with Dungeness crab or Maine lobster, as well as French toast with bananas foster. Breakfast burritos have chorizo, roasted garlic potatoes, scrambled eggs, salsa macha, salsa verde, and cilantro-lime crema. The restaurant has also served cheddar grits with blackened shrimp, bacon-shallot jam, and Calabrian chili oil. Among breakfast sandwiches is the Dame, which has breakfast sausage, fried egg, manchego, gochujang, and Mama Lil's aioli. The bacon, egg and cheese sandwich has blueberry jam. Among toasts is The Avocado, which has spring peas, watermelon radish, and tahini with Meyer lemon. Rowan has also served Connecticut-style lobster rolls. The lobster roll sampler has Dungeness crab, Maine lobster, and Oregon bay shrimp. Drink options include coffee and mimosas with grapefruit or orange juice.

The dinner menu has included kanpachi crudo with fennel pollen, pan con tomate with duck fat, prosciutto, and sea urchin. Drink options include cocktails and wine. Cafe Rowan has also offered pastries from the bakery Orange & Blossom.

== History ==
The restaurant's former logo, which had a figure of a Labrador Retriever

In October 2019, Eater Portland described owner Spencer Ivankoe's plans to open Rowan in early 2020, in a space previously used as a coffee shop by Starbucks. The website's Brooke Jackson-Glidden said the restaurant would be "complete with weekly prix fixe dinners, monthly Jazz brunches, and a wall of Oregon-specific sundries".

As of January 2020, the restaurant was slated to open in March. Like many restaurants, the business was impacted by the COVID-19 pandemic and operated via curbside pickup, take-out, and indoor dining at times. In 2021, Invakoe launched a dinner series with menus that rotated monthly and were paired with winemakers. In 2023, Eater Portland described the cafe's plans to formally launch dinner service. The restaurant was broken into in 2024. In 2026, Rowan was among local restaurants, community organizations, and other businesses that joined the "We Are Rip City" campaign in support of the Moda Center renovation project. In September 2026, Ivankoe announced plans for the restaurant to start dinner and table service, as well as reservations.

For Dumpling Week, Rowan has offered dumplings with Maine Lobster and shrimp, served in tom kha broth with coconut milk, fish sauce, galangal, lemongrass, lime, and Thai chilis.

== Reception ==
Nathan Williams included Rowan in Eater Portland's 2023 overview of recommended restaurants in Creston-Kenilworth. Writers included the business in the website's list of Portland's eighteen best breakfast sandwiches, and Zoe Baillargeon included Rowan in a 2025 overview of the city's best breakfasts. Emily Hunt included Rowan in Tasting Table's 2025 list of Portland's eighteen best brunch restaurants. Rowan won in the "best restaurant" and "best brunch" categories of The Oregonian's Readers Choice Awards in 2025.
