= Dark cuisine =

Shock value cuisine

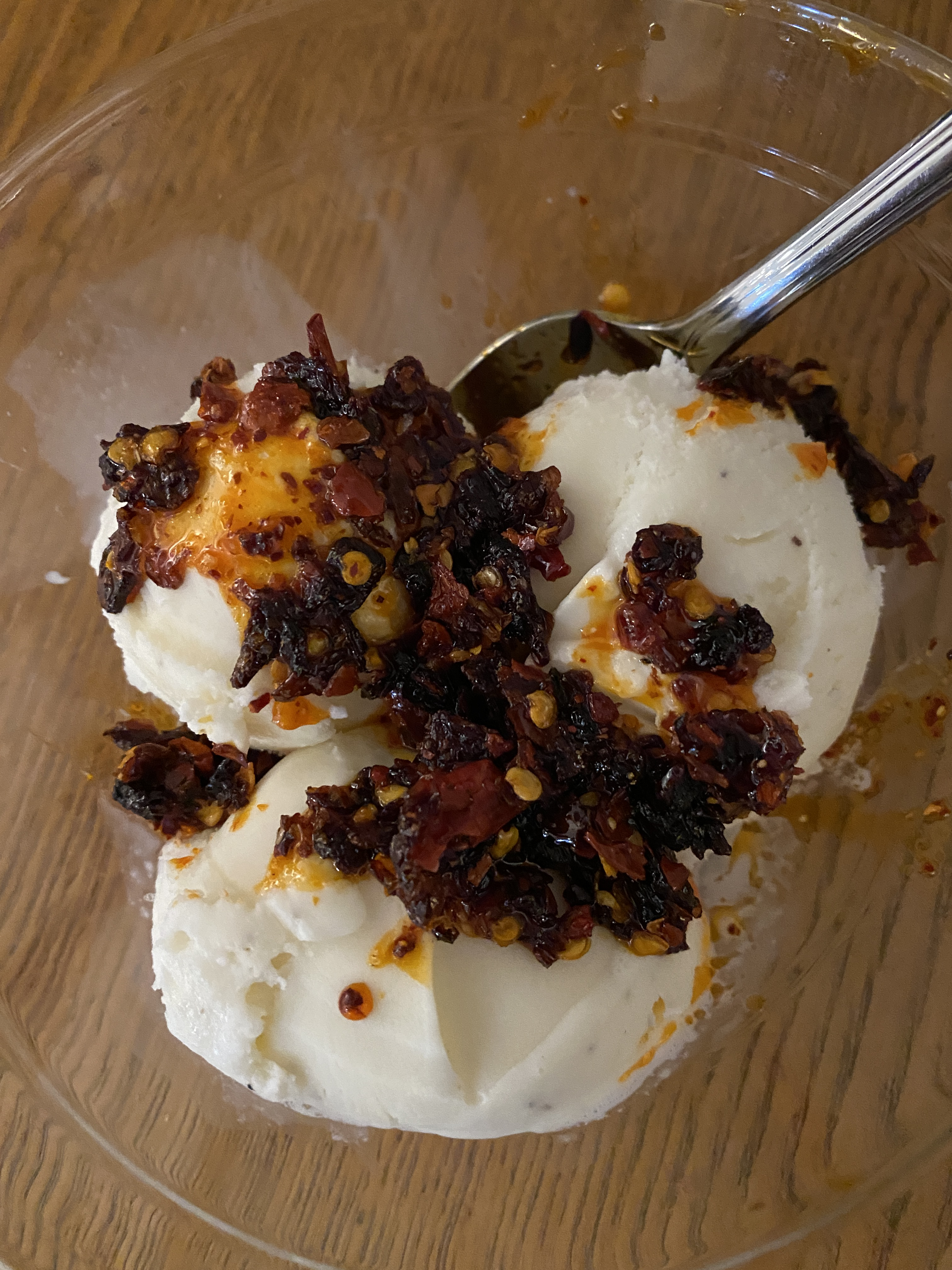
Vanilla ice cream topped with chili crisp

Dark cuisine or hei an liao li (Chinese: 黑暗料理; pinyin: hēi'àn liàolǐ) is a Chinese neologism referring to a culinary style built around foods or food combinations that sound bizarre or even disgusting but which often are tastier than anticipated.

== History ==
Dark cuisine typically sounds or looks bizarre or even disgusting but in some cases is more appealing than anticipated. The Chinese term hei an liao li dates from its use in Chuuka Ichiban!, or "China's Number One!", a 1990s manga series by Etsushi Ogawa, that follows a young chef in 19th-century China as he fights the Dark Cooking Society. In China the term had been used starting in 2012 to discuss stargazy pie, a Cornish dish that exemplified "all that the Chinese find baffling about Western cooking".

== Definition ==
According to food entrepreneur Jing (Jenny) Gao, the term can be used for "anything that's particularly hard to swallow," from ingredient combinations that make people feel squeamish to food produced under conditions of poor hygiene including in hole-in-the-wall restaurants in Chengdu that are so popular they "attract people like flies" and are called "fly" restaurants. "Absurd" combinations are common. Often dishes are posted to social media for their bragging rights or shock value.

== Examples ==
Examples include ice cream topped with chili crisp; a combination dreamed up by chef Christine Flynn of "Velveeta foam, spherified Gatorade and Doritos crushed into a decorative "soil"; and "struggle plates": documentation of home cooking disasters that the unfortunate cook ate anyway. Another commenter, after requesting "dark cuisine" combinations from her chef friends, listed sliced roast beef topped with blueberry yogurt, sausage with peanut butter and onions, and chili crisp peanut brittle.

== Related ==
Malmö, Sweden, hosts the Disgusting Food Museum which opened in 2018 and encourages visitors to "question what they find disgusting". American chef David Chang hosts a Netflix series called Ugly Delicious.
