= Chili crisp =

Spicy condiment made of chili peppers and garlic

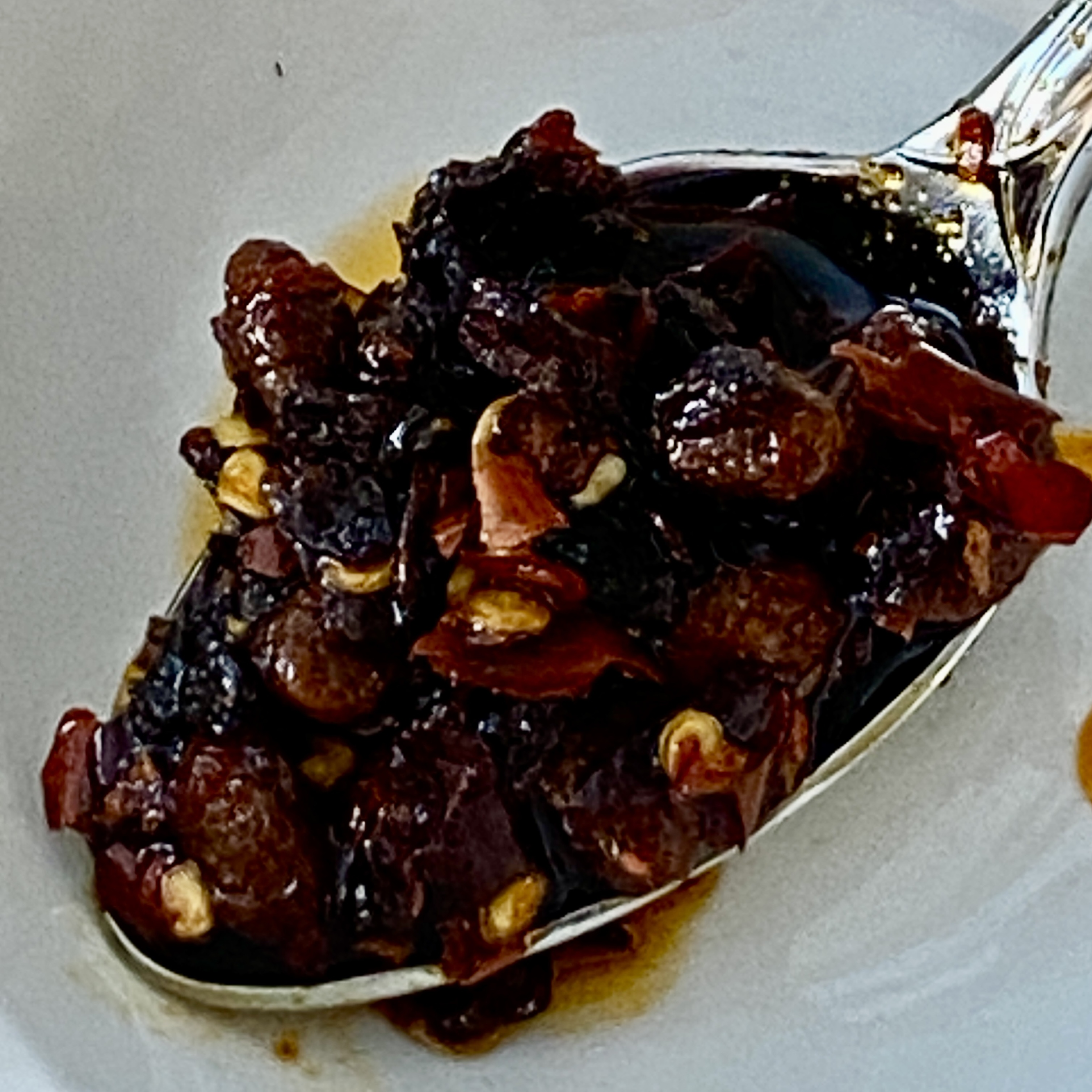
- Place of origin: China
- Main ingredients: chili pepper, soybean oil

Chili crisp or chili crunch (Chinese: 香辣脆; pinyin: Xiāng là cuì) is a type of hot sauce, originating from Chinese cuisine, made with fried chili pepper and other aromatics infused in oil, sometimes with other ingredients. Multiple regional, homemade, and restaurant-original versions exist across China. The best-known commercial brand is Lao Gan Ma, which is based on the chili crisps of Guizhou province. Chili crisp is closely related to Chinese chili oil, and sometimes the terms are used interchangeably, the difference being that the crisp contains edible chunks of food in the chili oil.

== History ==
Chili peppers, the key ingredient of chili crisp, were introduced to Asia as part of the Columbian exchange. Infused-oil hot sauce condiments have been made and used in China since then, and multiple regional variations have been developed. In southern China it is more common to simmer the ingredients in the oil, while in the north it is more common to pour hot oil over the ingredients. Households and restaurants developed their own versions, and in China "almost every restaurant makes their own", according to chef and restaurateur Lucas Sin.

In 1997, Chinese restaurateur Tao Huabi began the first commercial production of chili crisp in Guizhou under the Lao Gan Ma brand, which quickly became popular and eventually became a Chinese pantry staple. Although it was consumed by Chinese Americans, it was not widely known in the United States until the late 2010s and became particularly popular in the US during the coronavirus pandemic. The New York Times called it "a quarantine cooking need". The condiment has a fan base often described as "cult-like", referring to intense popularity.

As of 2024, David Chang's Momofuku holds the US trademark to the term "chile crunch" and has filed for protection for "chili crunch" as well. Later that year, Momofuku announced that they would no longer enforce the trademark after community backlash.

== Description and ingredients ==
Chili crisp is an oil-based condiment that contains crunchy bits of chili pepper, usually along with other spices such as garlic, onions, scallions, or other aromatics. It is related to chili oil and to chili sauce, and sometimes the terms are used interchangeably to refer to it. Chili crisp's proportions are such that the condiment contains much more crunchy bits than oil, which creates the texture of the condiment. It is typically not pourable like chili oils and chili sauces but instead is spooned over or stirred into dishes, and unlike chili oils and chili sauces it is not typically used in cooking but instead is added to foods before serving. Some recipes for chili oil call for making a chili crisp–like product, then straining out the solids.

Sichuan pepper is a common traditional ingredient. Canola oil or soybean oil are common bases. Vinegar, which is commonly used in hot sauces, is not an ingredient.

== Flavor profile ==
Chili crisp is savory, salty, spicy, and oily. Today described chili crisp as "a flavor bomb, incredibly nuanced, usually spicy, full of umami". The Los Angeles Times described the flavor as "the salty, crackly pleasure of potato chips with a just-right amount of tingling chile heat". New York magazine described it as "balanced the way sriracha is, only with more crunch and oomph". Chili crisps containing Sichuan pepper provoke an "intense heat and numbing sensation" typically associated with mala.

Besides the actual flavors, much of the appeal is often attributed to the texture.

== Uses ==
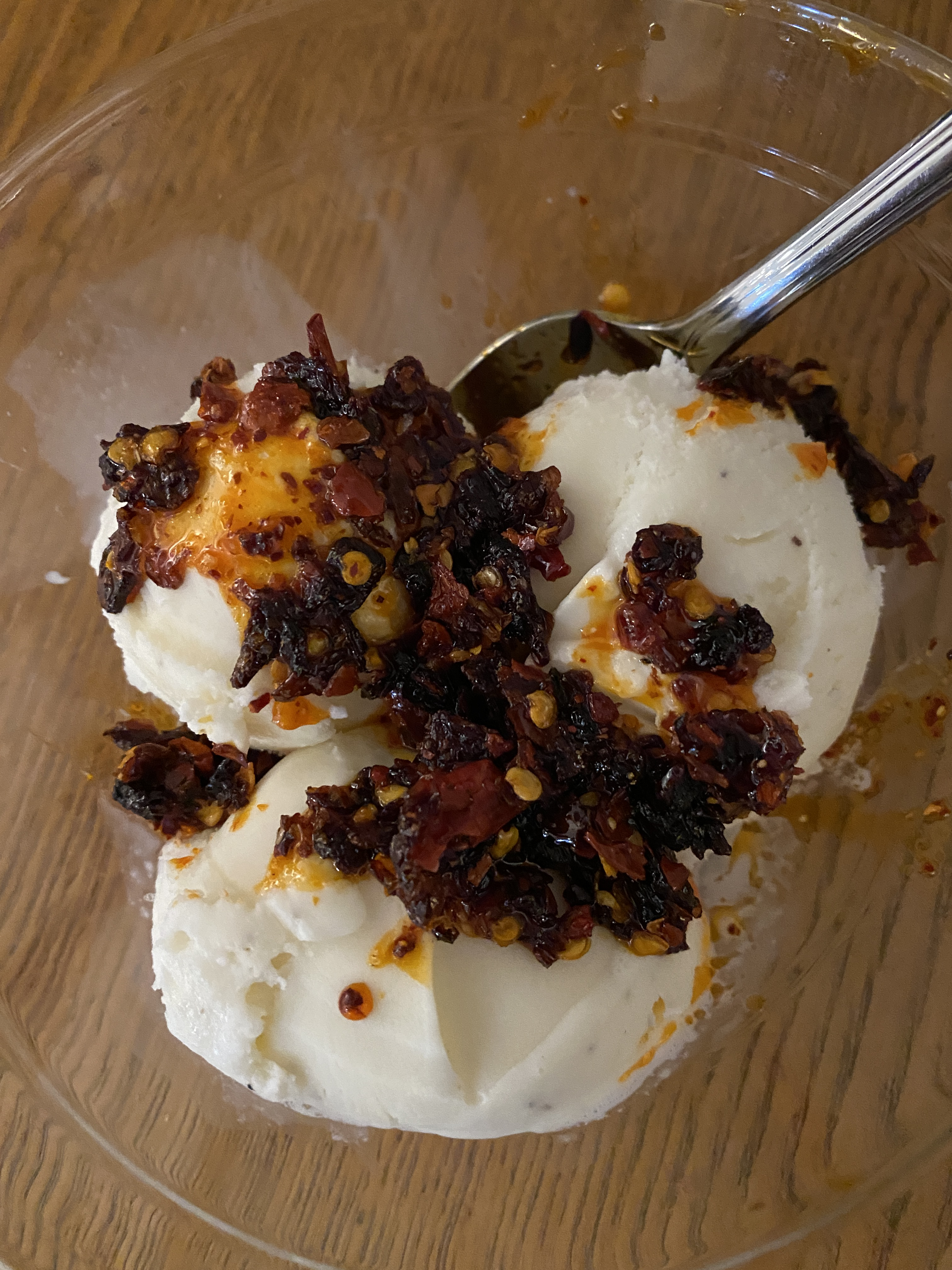
Chili crisp on vanilla ice cream

It has been described as being good with "anything" and "everything", including desserts. Sam Sifton described it as "magical" and "a condiment to improve all it touches". Lucky Peach listed it among their pantry staples.

Chili crisp is typically used as a condiment rather than as a cooking ingredient. It is used to top many different dishes, such as avocado toast, tacos, eggs, fish, vegetables, salads, fruit, grains, peanut brittle, or vanilla ice cream. It is spooned onto or stirred into soups and broths. It is tossed into noodles or used to top them. It is used as a dip or spread.

Jing Gao, the proprietor of artisan chili crisp company Fly By Jing, called topping ice cream with the condiment an example of dark cuisine, a term used on the Chinese internet for bizarre food combinations.

== Production ==
Various techniques are used, including simmering, if not stir-frying the ingredients in hot oil. To enhance crispness, moist ingredients such as onions are simmered in oil separately first to eliminate their liquids.

== Variations ==
Variations of chili crisp appear in various parts of the world, but are most commonly found in Taiwan, Japan, and Mexico, often with local ingredients such as árbol chiles and sesame seeds. Lao Gan Ma remains the largest chili crisp company, with annual sales reaching $835.6 million USD in 2020.

== See also ==
- List of condiments
