= Fly By Jing =

Brand of chili crisp

Fly By Jing is a brand of chili crisp created by American entrepreneur Jing Gao.

== History ==
Founder Jing Gao, who had worked as a brand manager at Procter & Gamble, became interested in a culinary career after moving back to China to work in technology. After switching careers she launched a restaurant in Shanghai before moving to California to open Fly By Jing as a direct-to-consumer business. Gao opened a Kickstarter for the brand in 2018. In 2020, as the COVID-19 pandemic increased interest in home cooking, a feature story in the New York Times about chili crisp that mentioned Gao and Fly By Jing resulted in an increase in sales.

In 2024, Fly By Jing partnered with Mixt Greens to create a salad featuring Original Sichuan Chili Crisp.

In 2025 the company transitioned away from the direct-to-consumer model with a new focus on retail. They collaborated with Frankie Gaw to launch a chili crisp ketchup. Also in 2025 they launched a packaged dried noodle with a soy sauce, initially available at Costco. For Christmas 2025 they offered a chili crisp advent calendar.

== Use ==
Jing Gao, the proprietor of artisan chili crisp company Fly By Jing, called topping ice cream with the condiment an example of dark cuisine, a term used on the Chinese internet for bizarre food combinations.
