= Nikki Tran =

American chef

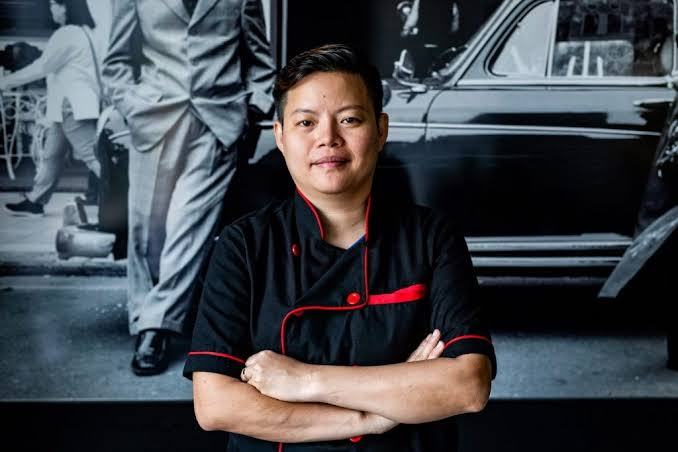
Nikki Tran

Nikki Tran is a Vietnamese-American chef and restaurateur. She is the founder of Kau Ba in Houston. she has appeared on Netflix series such as Somebody Feed Phil (2018), Ugly Delicious (2019), and Street Food: Asia (2019).
