= Cooking Master Boy =

Japanese manga series

- First tankōbon volume cover, featuring Liu Mao Xing (front) and Liu Ke Lin (back)

中華一番! (Chūka Ichiban)
- Genre: Cooking
- Manga
- Written by: Etsushi Ogawa
- Published by: Kodansha
- Magazine: Weekly Shōnen Magazine (October 11, 1995 – May 29, 1996); Magazine Special (July 5 – November 5, 1996)
- Original run: October 11, 1995 – November 5, 1996
- Volumes: 5
- Manga

Shin Chūka Ichiban!
- Written by: Etsushi Ogawa
- Published by: Kodansha
- Magazine: Weekly Shōnen Magazine
- Original run: January 1, 1997 – May 19, 1999
- Volumes: 12
- Anime television series
- Directed by: Masami Anno
- Produced by: Shunichi Kosao; Madoka Takiyama
- Music by: Michihiko Ohta
- Studio: Nippon Animation (Note: Production assistance (制作協力) for all episodes were provided by Studio Pierrot.)
- Original network: FNS (Fuji TV)
- Original run: April 27, 1997 – September 13, 1998
- Episodes: 52
- Manga

Chūka Ichiban! Kiwami
- Written by: Etsushi Ogawa
- Published by: Kodansha
- Magazine: Magazine Pocket
- Original run: November 10, 2017 – present
- Volumes: 22
- Anime television series

True Cooking Master Boy
- Directed by: Itsuro Kawasaki
- Produced by: Hiroshi Kamei; Morio Kitaoka; Teruaki Jitsumatsu; Ouyang Yanting; Kou Kusunoki; Huang Xueying; Rina Shinoda (1–12); Airi Sawada (13–24)
- Written by: Itsuro Kawasaki
- Music by: Jun Ichikawa
- Studio: Production I.G (Note: Although several other studios are credited for アニメーション制作協力 throughout the 24 episodes, Production I.G is the only studio present throughout all episodes; the others most likely assisted I.G with production. These include: AXsiZ (8), Unison (9), NSMU PLUS (10), Second Gate (12 and 13), Creators in Pack (12 and 13, 17, 21), Studio Lings (15, 19, 23), Seven Stones (17), LandQ Studios (20))
- Licensed by: Crunchyroll; NA: Remow; SEA: China Film Animation
- Original network: MBS, TBS, BS-TBS, Tokyo MX, BS NTV
- Original run: October 12, 2019 – March 30, 2021
- Episodes: 24
- icon

Cooking Master Boy, known in Japan as Chūka Ichiban! (中華一番!; 'China's Number One!'), is a Japanese manga series written and illustrated by Etsushi Ogawa. It was serialized in Kodansha's Weekly Shōnen Magazine and Magazine Special from October 1995 to November 1996; a follow-up sequel, Shin Chūka Ichiban!, was serialized in Weekly Shōnen Magazine from January 1997 to May 1999. Both series' overall chapters were collected in seventeen tankōbon volumes. The story is centered on Liu Mao Xing, a boy whose aim is to become the best chef he could be. In November 2017, Ogawa started a sequel entitled Chūka Ichiban! Kiwami, published on Kodansha's Magazine Pocket app.

A 52-episode anime television series adaptation by Nippon Animation aired on Fuji TV from April 1997 to September 1998. A 24-episode anime television series adaptation of Shin Chūka Ichiban!, titled True Cooking Master Boy, produced by NAS and Production I.G, aired for two seasons from October to December 2019 and January to March 2021, respectively.

== Plot ==
The story takes place in 19th-century China during the Qing dynasty, where the Emperor was weakened, and the country was close to chaos. It is also during a fictitious era called "The Era of the Cooking Wars". It was an era in which top chefs with different cooking styles tried their best to improve their skills and to become the best chef in China. It is a country where insulting a high-grade chef or fooling around with cooking could land a person in a jail, and impersonating a top-chef is as bad as usurpation of authority. Chefs compete with each other in order to gain respect and even power, but also with the risks of losing everything.

After the death of Mao's mother, Pai, who was called the "Goddess of Cuisine", Mao becomes a Super Chef in order to take the title as Master Chef of his mother's restaurant. However, before he takes his mother's place as Master Chef, he continues to travel China in order to learn more of the many ways of cooking, in the hopes of becoming a legendary chef, just like his mother. During his journey, he meets great friends and fierce rivals who wish to challenge him in the field of cooking.

== Characters ==
=== Main characters ===
Liu Mao Xing (劉昴星) (Chinese: 劉昴星; pinyin: Liú Mǎoxīng)
Voiced by: Mayumi Tanaka (1997 anime), Natsumi Fujiwara (2019 anime)
Mao is a 13-year-old boy raised in his mother's restaurant, where he develops a deep passion for cooking and inherits her skills. Despite his knowledge, he rarely cooks, leading others to assume he lacks culinary ability. When his mother's restaurant faces crisis, Mao reveals his exceptional talent, surprising everyone. Recognized as a prodigy by General Lee, he embarks on a journey to become a Super Chef, eventually earning the title as the youngest in history. Driven by curiosity and his mother's belief that a chef's duty is to bring joy through food, Mao prioritizes his customers' satisfaction. His extraordinary palate allows him to recall every dish he has tasted, identifying ingredients with precision, making him a formidable culinary talent.
Mei Li (梅麗) (Chinese: 周梅麗; pinyin: Zhōu Méilì)
Voiced by: Satsuki Yukino (1997 anime), Ai Kayano (2019 anime)
Mei Li is the 16-year-old daughter of Chouyu and a former helper at the Yang Spring Restaurant. She develops feelings for Mao after witnessing his dedication to cooking and kindness toward others. Though her culinary knowledge is limited, she assists Mao with minor tasks and trivia. When Mao departs to travel China, she is devastated, having hoped for a future with him, and ultimately decides to join him (though the manga excludes her from his journey). Prone to jealousy, she frequently clashes with Shirou and reacts aggressively when other women approach Mao, such as mistaking his sister Karin for a romantic rival. Her fiercest competition for Mao's affection, however, is his passion for cooking. Mei Li strongly resembles her late mother, Meika.
Si Lang/Shirou (四郎)
Voiced by: Chika Sakamoto (1997 anime), Yukiyo Fujii (2019 anime)
Shirou is a 12-year-old mischievous traveler of mixed Japanese and Chinese heritage. Mao and Mei Li find him unconscious from hunger in the forest (in the manga, he crashes into Mao after stealing food). He left his village at age 10 to become a Super Chef but returns two years later pretending to hold the title, only to be exposed when officials reveal his badge is fake. After discovering Mao is a real Super Chef, Shirou declares himself Mao's apprentice. Though only an average cook, he knows more than Mei Li and constantly annoys her with teasing and inappropriate behavior, leading to violent retaliation. He later trains as a chef at the Yang Spring Restaurant.
Xie Lu (解魯)
Voiced by: Hiroshi Yanaka (1997 anime), Yuichi Nakamura (2019 anime)
Xie Lu, called "Steel Staff Xie", is a Dim Sum master from San Sei and the youngest to hold this title. He carries a steel staff used for both combat and cooking, its end marked with yellow stars representing defeated Super Chefs. After losing to Mao, he engraves a black star, hoping to someday change it to yellow. A wandering chef since youth, he frequently encounters Mao's group during their travels. His cheerful demeanor contrasts with his dislike of Shirou, stemming from a poorly prepared meal. Athletic and mathematically gifted, he later joins their search for the Legendary Cooking Utensils. His Fookien name is Ji Long.
Lei En/Leon (雷恩)
Voiced by: Nobutoshi Hayashi (1997 anime), Tomokazu Sugita (2019 anime)
Leon, a skilled seafood chef and knife master, first appears as a Dark Cooking Society member demanding a Legendary Cooking Utensil from Yang Spring Restaurant. After losing to Mao in battle, he reveals that he is actually another Ever-Soul knife successor who left the Society. Once a prodigy at Yang Spring, young Leon mastered cooking techniques rapidly but showed compassion by placing talismans on animals he cooked. His relentless pursuit of knowledge led him to the Dark Cooking Society, where he obtained the legendary Seven-Star Knives through questionable means. Now remorseful, he joins Mao to prevent the Society from acquiring the Legendary Utensils, despite encountering another chef wielding duplicate knives.
Tang San Jie (唐三杰)
Voiced by: Daisuke Sakaguchi (first), Tetsuya Iwanaga (later) (1997 anime), Nobuhiko Okamoto (2019 anime)
San Jie, a 14-year-old Shanghai chef, was a resentful 4th-level cook at Yang Spring Restaurant who feared Mao would replace him. Though perceived as lazy, Mao discovered him secretly practicing at night, revealing his hidden passion. San Jie confessed his traumatic past—his strict chef father's harsh training caused a hand injury and family conflict, driving him to run away. The scar reminded him of these painful memories, affecting his knife skills. After Mao convinced him not to quit, they devised a plan to save San Jie's position. Ultimately, San Jie chose to return home to reconcile with his father and resume training. When they later reunite in Shanghai, San Jie has become head chef at his father's restaurant, having significantly refined his skills.
Lan Fei Hong (蘭飛鴻)
Voiced by: Ryōtarō Okiayu (1997 anime), Junya Enoki (2019 anime)
Fei, a 16-year-old culinary prodigy, emerges as Mao's most skilled rival. Calm and methodical, he first appears as Mao's opponent in the Super Chef tournament, where they simultaneously pass the test. Though seemingly cold, he assists Mao during the competition. Orphaned by the Dark Cooking Society, Fei endured brutal training until escaping to Kikkaro Restaurant. Pai's kindness showed him cooking's true purpose—bringing joy. When they reunite, Fei appears as a Society member about to lead the Imperial Kitchen. After losing to Mao, he reveals he was drugged and manipulated. Though guilty of wrongdoing, he joins Mao's quest under General Lee's orders to protect him while seeking redemption.
Pai (阿貝)
Voiced by: Rihoko Yoshida (1997 anime)
Pai, known as the "Sichuan Fairy" or "Fairy of Cuisine", was a legendary Sichuan chef and Mao's late mother. As former Master Chef of Kikkaro Restaurant, she earned nationwide respect. Though she never formally taught Mao techniques, she instilled in him the philosophy of cooking to bring joy and health. The Underground Cooking Society viewed Pai as a threat, frequently sending challengers she consistently defeated. She documented their Dark Cooking Techniques in a notebook later inherited by Mao. The manga reveals she died from overwork after her pupil Shao An poached her staff. Her culinary legacy lives on through Mao.

=== Minor characters ===
Zhou Yu (周瑜)
Voiced by: Akio Ōtsuka (1997 anime), Yoshimitsu Shimoyama (2019 anime)
Zhou Yu, Vice Chef of Yang Spring Restaurant, ranks among Guangzhou's finest chefs. As Ruoh rarely cooks, he manages the kitchen with strict discipline. Though known for his steel-hearted demeanor and unchanging expression, he commands deep respect. Only Ruoh can provoke him or sway his decisions. He becomes Mao's mentor and is revealed as Mei's father. Despite his culinary mastery, he proves inept as a fisherman, losing badly to Ruoh in a fishing challenge. His failed attempt to outfish Ruoh leaves him visibly frustrated, showcasing one of his few emotional displays.
Ruoh (羅添大師)
Voiced by: Takkō Ishimori (1997 anime), Shinpachi Tsuji (2019 anime)
Ruoh, Master Chef of Yang Spring Restaurant, is a highly respected culinary figure in Guangzhou. Despite his advanced age, he possesses remarkable physical strength, earning him the nickname "Superman Chef". His legendary "Skill of God" technique, demonstrated with the mighty Devil Cow Knife (capable of butchering an entire cow in two strokes), showcases his power, though he rarely uses it now. One of Guangzhou's four Cooking Elders and Chouyu's mentor, Ruoh maintains a relaxed demeanor, often seen drinking alcohol. His unassuming appearance belies both his culinary mastery and his surprising physical prowess.
Shao An (紹安)
Voiced by: Tsubasa Chioya (1997 anime), Keiichi Nakagawa (2019 anime)
Shao An, once Pai's star apprentice, became Mao's first rival after an accident left him scarred and unable to cook. Bitter and vengeful, he returned to seize Kikkaro Restaurant, contributing to Pai's death and tormenting her son. After losing a judged cooking battle to Mao, he was forced to quit as a chef—only to resurface as an Underground Cooking Society member. Defeated again, Shao An attempted a final act of vengeance by detonating their boat. As he fell, Mao tried to save him. Redeemed by Mao's words, Shao An severed his own hand to prevent dragging Mao down (in the anime, he simply slips). Before dying, he gave Mao the missing half of Pai's Underground research.
Admiral Lee Hong Yue (李鴻悦 / 李提督)
Voiced by: Jūrōta Kosugi (1997 anime)
An Imperial Army Admiral and Master Chef of the Emperor's Imperial Kitchen who holds the highest culinary rank in China. Recognizing Mao's exceptional talent, he sends him on a journey to become a Super Chef. Throughout Mao's travels, Lee frequently appears to assign additional challenges, aiming to cultivate Mao's potential into true greatness. As the nation's top chef, Lee serves as both mentor and evaluator, testing Mao's growth at key moments while guiding him toward culinary mastery. His appearances often mark important turning points in Mao's development as a chef.
Liu Ke Lin (劉珂玲)
Voiced by: Yumi Hikita (1997 anime)
Mao's older sister. She works at the Kikkaro Restaurant as a waitress. When her mother died, she was the one left to take care of the restaurant.
Shan (向恩 / シャン)
Voiced by: Maya Okamoto (1997 anime), Yūko Kaida (2019 anime)
Mira (密拉 / ミラ)
Voiced by: Aya Endō (2019 anime)
Juchi (朱七 / ジュチ)
Voiced by: Daisuke Ono (2019 anime)
Ensei (顏先 / エンセイ)
Voiced by: Kenjiro Tsuda (2019 anime)
Alkan (亞刊 / アルカン)
Voiced by: Hiroki Yasumoto (2019 anime)
Kaiyu (凱由 / カイユ)
Voiced by: Daisuke Namikawa (2019 anime)

== Media ==
=== Manga ===
Written and illustrated by Etsushi Ogawa, Chūka Ichiban! was first serialized in Kodansha's Weekly Shōnen Magazine from October 11, 1995, to May 29, 1996. It was later moved to the publisher's Magazine Special, where it ran from July 5 to November 5, 1996. (Note: Published between the 1996 7th and 11th issues (cover dates July 5 and November 5).) Kodansha collected its chapters in five tankōbon volumes, released from February 14, 1996, and December 11, 1996.

A follow-up sequel, Shin Chūka Ichiban! (真・中華一番!; lit. 'True China's Number One!'), was serialized in Weekly Shōnen Magazine from January 1, 1997, to May 19, 1999. Its chapters were collected in twelve tankōbon volumes, published between May 14, 1997, and June 15, 1999.

Ogawa started a sequel, titled Chūka Ichiban! Kiwami (中華一番！極), published on Kodansha's Magazine Pocket app since November 10, 2017. Kodansha has compiled its chapters into individual tankōbon volumes. The first volume was published on April 9, 2018. As of August 7, 2026, twenty-two volumes have been published.

=== Anime ===
==== 1997 series ====
An anime television series adaptation by Nippon Animation aired on Fuji TV from April 27, 1997, to September 13, 1998.

===== Episodes =====
No.	Title	Directed by	Written by	Original release date
1	"Genius Cooking Boy Mao"; Transliteration: "Tensai Ryōri Shōnen Mao" (Japanese: 天才料理少年マオ)	Yutaka Kagawa	Yoshiyuki Suga	April 27, 1997
It is the middle of the Qing Dynasty, and China is currently undergoing a cooking renaissance. As a result, the imperial government now allows state-sponsored restaurants with great prestige across the country. Among these is the Sichuan-based Chrysanthemum Tower that was run by Liu Maoxing's late mother, Pai, known famously as the Magician of Sichuan. While Mao is out foraging for ingredients, Pai's disgraced top student, Shao An, returns and lays claim to both the title of Super Chef and the Chrysanthemum Tower. Mao, however, refuses to allow this and gets into a scuffle with Shao An until provincial commander Lee arrives and clarifies that Shao An needed to prove he was worthy of the restaurant first. For Shao An's task, he is ordered to prepare fried rice, which he easily passes with a mix of expensive ingredients. In response, Mao matches Shao An's rice by cooking a golden fried rice with each grain cooked to perfection with his skilled wok control. In response, Shao An challenges Mao for the right of the Chrysanthemum Tower's ownership with the loser having their cooking license revoked.
2	"The Mystery Mapo Tofu Confrontation"; Transliteration: "Maboroshi no Mābō Dōfu Taiketsu" (Japanese: 幻の麻婆豆腐対決)	Jun Takagi	Yoshiyuki Suga	May 4, 1997
For Mao and Shao An's duel, Lee recounts a magical Mapo Tofu that he once ate after a tiring courier mission. Despite being completely fatigued and tired, the Mapo Tofu reinvigorated his body, and Lee orders both to create a new Mapo Tofu with the magical dish's "sixth factor". Mao and his sister, Ke Lin, remember their mother's old Mapo Tofu which notably was refreshing despite them eating it all the time. Once Mao and Shao An arrive for their duel, they both collectively find the mystery factor to be the crispiness of the dish. Shao An prepares high quality tofu that can be stacked atop one another into a tower, but Mao correctly guesses that the texture was not in the tofu, but actually the ground meat. Instead, Mao switches the ground meat with marinated and fried soybeans, which is identical to the "magical Mapo Tofu" Lee received from Pai long ago. As a result, Mao is granted his mother's restaurant while Shao An is cast out in disgrace. Rather than immediately leave the restaurant to Mao, Lee instructs the young cook to train at Guangzhou and hone his skills.
3	"Go For It! Super Chef"; Transliteration: "Mezase! Tokkyū Chūshi" (Japanese: めざせ！特級厨師)	Masakatsu Iijima	Nobuaki Kishima	May 11, 1997
Following Lee's instructions, Mao goes to the Yang Spring Restaurant where he meets the vice head chef Zhou Yu, who is famous for bringing out the taste of bok choys. Lee orders Mao to make stir-fried bok choy for the staff's lunch, but Mao's plate is completely ignored. Zhou Yu kicks Mao out, stating that he did not fully use his nose when cooking. While pondering what this meant, Mao meets an old drunkard and dives into the river to retrieve his gourd. After tasting the river water, Mao realizes that the loess of the river trickled into his bok choys when he blanched them. In response, Mao returns to remake his dish for the staff's breakfast the next day. To solve the issue, Mao coats the bok choy with chicken oil that keeps the vegetable's flavor locked in and enhances the taste when fried. As a result, the entire staff consumes Mao's dish as a sign of approval before they are joined by the old drunkard, who turns out to be Ruoh, Yang Spring's head chef.
4	"Ruthless! The Rule of Yosen Shuka!!"; Transliteration: "Hijō! Yōsen Shuka no Okite!!" (Japanese: 非情！陽泉酒家の掟！！)	Ken'ichi Nishida	Hiroshi Toda	May 18, 1997
Mao begins his work at Yang Spring but is bullied by San Jie, another young chef in the kitchen. Despite San Jie being labelled as a lazy vagrant, Mao notices San Jie training his wok skills hard at night, mixing rice until the grains turned black from the iron. The next day, Mao cleans the dishes with Zhou Yu's daughter, Mei Li, and finds that the peppers for their green pepper pork were all ignored by customers. Upon further inspection, he learns that San Jie had cut the vegetables in irregular fashion, leading to improper cooking. Zhou Yu soon arrives and fires San Jie for failing the prep test, and due to the restaurant's strict hiring quota. Mao attempts to stop San Jie from leaving, resulting in both of them falling into the water, and San Jie missing his boat. While waiting for his clothes to dry, San Jie reveals that his hands were scarred from his father's beatings after failing to cut vegetables at an appropriate length. Unable to take the harsh training, San Jie ran away and moved to Guangzhou for training.
5	"Break with Tradition! Defeat: Yosen Shuka"; Transliteration: "Dentō o Uchiyabure! Datō: Yōsen Shuka" (Japanese: 伝統を打ち破れ！打倒・陽泉酒家)	Makoto Fuchigami	Hiroshi Toda	May 25, 1997
After learning San Jie's story, Mao returns to beg for San Jie's return but is flatly rejected by Zhou Yu. Hoping to prove their worth, San Jie and Mao split work to wok and prep respectively to recreate a perfect version of Yang Spring's green pepper pork. As this was not enough to impress Zhou Yu, Mao and San Jie come up with a new idea to use pomegranate juice to their creation to add extra sourness to the spicy dish. The next day, San Jie, Mao, and Mei Li start a pop-up outside the Yang Spring Restaurant that becomes an instant hit. After tasting their dish, Zhou Yu and Ruoh both agree to rehire San Jie. Inspired by Mao's work, San Jie trains his cutting skills until he can finally make the perfect cuts his father desired. With his spirits still high, San Jie eventually chooses to leave Yang Spring anyway to return and learn from his father in Shanghai. He is seen off by Mao as the two promise to meet again one day.
6	"Flame Chefs: The Dumpling Brothers"; Transliteration: "Kaen Ryōrinin: Gyōza Kyōdai" (Japanese: 火炎料理人・餃子兄弟)	Jun Takagi	Yoshiyuki Suga	June 1, 1997
Guangzhou is preparing for their annual dumpling festival with a cook-off between the restaurants. Zhou Yu prepares special dumplings with ground spinach mixed into the skin, and a spicy sauce inspired from Sichuan. On their way home, Mao and Mei Li sample other dumplings and meet the Dumpling Brothers, Takeo and Aru handing out their fried dumplings in public. Mao, however, tastes the dish and is confident Zhou Yu's is better. In response, Aru attacks Zhou Yu at night, breaking his arm and preventing him from competing. The next day, Mao and Mei Li continue their rounds and find the Dumpling Brothers causing a commotion inside another local restaurant, insulting the chef's xiaolongbao and starting a fight with the staff. In response, Mao angrily challenges the brothers and promises to beat them at their own game with fried dumplings.
7	"Despicable Trap! Mao Cornered"; Transliteration: "Hiretsu na Wana! Oitsumerareta Mao" (Japanese: 卑劣な罠！追いつめられたマオ)	Yutaka Kagawa	Nobuaki Kishima	June 8, 1997
The dumpling festival begins with the Dumpling Brothers getting a long head start with their crowned shengjianbao. As Mao prepares his stall, he finds that his dumplings' sauce has been ruined behind his back, most likely by the brothers. Because of this, Mao is forced to think of a new dish on the spot. In the last hours of the festival, Yang Spring receives its first customer; an old man chased away by the Dumpling Brothers. The man tastes Mao's dumpling and finds that Mao had carefully added broth into the dumpling's skin and lard inside the filling to remove the need for a sauce. The old man then reveals himself as Lang Wen, Lee's superior officer and former imperial headchef, and his reputation helps being customers back to the Yang Spring stall. By the end of the day, Mao and the Dumpling Brothers are tied, and Lang Wen and the audience decide to settle the matter with a tie breaker on the next day.
8	"Confrontation! Dragon Dumpling!!"; Transliteration: "Taiketsu! Doragon Gyōza!!" (Japanese: 対決！ドラゴン餃子！！)	Masakatsu Iijima	Yoshiyuki Suga	June 15, 1997
On the night before the tiebreaker, Aru sneaks into the Yang Spring stall, attempting to sabotage Mao's food a second time. This time, he is stopped by Zhou Yu, who berates him for acting without a chef's honor, and abandoning his pride for fame and fortune. Upon returning, Aru is surprised to find Takeo working hard, reinvigorated by Mao's spirit to create a new dumpling. On the tie-breaker, both sides serve prawn dumplings shaped like dragons. While the dumpling brothers steamed theirs and added rich seafoods to their filling, Mao's dumpling is able to stand on its own when heated by steam. The contest is decided with a unanimous vote from all customers in favor of Mao. The secret, would not only be Mao using two different dough types for his dumpling's skin, but that he also included the prawn's brain into the filling for a richer taste. The Dumpling Brothers graciously concede defeat to Mao and help him celebrate before they are met by Lee once more. Lee congratulates Mao for his victory and instructs him to now take Guangdong's Super Chef Exam, the imperial culinary test that his mother previously passed.
9	"Challenge the Dream! Super Chef Examination"; Transliteration: "Yume e no Chōsen! Tokkyū Chūshi Shiken" (Japanese: 夢への挑戦！特級厨師試験)	Ken'ichi Nishida	Nobuaki Kishima	June 22, 1997
To prepare for his upcoming test, Mao contacts Ke Lin to bring special equipment and ingredients for him, including their mother's cleaver. Upon arrival, Mao meets Wang Hu, another aspiring chef, who points that their biggest competition. Han of Dongjiang Restaurant, known for his skill in knifework, Che Lin, nicknamed the witch for her unusual combination in dishes, Tang, head chef of Bancai Restaurant and said to be a match for Zhou Yu, and Fei, a mysterious newcomer taking the cooking world by storm. The examination team unveils the preliminary test's theme of "Unparalleled Scholar Noodles" with all contestants scrambling to the test kitchen. Mao, however, realizes that he is missing a special rock ordered from Ke Lin, and Mei Li rushes to retrieve it as Mao cannot leave the test premises.
10	"Ultimate Skill! Incomparable Noodles"; Transliteration: "Kyūkyoku no Waza! Kokushi Musō no Men" (Japanese: 究極の技！国士無双の麺)	Makoto Fuchigami	Yoshiyuki Suga	July 6, 1997
The preliminary Super Chef Exam is underway as Mao cannot do anything until Mei Li's arrival. Han is the first to finish by grounding cattle, pork and chicken bones into a rich broth for his noodles. Han's justification for his qualification being that his noodles could strengthen the weak and make them unparalleled. Once Mei Li arrives, Mao grounds the stone and mixes it into boiling water. By then, however, Tang is the second to pass with his "Eight Virtue Noodles", each quality ingredient representing one of the Eight Virtues. Mao begins mixing his water mixture and preparing his dough when Che Lin is the third to pass after adding various game and exotic meats into her noodles such as bats, scorpions and rabbits, which she states can only be fit for the unparalleled. As Mao starts to knead his dough, Fei finishes his dragon whisker noodles, making them with an emphasis on the lotus flowers added for scent and sweetness. When asked why his flamboyant dish that focused on beauty and grace should accepted, Fei qualifies by having it serve as a representation to the unmatched beauty that can complement the unparalleled scholar. Mao is finally able to finish his dish, a lightly season and fried noodles at the same time Wang finishes his bowl. Both raise their hands at the same time, but the judges spot Wang's hand first and judge him before Mao.
11	"Final Battle! The Legendary Cooking Arena"; Transliteration: "Saishū Kessen! Densetsu no Tōmi-jō" (Japanese: 最終決戦！伝説の闘味場)	Akira Takamura	Nobuaki Kishima	July 13, 1997
Wang's dish consists of a rich seafood broth with sliced Dongpo pork, and he accredits his dish's qualities with the scholar Su Dongpo. Unfortunately, the judges fail him as Su focused on a frugal and humble lifestyle in his later years, which contrasted the expensive ingredients Wang's dish consisted of. Mao's dish is then tasted, and despite not having any soup or additional toppings, the seasoned noodles are extremely firm thanks to the fresh lye water he made from the ordered rock. When asked why he deserved a spot, Mao cited the general Han Xin, who was formidable even without armor or weapons. As a result, Mao is the last of the chefs to qualify and he moves on to the final stage, overseen by Pai's old rival, Reika. Reika gives the chefs the themes of "Noodles" and "Not Noodles" before ordering them to finish their dishes by the moon's set. The chefs begin their prep work with Han preparing to butcher an entire ox, Fei picking out and peeling a basket of potatoes, Che Lin preparing gunpowder, Tang performing a thumbstand, and Mao deciding to use catfish as his base ingredient.
12	"A Great Rival Appears: Talented Young Chef Fei"; Transliteration: "Shukumei no Tensai: Bishōnen Ryōrinin Fei" (Japanese: 宿命の天才・美少年料理人フェイ)	Jun Takagi	Yoshiyuki Suga	August 3, 1997
The Super Chef Exam begins with each of the five chefs now starting to prepare their dishes. Mao is able to ground his catfish and mix it with egg whites to form a "dough" which he then presses through a cloth sieve to form noodles. When he tastes the raw noodles, however, Mao finds that he has suddenly lost his sense of taste and begins panicking. Fei notices this and finds that someone had pricked Mao with a poisoned needle, restoring Mao's taste. When asked why he helped them, Fei reveals he was previously kidnapped and forced to cook for an underground cooking ring before he managed to escape and was rescued by Pai. It was during this stay that he met the infant Mao for the first time. Having repaid Pai, Fei returns to his station with the chefs returning to their work. Mao continues his work by creating a seabream based stock for his noodles. Upon tasting, however, Mao realizes that his noodles have become completely mushy after being cooked.
13	"The Catfish Noodle Completed! Fated Decision"; Transliteration: "Kansei Namazu Men! Unmei no Hantei" (Japanese: 完成ナマズ麺！運命の判定)	Yutaka Kagawa	Nobuaki Kishima	August 10, 1997
The chefs begin their final preparations for their dishes with Han slicing his beef into thin strips, Fei hard pressing his ground potatoes to form noodles, Che Lin using dynamite to blow and cook her noodles out of their mesh, and Tang creating cat ear shaped doughs to cook. Mao is finally able to solve the texture problem of his noodles by incorporating squid. Time is soon up, and the chefs are brought to assess each other's food. Che Lin starts with a wild bowl of rice vermicelli with a squid ink based sauce. Han and Tang enter a trance when they start eating, but Mao and Fei instantly spit the dish out after tracing opium in the dish. Additionally, Fei removes Che Lin's cloak to find the poisoned needles that pricked Mao. For her actions, Reika not only revokes Che Lin's license but also banishes her from the province entirely. Tang's then serves his cat ear noodles, but none of the chefs eat it with Han pointing out that while Tang had changed the shape, he still used a wheat dough and had failed to follow the "Not Noodles" portion of the test. Han is the third to serve using a rich beef egg drop soup with thinly sliced meat to serve as noodles, which Fei and Mao compliment for creativity. Fei serves a refreshing cold soup with his potato noodles, as a hot soup would erode the potato noodles' shape. Mao is last to serve, with his catfish paste being mixed around strands of dried squid to solve the texture problem after cooking. The three chefs grade each other and Han defeats Fei and Mao, 10-9-9.
14	"Proof of Champions: The Emblem of Glory"; Transliteration: "Shōsha no Akashi: Eikō no Enburemu" (Japanese: 勝者の証・栄光の紋章(エンブレム))	Kunihisa Sugishima	Hiroshi Toda	August 17, 1997
Reika orders Han to step up after defeating Fei and Mao, but congratulates him by sending him home instead. When Han demands an explanation, Reika reveals that Fei and Mao graded each other and Han 8-5 respectively, but Han had graded his peers unjustly at 1-1. Han accepts his mistake and apologizes to Mao and Fei before taking his leave, and Reika orders the two to grade themselves on a scale of 10. Mao steps up and gives himself a full 10, believing he had made the best dish possible with the settings at hand. Fei also gives himself a 10 for the same reason. Ultimately, Reika passes both of them, giving them both the title of Super Chef. Mao chooses not to return to Sichuan immediately and decides to go on an education journey around the country, while Mei Li also packs her belongings and joins Mao on his journey.
15	"Genius Boy Chef?! Shirou?"; Transliteration: "Tensai Ryōri Shōnen!? Shirō?" (Japanese: 天才料理少年！？シロウ？)	Ken'ichi Nishida	Nobuaki Kishima	August 24, 1997
Mao and Mei Li stop at a forest on their trip to Yunnan, where they find a boy named Si Lang passed out. After feeding him, Si Lang falsely claims to be a Super Chef and takes them to town, but find that the new magistrate, a Beijing native, is on a closing spree as he cannot find a restaurant that can satisfy him. The restaurant of Si Lang's family is next on the cutting block as Si Lang and his mother prepare meat buns and rice balls with pickled plum as for Mao and Mei Li to taste test. Mao finds that the seasoning for the meat buns lacking and remakes the plate with extra seasoning and sauce in the filling. Although it is delicious, the governor is unable to eat it, complaining that it is too hot, and exposing Si Lang as a fake. Mao sees the governor true issues and volunteers to solve the issue instead. Mao then prepares a full steamer of fried rice with pickled plums to add a tang and coolness when eating, bringing back the governor's appetite and satiating him. Mao explains that the overspiced dishes of the south were not something his palate was used to, which was the cause of him being unable to eat properly. With the matter resolved, Mao and Mei Li leave, but Si Lang takes his belongings and joins them as Mao's disciple.
16	"Super Boobs! Beware of the Beauty Sweet Trap"; Transliteration: "Chō Boin! Bijin ni Chūi Amai Wana" (Japanese: 超ボイン！美人に注意甘い罠)	Makoto Fuchigami	Yoshiyuki Suga	August 31, 1997
Mao's party reaches Quqing village in Yunnan where Super Chef and former Yang Spring cook, Jia Xiong, had set up his restaurant and became famous for his scorched rice. Rather than Jia Xiong, the group are warmly received by his granddaughter, Jia Yanli. She asks for Mao's help in recreating her late grandfather's old dish as the province's proconsulate, an old family friend, was arriving soon. Mao is taken to the kitchen where he is presented with her grandfather's specialized equipment, including a pair of conjoined woks that form a sphere. Over the night, Mao learns that woks can be rotated to initially cook the rice into a sphere before deep fried, but Jia drugs Mao and Si Lang with sleeping pills to take the credit for herself.
17	"Return! Dreamy Singe Cuisine"; Transliteration: "Yomigaere! Maboroshi no Okoge Ryōri" (Japanese: 甦れ！幻のおこげ料理)	Masakatsu Iijima	Yoshiyuki Suga	September 14, 1997
Mei Li finds Jia attempting to pass Mao's discovery as her own and quickly rescues him and Si Lang from the storehouse. At the same time, the governor is not impressed with Jia's dish, noting that while it shared the same shape, it lacked the flavor. Mao arrives on time to take the reins and creates another spherical ball of rice. Unlike the previous scorched rice, Mao's rice ball cracks on its own, revealing that he had also stewed the dish's sauce inside the ball as he cooked it. Through this, Mao recreates Jia Xiong's missing creation and brings the proconsulate to tears. As he leaves the village, Jia Yanli apologizes to Mao for deceiving him and sees him off with a kiss to the cheek, much to Mei Li's jealous fury.
18	"Scary Red Congee: Secret of the Haunted Mansion"; Transliteration: "Aka no Kyōfu: Yūrei Yashiki no Himitsu" (Japanese: 赤の恐怖・幽霊屋敷の秘密)	Yutaka Kagawa	Nobuaki Kishima	September 21, 1997
Mao's party gets lost at a forest at night and coincidentally find a large mansion to take shelter. There, they find a sickly family being tended to by their chef. Though the side dishes and appetizers are good, Mao notices that the family's bodies are sickly and weak, while they are addicted to the chef's red congee. Mao is still suspicious of the dish when they sleep and sneaks into the kitchen where they find butchered snakes and other ingredients. They are then found and hidden by the family's daughter, who confirms that her parents used to be much healthier and happier before the chef's arrival. In the meantime, the father is too weak and unable to resist without the red congee that he becomes willing to sell the entire property to the chef for the congee. For breakfast in the next day, Mao and Si Lang serve a five-colored congee filled with a variety of natural detoxifiers like squash, mung beans and brown logans. The entire family is healed, and Mao and Si Lang are able to apprehend the chef before turning him to the authorities and resuming their journey.
19	"The Bridge of Love: Galaxy Noodles"; Transliteration: "Ai no Kakehashi: Gyarakushī Men" (Japanese: 愛のかけ橋・銀河(ギャラクシー)麺)	Ken'ichi Nishida	Yoshiyuki Suga	October 26, 1997
Mao and co's journey stops at Yunnan's capital, Kunming, where they finish a hearty meal from the top restaurant, Xinghan, but Si Lang misplaces their wallet, and they are thrown out by the restaurant staff. In their defense from the head chef Harry, comes a former staffer, Eagle. The commotion is found by Xinghan's owner, Master Yang and his daughter, Laya. Yang agrees to have Mao's group as temporary house helpers to pay their tab, while Laya is engaged with head chef Harry. While helping, Mei Li talks with Laya who reveals she previously loved Eagle and promised to meet together from the last year's Qixi Festival with Eagle promising her pearls, but her father was convinced Harry was the better candidate compared to the poorer Eagle, who ultimately never followed through with his promise. At the town, Eagle finds Harry philandering with other women a day before his marriage and is beaten up in a brawl. Mao finds Eagle, who reveals a pearl bangle he wished to present to Laya but lost the confidence to do so. In response, Mao creates a special dish for the marriage using a black broth of noodles filled with pearl powder from Eagle's bangle and to serve as symbolic stars of the Qixi Festival. Harry is outed by Mao for only marrying Laya for the restaurant's ownership, while Laya is able to stop Eagle from leaving and rekindle their love.
20	"The Ominous Black Chicken"; Transliteration: "Fukō o Yobu Kuroi Tori" (Japanese: 不幸を呼ぶ黒い鶏)	Shigeo Koshi	Nobuaki Kishima	November 2, 1997
The party has stopped at Henhouse village, a chicken breeding center of the province with an annual cook-off to showcase their quality. Mao, however, notices a destitute farm run by Tiya. Tiya owes her problems to her late brother, Kurou's cursed black chickens, which he spent most of his life accumulating regardless of debt. His later death to illness caused the town to turn against her as they believed the chickens to be an ill omen. Upon further studying the chickens, Mao finds that her brother was in the right, and promises to prove this in the annual cook-off. While the other restaurants present extravagant dishes such as roasted chicken, and cold cuts, Mao triumphs with his special chicken rice. Mao soon explains that the "cursed" chickens were actually prized Silkies known for their usage in stocks. Mao's dish would have his rice cooked inside the silkie in its own broth, resulting in it having the chicken's full flavor. The town changes their tune, and apologize to Tiya while recognizing the greatness of her brother's work. To celebrate, Tiya and Mao prepare to pay respects to Kurou and find Zhou Yu already there, as Kurou was one of his old friends. With Mao's journey complete, Zhou Yu takes the entire party back to Guangzhou.
21	"The Continent's Best Man! Yosen Shuka's Challenge"; Transliteration: "Tairiku Ichi no Otoko! Yōsen Shuka e no Chōsen" (Japanese: 大陸一の男！陽泉酒家への挑戦)	Makoto Fuchigami	Yoshiyuki Suga	November 16, 1997
Zhou Yu and Ruoh are preparing to leave for Beijing for a convention, and train Mao in running the restaurant during their absence. At the last minute, a new customer with a long pole arrives and demands "good food". Seeing that Mao was currently out, Si Lang takes it upon himself to make stir fried vegetables, but Mao returns and notices that Si Lang had forgotten to drain the vegetables with oil after frying to retain their moisture. The man angrily complains of the dish, and Mao promises to make a new order, taking up the man's challenge of a dish with three types eggs within 15 minutes. After the time has passed, Mao serves the man shumai, having chicken eggs in the shumai's skin, duck eggs for garnish, and crab roe mixed into the filling. Impressed, the man introduces himself as Xie Lu, a top dimsum chef hailing from Shanxi, and demands a duel with Mao.
22	"Flying Ace! Targeted Mao!"; Transliteration: "Gekitsui-ō! Hyōteki ni Sareta Mao!" (Japanese: 撃墜王！標的にされたマオ！)	Kunihisa Sugishima	Nobuaki Kishima	November 30, 1997
Because of his current responsibilities to the restaurant, Mao refuses Xie Lu's challenge, resulting in him angrily crashing the dining area until Zhou Yu and Ruoh arrive and encourage Mao to take the challenge as a chef. For their theme, Zhou Yu orders the two for dimsum that can serve fifty people. Xie Lu competes, using his pole to roll the dough slices into perfect skins, and splitting the pole into mallets to ground Jinhua ham for his filling. Mao, also picks Jinhua ham, prawns, and vegetables for his fillings, but Xie Lu finishes his dishes first.
23	"Shine! Big Bang Siu Mai"; Transliteration: "Kagayake! Biggu Ban Shū Mai" (Japanese: 輝け！大宇宙(ビッグバン)焼売)	Yutaka Kagawa	Nobuaki Kishima	December 7, 1997
Xie's shumai would uniquely split into four pockets of pork, eggs, vegetables, and shrimp in his golden ratio of 8-5-5-5 for the perfect balance. Mao is unable to think of a conventional solution to beat Xie, so he prepares a supersized shumai big enough to serve fifty people instead with the idea of tearing skin and making your own shumai from scratch. Despite using various cuts of pork, Mao had also arranged his cuts perfectly so that the meat would cook perfectly despite the size. After tasting the shumai for himself, Xie admits defeat. For acting without supervision, Si Lang is punished with having to give Ruoh a back massage.
24	"A Mysterious Invitation: The Masked Chef's Trap!"; Transliteration: "Nazo no Shōtaijō: Kamen Ryōrinin no Wana!" (Japanese: 謎の招待状・仮面料理人の罠！)	Masakatsu Iijima	Yoshiyuki Suga	December 14, 1997
Zhou Yu and Mei Li prepare for the death anniversary of Mei Li's mother, Mei Xiang when an arrow with an invitation from Guangdong's cooking association is sent to Zhou Yu. In no position to refuse, Zhou Yu takes Mao and Mei Li with him to the meal, but he and Mao realize that the other guests have been poisoned with cooked frogs disguised as pheasants. The cook turns out to be the masked Li Yan, Zhou Yu's old friend who also loved Mei Xiang. Li reveals that he has joined the Dark Cooking Society for revenge against Zhou, and demands a battle with three courses of lobsters in exchange for the poison's antidote. For the first challenge, both Li Yan and Zhou Yu prepare raw lobster blindfolded, but Li Yan poisons Zhou Yu with scorpions, causing him to collapse during their first course.
25	"Inherited Spirit: Bloody Battle at the Mansion!!"; Transliteration: "Hikitsugareta Supirittsu: Ijin-kan no Kessen!!" (Japanese: 引き継がれた魂(スピリッツ)・異人館の血戦！！)	Shigeo Koshi	Nobuaki Kishima	December 21, 1997
With Zhou Yu incapacitated, Mao takes over, and claims Li Yan cannot complete his revenge if he cannot beat Zhou Yu's star pupil. When Li Yan initially refuses, Mao immediately blindfolds himself and prepares an identical version of Li's dish immediately. Meanwhile, Ruoh becomes concerned for Zhou Yu's group as a storm is brewing and sends Si Lang to retrieve them. Unfortunately, Si Lang would be captured by Li's henchmen en route. The second course of deep fried lobster concludes with Li mixing grounded nuts to his coating when deep frying, but is one minute late in preparing his sauce. Mao, however, appears to have deep fried the entire lobster itself, but had hidden a cream sauce within the lobster, forcing Li to concede the second round. For their third round, Li and Mao compete with making a Lobster hot pot.
26	"The Greatest Trump Card! Joker's Laugh"; Transliteration: "Saikyō no Kirifuda! Azawarau Jōkā" (Japanese: 最強の切り札！あざ笑う悪魔(ジョーカー))	Ken'ichi Nishida	Yoshiyuki Suga	January 18, 1998
Li Yan and Mao's final battle begins with Li Yan using specially dried ingredients which he had intended to use for his first battle against Zhou Yu for Mei Xiang's hand in marriage. During their bout, Li reveals that when he battled Zhou Yu on that day, he was unable to cook properly after being poisoned, and later collapsed without completing any of his dishes. Mao counters Li by focusing on a vegetable broth with shiitake mushrooms as its base but could potentially have many impurities compared to the Li Yan's dried foods. For their judge, Li Yan orders Si Lang to be brought out to identify which of the two dishes belongs to Mao.
27	"Heroism! Grand Finale of Revenge!"; Transliteration: "Sōzetsu! Fukushū no Gurando Fināre!" (Japanese: 壮絶！復讐の最終楽章(グランドフィナーレ)！)	Kunihisa Sugishima	Nobuaki Kishima	January 25, 1998
Pressured by the gravity of the situation, Si Lang is unable to taste either dish prepared. Mao is able to reassure Si Lang, who then blindfolds himself to test the two dishes. Si Lang is quickly able to pick Mao's pot as the winner because Li Yan's pot was too rich in flavor of his dried foods, which resulted in the lobster's taste being diluted, while Mao's light choices for his stock allowed the lobster's taste to fully be seen. Thanks to this, Mao quickly gives the antidote to Mei Li and the others, while Zhou Yu recovers and immediately apologizes to Li Yan. Zhou Yu reveals on that faithful day, he had already promised to marry Mei Xiang behind the backs of Li Yan and their teacher. Mei Xiang, however, was still scared and resorted to poisoning Li Yan, but Zhou Yu could not admit that it was her fault as he knew Li Yan loved her as well, so he resolved to shoulder the blame instead. Zhou Yu, however, assured Li Yan that Mei Xiang held this regret to her death, and that he made her happy throughout her life. Content, Li Yan collapses after ingesting the poison himself and sets fire to his kitchen before warning Zhou Yu and Mao to escape, and that the Dark Cooking Society would not tolerate their actions. After escaping, Zhou Yu pays respects to his old friend, promising to raise Mao as a top chef.
28	"The Outdoor Cuisine of Friendship"; Transliteration: "Yūjō no Autodoa Ryōri" (Japanese: 友情の野外(アウトドア)料理)	Makoto Fuchigami	Yoshiyuki Suga	February 1, 1998
The Yang Spring Restaurant is closed for the day as Ruoh takes everyone on a fishing trip to the mountains. While everyone else is busy, Mao, Mei Li and Si Lang all get lost and coincidentally find Xie Lu wandering the area as well. Xie admits to becoming too invested in Guangzhou's food to leave and is staying in the area for an extended period. During this time, Mao recounts his experience with the Dark Cooking Society to Xie. To pass time, Mao and Xie work together to form fresh dumplings using the local carp and flowers, but Si Lang accidentally burns Xie's wallet. As a result, Xie is forced to open a temporary stall in Guangzhou with Si Lang as a helper until he can recoup his losses. After a full day's work and a night of drinking, a man attacks Xie and takes his metal pole for themselves.
29	"Underworld Hitman: Cold-Hearted Genius Leon"; Transliteration: "Ura Kara no Hittoman: Reiketsu no Tensai Reon" (Japanese: 裏からの刺客(ヒットマン)・冷血の天才レオン)	Yutaka Kagawa	Nobuaki Kishima	February 15, 1998
30	"Sharpness of Evil! Demonic Seven Star Knives!"; Transliteration: "Mashō no Kireaji! Yōtō Shichi Seitō!" (Japanese: 魔性の切れ味！妖刀七星刀！)	Masakatsu Iijima	Yoshiyuki Suga	February 22, 1998
31	"Four Chinese Regions Locked! Red Sea Bream Continental Seal"; Transliteration: "Yon Dai Chūka o Tojikomero! Madai Tairiku Fūji" (Japanese: 四大中華を閉じ込めろ！真鯛大陸封)	Ken'ichi Nishida	Nobuaki Kishima	March 1, 1998
32	"Ice and Flame! Clash!! A Chef's Soul"; Transliteration: "Kōri to Honō! Gekitotsu!! Ryōrinin Damashii" (Japanese: 氷と炎！激突！！料理人魂)	Shigeo Koshi	Yoshiyuki Suga	March 8, 1998
33	"The Legendary Utensil! The Secret of the Forever-Spirit Knife!!"; Transliteration: "Densetsu no Chū-gu! Eirei Tō no Himitsu!!" (Japanese: 伝説の厨具！永霊刀の秘密！！)	Kunihisa Sugishima	Nobuaki Kishima	March 15, 1998
34	"Evil City Shanghai! The Underworld's Declaration of War!!"; Transliteration: "Mato Shanhai! Ura Kara no Sensen Fukoku!!" (Japanese: 魔都上海！裏からの宣戦布告！！)	Ken'ichi Nishida	Nobuaki Kishima	March 22, 1998
35	"Huge Floating Cooking Arena! Magical Power of the Iron Arm Soup"; Transliteration: "Suijō Dai Tōmi-jō! Tetsuwan Sūpu no Maryoku" (Japanese: 水上大闘味場！鉄腕スープの魔力)	Yutaka Kagawa	Yoshiyuki Suga	April 19, 1998
36	"Sanche Special! Cold Jelly Soup"; Transliteration: "Sanche Tokusei! Reisei Nikogori Sūpu" (Japanese: サンチェ特製！冷製煮こごりスープ)	Masakatsu Iijima	Yoshiyuki Suga	April 26, 1998
37	"The Dim Sum King Lakon: 1,600 Year-Old Spirit-Calming Bun"; Transliteration: "Menten Kingu Rakon: Senroppyaku-nen no Chinkon Manjū" (Japanese: 面点王(キング)ラコン・千六百年の鎮魂饅頭)	Naoyasu Habu	Nobuaki Kishima	May 3, 1998
38	"Super Dim Sum Battle! The Ultimate Decision!!"; Transliteration: "Sūpā Tenshin Dai Gekitotsu! Kyūkyoku no Saitei!!" (Japanese: スーパー点心大激突！究極の裁定！！)	Ken'ichi Nishida	Yoshiyuki Suga	May 10, 1998
39	"Another Set of Seven Star Knives! Enigmatic Beauty Shan"; Transliteration: "Mō Hitotsu no Shichi Seitō! Nazo no Bijo Shan" (Japanese: もうひとつの七星刀！謎の美女シャン)	Yutaka Kagawa	Nobuaki Kishima	May 24, 1998
40	"Wake Up Leon! Destiny of a Chef"; Transliteration: "Mezameyo Reon! Ryōrinin no Shukumei" (Japanese: 目覚めよレオン！料理人の宿命)	Makoto Fuchigami	Yoshiyuki Suga	May 31, 1998
41	"Smash the Evil Blade! Soul of the Seven Star Knives!!"; Transliteration: "Jaken o Kudake! Tamashii no Shichi Seitō!!" (Japanese: 邪剣を砕け！魂の七星刀！！)	Waruro Suzuki	Nobuaki Kishima	June 7, 1998
42	"Demon of Vengeance Shao An! Conclusion of Destiny"; Transliteration: "Fukushū Ki Shō An! Innen no Ketsumatsu" (Japanese: 復讐鬼ショウアン！因縁の結末)	Naoyasu Habu	Yoshiyuki Suga	June 14, 1998
43	"Mao's Real Ability! Magical Panda Tofu"; Transliteration: "Mao no Jitsuryoku! Majikaru Panda Dōfu" (Japanese: マオの実力！大魔術(マジカル)熊猫(パンダ)豆腐)	Ken'ichi Nishida	Nobuaki Kishima	June 21, 1998
44	"Shocking Verdict! In the Palm of the Fairy"; Transliteration: "Shōgeki no Hantei! Sennyo no Te no Hira" (Japanese: 衝撃の判定！仙女の手のひら)	Yutaka Kagawa	Yoshiyuki Suga	June 28, 1998
45	"The Yangtze River Burns! Shao An Dies in the Ocean"; Transliteration: "Chōkō Enjō! Shō An Taikai ni Shisu" (Japanese: 長江炎上！ショウアン大海に死す)	Makoto Fuchigami	Nobuaki Kishima	July 26, 1998
46	"Save Shell! A Torrent of Noodles!!"; Transliteration: "Sheru o Sukue! Men no Arashi!!" (Japanese: シェルを救え！麺のあらし！！)	Waruro Suzuki	Yoshiyuki Suga	August 2, 1998
47	"The Deity Descends?! Miraculous Spiritual Deity Copperware"; Transliteration: "Majin Kōrin!? Kiseki no Masei Dōki" (Japanese: 魔神降臨！？奇跡の魔聖銅器)	Ken'ichi Nishida	Nobuaki Kishima	August 9, 1998
48	"Shooting Star of Heaven! Special Comet Fried Rice"; Transliteration: "Ama Kakeru Hoshi! Tokusei Kometto Chāhan" (Japanese: 天かける星！特製彗星(コメット)炒飯)	Naoyasu Habu	Nobuaki Kishima	August 16, 1998
49	"Labyrinth of Darkness! Soul-Connecting Serving of Porridge"; Transliteration: "Yami no Meikyū! Kokoro o Tsunagu Ippai no Kayu" (Japanese: 闇の迷宮！心をつなぐ一杯の粥)	Yutaka Kagawa	Nobuaki Kishima	August 23, 1998
50	"Imperial Capital Peking! The Underworld Cooking Society Bares its Fangs"; Transliteration: "Teito Pekin! Kiba o Muku Ura Ryōri-kai" (Japanese: 帝都北京！牙をむく裏料理界)	Makoto Fuchigami	Yoshiyuki Suga	August 30, 1998
51	"Secret Plan of Fei the Genius! Neo Manchu–Han Imperial Feast"; Transliteration: "Tensai Fei no Hisaku! Neo Mankanzenseki" (Japanese: 天才フェイの秘策！ネオ満漢全席)	Waruro Suzuki	Yoshiyuki Suga	September 6, 1998
52	"Huge Reversal! Heroic Chefs of Glory"; Transliteration: "Dai Gyakuten! Eikō no Yuchūshi-tachi" (Japanese: 大逆転！栄光の勇厨師たち)	Ken'ichi Nishida	Yoshiyuki Suga	September 13, 1998

==== 2019 series ====
In 2019, it was announced that Shin Chūka Ichiban!, or True Cooking Master Boy manga would receive an anime television series adaptation produced by NAS, with animation by Production I.G. It is directed and written by Itsuro Kawasaki, with characters designs by Saki Hasegawa and music composed by Jun Ichikawa. The series aired from October 12 to December 28, 2019, on MBS's Animeism programming block.

After the final episode, it was announced that the series will be receiving a second season, with the staff and cast are reprising their roles. The second season aired from January 12 to March 30, 2021, on Tokyo MX, MBS, and BS-NTV.

Crunchyroll streamed the series outside of Asia. China Film Animation licensed the series in mainland China and Southeast Asia, and is streaming it on iQIYI.

Remow licensed the series in English and started streaming it on its It's Anime YouTube channel.

===== Season 1 =====
No.	Title	Directed by	Written by	Original release date
1	"Dream Maker"; Transliteration: "Yume o Tsugu Mono" (Japanese: 夢を継ぐ者)	Itsuro Kawasaki	Itsuro Kawasaki	October 12, 2019
2	"Dim Sum Master"; Transliteration: "Tokkyū Mentenshi" (Japanese: 特級面点師)	Takashi Andō	Itsuro Kawasaki	October 19, 2019
3	"The Strange Invitation"; Transliteration: "Kimyō na Shōtaijō" (Japanese: 奇妙な招待状)	Eiichi Kuboyama	Itsuro Kawasaki	October 26, 2019
4	"Pot of Grudges"; Transliteration: "Onnen no Nabe" (Japanese: 怨念の鍋)	Tadao Itō	Itsuro Kawasaki	November 2, 2019
5	"Ambition of the Cooking Underworld"; Transliteration: "Ura Ryōri-kai no Yabō" (Japanese: 裏料理界の野望)	Seo Hye-Jin	Itsuro Kawasaki	November 9, 2019
6	"The Seventh Knife"; Transliteration: "Nana-banme no Hōchō" (Japanese: 七番目の包丁)	Naoki Matsuura	Itsuro Kawasaki	November 16, 2019
7	"Two Successors"; Transliteration: "Futari no Keishōsha" (Japanese: 二人の継承者)	Yoshitaka Nagaoka	Itsuro Kawasaki	November 23, 2019
8	"The Eight Legendary Utensils"; Transliteration: "Densetsu no Hachū-gu" (Japanese: 伝説の八厨具)	Michita Shiraishi	Itsuro Kawasaki	November 30, 2019
9	"Shanghai, City of Devils"; Transliteration: "Mato Shanhai" (Japanese: 魔都 上海)	Itsuro Kawasaki, Shintarō Itoga	Itsuro Kawasaki	December 7, 2019
10	"Clash of the Super Dim Sum"; Transliteration: "Sūpā Tenshin Dai Gekitotsu!" (Japanese: 超点心大激突！)	Yasuyuki Fuse	Daishirō Tanimura	December 14, 2019
11	"Clash of the Two Seven Star Knives"; Transliteration: "Gekitotsu! Futatsu no "Shichi Seitō"" (Japanese: 激突！二つの『七星刀』)	Yukio Kuroda, Reina Igawa	Itsuro Kawasaki	December 21, 2019
12	"Man of Destiny"; Transliteration: "Unmei no Otoko" (Japanese: 運命の男)	Motomasa Maeda, Ari Fujisaki, Oyunamu, Hito Tadano, Hiroki Moritomo	Itsuro Kawasaki	December 28, 2019

===== Season 2 =====
No. overall	No. in season	Title	Directed by	Written by	Original release date
13	1	"The Transcendental Tofu Battle!"; Transliteration: "Chōzetsu Dōfu Shōbu!" (Japanese: 超絶豆腐勝負！)	Ichirō Ōtaka, Hito Tadano, Gong Zhenhua	Itsuro Kawasaki	January 12, 2021
14	2	"Outstretched Hand"; Transliteration: "Sashinoberareta Te" (Japanese: 差し伸べられた手)	Komurakata Kōji	Itsuro Kawasaki	January 19, 2021
15	3	"Advent of the Devil"; Transliteration: "Majin Kōrin" (Japanese: 魔神降臨)	Hiroyuki Okuno	Daishirō Tanimura	January 26, 2021
16	4	"River of Fire"; Transliteration: "Bakuen no Kawa" (Japanese: 爆炎の河)	Michita Shiraishi	Daishirō Tanimura	February 2, 2021
17	5	"At the End of the Yangtze River"; Transliteration: "Chōkō no Hate ni" (Japanese: 長江の果てに)	Motomasa Maeda, Gong Zhenhua	Itsuro Kawasaki	February 9, 2021
18	6	"Calamity at the Chrysanthemum Tower"; Transliteration: "Kikkarō no Ihen" (Japanese: 菊下楼の異変)	Eiichi Kuboyama	Daishirō Tanimura	February 16, 2021
19	7	"The Feelings Entrusted to the Duck"; Transliteration: "Ahiru ni Takusareta Omoi" (Japanese: 鴨子にたくされた想い)	Shigeru Fukase	Daishirō Tanimura	February 23, 2021
20	8	"Like the Phoenix"; Transliteration: "Fushichō no Gotoku" (Japanese: 不死鳥のごとく)	Masahito Otani	Daishirō Tanimura	March 2, 2021
21	9	"Dazzling Dunhuang"; Transliteration: "Genwaku no Tonkō" (Japanese: 眩惑の敦煌)	Hidehiko Kadota	Itsuro Kawasaki	March 9, 2021
22	10	"The Desert Sun"; Transliteration: "Sabaku no Taiyō" (Japanese: 砂漠の太陽)	Yoshitaka Nagaoka	Itsuro Kawasaki	March 16, 2021
23	11	"The Limitless Hero"; Transliteration: "Mugen no Eiyū" (Japanese: 無限の英雄)	Hiroyuki Okuno	Daishirō Tanimura	March 23, 2021
24	12	"Creators of an Era"; Transliteration: "Jidai o Tsukuru Monotachi" (Japanese: 時代を創る者たち)	Komurakata Kōji	Daishirō Tanimura; Itsuro Kawasaki	March 30, 2021

==== Theme songs ====
===== Chūka Ichiban! =====
Opening themes

1. "Sky" (空, Sora) by Maki Ohguro (1–18)
2. "I Can't Breathe: Now I Can Breathe" (息もできない〜Now I can breathe〜, Iki mo Dekinai Nau Ai Kyan Burēsu) by Zard (19–36)
3. "If Only You Were Here" (君さえいれば, Kimi Sae Ireba) by Deen (37–52)

Ending themes

1. "Met in the Blue Sky" (青い空に出逢えた, Aoi Sora ni Deaeta) by Arisa Tsujio (辻尾有紗, Tsujio Arisa) (1–20)
2. "Mineral" (ミネラル, Mineraru) by Kaori Nanao (七緒香, Nanao Kaori) (21–36)
3. "Free as the Wind" (風のように自由, Kaze no Yō ni Jiyū) by Keiko Utoku (37–52)

===== Shin Chūka Ichiban! =====
Opening themes

1. "Theory of Light" (光福論, Kōfukuron) by Qajiff (クアイフ, Kuaifu) (season 1)
2. "Tough Heart" by Aika Kobayashi (season 2)

Ending themes

1. "Paradigm Shift" (パラダイムシフト, Paradaimu Shifuto) by Brian the Sun (season 1)
2. "Colors" by Humbreaders (season 2)

== See also ==
- Dark cuisine or hei an liao li, a term coined from the series for bizarre food combinations
- The God of Cookery (1996), a Stephen Chow cooking film
- Yakitate!! Japan (2002 debut), a cooking manga series
- Food Wars!: Shokugeki no Soma (2012 debut), a cooking manga series
