= Angel's Frypan =

Manga

- Cover of the first volume

天使のフライパン
- Genre: Cooking
- Manga
- Written by: Etsushi Ogawa
- Published by: Kodansha
- Magazine: Comic Bom Bom
- Original run: 2006 – 2007
- Volumes: 5

Angel's Frypan (Japanese: 天使のフライパン, Hepburn: Tenshi no Furaipan) is a Japanese manga series written and illustrated by Etsushi Ogawa. It was serialized in Kodansha's Comic Bom Bom, which was aimed at elementary-aged boys. The manga received the 2007 Kodansha Manga Award in the children's category.

== Plot ==
Kunimi Satoshi stayed at home and did nothing for a year after his father had gone missing. However meeting with his classmate, Tsuji Keita, he somehow manage to graduate middle school, and to become a master chef, he decide to work in Teito hotel, one of highest hotel known for cooking.
