= Jing Gao =

Chinese-American entrepreneur

- Born: 1987 or 1988 (age 37–38); Chengdu, Sichuan, China
- Occupation: Entrepreneur
- Known for: Fly By Jing

Jing Gao is a Chinese-American entrepreneur. She founded the chili crisp brand Fly By Jing.

== Early life and education ==
Gao was born in Chengdu, China, raised in Europe, and attended school in Canada. Her father was a professor. While growing up in Europe, she used the name Jenny rather than Jing in an attempt to fit in, returning to using Jing around 2021.

== Career ==
After graduating from college, Gao worked as a brand manager for Procter & Gamble. She worked for BlackBerry. She moved back to Sichuan Province in her early twenties and lived there for 10 years while working for a tech company. While living in China she became interested in Chinese food culture, eventually quitting her job to train in restaurants. She opened a restaurant, Baoism, in 2014 and in 2016 hosted a pop-up supper club branded as Fly By Jing. She created a blog, Jing Theory, and wrote about food for other publications. She developed a line of products under the brand name Fly By Jing, a reference to China's small street stalls that are so popular they are said to attract people like flies, for the Chinese market.

After a Kickstarter campaign in 2018 with a goal of $35,000 raised $120,000, Gao relocated to the US in 2019 to start Fly By Jing as a direct-to-consumer company marketing chili crisp. In 2020 the pandemic created an increased interest in homecooking, and a feature article about chili crisp in the New York Times that mentioned Fly By Jing increased sales of the product.

In 2023 trade publication Nosh said Gao's products had "touched off the chili crisp craze that launched a million TikTok recipes during the pandemic".

Her first cookbook, The Book of Sichuan Chili Crisp, was published in 2023 by Ten Speed Press. The book's photographer, Yudi Echevarria, won a James Beard Award for her work on the book.

== Personal life ==
As of 2023 Gao lived in Los Angeles.
