= Chili oil =

Condiment made from chili peppers

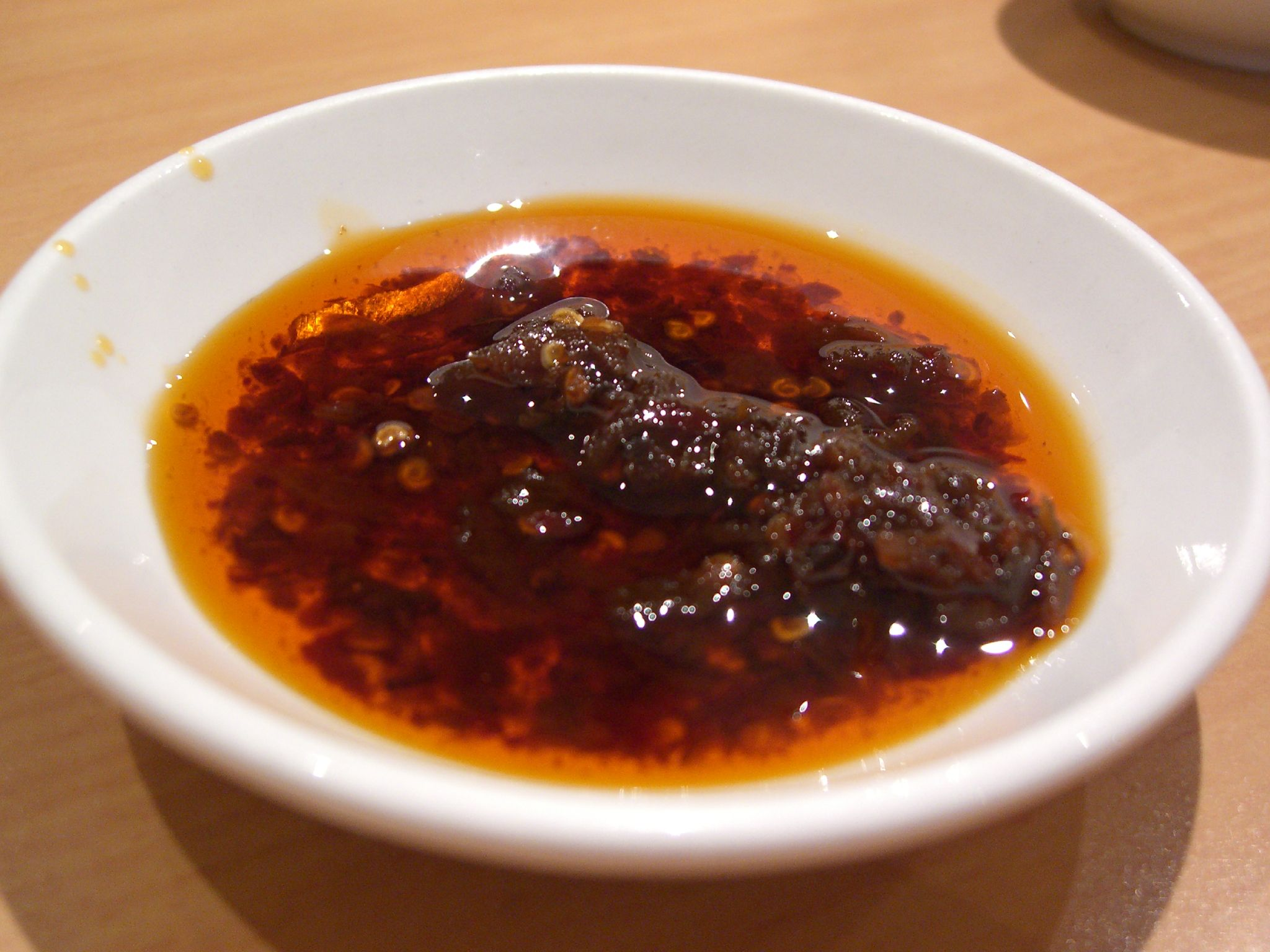
- Alternative names: Hot chili oil, hot oil
- Type: Dip
- Main ingredients: Vegetable oil, chili peppers

Chili oil

Chinese name
- Traditional Chinese: 辣油, 紅椒油, 紅油, 辣椒油, 紅辣椒油, 油潑辣子
- Simplified Chinese: 辣油, 红椒油, 红油, 辣椒油, 红辣椒油, 油泼辣子
Transcriptions
Standard Mandarin
- Hanyu Pinyin: làyóu, hóngjiāo yóu, hóng yóu, làjiāo yóu, hóng làjiāo yóu, yóu pō làzi

Vietnamese name
- Vietnamese alphabet: ớt sa tế

Thai name
- Thai: น้ำมันพริก
- RTGS: nam man phrik

Korean name
- Hangul: 고추기름
Transcriptions
- Revised Romanization: gochu gireum
- McCune–Reischauer: kochu kirŭm

Japanese name
- Kanji: ラー油, 辣油
Transcriptions
- Romanization: rāyu

Lao name
- Lao: ນ້ຳມັນໝາກເຜັດ

Khmer name
- Khmer: ទឹកម្ទេស

Chili oil or chile oil is a condiment made from vegetable oil that has been infused with chili peppers. Different types of oil and hot peppers are used, and other components may also be included. It is commonly used in Chinese cuisine, Mexico, Italy, and elsewhere. It is particularly popular in Chinese cuisine, especially western Chinese cuisines, such as Sichuan cuisine, Hunan cuisine, Guizhou cuisine, and Shaanxi cuisine, where it is used as an ingredient in cooked dishes, as well as a condiment. It is sometimes used as a dip for meat and dim sum. It is also employed in the Korean Chinese noodle soup dish jjamppong. A closely related condiment in Chinese cuisine is chili crisp, which contains edible chunks of food and chilis in oil.

Chili oil is typically red in color. It is made from vegetable oil, often soybean oil or sesame oil, although olive oil or other oils may be used. Other spices may be included, such as Sichuan pepper, garlic, or paprika. Commercial preparations may include other kinds of oil, water, dried garlic, soy sauce, and sugar. Recipes targeted to Western cooks also suggest other popular oils, such as rapeseed, grapeseed or peanut, and any dried or fresh chili peppers. The solids typically settle to the bottom of the container in which it is stored. When using chili oil, the cook or diner may choose how much of the solids to use; sometimes only the oil is used, without any solids.

Chili oil is easy to prepare, and is also commercially available in glass jars or bottles.

== Varieties and regional use ==
=== China ===
Chili oil has various names in China and comes in many different types depending on the region. It is called yóu pō là zǐ (油泼辣子, chili pepper splashed with oil) in Shaanxi province and là yóu (辣油, spicy oil) or hóng yóu (紅油, red oil) in Sichuan. Among those names the most popular one is là jiāo yóu (辣椒油, chili pepper oil).

In China, chili oil is prepared basically by pouring hot vegetable oil slowly on chili pepper powder or chopped chili pepper. Many other ingredients can be added alongside to enrich flavor, such as Chinese black vinegar, minced garlic, dried shrimp, dried ginger skin, sesame seeds, sesame oil, Sichuan peppercorn, cinnamon, star anise and bay leaf. The popular chili oil brand Lao Gan Ma is based on chili oils from Guizhou. There are also many condiments derived from chili oil, such as chili oil and douchi (豆豉, fermented black soybeans).

=== Japan ===
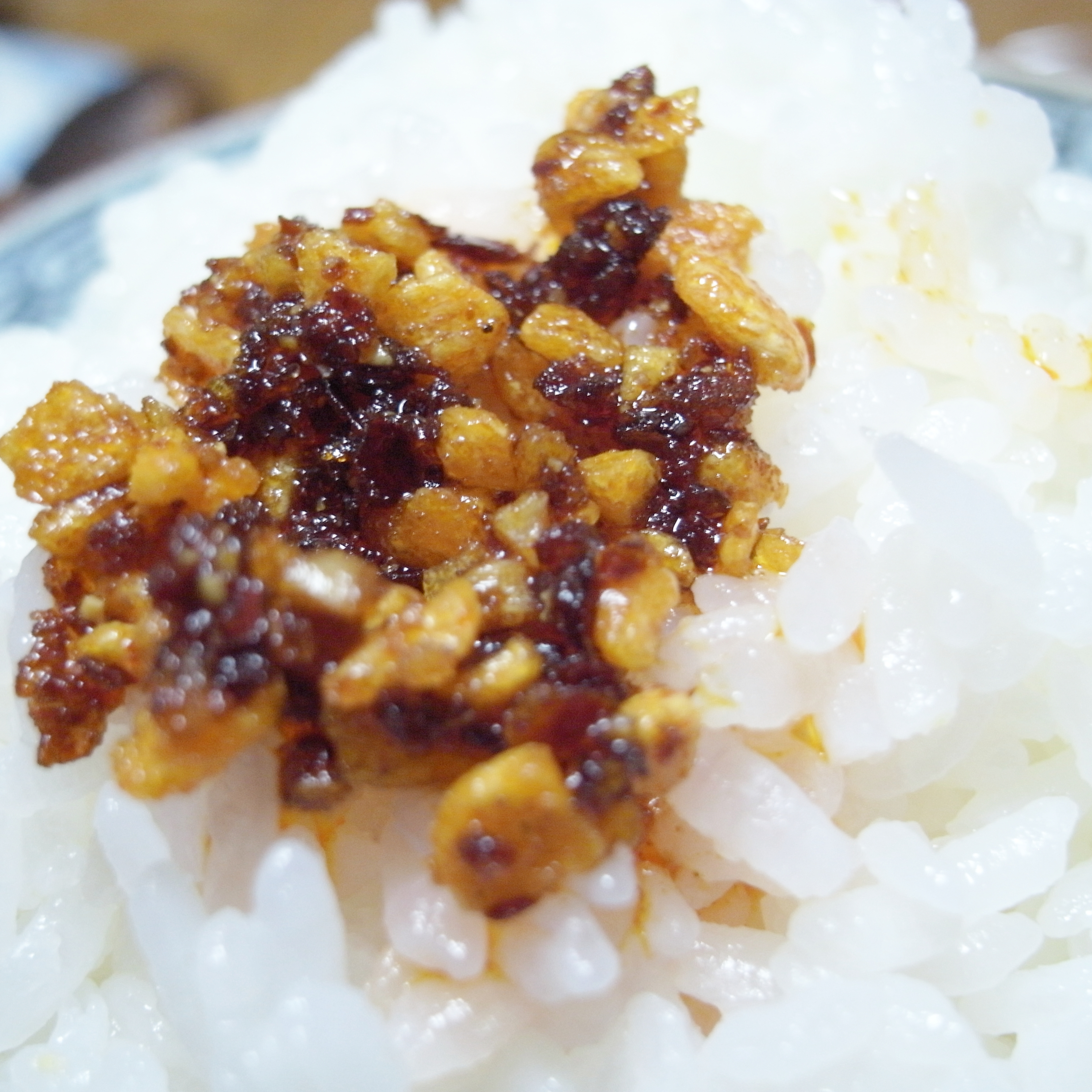
Taberu rāyu on top of steamed rice

The Japanese variety of Chinese chili oil is known as rāyu (ラー油 or 辣油), used in Japan as a cooking ingredient or as a condiment. It is typically a clear, chili-infused sesame oil, and the chopped chili pepper used is typically red, imparting a reddish tint to the oil. Other ingredients used may include soy oil, corn oil, dried aloe, ginger, guava leaves, leek leaves, paprika, and turmeric.

A new type of product known as taberu rāyu (食べるラー油 or -辣油; literally, "rāyu for eating") was introduced in 2009 and is based on the Chinese chili crisp. It is less spicy-hot, and includes chunks of food, such as fried garlic and fried onion, in the oil.

=== Italy ===
The Italian variety of chili oil (olio di peperoncino) originates in the southern region of Calabria. It is often added to dishes, sauces, salads, or served with cheeses and antipasto. This variety of chili oil uses olive oil as a base and has a unique brine flavor. The peperoncino is a popular food item in Calabria.

=== Mexico ===
Mexico's version is called salsa macha and originates in the state of Veracruz. It is variable in composition, consisting of either a neutral oil, like avocado or olive oil, sauteed garlic, and one or more of several different types of chiles, including Chile de Arbol, Chipotle, and Guajillo. Nuts and seeds such as peanuts, sunflower, sesame and/or pumpkin are also added. Sometimes vinegar or sugar are added as well.

=== Portugal ===
Portuguese chili oil is made by cold (refrigerated) infusion of dried red chili peppers in olive oil in a tightly capped bottle for one month.

=== Turkey ===
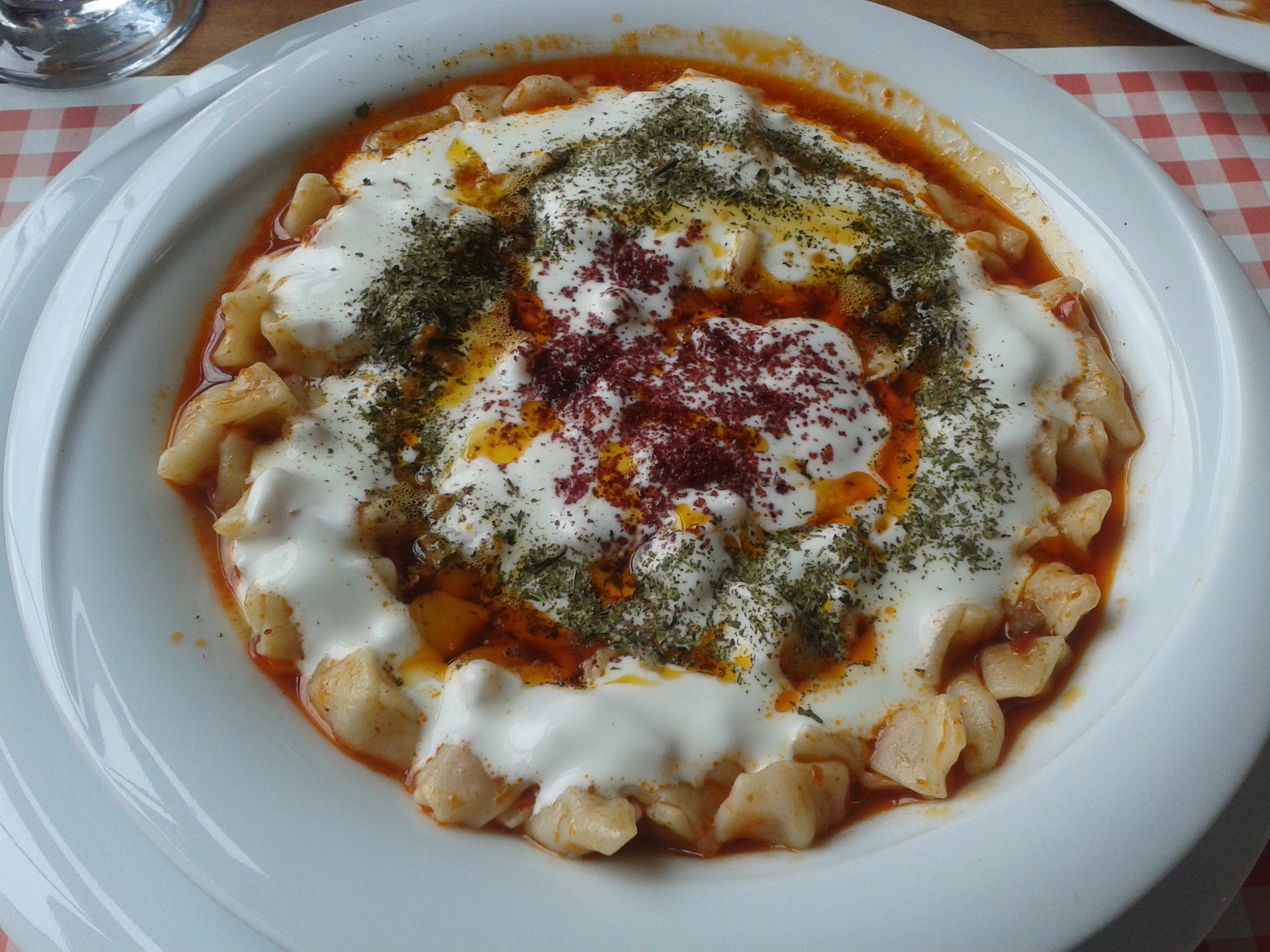
Turkish mantı with garlic yogurt and red pepper paste infused oil

Chili and pepper infused oils are used widely as a condiment in Turkish cuisine. Turkish dumpling mantı is served with chili infused oil poured over the garlic yogurt sauce. The oil is prepared with mixing chili paste (Turkish: biber salçası) and certain spices and herbs such as black pepper, chili flakes or powder, dried mint and cumin.

Strained yogurt is also topped with sizzling oil infused with dried hot chili peppers. This dish is called atom in Turkish and typically served as a meze.

== See also ==
- Chili sauce
- Chili crisp
- List of condiments
- List of dips
- XO sauce
- Peperoncino
