= Lao Gan Ma =

Chinese brand of chili sauce

- Alternative names: LAOGANMA
- Type: Chili sauce
- Place of origin: Guizhou, China
- Created by: Tao Huabi
- Invented: 1984
- Main ingredients: Chili peppers

Lao Gan Ma
- Simplified Chinese: 老干妈
- Traditional Chinese: 老乾媽
- Literal meaning: old godmother
Transcriptions
Standard Mandarin
- Hanyu Pinyin: Lǎo gān mā
- IPA: [làʊ kán.má]

Lao Gan Ma (Chinese: 老干妈; pinyin: Lǎo Gān Mā; also called Laoganma) is a brand of chili sauces made in China and sold in over 30 countries. Lao Gan Ma is credited with popularizing Chinese chili oil and chili crisp toppings in the Western world, and it has inspired other Chinese-American chili-based toppings.

== History ==
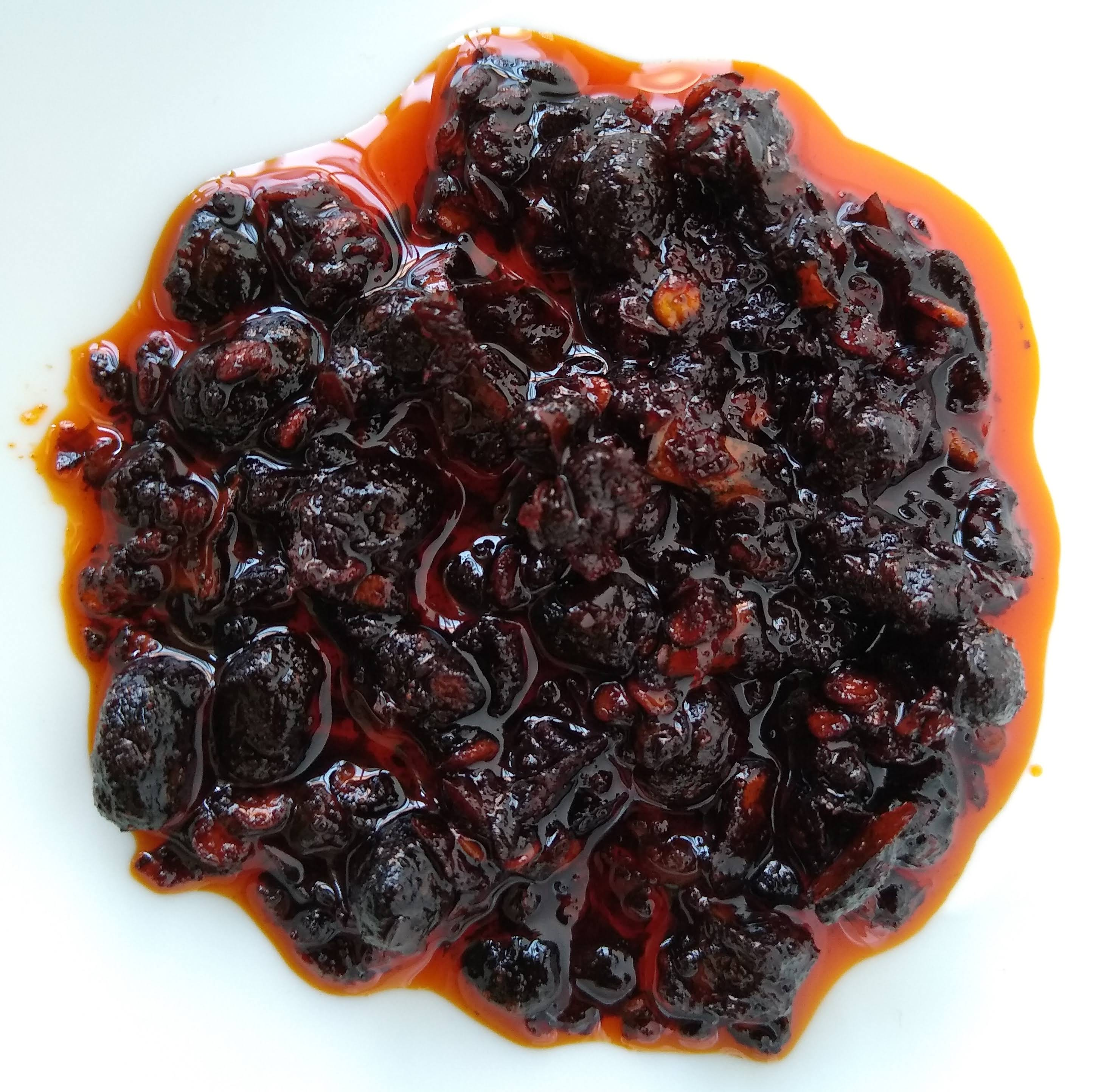
Lao Gan Ma tofu chili sauce

Tao Huabi is said to have created her chili sauce in 1984, at the age of 37. In 1989, she set up a noodle restaurant in Guiyang, Guizhou. When she noticed the popularity of her hot sauces, she converted the restaurant into a specialty shop to sell her sauces, particularly chili oil sauce. In 1994, she borrowed two houses of the CPC Yunguan Village Committee in the Nanming District and employed 40 people to work in her new sauce factory. Tao's son Li Guishan became the company's first president, in 1997.

In January 2011, Women of China magazine reported that the company had 1.3 billion yuan (US$190 million) in assets and 2,000 employees. The sauce is produced commercially by Laoganma Special Flavour Foodstuffs Company, which was established in 1997. The condiment is available outside of China, including in the United States.

=== Counterfeiters ===
Despite the brand's success upon launch, it struggled with counterfeits with similar packaging in China, who proliferated due to the government rejecting Lao Gan Ma's application for a trademark. Tao campaigned against these counterfeiters, and in 2001, the high court of Beijing ruled that similar products could not use the "Lao Gan Ma" name nor imitate its packaging; Tao received 400,000 yuan in compensation. Her trademark application was approved in 2003, after a lengthy lawsuit against a counterfeiter based in Hunan.

=== Recipe change and 2016–18 sales decline ===
After 2016, Lao Gan Ma's sales in China declined for two years in a row. According to reports, the company's annual income reached 4.549 billion yuan in 2016, 4.447 billion yuan in 2017, and 4.389 billion yuan in 2018. It was speculated that this was partly due to a change in the recipe in 2011, with a switch from Guizhou chili peppers to a cheaper variety from Henan. Guizhou chilies are large in size, full in body, and contain more water, making them more suitable for making hot sauce. The decline was reversed in 2019, after Tao resumed managing the company and switched back to using Guizhou chili.

=== 2019 Tencent lawsuit ===
In 2019, the technology company Tencent sued Lao Gan Ma for several million yuan over unpaid advertising fees based on a contract that had been forged by three scammers attempting to obtain gift codes for the video game Speed Drifters. The nature of the case was revealed following an investigation, and all three scammers were arrested in 2020, leading to a settlement between Lao Gan Ma and Tencent.

== Products ==
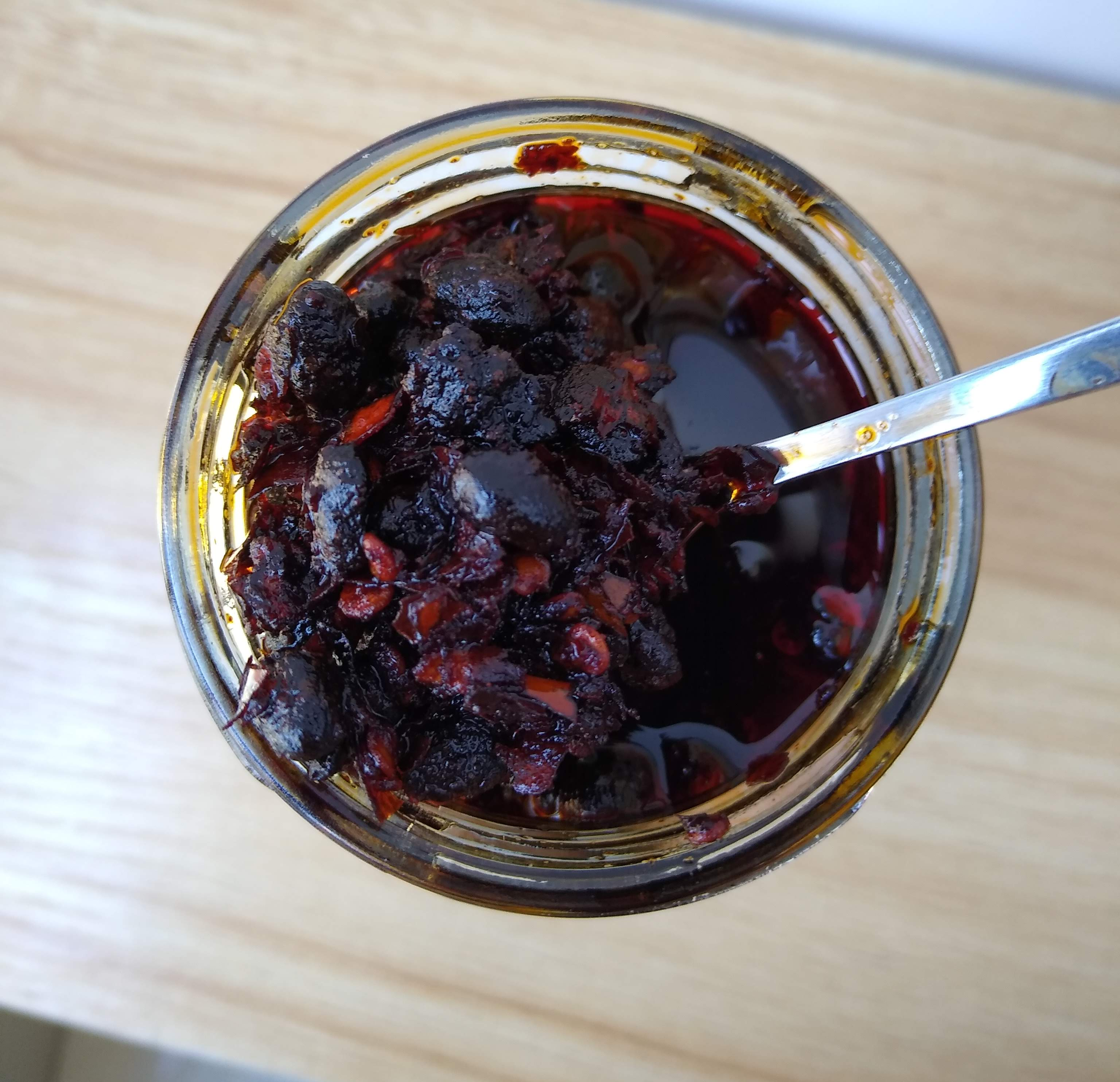
Lao Gan Ma being spooned out of a jar

Lao Gan Ma produces a variety of flavors, such as Spicy Chili Crisp, Chili Oil with Black Bean, Fried Chili in Oil, Hot Chili Sauce, and Spicy Bean Paste.

== See also ==
- List of Chinese sauces
- List of condiments
- List of hot sauces
