= Frankie Gaw =

Taiwanese American cook and author

Frankie Gaw is a Taiwanese American cook and author.

== Personal life ==
Gaw was born in Plano, Texas to immigrant parents from Taiwan with Frankie growing up in Cincinnati, Ohio. As a child he was given the nickname “Little Fat Boy Frankie” or “Xiao Pang”.

Gaw is gay and lives in Seattle.

== Career ==
Gaw began blogging about food under the handle "Little Fat Boy".

Gaw published First Generation, a Taiwanese American cookbook, in 2022. The book contains recipes from Gaw's childhood growing up in the American midwest. It explores what it means to grow up between two different cultures. The book is dedicated to his grandfather.

Gaw hosts a social media series called "Turning American Classics Asian".

In 2023, he was nominated for an IACP Award in the Individual Instagram Account category.

In 2024 Gaw partnered with the Singapore Tourism Board to create a series called “Savoring Singapore”.

In 2025, he won a James Beard Award in the Social Media Account category. Gaw collaborated with Fly By Jing to launch a chili crisp ketchup.
