= Etsushi Ogawa =

Japanese manga artist

- 小川 悦司
- Born: 23 February 1969 (age 57); Niigata Prefecture, Japan
- Occupations: Manga writer and illustrator
- Awards: Won the 31st Kodansha Manga Award for children's manga (2007)

Etsushi Ogawa (小川 悦司, Ogawa Etsushi; born 23 February 1969 in Niigata Prefecture, Japan) is a Japanese manga writer and illustrator. Almost all of his works center around the culinary arts. He graduated from Keio University with a degree in economics. Ogawa is most famous for the manga Chūka Ichiban, which was made into an anime.

In 2007, Ogawa won the 31st Kodansha Manga Award for children's manga for Tenshi no Frypan.

== Works ==
- Chūka Ichiban! (1995, Kodansha, Weekly Shōnen Magazine)
- Jipangu Hououden (2001, Kodansha, Weekly Shōnen Magazine) (author Kazutoshi Ozasa)
- Food Hunter Futaraiden (2004, Kodansha, Weekly Shōnen Magazine) (author Kazutoshi Ozasa)
- Bakumatsu Futaraiden (2005, Kodansha, Magazine Special)
- Tenshi no Frypan (2006, Kodansha, Comic Bom Bom)
- Astraia no Tenbin (2008, Kodansha, Monthly Afternoon) (author Ichiro Takeuchi)
- Asakusa-bito (2012, Nihon Bungeisha, Weekly Manga Goraku) (author Masaharu Nabeshima)
