= Disgusting Food Museum =

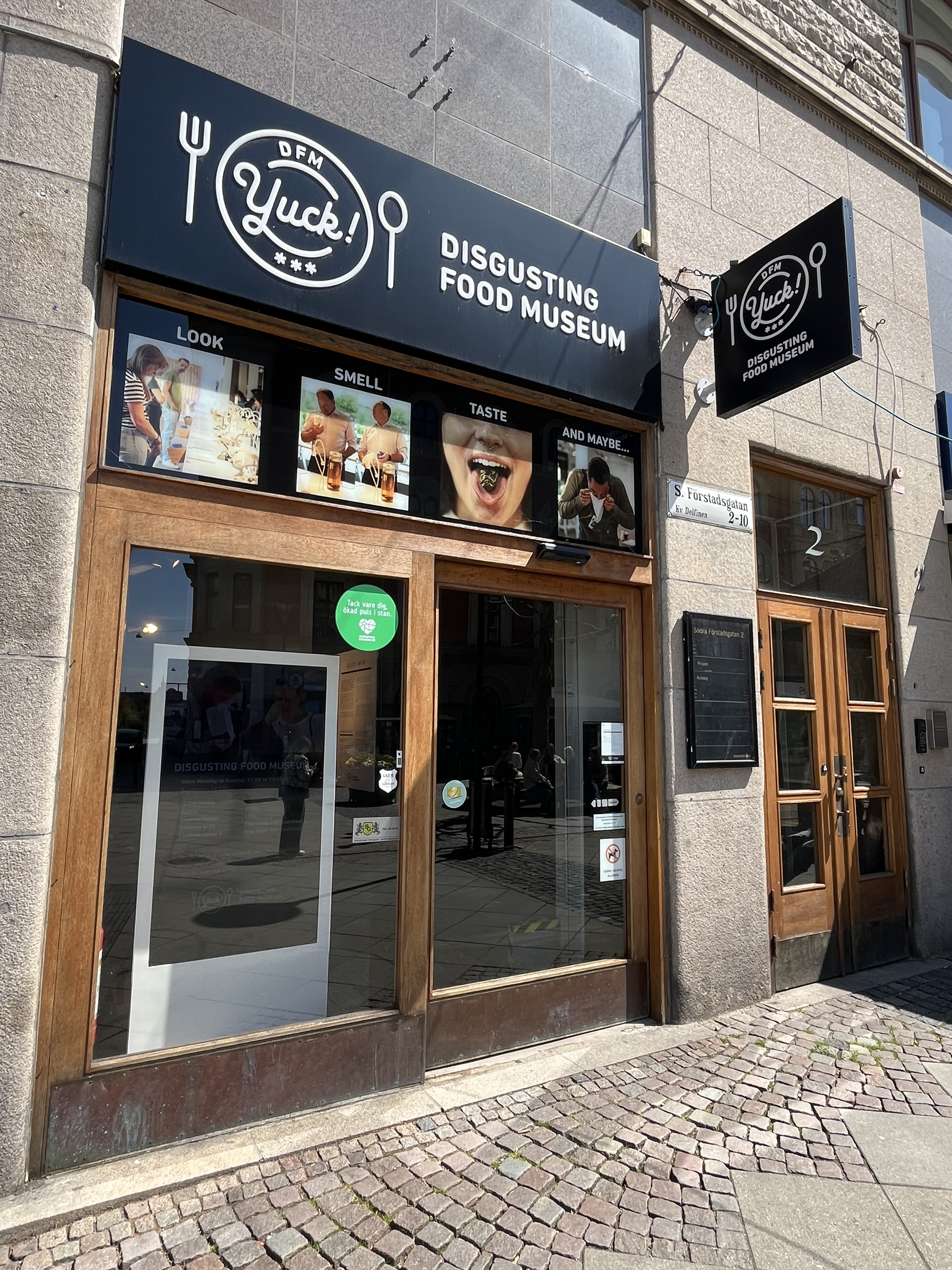
- Location: Södra Förstadsgatan 2, Malmö, Sweden
- Coordinates: 55°36′04″N 13°00′05″E
- Type: Food museum
- Website: disgustingfoodmuseum.com

Disgusting Food Museum is a museum exhibiting disgusting food from around the world. The museum was located in Slagthuset MMX in Malmö from 29 October 2018 – 27 January 2019 and is now located in Södra Förstadsgatan 2, Malmö since the summer of 2021. The exhibition contains around 80 different food items from around the world, including roasted guinea pig from Peru, Casu martzu cheese from Sardinia and surströmming from Sweden.

The museum has been featured in news media including The New York Times, Washington Post, Vox, Lonely Planet, Metro, Atlas Obscura, New Yorker among others.
