= Tao Huabi =

Chinese entrepreneur (born 1947)

- 陶华碧
- Born: January 1947 (age 79); Meitan County, Guizhou, China
- Occupation: Entrepreneur
- Known for: Lao Gan Ma
- Children: 2

Chinese name
- Simplified Chinese: 陶华碧
- Traditional Chinese: 陶華碧
Transcriptions
Standard Mandarin
- Hanyu Pinyin: Táo Huábì
- Wade–Giles: T'ao Hua-pi

Tao Huabi (Chinese: 陶华碧; born January 1947) is a Chinese entrepreneur, best known as the founder of the chili sauce brand Lao Gan Ma ("Old Godmother").

== Biography ==
Tao was born in a poverty-stricken village in Meitan County, Guizhou, in January 1947. She was the eighth girl in the family and was not taught how to read or write. During the Great Chinese Famine, she dug for wild vegetables and tried various ways to eat plant roots using whatever she had to try to make the little food her family had taste better.

At the age of 20, Tao married an accountant in a local geological team. In time the couple had two sons: Li Guishan (李贵山) and Li Hui (李辉). Not long after, her husband became sick, obliging Tao to earn money to cover her husband's medical costs and support their sons. She went to Guangzhou to find a factory job as a migrant worker, but after her husband died, she returned to Guizhou to care for her children. She began to sell rice curd and vegetables in a street stall.

In 1989, Tao opened up her own restaurant in Guiyang, Guizhou, where she sold simple noodles with spicy hot sauce with soybeans. She became known as a "godmother" to poor students as she would always give them discounts and some extra food when they could not pay for the food. Her restaurant began to gain popularity, particularly for its sauce. Customers would come to purchase the sauce by itself. In the early 1990s, more truck drivers passed by Tao's shop due to the construction of a new highway nearby; she started giving out her sauces for free for the truckers to take home, marketing her sauce by word of mouth.

By late 1994, she stopped selling noodles and turned her restaurant into a specialty store to sell her sauces, primarily her chili oil sauce. In 1994, she borrowed two houses of the Yunguan Village Committee of the Chinese Communist Party (CCP) in the Nanming District, recruited forty workers, and started her own sauce factory. By 1997, the company was officially listed and open for business. Though the brand was successful almost immediately after launching, it struggled to deal with competing brands with similar packaging. In 2001, the high court in Beijing finally ruled that other similar products could neither use the "Lao Gan Ma" name nor imitate its packaging. Tao received 400,000 RMB (60,000 USD) in compensation.

Tao is also a member of the CCP and is politically active as a representative of the standing Committee of the Guizhou Provincial People's Congress.

According to Chinese media, Tao reportedly retired in 2014. Li Hui is no longer on the list of Lao Gan Ma shareholders, but she is still active as a manager in the company. Her older son Li Guishan and a man named Li Miaoxing finally inherited the last 1% of her shares, in total owning 51% and 49% of the shares respectively, in order to lead on her legacy. However, after struggles and declining profits in 2017 and 2018, she returned back to an active role in managing the company in 2019 and brought it back to a growing course again.
