= Ugly Delicious =

- Genre: Cooking; Documentary; Travel
- Directed by: Eddie Schmidt; Jason Zeldes; Laura Gabbert; Morgan Neville
- Presented by: David Chang
- Starring: David Chang; Peter Meehan; Aziz Ansari; David Choe; Rene Redzepi
- Original language: English
- No. of seasons: 2
- No. of episodes: 12

Production
- Executive producers: Ben Cotner; Adam Del Deo
- Producers: Morgan Neville; David Chang; Eddie Schmidt; Peter Meehan; Christopher Chen; Lisa Nishimura
- Running time: 45-55 minutes
- Production company: Tremolo Productions

Original release
- Network: Netflix
- Release: February 23, 2018 – March 6, 2020

Ugly Delicious is a non-fiction original series on Netflix combining travel, cooking, and history. Each episode highlights one dish or concept, and explores how it is made in different regions and how it evolves.

The first season premiered on February 23, 2018, with host David Chang. On November 22, 2018, it was renewed for a second season, which premiered on March 6, 2020. The second season contained only half as many episodes as the first, likely due to Chang's increasingly busy schedule and the birth of his first child.

== Plot ==
Each episode examines the cultural, sociological, and culinary history of a specific popular food. Chang challenges and explores the attitudes in each dish's lore. Mike Hale wrote in his review for The New York Times that Ugly Delicious is "an extended television essay, in the form of free-associative, globe-trotting conversations about food and culture."

== Episodes ==
Season	Episodes	Originally released
1	8	February 23, 2018
2	4	March 6, 2020

=== Season 1 (2018) ===
No. overall	No. in season	Title	Original release date
1	1	"Pizza"	February 23, 2018
David Chang explores the concept of authentic pizza. Mark Iacono travels to New Haven, Connecticut and Naples, Italy. In Naples, they meet with an association that seeks to establish "rules" on how to authentically make Neapolitan pizza. David and Aziz Ansari travel to Japan to see how chefs there interpret the pizza. Back in Brooklyn, David orders pizza from Domino's, and critiques their pies with Peter and Mark. David then works a shift at Domino's helping to deliver pizzas.
2	2	"Tacos"	February 23, 2018
After trying tacos in Los Angeles with Jonathan Gold and Gustavo Arellano; David and Peter travel to Mexico. Chang also travels to Copenhagen and Philadelphia to sample popular Mexican restaurants there.
3	3	"Homecooking"	February 23, 2018
David and Peter prepare a Thanksgiving dinner for the Chang family while fellow chefs look back on their memories of food.
4	4	"Shrimp and Crawfish"	February 23, 2018
With the success of Viet-Cajun cuisine in Houston, David attempts to bring this cuisine to New Orleans, which does not have this fusion, despite having many Vietnamese restaurants as well as being one of the centers of Cajun food.
5	5	"BBQ"	February 23, 2018
David explores Korean barbecue with Steven Yeun and David Choe, and compares and contrasts it with the American barbecue found in places like Texas and North Carolina.
6	6	"Fried Chicken"	February 23, 2018
David explores Nashville hot chicken with Sean Brock while also learning about the complicated history of fried chicken among African-Americans.
7	7	"Fried Rice"	February 23, 2018
David examines one of the most pervasive foods on the planet: Chinese food. While doing so, he explores the misconceptions that Westerners have behind it, ranging from its usage of MSG, to the nature of "true Chinese food" and how it differs from Western takeout. He also discusses the origin of Chinese-American food in the United States, and how early Chinese immigrants from the 19th century were restricted where they were allowed to work, with often only laundry shops and restaurants being permissible.
8	8	"Stuffed"	February 23, 2018
The episode includes a friendly debate about which is better: Asian dumplings or Italian stuffed pasta? David explores the different types of xiaolongbao and meets up with Ali Wong.

=== Season 2 (2020) ===
No. overall	No. in season	Title	Original release date
9	1	"Kids Menu"	March 6, 2020
David learns that he is about to become a father. He explores the differences in school food between Japan and the United States, where he attempts to create a meal that satisfies dietary and budgetary guidelines, while still being enjoyed by students. David discusses the challenges in maintaining a work-life balance as a parent and a chef with his colleagues, and he attempts to make homemade baby food. Grace gives birth at the end of the episode.
10	2	"Don’t Call It Curry"	March 6, 2020
David attempts to understand the regional differences in Indian cuisine, the true definition of curry, and how it is typically served in America. He enjoys homemade meals with Indian-Americans Padma Lakshmi and Aziz Ansari. He travels to Mumbai and Kerala to see first hand the foods and dishes served there, as well as the raw spices that are harvested and collected there.
11	3	"Steak"	March 6, 2020
An examination of the culture surrounding steak. David compares steakhouses in Japan, Australia, and the United States. He discusses the masculinity associated with eating beef with a professor of gender studies. David Choe visits a bath house in Detroit that serves steak to its patrons. Chefs discuss how customers are stereotyped based on the way they order their steak. The future of eating steak and the availability of steak is discussed.
12	4	"As the Meat Turns"	March 6, 2020
A deep dive into the culture of meat cooked on a vertical spit and its various origins in the Levant, the Persian Gulf, and Iran, and across other parts of the Middle East. The show visits Beirut and Istanbul to understand how stereotypes of cuisine pose challenges to chefs' creativity and the effects of the Syrian civil war on Syrian food. Episode features Reem Assil, Anissa Helou, Diep Tran, and Nabih Bulos.

== Reception ==
Critical reviews have mostly been positive. Review aggregator Rotten Tomatoes reported an approval rating of 100% based on 21 reviews, with an average rating of 8.33/10 for the first season. The website's critical consensus states, "Ugly Delicious injects new life into the food documentary by dispensing with culinary pretensions and celebrating a vibrant spectrum of dishes that are sure to whet audience appetites." Metacritic gave the series a weighted average score of 77 out of 100 based on 5 reviews, indicating "generally favorable reviews".

Greg Morabito of Eater called the series' first season "maddeningly good" claiming that it, "raises the bar for food/travel shows." Jen Chaney of Vulture praised the show's first season for raising important cultural issues and taking "a highly egalitarian approach to cuisine."

For the second season, review aggregator Rotten Tomatoes reported an approval rating of 100% based on 5 reviews, with an average rating of 7/10.

== Accolades ==
Year	Award	Category	Nominee(s)	Result	Ref.
2020	Primetime Emmy Awards	Outstanding Hosted Nonfiction Series or Special	Morgan Neville, Dara Horenblas, David Chang, Christopher Chen, Caryn Capotosto, Blake Davis and Chris Ying	Nominated	

== See also ==
- Dark cuisine or hei an liao li
