= Salsa macha =

Mexican hot sauce

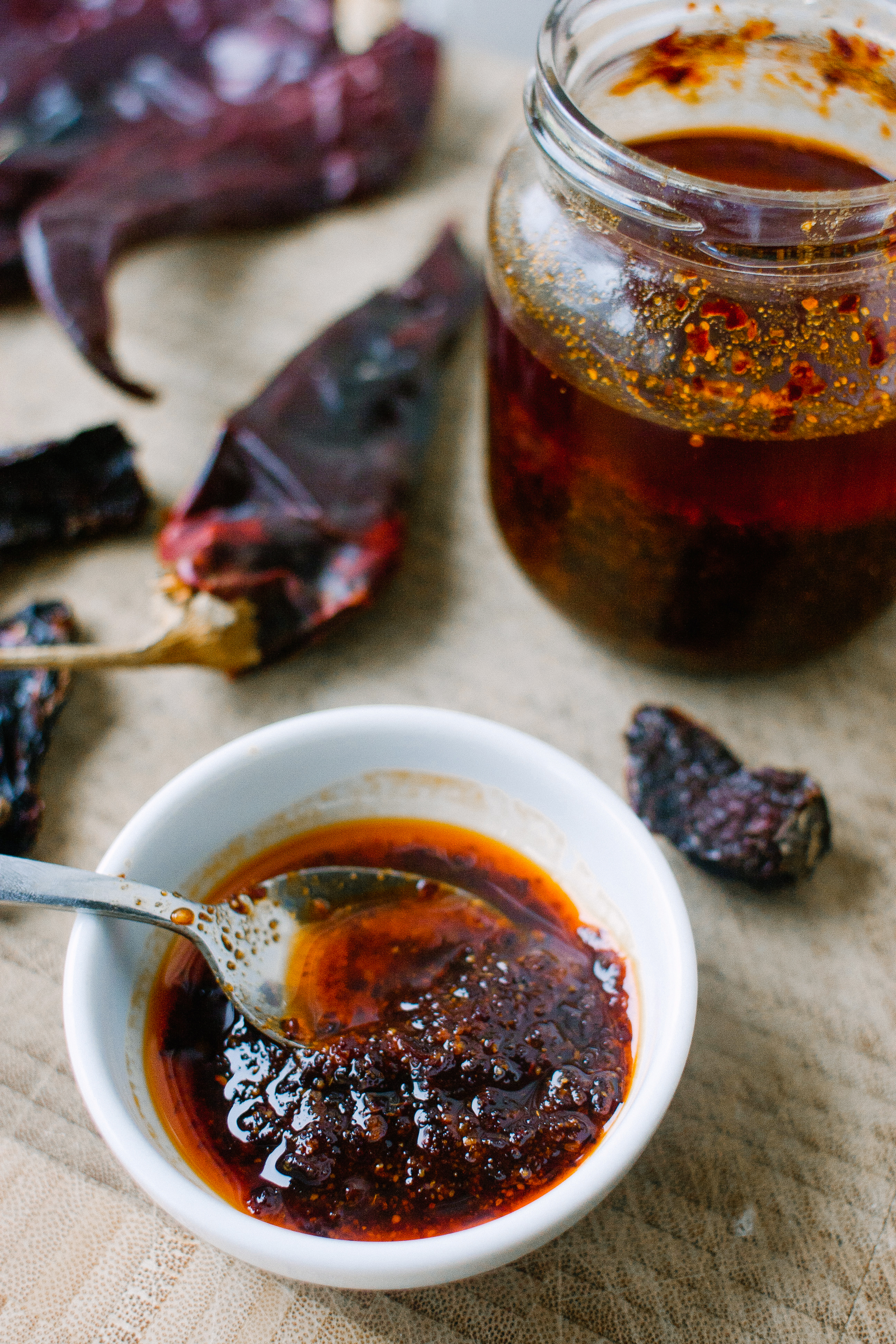
Salsa macha can be made from a variety of chiles

Salsa macha is a Mexican spicy condiment typically made of vegetable oil, dried chilies, garlic and salt. The chilies may be chile de árbol, serrano, chipotle, pequin or morita.

== Etymology ==
The sauce likely originated from Veracruz. The name macha may come from the feminine form of macho, i. e., "strong, brave" because the resulting salsa was stronger than other salsas or from the adjective machacada ("mashed") because of its original preparation being crushed in a mortar.

== Uses ==
It can be used to accompany pozole, tacos, carne asada, fish, quesadillas, chamorro, botanas, etc.
