= Sandra Tsing Loh =

American actress, comedian and author (born 1962)

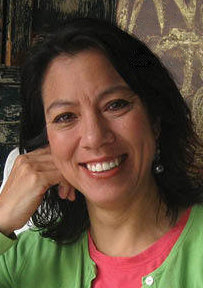
- Born: February 11, 1962 (age 64); Los Angeles, California, U.S.
- Education: California Institute of Technology; University of Southern California
- Occupations: Actress, author, radio personality, professor
- Website: sandratsingloh.com

Sandra Tsing Loh (Chinese: 陸賽靜; pinyin: Lù Sàijìng, born February 11, 1962) is an American actress, author, comedian, radio personality, and former professor of art at the University of California, Irvine.

== Life and career ==
Loh is the younger daughter of a Chinese father and a German mother. She was raised in Malibu, Southern California, and after attending Malibu Park Junior High School was bused South to Santa Monica High School, where she was active in the computer-and-engineering-related "Olive Starlight Orchestra" and founded the performance-arts group and civic volunteer organization "Young Bureaucrats, Of Course (YBOC)". She also played violin in the Samohi school orchestra.

Loh graduated from Caltech with a BS in Physics. She returned in 2005 to deliver its commencement speech. She is also a graduate of the Master of Professional Writing Program at the University of Southern California. Her early career as a performance artist included a piano concert on a freeway overpass in Downtown Los Angeles, and one in which she distributed hundreds of one-dollar-bills. She went on to perform a number of well-received autobiographical one-woman shows, in which she developed a particular form of observational humor.

A writer for the publication Asian American Playwrights called Loh "a multifaceted artist'". Her piano recordings of her original compositions that were made during the late 1980s were labeled "a cross between Art Tatum and Francis Poulenc". A writer for The New York Times called Loh "perpetual darling of the ever-beleaguered Los Angeles intelligentsia and constant candidate for that publishers' holy grail, the female David Sedaris". Loh gained some national notoriety when KCRW canceled her weekly radio commentary, The Loh Life, after an engineer neglected to bleep her on-air utterance of the word "fuck" during a segment on knitting that aired on 22 February 2004. The Loh Life was soon after picked up by the other Los Angeles NPR affiliate, KPCC. She is also the host of The Loh Down on Science, a daily science oriented radio show, and was a regular commentator on NPR's Morning Edition, PRI's This American Life, American Public Media's Marketplace, and other public radio programs. She has some versatility as a radio personality in that many of her programs, some of which air at the same time, are aimed at a different radio audience. As an example, Loh would use humor to publicize a recent but serious scientific discovery on The Loh Down on Science series while she would make a humorous comment on a current business topic on her segment on Marketplace.

Loh is the author of several books, including the semi-autobiographical A Year in Van Nuys. She has also written reviews of books about parenting, feminism, and several other topics for The Atlantic, where she is a regular contributor. Loh appeared in yet another one-woman show, "Mother on Fire," at the 24th Street Theatre in Los Angeles between October 2005 and March 2006. She made a brief cameo appearance in the 2006 film Unaccompanied Minors. She is featured in the book Part Asian, 100% Hapa by artist Kip Fulbeck.

In reviewing Loh's 2008 book Mother on Fire for the New York Times Sunday Book Review, Pamela Paul wrote that she "was in awe of [Loh's] quippy brilliance" and that Loh's writing ability "is no less than a feat of genius".

Loh wrote about her divorce in a 2009 article for The Atlantic, where she has been a contributing writer for several years, focusing mostly on parenting and family issues. She explained at the time that, as a parent and full-time writer, "I did not have the strength to 'work on' falling in love again in our marriage." She also admitted to cheating on her husband.

Loh's essay, "The Bitch Is Back," which first appeared in The Atlantic, was selected a Best American Essay for the 2012 edition of the Best American Essays series.

In 2014, Loh published The Madwoman in the Volvo: My Year of Raging Hormones, and was profiled in The New York Times. Loh adapted The Madwoman in the Volvo into a play for South Coast Repertory Theater.

She was the invited commencement speaker at Caltech in 2005, at UC Irvine in 2014, and the University of Michigan–Flint in 2015.

In 2013, Loh received an appointment as an Associate Adjunct Professor in the Claire Trevor School of the Arts at the University of California, Irvine, in which she teaches courses in drama and also science communication. She has since left UC Irvine at an unknown time prior to 2017.

== Selected works ==
=== Books ===
- Loh, Sandra Tsing (2020). The Madwoman and the Roomba. Norton. ISBN 978-0-393-24920-0
- Loh, Sandra Tsing (2014). The Madwoman in the Volvo. Norton. ISBN 978-0-393-08868-7.
- Loh, Sandra Tsing (2008). Mother on Fire. Crown. ISBN 978-0-609-60813-5.
- Loh, Sandra Tsing (2001). A Year in Van Nuys. Crown. ISBN 0-609-60812-6.
- Loh, Sandra Tsing (1997). If You Lived Here, You'd Be Home By Now. Riverhead Hardcover. ISBN 1-57322-068-X.
- Loh, Sandra Tsing (1997). Aliens in America. Riverhead Books. ISBN 1-57322-627-0.
- Loh, Sandra Tsing (1996). Depth Takes a Holiday: Essays From Lesser Los Angeles. Riverhead Hardcover. ISBN 1-57322-031-0.

=== Plays ===
- The Madwoman in the Volvo (2016)
- The Madwomen of the West (2023)

=== Interviews ===
- Sandra Tsing Loh Q&A at The Nation magazine (2014)

=== Book reviews ===
Year	Review article	Work(s) reviewed
2009	"On being a bad mother: true confessions". The Atlantic. Vol. 304, no. 5. December 2009. pp. 86–101.	Waldman, Ayelet (2009). Bad Mother. New York, NY: Doubleday Books. ISBN 978-0-385-52793-4.; Greer, Germaine (October 6, 2009). The Female Eunuch (8th English ed.). New York, NY: Harper Collins. ISBN 978-0-06-197280-5.
2014	"'The Hybrid Tiger' and 'The Triple Package'". The New York Times. New York, NY. January 31, 2014.	Chua, Amy; Rubenfeld, Jed (February 4, 2014). The Triple Package. New York, NY: Penguin Press. ISBN 978-1-59420-546-0.; Huang, Quanyu (2014). The Hybrid Tiger. Amherst, NY: Prometheus. ISBN 978-1-61614-851-5.

== Discography ==
- Pianovision (1991) K^{2}B_{2} Records

== Filmography ==
- The Weekenders (2000–2003)
- Weight Loss (The Office) (2008)
- Paws of Fury: The Legend of Hank (2022)

== Other audio/visual work ==
Radio programs

- "The Loh Down". Archived from the original on September 27, 2011., Audio archives of her business oriented radio commentaries on the public radio program, Marketplace (2004–2005)
- This American Life Audio archive of her contributions to the public radio program This American Life (1995–1998)
- "The Loh Life". Archived from the original on May 10, 2021., Audio archive of her weekly radio commentaries on public radio
- The Loh Down On Science Audio archive of her daily science show on public radio

Public speeches

- "2005 Caltech commencement speech". Archived from the original on June 4, 2010.; An audio, and video versions are also available via iTunes

Interviews

- Audio interview with Sandra Tsing Loh on public radio program The Sound of Young America
- Audio interview with Sandra Tsing Loh on KCSN Arts & Roots Forum by Martin Perlich
