= List of After Words interviews first aired in 2007 =

After Words is an American television series on the C-SPAN2 network’s weekend programming schedule known as Book TV. The program is an hour-long talk show, each week featuring an interview with the author of a new nonfiction book. The program has no regular host. Instead, each author is paired with a guest host who is familiar with the author or the subject matter of their book.

First air date (Links to video)	Interviewee(s)	Interviewer(s)	Book	Topic of interview / Comments
January 6, 2007	Anthony Weller	Norman Hatch	First into Nagasaki: The Censored Eyewitness Dispatches on Post-Atomic Japan and Its Prisoners of War	Atomic bombings of Hiroshima and Nagasaki
January 13, 2007	Gabor Boritt	James Swanson	The Gettysburg Gospel: The Lincoln Speech That Nobody Knows	The Gettysburg Address
January 20, 2007	Joel L. Fleishman	Elizabeth Boris	The Foundation: A Great American Secret; How Private Wealth is Changing the World	
January 27, 2007	Frank Luntz	John McCaslin	Words That Work: It's Not What You Say, It's What People Hear	
February 3, 2007	Eric Klinenberg	Ben Scott	Fighting for Air: The Battle to Control America's Media	
February 10, 2007	Brian Doherty	Doug Bandow	Radicals for Capitalism: The Freewheeling History of the Modern American Libertarian Movement	Libertarianism in the United States
February 17, 2007	John Naisbitt	George Gilder	Mind Set!: Reset Your Thinking and See the Future	
February 24, 2007	Edward Brooke	Eleanor Holmes Norton	Bridging the Divide: My Life	
March 3, 2007	John Patrick Diggins	George Will	Ronald Reagan: Fate, Freedom, and the Making of History	Ronald Reagan
March 10, 2007	Martha Raddatz	Thomas Hammes	The Long Road Home: A Story of War and Family	Siege of Sadr City
March 17, 2007	John Newhouse	Walter Boyne	Boeing Versus Airbus: The Inside Story of the Greatest International Competition in Business	Competition between Airbus and Boeing
March 24, 2007	Fred Charles Ikle	John Lehman	Annihilation from Within: The Ultimate Threat to Nations	
April 7, 2007	Bill Bradley	James Leach	The New American Story	
April 14, 2007	Ali Allawi	Roland Flamini	The Occupation of Iraq: Winning the War, Losing the Peace	History of Iraq (2003–2011)
April 21, 2007	David Pietrusza	Ann Compton	1920: The Year of the Six Presidents	1920 United States presidential election
April 28, 2007	Michael Wallis	Roy Blunt	Billy the Kid: The Endless Ride	Billy the Kid
May 5, 2007	Jabari Asim	Bakari Kitwana	The N Word: Who Can Say It, Who Shouldn't, and Why	The word "nigger"
May 12, 2007	Robert McGovern	Jack Kemp	All American: Why I Believe in Football, God, and the War in Iraq	
May 19, 2007	Rod Paige	Kathy Kiely	The War Against Hope: How Teachers' Unions Hurt Children, Hinder Teachers, and Endanger Public Education	
May 26, 2007	Charles Rangel	Jim Mills	And I Haven't Had a Bad Day Since: From the Streets of Harlem to the Halls of Congress	
June 2, 2007	Michael Beschloss	Alexis Simendinger	Presidential Courage: Brave Leaders and How They Changed America, 1789-1989	
June 9, 2007	Kenneth Ackerman	Joan Biskupic	Young J. Edgar: Hoover, the Red Scare, and the Assault on Civil Liberties	J. Edgar Hoover; 1919 United States anarchist bombings; The First Red Scare
June 16, 2007	Ted Gup	Michael Isikoff	Nation of Secrets: The Threat to Democracy and the American Way of Life	
June 24, 2007	Amity Shlaes	Nick Gillespie	The Forgotten Man: A New History of the Great Depression	The Great Depression
June 30, 2007	Seth Lerer	Michael Dirda	Inventing English: A Portable History of the Language	History of the English language
July 7, 2007	Beverly Daniel Tatum	Roger Wilkins	Can We Talk About Race? And Other Conversations in an Era of School Resegregation	
July 15, 2007	Tim Weiner	David Ignatius	Legacy of Ashes: The History of the CIA	History of the Central Intelligence Agency
July 21, 2007	Larry Berman	Robert Kaiser	Perfect Spy: The Incredible Double Life of Pham Xuan An, 'Time' Magazine Reporter and Vietnamese Communist Agent	Pham Xuan An
July 28, 2007	Sally Jenkins	Suzan Harjo	The Real All Americans: The Team That Changed a Game, a People, a Nation	Glenn Scobey Warner, Carlisle Indian Industrial School, Carlisle Indians football, Jim Thorpe
August 4, 2007	Connie Schultz	Jim Tankersley	...and His Lovely Wife: A Memoir from the Woman Beside the Man	
August 11, 2007	Alastair Campbell	Gerald Seib	The Blair Years: The Alastair Campbell Diaries	Premiership of Tony Blair
August 18, 2007	Stanley Weintraub	Max Boot	15 Stars: Eisenhower, MacArthur, Marshall - Three Generals Who Saved the American Century	Dwight D. Eisenhower; Douglas MacArthur; George Marshall
August 25, 2007	Scott Gant	Peter Prichard	We're All Journalists Now: The Transformation of the Press and Reshaping of the Law in the Internet Age	
September 1, 2007	Michael Duffy	Bob Deans	The Preacher and the Presidents: Billy Graham in the White House	Billy Graham
September 8, 2007	John Nagl	Sean Naylor	The U.S. Army/Marine Corps Counterinsurgency Field Manual	
September 15, 2007	Raymond Ibrahim	Lawrence Wright	The Al Qaeda Reader	al Qaeda
September 22, 2007	Nassim Taleb	David Brooks	The Black Swan: The Impact of the Highly Improbable	Black swan theory
September 30, 2007	Norman Podhoretz	Charles Peña	World War IV: The Long Struggle Against Islamofascism	
October 6, 2007	Naomi Klein	Franklin Foer	The Shock Doctrine: The Rise of Disaster Capitalism	
October 13, 2007	Lynne Cheney	Nancy Gibbs	Blue Skies, No Fences: A Memoir of Childhood and Family	
October 20, 2007	Naomi Wolf	Viet Dinh	The End of America: Letter of Warning to a Young Patriot	
October 27, 2007	Barbara Slavin	Trita Parsi	Bitter Friends, Bosom Enemies: Iran, the U.S., and the Twisted Path to Confrontation	Iran–United States relations
November 3, 2007	Jonathan Chait	Grover Norquist	The Big Con: The True Story of How Washington Got Hoodwinked and Hijacked by Crackpot Economics	
November 10, 2007	Michael Gerson	Richard Viguerie	Heroic Conservatism: Why Republicans Need to Embrace America's Ideals (And Why They Deserve to Fail If They Don't)	
November 17, 2007	Garry Kasparov	Leon Aron	How Life Imitates Chess: Making the Right Moves, from the Board to the Boardroom	Chess
November 25, 2007	Rick Atkinson	Patrick O'Donnell	The Day of Battle: The War in Sicily and Italy, 1943 to 1944	Italian Campaign (World War II)
December 1, 2007	David Frost	Timothy Naftali	Frost/Nixon: Behind the Scenes of the Nixon Interviews	The Nixon Interviews
December 8, 2007	Ronald Spector	Steven Clemons	In the Ruins of Empire: The Japanese Surrender and the Battle for Postwar Asia	Occupation of Japan
December 15, 2007	Patrick Buchanan	Diana West	Day of Reckoning: How Hubris, Ideology, and Greed Are Tearing America Apart	
December 22, 2007	Howard Kurtz	James Warren	Reality Show: Inside the Last Great Television News War	ABC News, NBC News, CBS News
December 29, 2007	Amy Chua	Cullen Murphy	Day of Empire: How Hyperpowers Rise to Global Dominance and Why They Fall	
