= An Dương (disambiguation) =

An Dương may refer to several places in Vietnam, including:

- An Dương, Haiphong, a ward of Haiphong
- An Dương District, a former urban district of Haiphong
- An Dương, Lê Chân, a former ward of Lê Chân District in Haiphong
- An Dương, Bắc Giang, a former commune of Tân Yên District, Bắc Giang province

== See also ==
- An Dương Vương, a Vietnamese historical figure
