= Viet people =

Southeast Asian ethnic group

Viet people / Kinh people
người Việt / người Kinh
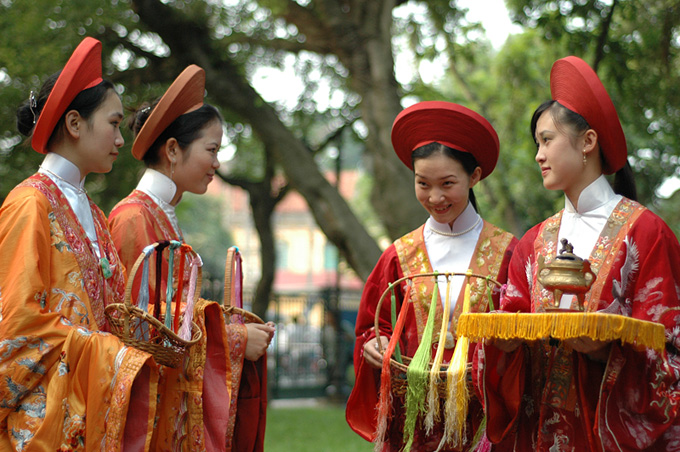
- Vietnamese women wearing áo nhật bình along with khăn vành dây.

Total population
- c. 90 million (2025)

Regions with significant populations
- Vietnam: 82,085,826 (2019)
- Overseas communities: Majority of the Vietnamese diaspora

Languages
- Vietnamese, Vietnamese sign languages

Religion
- Mainly folk religion syncretized with Buddhism; irreligious; significant Christian minority; others

Related ethnic groups
- Other Vietic ethnic groups (Gin, Muong, Chứt, Thổ peoples)

The Viet people (Vietnamese: người Việt), also known in Vietnam as the Kinh people (Vietnamese: người Kinh, to distinguish from other ethnicities) are a Southeast Asian ethnicity native to modern-day northern Vietnam, who expanded southwards in the last millennium. They speak Vietnamese, the most widely used Austroasiatic language, and are one of the four main Vietic-speaking groups in Vietnam, the others being the Mường, Thổ, and Chứt.

The Viet accounted for 85.32% of Vietnam's population in the 2019 census and are officially designated as the Kinh people to distinguish them from minority groups in the country, such as the Mường, Tày, Hmong, and Cham. Diasporic descendants of the Kinh in Guangxi, China, known as the Gin people, are one of the 56 ethnic groups officially recognized by China. The Viet also constitute the majority of the Vietnamese diaspora worldwide.

== Terminology ==
According to Churchman (2010), all endonyms and exonyms referring to the Vietnamese such as Việt (related to ancient Chinese geographical imagination), Kinh (related to medieval administrative designation), or Keeu and Kæw (derived from Jiāo 交, ancient Chinese toponym for Northern Vietnam, Old Chinese *kraw) by Kra–Dai speaking peoples, are related to political structures or have common origins in ancient Chinese geographical imagination. Most of the time, the Austroasiatic-speaking ancestors of the modern Kinh under one single ruler might have assumed for themselves a similar or identical social self-designation inherent in the modern Vietnamese first-person pronoun ta (us, we, I) to differentiate themselves with other groups. In the older colloquial usage, ta corresponded to "ours" as opposed to "theirs", and during colonial time they were "nước ta" (our country) and "tiếng ta" (our language) in contrast to "nước tây" (western countries) and "tiếng tây" (western languages).

=== Việt ===
The term "Việt" (Chinese: 越; pinyin: Yuè; Cantonese Yale: Yuht; Vietnamese: Việt), when written in Early Middle Chinese used the logograph "戉" for an axe (a homophone), in oracle bone and bronze inscriptions of the late Shang dynasty (c. 1200 BC), and later as "越". At that time it referred to a people or chieftain to the northwest of the Shang. In the early 8th century BC, a tribe on the middle Yangtze were called the Yangyue, which was later used to describe peoples living further south. Between the 7th and 4th centuries BC, Việt (Hanyu Pinyin: Yuè) referred to the State of Yue in the lower Yangtze basin and its people. From the 3rd century BC, the term was used for the non-Chinese populations of south and southwest China and northern Vietnam, with particular ethnic groups called Minyue, Âu Việt (Ouyue), Lạc Việt (Luoyue), etc., collectively called the Baiyue (Bách Việt, Chinese: 百越; pinyin: Bǎiyuè; Cantonese Yale: Baak Yuet; Vietnamese: Bách Việt; lit. 'Hundred Yue/Viet'; ). The term Bách Việt (Hanyu Pinyin: Bǎiyuè) first appeared in the book Lüshi Chunqiu compiled around 239 BC. By the 17th and 18th centuries AD, educated Vietnamese referred to themselves as người Việt ( 𠊛越; Viet people) or người Nam ( 𠊛南; southern people).

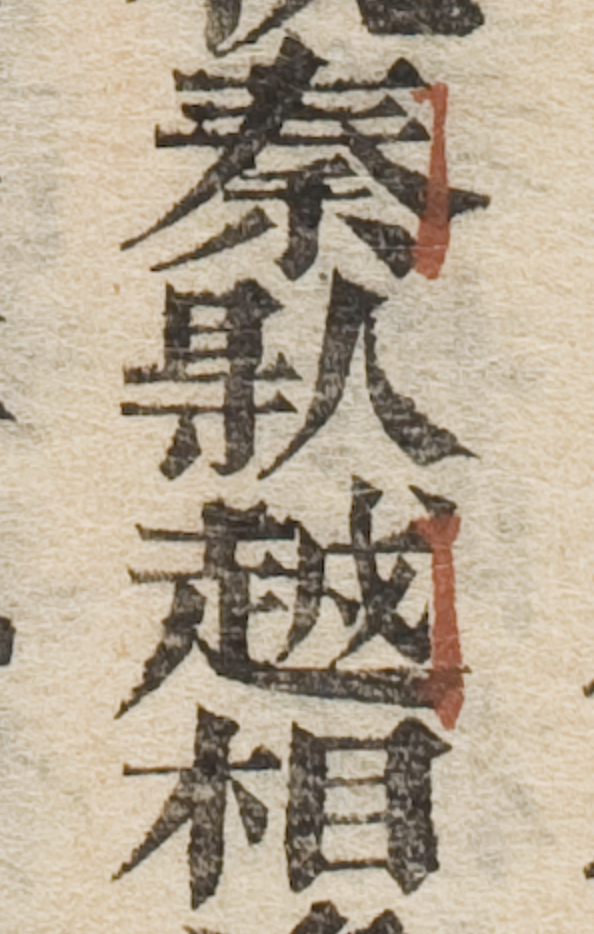
Người Việt 𠊛越 (Vietnamese people) written here in the book, 大南國史演歌 Đại Nam quốc sử diễn ca

=== Kinh ===
Beginning in the 10th and 11th centuries, a strand of Viet–Muong (northern Vietic language) - with influence from a hypothetical Chinese dialect in northern Vietnam, dubbed as Annamese Middle Chinese - evolved into what is now the Vietnamese language. Its speakers called themselves the người Kinh ( chữ Nôm: 𠊛京; lit. 'Kinh people'), meaning people of the "metropolitan" centered around the Red River Delta with Hanoi as its capital. Historic and modern chữ Nôm scripture classically uses the Han character '京' (Hanyu Pinyin: Jīng; Vietnamese: Kinh). Other variants of Proto-Viet–Muong were driven from the lowlands by the Kinh and were called Trại (寨), or "outpost" people", by the 13th century. These became the modern Mường people. According to Victor Lieberman, Kinh people may be a colonial-era term for Vietnamese speakers inserted anachronistically into translations of pre-colonial documents, but literature on 18th century ethnic formation is lacking.

== History ==
=== Origins and prehistoric period ===
According to the Vietnamese legend The Tale of the Hồng Bàng Clan (Hồng Bàng thị truyện), written in the 15th century, the first Vietnamese were descended from the dragon lord Lạc Long Quân and the fairy Âu Cơ. They married and had one hundred eggs, from which hatched one hundred children. Their eldest son ruled as the Hùng king. The Hùng kings were claimed to be descended from the mythical figure Shennong/Thần Nông.

The earliest reference of the proto-Vietnamese in Chinese annals was the Lạc, Lạc Việt, or the Dongsonian, an ancient tribal confederacy of perhaps polyglot Austroasiatic and Kra–Dai speakers who occupied the Red River Delta in northern Vietnam.

One hypothesis suggests that the forerunners of the ethnic Kinh descend from a subset of proto-Austroasiatic people in southern China, either around Yunnan, Lingnan, or the Yangtze River, as well as mainland Southeast Asia. These proto-Austroasiatics also diverged into Monic speakers, who settled further to the west, and the Khmeric speakers, who migrated further south. The Munda of northeastern India were another subset of proto-Austroasiatics who likely diverged earlier than the aforementioned groups, given the linguistic distance in basic vocabulary of the languages. Most archaeologists, linguists, and other specialists, such as Sinologists and crop experts, believe that they arrived no later than 2000 BC, bringing with them the practice of riverine agriculture and in particular, the cultivation of wet rice.

Some linguists, such as James Chamberlain and Joachim Schliesinger, have suggested that Vietic-speaking people migrated northwards from the North Central Region of Vietnam to the Red River Delta, which had originally been inhabited by Tai speakers. However, Michael Churchman found no records of population shifts in Jiaozhi (centered around the Red River Delta) in Chinese sources, indicating that a fairly stable population of Austroasiatic speakers, ancestral to modern Vietnamese, inhabited the delta during the Han-Tang periods.

Another theory, based upon linguistic diversity, locates the most probable homeland of the Vietic languages in modern-day Bolikhamsai Province and Khammouane Province in Laos as well as in parts of Nghệ An Province and Quảng Bình Province in Vietnam. In the 1930s, clusters of Vietic-speaking communities discovered in the hills of eastern Laos were believed to be the earliest inhabitants of that region.

But so far, many scholars link the origin of the Vietic languages to northern Vietnam, around the Red River Delta.

Michael Churchman, Tuong Vu, and Frederic Pain argue that a distinct Vietnamese identity or language did not exist in full prior to and during the Han-Tang period. Churchman states that during this period, the tribes in northern Vietnam and southern China did not have any kind of defined ethnic boundary and could not be described as "Vietnamese" (Kinh) in any satisfactory sense. Vu believes that a Han-Viet group existed that spoke both a Chinese dialect called "Annamese Middle Chinese" and Proto-Viet–Muong, but the inhabitants of the Red River Valley did not have a single identity or language. Pain also argues that Vietnamese cultural identity was the result of Chinese influence on native elements that fully emerged in the post-Chinese rule period during the Song dynasty. Thus, attempts to identify ethnic groups in ancient Vietnam are problematic and often inaccurate.

=== Ancient to early medieval period ===
The Đông Sơn culture was pioneered by the Lạc Việt peoples, who also founded the Văn Lang chiefdom, ruled by the semi-mythical Hùng kings. To the south of the Dongsonians/Lạc Việt was the Sa Huỳnh culture of the Austronesian Chamic people. Around 400–200 BC, the Lạc Việt interacted with the Âu Việt, a splinter group of Tai people from southern China, and Sinitic peoples from further north. According to a late-third- or early-fourth-century AD Chinese chronicle, Thục Phán, the leader of the Âu Việt, conquered Văn Lang and deposed the last Hùng king. Having submissions of Lạc lords, Thục Phán proclaimed himself King An Dương of Âu Lạc kingdom, uniting the Lạc Việt and Âu Việt tribes.

In 179 BC, Zhao Tuo, a Chinese general who established the Nanyue state in modern-day southern China, annexed Âu Lạc, which initiated Sino-Vietic interaction that lasted for a millennium. In 111 BC, the Han Empire conquered Nanyue, which also brought northern Vietnam under Han rule.

By the 7th century to 9th century AD, as the Tang Empire ruled over the region, historians such as Henri Maspero proposed that Vietnamese-speaking people became separated from other Vietic groups such as the Mường and Chứt due to heavier Chinese influences on the Vietnamese. In the mid-9th century, local rebels aided by Nanzhao almost ended Tang rule. The Tang reconquered the region in 866, causing half of the local rebels to flee into the mountains, marking the separation between the Mường and the Vietnamese.

According to Jennifer Holmgren, the first six centuries of Chinese rule saw more Vietnamization of local Chinese than Sinicization of local Vietnamese. Compared to the first six centuries of Chinese rule when demographics were relatively stable, Chinese migration during the Tang period caused basic changes to certain portions of Vietnamese society in northern Vietnam. Most of these Chinese migrants came as soldiers or merchants, and settled down. Despite the increase of Chinese migrants to Vietnam, it was still much more constrained compared to Chinese migration to Guangdong and Guangxi due to the structure of Vietnamese society, which limited the ability of Chinese rulers to register and tax the local population. Vietnamese society retained their language and heritage. Other peoples like the Muong, Tay, and Nung people fled Chinese control into the uplands, where Chinese registers could not reach them. Non-Chinese foreign migration was also significant in the south due to pressures elsewhere such as the expanding Cham kingdom.

In 938, the Vietnamese leader Ngô Quyền who was a native of Thanh Hóa, led Vietnamese forces to defeat the Chinese armada at Bạch Đằng River. He proclaimed himself king over a polity that could be perceived as "Vietnamese".

=== Medieval and early modern period ===
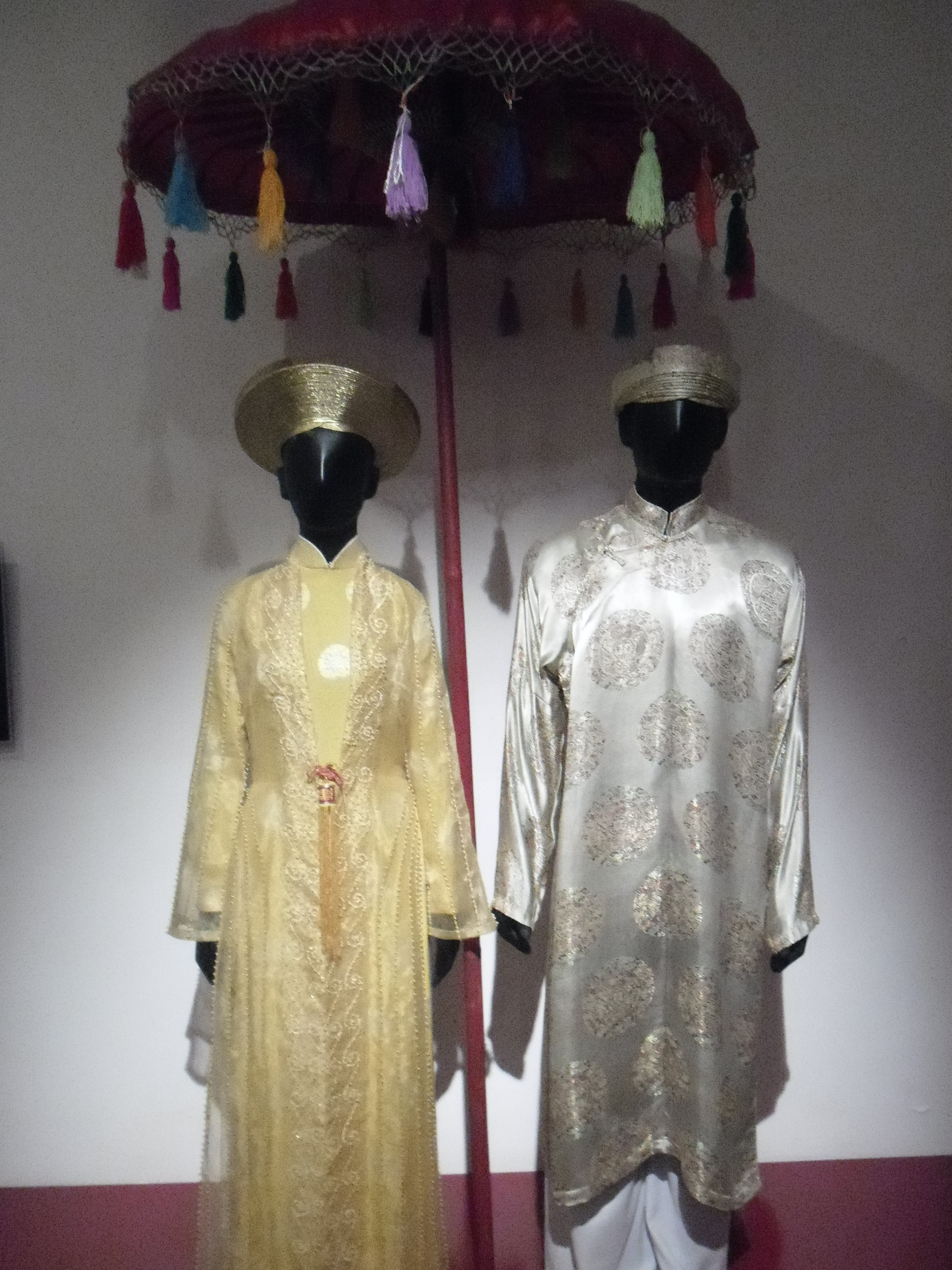
One of the traditional costumes of Vietnamese people

Ngô Quyền died in 944 and his kingdom collapsed into chaos and disturbances between twelve warlords and chiefs. In 968, a leader named Đinh Bộ Lĩnh united them and established the Đại Việt (Great Việt) kingdom. With assistance of powerful Buddhist monks, Đinh Bộ Lĩnh chose Hoa Lư in the southern edge of the Red River Delta as the capital instead of Tang-era Đại La, adopted Chinese-style imperial titles, coinage, and ceremonies and tried to preserve the Chinese administrative framework. The independence of Đại Việt, according to Andrew Chittick, allows it "to develop its own distinctive political culture and ethnic consciousness". In 979, Emperor Đinh Tiên Hoàng was assassinated, and Queen Dương Vân Nga married Dinh's general Lê Hoàn and appointed him as Emperor. Disturbances in Đại Việt attracted attention from the neighbouring Chinese Song dynasty and Champa Kingdom, but they were defeated by Lê Hoàn. A Khmer inscription dated 987 records the arrival of Vietnamese merchants (Yuon) in Angkor. Chinese writers Song Hao, Fan Chengda and Zhou Qufei all reported that the inhabitants of Đại Việt "tattooed their foreheads, crossed feet, black teeth, bare feet and blacken clothing". The early 11th-century Cham inscription of Chiên Đàn, My Son, erected by king of Champa Harivarman IV (r. 1074–1080), mentions that he had offered Khmer (Kmīra/Kmir) and Viet (Yvan) prisoners as slaves to various local gods and temples of the citadel of Tralauṅ Svon. Many Kinh Vietnamese also lived in Champa and were well-assimilated, like other Austroasiatic groups living in the state.

Successive Vietnamese royal families from the Đinh, Early Lê, Lý, Trần and Hồ dynasties, who had Hoa/Chinese ancestry, ruled the kingdom peacefully from 968 to 1407. Emperor Lý Thái Tổ (r. 1009–1028) relocated the Vietnamese capital from Hoa Lư to Đại La, the center of the Red River Delta in 1010. They practiced elitist marriage alliances between clans and nobles in the country. Mahayana Buddhism became state religion, with Cham, Indian and Chinese cultures influencing Vietnamese music instruments, dance and religious worship. Confucianism also slowly gained attention and influence. The earliest surviving corpus and text in the Vietnamese language were dated to the early 12th century whilst surviving chữ Nôm script inscriptions were dated to the early 13th century, showcasing enormous influences of Chinese culture among the early Vietnamese elites.

The Mongol Yuan dynasty unsuccessfully invaded Đại Việt in the 1250s and 1280s, though they sacked Hanoi. The Ming dynasty of China conquered Đại Việt in 1406, brought the Vietnamese under Chinese rule for 20 years, before they were driven out by Vietnamese leader Lê Lợi. The fourth grandson of Lê Lợi, Emperor Lê Thánh Tông (r. 1460–1497), is considered one of the greatest monarchs in Vietnamese history. His reign is recognized for the extensive administrative, military, education, and fiscal reforms he instituted, and a cultural revolution that replaced the old traditional aristocracy with a generation of literati scholars. He also adopted Confucianism and transformed Đại Việt from a Southeast Asian style polity to a bureaucratic state that flourished. Thánh Tông's forces, armed with gunpowder weapons, overwhelmed the long-term rival Champa in 1471 and launched an unsuccessful invasion against the Laotian and Lan Na kingdoms in the 1480s.

=== 16th century – Modern period ===
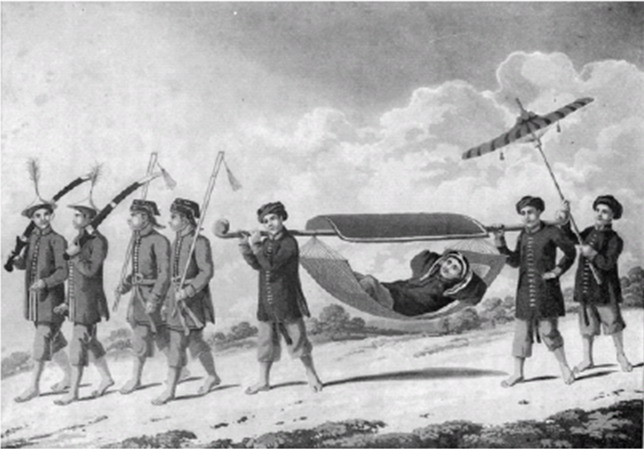
Vietnamese soldiers in 1828

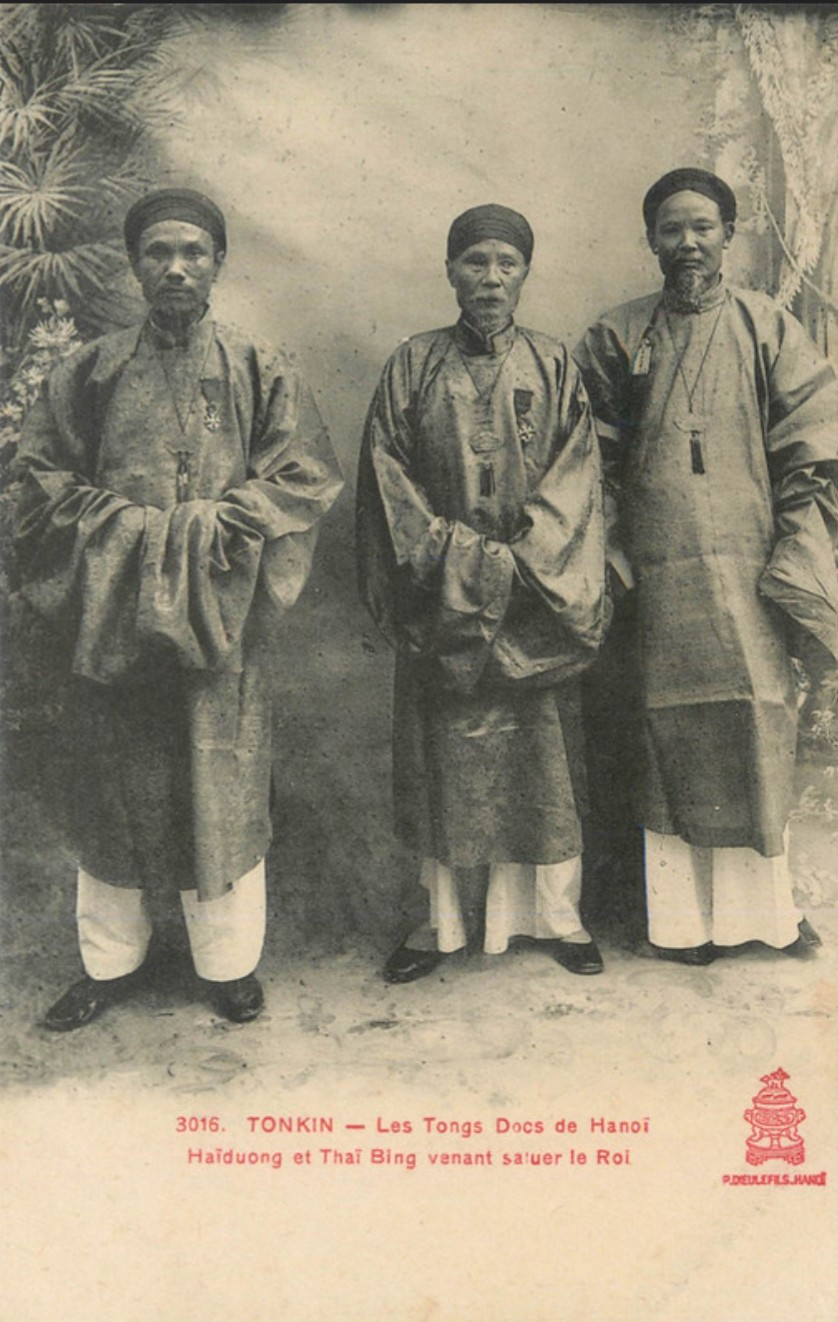
Vietnamese bureaucrat officials, 1883–1886

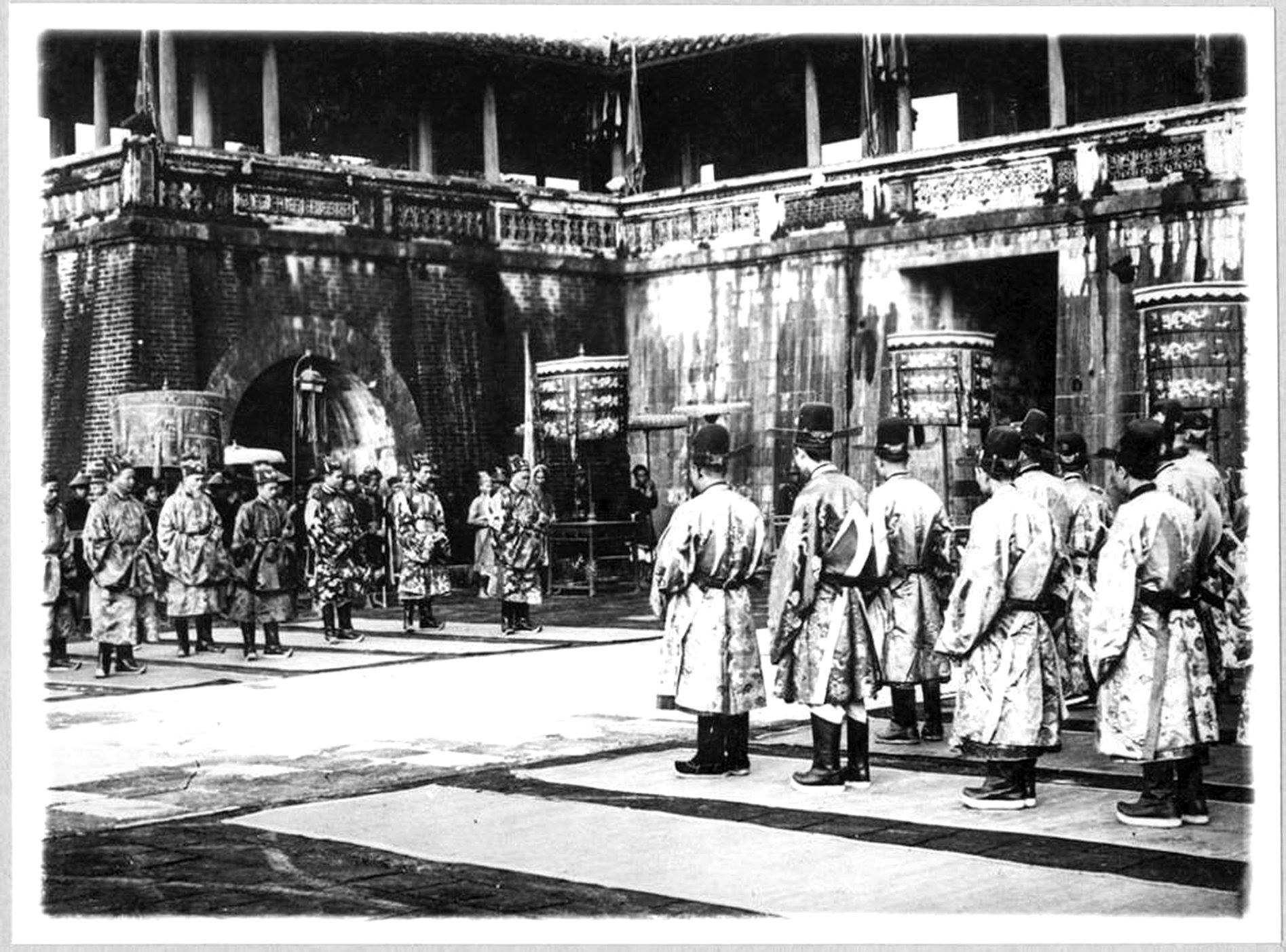
Vietnamese mandarins in front of the imperial palace in 1939.

With the death of Thánh Tông in 1497, the Đại Việt kingdom swiftly declined. Extreme climate, failing crops, regionalism and factionism tore the Vietnamese apart. From 1533 to 1790s, four powerful Vietnamese families – Mạc, Lê, Trịnh and Nguyễn – each ruled their own domains. In the northern Vietnamese polity of Đàng Ngoài (outer realm), the Lê emperors barely sat on the throne while the Trịnh lords held power of the court. The Mạc controlled northeast Vietnam. The Nguyễn lords ruled the southern polity of Đàng Trong (inner realm). Thousands of ethnic Vietnamese migrated south and settled on the old Cham lands, with Cham inhabitants assimilating into the new Vietnamese state. Vietnamese also settled in the highlands of Vietnam and intermixed with the natives over centuries. European missionaries and traders from the sixteenth century brought new religion, ideas and crops to the Vietnamese (Annamese). By 1639, there were 82,500 Catholic converts throughout Vietnam. In 1651, Alexandre de Rhodes published a 300-pages catechism in Latin and romanized-Vietnamese (chữ Quốc Ngữ) or the Vietnamese alphabet.

Conflict among Vietnamese ended in 1802 as Emperor Gia Long, who was aided by French mercenaries, defeated the Tay Son kingdoms and reunited Vietnam. By 1847, the Vietnamese state under Emperor Thiệu Trị, a people that were identified as "người Việt Nam" accounted for nearly 80 percent of the country's population. This demographic model continues to persist through the French Indochina, Japanese occupation and modern day.

Between 1862 and 1867, the southern third of the country became the French colony of Cochinchina. By 1884, the entire country had come under French rule, with the central and northern parts of Vietnam separated into the two protectorates of Annam and Tonkin. The three Vietnamese entities were formally integrated into the union of French Indochina in 1887. The French administration imposed significant political and cultural changes on Vietnamese society. A Western-style system of modern education introduced new humanist values into Vietnam.

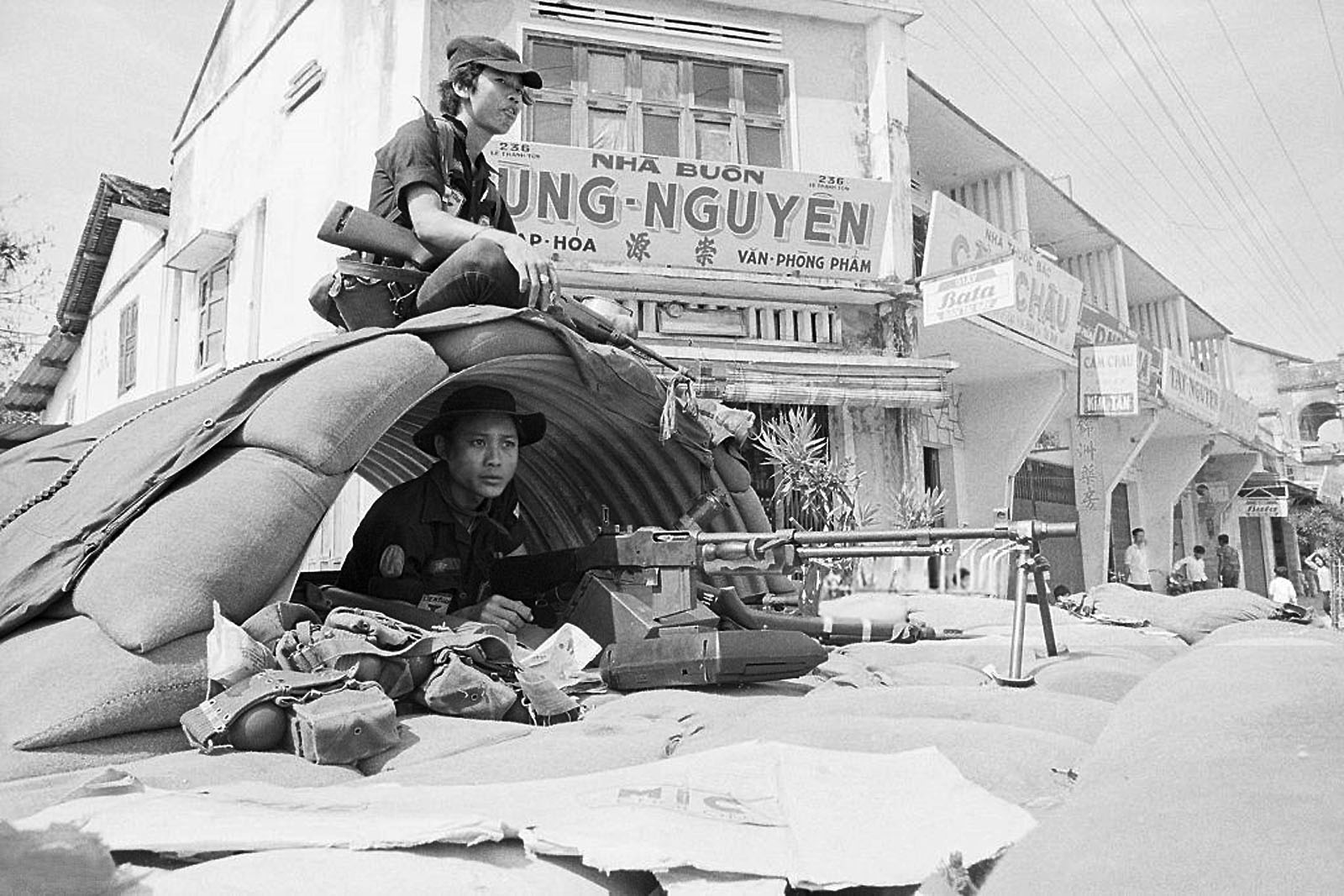
Vietnamese soldiers in 1972

Despite having a long recorded ethnic history, the formation of the ethnic Vietnamese or Kinh identity, only begun by the late 19th and early 20th century, with the help of the colonial administration. Following the colonial government's efforts of ethnic classification, nationalism, especially ethnonationalism and eugenic social Darwinism, were encouraged among the new Vietnamese intelligentsia's discourse. Ethnic tensions sparked by Vietnamese ethnonationalism peaked during the late 1940s at the beginning phase of the First Indochina War (1946–1954), which resulted in violence between Khmer and Vietnamese in the Mekong Delta.

The mid-20th century marked a pivotal turning point with the Vietnam War, a conflict that not only left an indelible impact on the nation but also had far-reaching consequences for the Vietnamese people. The war, which lasted from 1955 to 1975, resulted in significant social, economic, and political upheavals, shaping the modern history of Vietnam and its people. Following the end of the Vietnam War in 1975, the post-war era brought economic hardships and strained social dynamics, prompting resilient efforts at reconstruction, reconciliation, and the implementation of economic reforms such as the Đổi Mới policies in the late 20th century.

== Genetics ==
Several studies show close genetic affinities between the Kinh Vietnamese and Thais or Kra–Dai peoples, especially Dai people. Like Kra–Dai groups from mainland China, the Kinh possess "genetic characteristics of the Baiyue lineage." There's also evidence that the Kinh diverged from the Hlai, who have the most enriched Baiyue ancestry among Kra–Dai groups, much earlier than the Dai diverged from Hlai.

According to some studies, the Kinh can be modeled as having genetic input from a sister lineage related to the ancestors of Southern Chinese groups, and from a sister lineage related to Laotians, Malays (i.e. Proto-Malay, Negrito, and Bidayut) and Thais (i.e. Mlabri and H'tin). Gene flow between Khmers and Kinh is unidirectional with more evidence of Kinh contributing to the Khmer genome than vice versa. Likewise, there is no evidence of Chams contributing to the Kinh genome from the Nam Tiến conquests. Among ancient populations, Kinh Vietnamese are the closest to Núi Nấp and Vat Komnou populations although the latter most likely reflects shared East Asian-related ancestry. They are cladal with Iron Age and Historical Mainland Southeast Asian populations compared to other Austroasiatic-related populations.

The majority of the Kinh belong to maternal haplogroups M (39%) and N (61%). In particular, M's subhaplogroup of Haplogroup D (22%) and M7 (20%) and N's subhaplogroups of R9'F (27%) and Haplogroup B (25%) are common. In northern Vietnam, haplogroups, A, B4, F1a and G are common. Haplogroups A and C are particularly common in northwest Vietnam, with haplogroups M and M7 peaking in northeast Vietnam and settlements near the Gulf of Tonkin. Haplogroup M71 also peaks in central Vietnam. In contrast, haplogroups M and M7 are quite rare for northwest Vietnam and far south Vietnam, near the Mekong Delta. In southern Vietnam, haplogroups D (9%) and N peak (67%) and to an extent, R9'F (29%). R9'F is instead more common in the Red River Delta (32-36%), followed by central (21%) and northwest Vietnam (16%).

Meanwhile, common paternal haplogroups for Vietnamese are O1a1a2, O1b1a1a and N4-F2930.

== Religions ==
A majority of the Viet may be unaffiliated with any religion, yet practice forms of folk religion or Mahayana Buddhism. Vietnamese folk religion is not an organized religious system, but a set of local worship traditions devoted to the "thần", a term which can be translated as "spirits", "Gods" or with the more exhaustive locution "generative powers". These Gods can be nature deities or national, community or kinship tutelary deities or ancestral Gods and the ancestral Gods of a specific family. Ancestral Gods are often deified heroic persons. Vietnamese mythology preserves narratives telling of the actions of many of the cosmic Gods and cultural heroes. A significant minority of the Viet follow Christianity, which was introduced by Catholic missionaries from Iberia and France in the 16th century, and later by evangelical movements from Canada and the US.

== Diaspora ==
From northern Vietnam, the Viet have expanded south and conquered much of the land belonging to the former Champa Kingdom and post-Angkor Cambodia over the centuries. They are the dominant ethnic group in most provinces of Vietnam. Kinh Vietnamese mostly reside in the lowlands of Vietnam.

Beginning around the sixteenth century, groups of Viet migrated to Cambodia and China for commerce and political purposes. Descendants of Viet migrants in China form the Gin ethnic group in the country and primarily reside in and around Guangxi Province. Vietnamese form the largest ethnic minority group in Cambodia, at 5% of the population. Under the Khmer Rouge, they were heavily persecuted and survivors of the regime largely fled to Vietnam.

During French Indochina, Vietnam (then divided into three regions) was regarded as the most important colony in Asia, and the Viet held a higher social standing than other ethnic groups in the colony. As a result, educated Vietnamese were often trained to be placed in colonial government positions in the other Asian French colonies of Laos and Cambodia rather than locals of the respective colonies. There was also a significant representation of Vietnamese students in France during this period, primarily consisting of members of the elite class. A large number of Vietnamese also migrated to France as workers, especially during World War I and World War II, when France recruited soldiers and locals of its colonies to help with war efforts in metropolitan France. The wave of migrants to France during World War I formed the first major presence of the Vietnamese in France and the Western world.

After the First Indochina War, a number of Vietnamese migrated to France. During the partition of North Vietnam and South Vietnam, additional Vietnamese students arrived to study in France, along with individuals engaged in commerce to trade with France. Forced repatriation in 1970 and deaths during the Khmer Rouge era reduced the Vietnamese Cambodian population in Cambodia from between 250,000 and 300,000 in 1969 to a reported 56,000 in 1984.

The fall of Saigon and end of the Vietnam War prompted the start of the Vietnamese diaspora, which saw millions of Vietnamese fleeing the country from the new communist regime. Recognizing an international humanitarian crisis, many countries accepted Vietnamese refugees, primarily the United States, Australia, France, and Canada. Meanwhile, under the communist regime, tens of thousands of Vietnamese were sent to work or study in Eastern Bloc countries of Central and Eastern Europe as development aid to the Vietnamese government and for migrants to acquire skills that were to be brought home to help with development.

== See also ==
- Ethnic groups of Southeast Asia
- List of ethnic groups in Vietnam
- Baiyue
- Lạc Việt
- Nam Việt
- List of Vietnamese people
- Vietnamese clothing
- Vietnamese cuisine
- Vietnamese music
- Vietnamese name
- History of Vietnam
- Culture of Vietnam

== Bibliography ==
=== Books ===
- Akazawa, Takeru; Aoki, Kenichi; Kimura, Tasuku (1992). The evolution and dispersal of modern humans in Asia. Hokusen-sha. ISBN 978-4-938424-41-1.
- Anderson, David (2005). The Vietnam War (Twentieth Century Wars). Palgrave. ISBN 978-0-333-96337-1.
- Alterman, Eric (2005). When Presidents Lie: A History of Official Deception and Its Consequences. Penguin. ISBN 978-0-14-303604-3.
- Anderson, James A.; Whitmore, John K. (2014). China's Encounters on the South and Southwest: Reforging the Fiery Frontier Over Two Millennia. Brill Publishers. ISBN 978-90-04-28248-3.
- Bellwood, Peter; Glover, Ian, eds. (2004). Southeast Asia: From Prehistory to History. Routledge. ISBN 978-0-415-29777-6.
- Brigham, Robert Kendall (1998). Guerrilla Diplomacy: The NLF's Foreign Relations and the Viet Nam War. Cornell University Press. ISBN 978-0-8014-3317-7.
- Brindley, Erica (2015). Ancient China and the Yue: Perceptions and Identities on the Southern Frontier, c.400 BCE–50 CE. Cambridge University Press. ISBN 978-1-107-08478-0.
- Buttinger, Joseph (1958). The Smaller Dragon: A Political History of Vietnam. Praeger Publishers.
- Buttinger, Joseph (1968). Vietnam: A Political History. Praeger.
- Chua, Amy (2003). World On Fire. Knopf Doubleday Publishing. ISBN 978-0-385-72186-8.
- Chua, Amy (2018). Political Tribes: Group Instinct and the Fate of Nations. Penguin Press. ISBN 978-0-399-56285-3.
- Cima, Ronald J. (1987). Vietnam: A Country Study. United States Library of Congress. ISBN 978-0-16-018143-6.
- Cook, Bernard A. (2001). Europe Since 1945: An Encyclopedia. Taylor & Francis. ISBN 978-0-8153-4057-7.
- Cortada, James W. (1994). Spain in the Nineteenth-century World: Essays on Spanish Diplomacy, 1789–1898. Greenwood Press. ISBN 978-0-313-27655-2.
- Cottrell, Robert C. (2009). Vietnam. Infobase Publishing. ISBN 978-1-4381-2147-5.
- Đào Duy Anh (2016) [1964]. Đất nước Việt Nam qua các đời: nghiên cứu địa lý học lịch sử Việt Nam (in Vietnamese). Nha Nam. ISBN 978-604-94-8700-2.
- Dennell, Robin; Porr, Martin (2014). Southern Asia, Australia, and the Search for Human Origins. Cambridge University Press. ISBN 978-1-107-72913-1.
- van Dijk, Ruud; Gray, William Glenn; Savranskaya, Svetlana; Suri, Jeremi; et al. (2013). Encyclopedia of the Cold War. Routledge. ISBN 978-1-135-92311-2.
- DK (2017). The Vietnam War: The Definitive Illustrated History. Dorling Kindersley Limited. ISBN 978-0-241-30868-4.
- Dohrenwend, Bruce P.; Turse, Nick; Wall, Melanie M.; Yager, Thomas J. (2018). Surviving Vietnam: Psychological Consequences of the War for US Veterans. Oxford University Press. ISBN 978-0-19-090444-9.
- Duy Hinh, Nguyen; Dinh Tho, Tran (2015). The South Vietnamese Society. Normanby Press. ISBN 978-1-78625-513-6.
- Eggleston, Michael A. (2014). Exiting Vietnam: The Era of Vietnamization and American Withdrawal Revealed in First-Person Accounts. McFarland Publishing. ISBN 978-0-7864-7772-2.
- Elliott, Mai (2010). RAND in Southeast Asia: A History of the Vietnam War Era. RAND Corporation. ISBN 978-0-8330-4915-5.
- Fitzgerald, C. P (1972). The Southern Expansion of the Chinese People. Barrie & Jenkins.
- Frankum, Ronald B. Jr. (2011). Historical Dictionary of the War in Vietnam. Scarecrow Press. ISBN 978-0-8108-7956-0.
- Gettleman, Marvin E.; Franklin, Jane; Young, Marilyn B.; Franklin, H. Bruce (1995). Vietnam and America: A Documented History. Grove Press. ISBN 978-0-8021-3362-5.
- Gibbons, William Conrad (2014). The U.S. Government and the Vietnam War: Executive and Legislative Roles and Relationships, Part III: 1965–1966. Princeton University Press. ISBN 978-1-4008-6153-8.
- Gilbert, Adrian (2013). Encyclopedia of Warfare: From the Earliest Times to the Present Day. Taylor & Francis. ISBN 978-1-135-95697-4.
- Gravel, Mike (1971). The Pentagon Papers: The Defense Department History of United States Decision-making on Vietnam. Beacon Press. ISBN 978-0-8070-0526-2.
- Gunn, Geoffrey C. (2014). Rice Wars in Colonial Vietnam: The Great Famine and the Viet Minh Road to Power. Rowman & Littlefield Publishers. ISBN 978-1-4422-2303-5.
- Hampson, Fen Osler (1996). Nurturing Peace: Why Peace Settlements Succeed Or Fail. US Institute of Peace Press. ISBN 978-1-878379-55-9.
- Heneghan, George Martin (1969). Nationalism, Communism and the National Liberation Front of Vietnam: Dilemma for American Foreign Policy. Department of Political Science, Stanford University.
- Hiẻ̂n Lê, Năng (2003). Three victories on the Bach Dang river. Nhà xuất bản Văn hóa-thông tin.
- Hoàng, Anh Tuấn (2007). Silk for Silver: Dutch-Vietnamese Relations, 1637–1700. Brill Publishers. ISBN 978-90-04-15601-2.
- Holmgren, Jennifer (1980). Chinese Colonization of Northern Vietnam: Administrative Geography and Political Development in the Tonking Delta, First To Sixth Centuries A.D. Australian National University Press.
- Hong Lien, Vu; Sharrock, Peter (2014). Descending Dragon, Rising Tiger: A History of Vietnam. Reaktion Books. ISBN 978-1-78023-388-8.
- Howe, Brendan M. (2016). Post-Conflict Development in East Asia. Routledge. ISBN 978-1-317-07740-4.
- Hyunh, Kim Khanh (1986). Vietnamese Communism, 1925–1945. Cornell University Press. ISBN 978-0-8014-9397-3.
- Isserman, Maurice; Bowman, John Stewart (2009). Vietnam War. Infobase Publishing. ISBN 978-1-4381-0015-9.
- Jamieson, Neil L (1995). Understanding Vietnam. University of California Press. ISBN 978-0-520-20157-6.
- Joes, Anthony James (1992). Modern Guerrilla Insurgency. ABC-CLIO. ISBN 978-0-275-94263-2.
- Jukes, Geoffrey (1973). The Soviet Union in Asia. University of California Press. ISBN 978-0-520-02393-2.
- von Dewall, Magdalene (2003). "Towards an archaeological discourse on bronze and the social life of things in Southeast Asian late Bronze Age mortuary practice". In Karlström, Anna; Källén, Anna (eds.). Fishbones and Glittering Emblems: Southeast Asian Archaeology 2002. Östasiatiska Samlingarna (Stockholm, Sweden), European Association of Southeast Asian Archaeologists. 9th International Conference. Museum of Far Eastern Antiquities, Stockholm. pp. 80–96. ISBN 978-91-970616-0-5. OCLC 56213568.
- Keith, Charles (2012). Catholic Vietnam: A Church from Empire to Nation. University of California Press. ISBN 978-0-520-95382-6.
- Kelley, Liam C. (2014). "Constructing Local Narratives: Spirits, Dreams, and Prophecies in the Medieval Red River Delta". In Anderson, James A.; Whitmore, John K. (eds.). China's Encounters on the South and Southwest: Reforging the Fiery Frontier Over Two Millennia. United States: Brills. pp. 78–106. ISBN 978-9-004-28248-3.
- Kelley, Liam C. (2016), "Inventing Traditions in Fifteenth-century Vietnam", in Mair, Victor H.; Kelley, Liam C. (eds.), Imperial China and its southern neighbours, Institute of Southeast Asian Studies, pp. 161–193, ISBN 978-9-81462-055-0
- Keyes, Charles F. (1995). The Golden Peninsula: Culture and Adaptation in Mainland Southeast Asia. University of Hawaii Press. ISBN 978-0-8248-1696-4.
- Khánh Huỳnh, Kim (1986). Vietnamese Communism, 1925–1945. Cornell University Press. ISBN 978-0-8014-9397-3.
- Khoo, Nicholas (2011). Collateral Damage: Sino-Soviet Rivalry and the Termination of the Sino-Vietnamese Alliance. Columbia University Press. ISBN 978-0-231-15078-1.
- Kiernan, Ben (2017). Việt Nam: A History from Earliest Times to the Present. Oxford University Press. ISBN 978-0-19-516076-5.
- Kiernan, Ben (2019). Việt Nam: a history from earliest time to the present. Oxford University Press. ISBN 978-0-19-005379-6.
- Kissi, Edward (2006). Revolution and Genocide in Ethiopia and Cambodia. Lexington Books. ISBN 978-0-7391-1263-2.
- Kleeman, Terry F. (1998). Ta Ch'eng, Great Perfection – Religion and Ethnicity in a Chinese Millennial Kingdom. University of Hawaii Press. ISBN 0-8248-1800-8.
- Kort, Michael (2017). The Vietnam War Re-Examined. Cambridge University Press. ISBN 978-1-107-04640-5.
- Largo, V. (2002). Vietnam: Current Issues and Historical Background. Nova Science. ISBN 978-1-59033-368-6.
- Leonard, Jane Kate (1984). Wei Yuan and China's Rediscovery of the Maritime World. Harvard Univ Asia Center. ISBN 978-0-674-94855-6.
- Lewy, Guenter (1980). America in Vietnam. Oxford University Press. ISBN 978-0-19-991352-7.
- Li, Tana (1998). Cornell University. Southeast Asia Program (ed.). Nguyễn Cochinchina: Southern Vietnam in the Seventeenth and Eighteenth Centuries. Vol. 23 of Studies on Southeast Asia (illustrated ed.). SEAP Publications. ISBN 0-87727-722-2.
- Li, Xiaobing (2012). China at War: An Encyclopedia. ABC-CLIO. ISBN 978-1-59884-415-3.
- Lieberman, Victor (2003). Strange Parallels: Integration of the Mainland Southeast Asia in Global Context, c. 800–1830, Vol 1. Cambridge University Press.
- Lim, David (2014). Economic Growth and Employment in Vietnam. Taylor & Francis. ISBN 978-1-317-81859-5.
- Lockard, Craig A. (2010). Societies, Networks, and Transitions, Volume 2: Since 1450. Cengage Learning. ISBN 978-1-4390-8536-3.
- Marsh, Sean (2016), "CLOTHES MAKE THE MAN: Body Culture and Ethnic Boundaries on the Lingnan Frontier in the Southern Song", in Mair, Victor H.; Kelley, Liam C. (eds.), Imperial China and its southern neighbours, Institute of Southeast Asian Studies, pp. 80–110
- McLeod, Mark W. (1991). The Vietnamese Response to French Intervention, 1862–1874. Greenwood Publishing Group. ISBN 978-0-275-93562-7.
- Meggle, Georg (2004). Ethics of Humanitarian Interventions. Walter de Gruyter. ISBN 978-3-11-032773-1.
- Miksic, John Norman; Yian, Go Geok (2016). Ancient Southeast Asia. Taylor & Francis. ISBN 978-1-317-27903-7.
- Miller, Robert Hopkins (1990). United States and Vietnam 1787–1941. DIANE Publishing. ISBN 978-0-7881-0810-5.
- Moïse, Edwin E. (2017). Land Reform in China and North Vietnam: Consolidating the Revolution at the Village Level. University of North Carolina Press. ISBN 978-0-8078-7445-5.
- Muehlenbeck, Philip Emil; Muehlenbeck, Philip (2012). Religion and the Cold War: A Global Perspective. Vanderbilt University Press. ISBN 978-0-8265-1852-1.
- Murphey, Rhoads (1997). East Asia: A New History. Pearson. ISBN 978-0-205-69522-5.
- Murray, Geoffrey (1997). Vietnam Dawn of a New Market. St. Martin's Press. ISBN 978-0-312-17392-0.
- Neville, Peter (2007). Britain in Vietnam: Prelude to Disaster, 1945–46. Routledge. ISBN 978-1-134-24476-8.
- Olsen, Mari (2007). Soviet-Vietnam Relations and the Role of China 1949–64: Changing Alliances. Routledge. ISBN 978-1-134-17413-3.
- Olson, Gregory A. (2012). Mansfield and Vietnam: A Study in Rhetorical Adaptation. MSU Press. ISBN 978-0-87013-941-3.
- Ooi, Keat Gin (2004). Southeast Asia: A Historical Encyclopedia, from Angkor Wat to East Timor. ABC-CLIO. ISBN 978-1-57607-770-2.
- Ooi, Keat Gin; Anh Tuan, Hoang (2015). Early Modern Southeast Asia, 1350–1800. Routledge. ISBN 978-1-317-55919-1.
- Oxenham, Marc; Buckley, Hallie (2015). The Routledge Handbook of Bioarchaeology in Southeast Asia and the Pacific Islands. Routledge. ISBN 978-1-317-53401-3.
- Oxenham, Marc; Tayles, Nancy (2006). Bioarchaeology of Southeast Asia. Cambridge University Press. ISBN 978-0-521-82580-1.
- Page, Melvin Eugene; Sonnenburg, Penny M. (2003). Colonialism: An International, Social, Cultural, and Political Encyclopedia. ABC-CLIO. ISBN 978-1-57607-335-3.
- Phan, Huy Lê; Nguyễn, Quang Ngọc; Nguyễn, Đình Lễ (1997). The Country Life in the Red River Delta.
- Phuong Linh, Huynh Thi (2016). State-Society Interaction in Vietnam. LIT Verlag Münster. ISBN 978-3-643-90719-6.
- Pike, Francis (2011). Empires at War: A Short History of Modern Asia Since World War II. I.B.Tauris. ISBN 978-0-85773-029-9.
- Rabett, Ryan J. (2012). Human Adaptation in the Asian Palaeolithic: Hominin Dispersal and Behaviour During the Late Quaternary. Cambridge University Press. ISBN 978-1-107-01829-7.
- Ramsay, Jacob (2008). Mandarins and Martyrs: The Church and the Nguyen Dynasty in Early Nineteenth-century Vietnam. Stanford University Press. ISBN 978-0-8047-7954-8.
- Richardson, John (1876). A school manual of modern geography. Physical and political. Publisher not identified.
- Schafer, Edward Hetzel (1967), The Vermilion Bird: T'ang Images of the South, Los Angeles: University of California Press, ISBN 978-0-520-01145-8
- Smith, T. (2007). Britain and the Origins of the Vietnam War: UK Policy in Indo-China, 1943–50. Palgrave Macmillan UK. ISBN 978-0-230-59166-0.
- Taylor, Keith Weller (1983). The Birth of the Vietnam. University of California Press. ISBN 978-0-520-07417-0.
- Taylor, Keith W. (2013). A History of the Vietnamese. Cambridge University Press. ISBN 978-1-107-24435-1.
- Thomas, Martin (2012). Rubber, coolies and communists: In Violence and Colonial Order: Police, Workers and Protest in the European Colonial Empires, 1918–1940 (Critical Perspectives on Empire from Part II – Colonial case studies: French, British and Belgian). pp. 141–176. doi:10.1017/CBO9781139045643.009. ISBN 978-1-139-04564-3.
- Tonnesson, Stein (2011). Vietnam 1946: How the War Began. University of California Press. ISBN 978-0-520-26993-4.
- Tran, Anh Q. (2017). Gods, Heroes, and Ancestors: An Interreligious Encounter in Eighteenth-Century Vietnam. Vol. 1. doi:10.1093/oso/9780190677602.001.0001. ISBN 978-0-19-067760-2.
- Tucker, Spencer (1999). Vietnam. University of Kentucky Press. ISBN 978-0-8131-2121-5.
- Tucker, Spencer C. (2011). The Encyclopedia of the Vietnam War: A Political, Social, and Military History [4 volumes] (2nd ed.). ABC-CLIO. ISBN 978-1-85109-961-0.
- Turner, Robert F. (1975). Vietnamese communism, its origins and development. Hoover Institution Press, Stanford University. ISBN 978-0-8179-6431-3.
- Vo, Nghia M. (2011). Saigon: A History. McFarland & Company. ISBN 978-0-7864-8634-2.
- Waite, James (2012). The End of the First Indochina War: A Global History. Routledge. ISBN 978-1-136-27334-6.
- Walker, Hugh Dyson (2012). East Asia: A New History. AuthorHouse. ISBN 978-1-4772-6516-1.
- Willbanks, James H. (2013). Vietnam War Almanac: An In-Depth Guide to the Most Controversial Conflict in American History. Skyhorse Publishing. ISBN 978-1-62636-528-5.
- Woods, L. Shelton (2002). Vietnam: a global studies handbook. ABC-CLIO. ISBN 978-1-57607-416-9.
- Yü, Ying-shih (1986), "Han foreign relations", in Twitchett, Denis C.; Fairbank, John King (eds.), The Cambridge History of China: Volume 1, The Ch'in and Han Empires, 221 BC-AD 220, Cambridge: Cambridge University Press, pp. 377–463

=== Journal articles and theses ===
- Crozier, Brian (1955). "The Diem Regime in Southern Vietnam". Far Eastern Survey. 24 (4): 49–56. doi:10.2307/3023970. JSTOR 3023970.
- Gallup, Luke John (September 2002). The Wage Labor Market and Inequality in Vietnam in the 1990s (Report). Policy Research Working Papers. doi:10.1596/1813-9450-2896. hdl:10986/19272.
- Gittinger, J. Price (1959). "Communist Land Policy in North Viet Nam". Far Eastern Survey. 28 (8): 113–126. doi:10.2307/3024603. JSTOR 3024603.
- Goodkind, Daniel (1995). "Rising Gender Inequality in Vietnam Since Reunification". Pacific Affairs. 68 (3): 342–359. doi:10.2307/2761129. JSTOR 2761129.
- Hirschman, Charles; Preston, Samuel; Vu, Manh Loi (1995). "Vietnamese Casualties During the American War: A New Estimate". Population and Development Review. 21 (4): 783–812. doi:10.2307/2137774. JSTOR 2137774.
- Maspero, Henri (1912). "Etudes sur la phonétique historique de la langue annamite. Les initiales". Bulletin de l'École Française d'Extrême-Orient (in French). 12: 1–124. doi:10.3406/befeo.1912.2713.
- Matsumura, Hirofumi; Nguyen, Lan Cuong; Nguyen, Kim Thuy; Anezaki, Tomoko (2001). "Dental Morphology of the Early Hoabinian, the Neolithic Da But and the Metal Age Dong Son Civilized Peoples in Vietnam". Zeitschrift für Morphologie und Anthropologie. 83 (1): 59–73. doi:10.1127/zma/83/2001/59. JSTOR 25757578. PMID 11372468.
- Matsumura, Hirofumi; Yoneda, Minoru; Yukio, Dodo; Oxenham, Marc; et al. (2008). "Terminal Pleistocene human skeleton from Hang Cho Cave, northern Vietnam: implications for the biological affinities of Hoabinhian people". Anthropological Science. 116 (3): 201–217. doi:10.1537/ase.070416.
- Ngo, Lan A. (2016). Nguyễn–Catholic History (1770s–1890s) and the Gestation of Vietnamese Catholic National Identity (PhD thesis). Georgetown University Graduate School of Arts and Sciences. hdl:10822/1040724.
- Nhu Nguyen, Quynh Thi (2016). "The Vietnamese Values System: A Blend of Oriental, Western and Socialist Values" (PDF). International Education Studies. 9 (12). Archived from the original (PDF) on 15 October 2018 – via Institute of Education Sciences.
- Obermeyer, Ziad; Murray, Christopher J L; Gakidou, Emmanuela (2008). "Fifty years of violent war deaths from Vietnam to Bosnia: analysis of data from the world health survey programme [Table 3]". BMJ. 336 (7659): 1482–6. doi:10.1136/bmj.a137. PMC 2440905. PMID 18566045.
- Odell, Andrew L.; Castillo, Marlene F. (2008). "Vietnam in a Nutshell: An Historical, Political and Commercial Overview" (PDF). NYBSA International Law Practicum. 21 (2). Archived from the original (PDF) on 12 October 2018 – via Duane Morris.
- Quach, Thanh Tâm (1991). "Charles Fourniau: Annam-Tonkin 1885-1896. Lettrés et paysans vietnamiens face à la conquête coloniale. Travaux du Centre d'Histoire et Civilisations de la péninsule Indochinoise". Bulletin de l'École Française d'Extrême-Orient. 78 (1): 360–363.
- Taylor, Keith (1980). "An Evaluation of the Chinese Period in Vietnamese History". The Journal of Asiatic Studies. 23 (1).
- Vu, Tuong (2016), State formation on China's southern frontier: Vietnam as a shadow empire and hegemon, HumaNetten Nr 37Hösten
- Wagstaff, Adam; van Doorslaer, Eddy; Watanabe, Naoko (January 2003). "On decomposing the causes of health sector inequalities with an application to malnutrition inequalities in Vietnam". Journal of Econometrics. 112 (1): 207–223. doi:10.1016/S0304-4076(02)00161-6. hdl:10986/19426.
- Zinoman, Peter (January 2000). "Colonial Prisons and Anti-colonial Resistance in French Indochina: The Thai Nguyen Rebellion, 1917". Modern Asian Studies. 34 (1): 57–98. doi:10.1017/S0026749X00003590.

=== Web sources ===
- BBC News (1997). "Vietnam: changing of the guard". BBC News.
- Gillet, Kit (2011). "Riding Vietnam's Ho Chi Minh trail". The Guardian.
- McKinney, Brennan (2009). "The Human Migration: Homo Erectus and the Ice Age". Yahoo! Voices. Archived from the original on 12 November 2012.
- The New York Times (3 July 1976). "2 Parts of Vietnam Officially Reunited; Leadership Chosen". The New York Times.
- Shenon, Philip (23 April 1995). "20 Years After Victory, Vietnamese Communists Ponder How to Celebrate". The New York Times.
- Spokesman-Review (1977). "Vietnam outlines collectivization goals". The Spokesman-Review.
- Thanh Niên (2015). "Horrific photos recall Vietnamese Famine of 1945". Vo An Ninh. Thanh Niên. Archived from the original on 31 October 2018.
- Vietnam Net (2015). "Rare photos of Vietnam's famine in 1945". Vo An Ninh. Vietnam Net. Archived from the original on 16 October 2018.
