= An Lão =

An Lão may refer to several places in Vietnam, including:

- An Lão District, Bình Định
- An Lão District, Haiphong
- An Lão, Bình Định, a township and capital of An Lão District
- An Lão, Haiphong, a township and capital of An Lão District
