= An Dương, Haiphong =

Coordinates: 20°51′47″N 106°36′50″E

An Dương Phường An Dương
- Cao Linh Temple
- Interactive map of An Dương
- Country: Vietnam
- Region: Red River Delta
- Municipality: Haiphong
- Established: 16/06/2025

Government
  - Type: Ward-level authority

Area
  - Total: 31.23 km^{2} (12.06 sq mi)

Population (2025)
  - Total: 76,879
  - Density: 2,462/km^{2} (6,376/sq mi)
  - Ethnicities: Kinh; Others
- Time zone: UTC+7
- Administrative code: 11581
- Website: http://anduong.haiphong.gov.vn/

An Dương is a ward in Haiphong, Vietnam. It is situated on the Red River Delta.

== Geography ==
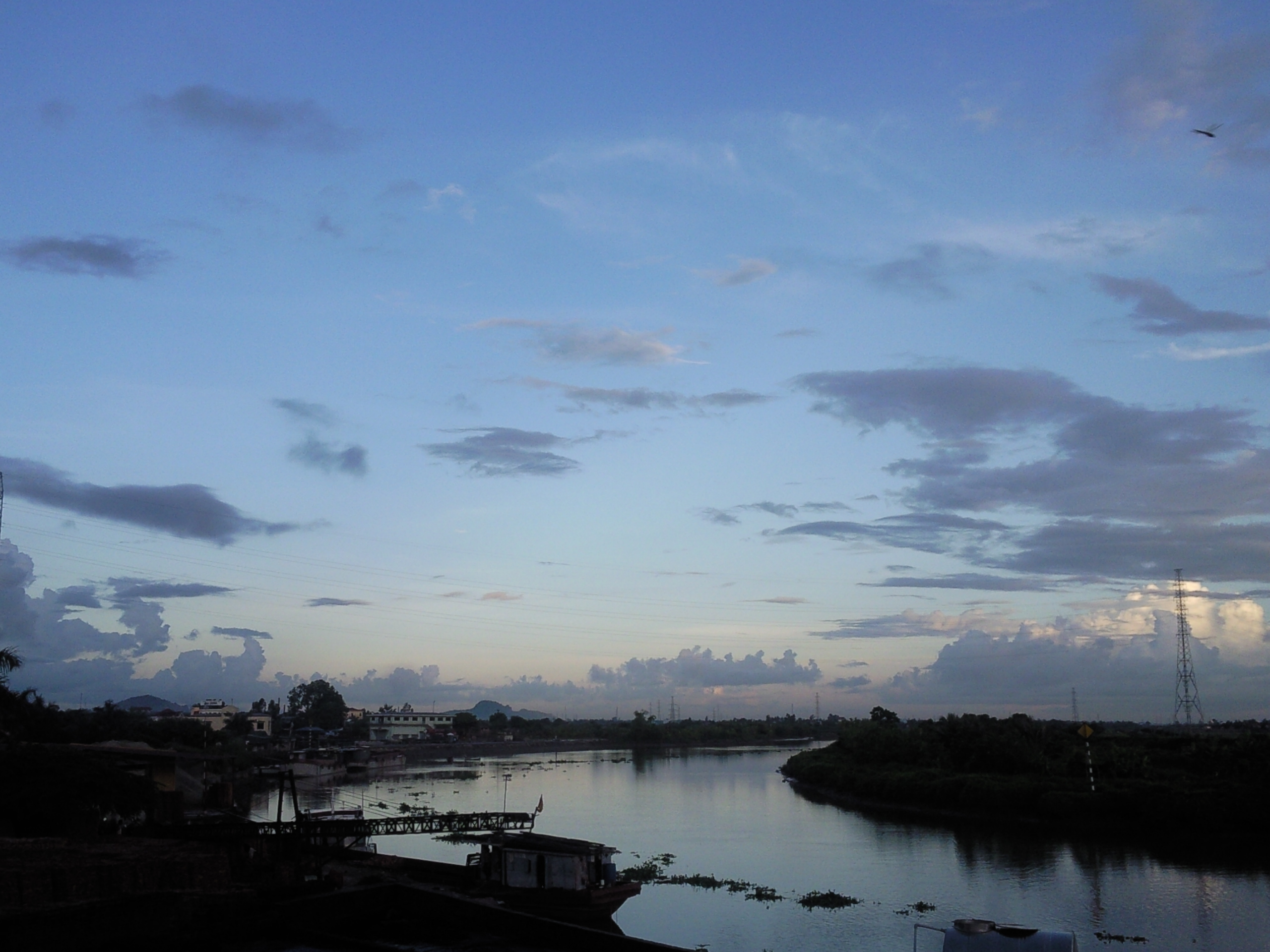
Lạch Tray River

=== Adjacent wards ===
These are the wards that are adjacent to An Dương:

- To the north, it borders Hồng An.
- To the south, it borders An Lão and An Trường.
- To the east, it borders An Hải.
- To the west, it borders An Phong.

=== Rivers ===
Inside of An Dương, there is also the Ré River which separates the ward into two.

On the southern border of An Lão and An Trường, It is separated by the Lạch Tray River.

== History ==
On June 16, 2025, the Standing Committee of the National Assembly issued a resolution on the rearrangement of commune-level administrative units in Haiphong city in 2025. Accordingly, the entire area of Nam Sơn, and a part of An Hải, Lê Lợi, Đồng Thái, Tân Tiến and An Hưng wards were rearranged into the now, An Dương ward.

== Administration ==
An Dương has 52 residential groups: 1, 1 Do Nha, 1 Kinh Giao, 1 Tràng Duệ, 2, 2 Do Nha, 2 Kinh Giao, 2 Tràng Duệ, 3, 3 Do Nha, 3 Tràng Duệ, 4, 4 Tràng Duệ, 5, 5 Do Nha, 5 Tràng Duệ, 6, 6 Do Nha, 7, 8, Bắc, Bắc Hà, Cách Hạ, Cách Thượng, Chiến Thắng, Cống Mỹ, Dân Hạnh, Đoàn Tiến, Đông, Đông Hà, Đông Lương Quy, Đồng Quang, Giữa Lương Quy, Hà Liên, Hòa Nhất, Kiều Hạ 1, Kiều Hạ 2, Kiều Thượng, Lương Quán, Mỹ Tranh, Nam Hà, Ngoài Lương Quy, Nhất Trí, Nhu Kiều, Quỳnh Hoàng, Quỳnh Minh, Tây Hà, Tây Nam Vụ Bản, Thành Công, Trạm Bạc, Tự Lập, and Văn Xá.

== Transportation ==
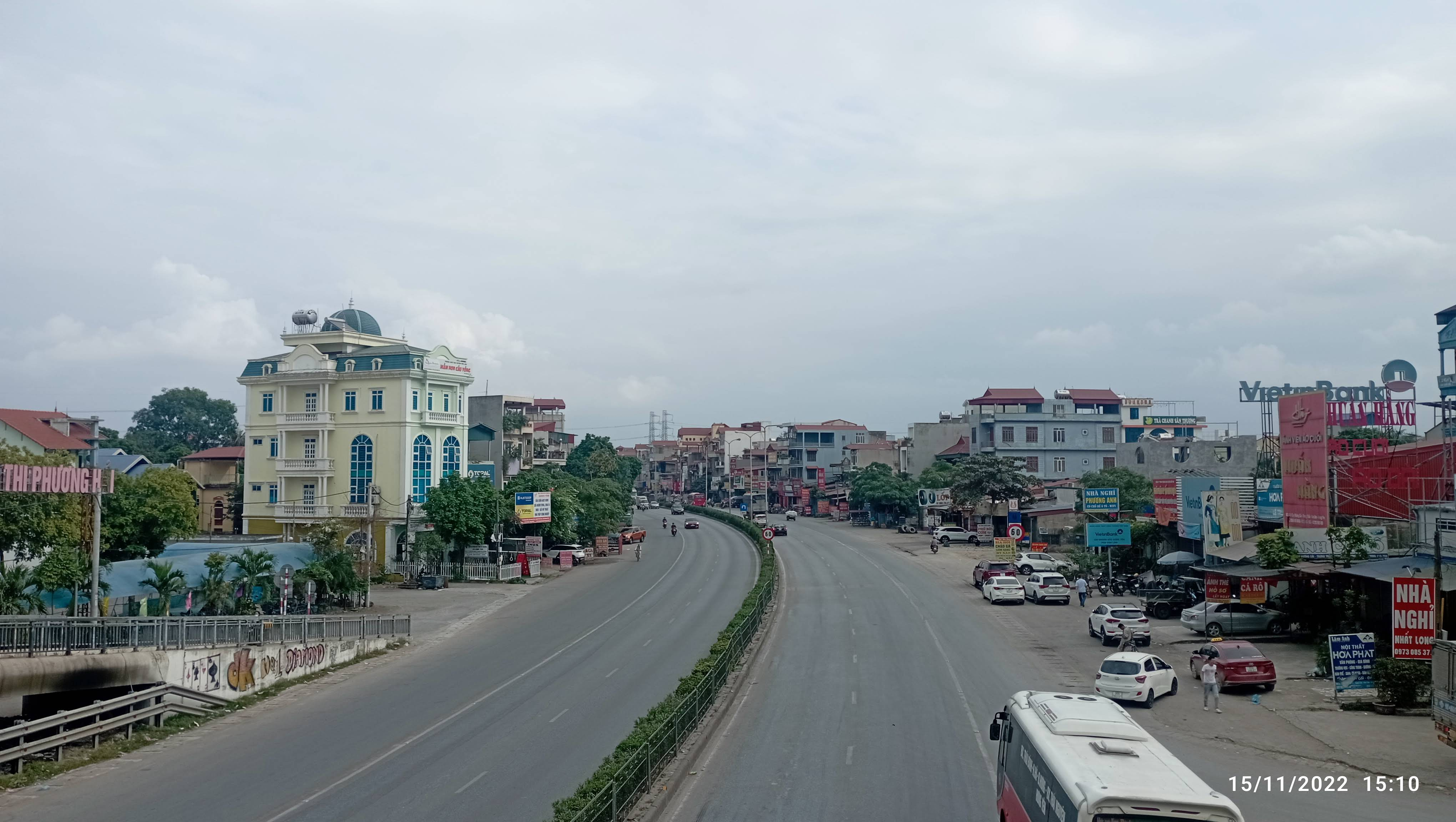
National Route 5.

An Dương is also served by National Route 5 and National Route 10.
