= An Biên, Haiphong =

An Biên Phường An Biên
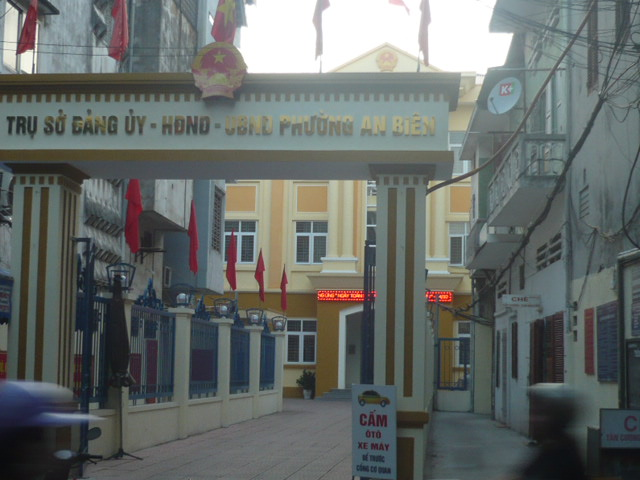
- The old People's Committee of An Biên
- Interactive map of An Biên
- Coordinates: 20°50′03″N 106°40′20″E
- Country: Vietnam
- Region: Red River Delta
- Municipality: Haiphong
- Established: 16/06/2025

Government
  - Type: Ward-level authority

Area
  - Total: 6.56 km^{2} (2.53 sq mi)

Population (2025)
  - Total: 116,091
  - Density: 17,700/km^{2} (45,800/sq mi)
  - Ethnicities: Kinh; Others
- Time zone: UTC+7
- Administrative code: 11407
- Website: https://anbien.haiphong.gov.vn/

An Biên is a ward in Haiphong, Vietnam. It is situated on the Red River Delta.

== Geography ==
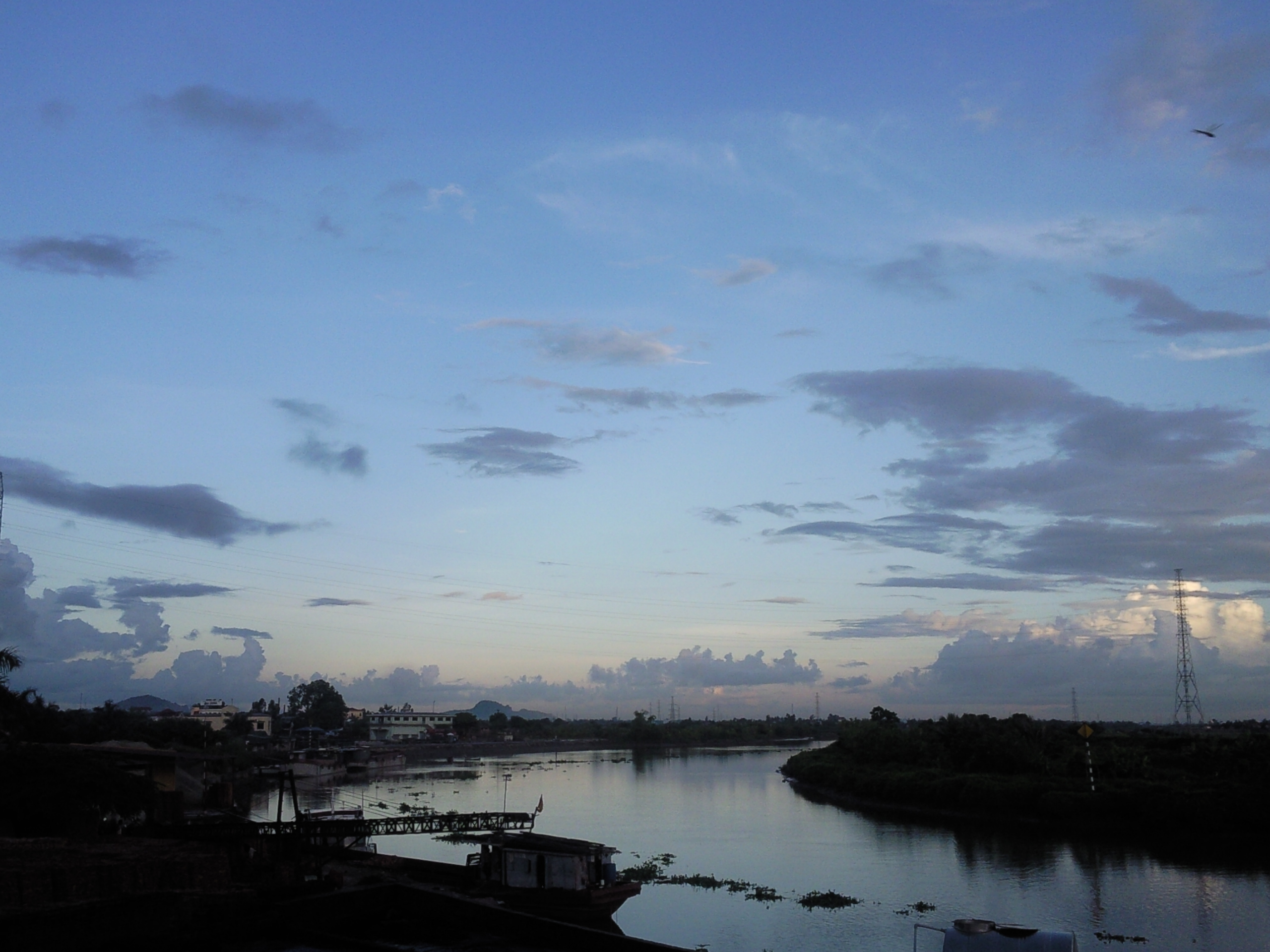
Lạch Tray River

=== Adjacent wards ===
- Borders Hồng Bàng to the north.
- Borders Lê Chân to the east.
- Borders Hưng Đạo to the south.
- Borders Kiến An and An Hải.

=== Rivers ===
The southern border with Hưng Đạo is separated by the Lạch Tray river.

== History ==
On June 16, 2025, the Standing Committee of the National Assembly issued a resolution on the rearrangement of commune-level administrative units in Haiphong city in 2025. Accordingly, the entire area and population of An Dương and the remaining parts of the old An Biên ward, Trần Nguyên Hãn, and Vĩnh Niệm wards after rearrangement as prescribed in clause 12 of this article into An Biên.

== Administration ==
An Biên has 65 residential groups/neighborhoods, numbered from 1 to 65.
