= Jed Rubenfeld =

American lawyer and novelist

- Born: 1959 (age 66–67); Washington, D.C., U.S.
- Education: Princeton University (BA); Juilliard School (attended); Harvard University (JD)
- Notable work: The Interpretation of Murder (2006); The Triple Package (2014)
- Spouse: Amy Chua
- Children: 2

Jed L. Rubenfeld (born 1959) is an American legal scholar and professor of law at Yale Law School. From 2000 to 2020, he served as the Robert R. Slaughter Professor of Law at Yale University. Rubenfeld is an expert on constitutional law, privacy, and the First Amendment.

Rubenfeld joined the Yale faculty in 1990 and was appointed to a full professorship in 1994. He has served as a United States representative at the Council of Europe and has taught as a visiting professor at both the Stanford Law School and the Duke University School of Law. He is also the author of two novels, including the million-copy bestseller, The Interpretation of Murder.

== Early life and education ==
Rubenfeld was born to a Jewish family and raised in Washington, D.C. His father was a psychotherapist and his mother was an art critic. He graduated summa cum laude from Princeton University with a Bachelor of Arts in 1980. He also studied theater in the Drama Division of the Juilliard School between 1980 and 1982 and attended Harvard Law School from 1983 to 1986, graduating with a Juris Doctor, magna cum laude.

== Career ==
Rubenfeld clerked for Judge Joseph T. Sneed on the United States Court of Appeals for the Ninth Circuit in 1986–1987. After his clerkship, he worked as an associate at Wachtell, Lipton, Rosen & Katz and as an assistant U.S. Attorney in the Southern District of New York.

Rubenfeld is the author of numerous publications and books, including Freedom and Time: A Theory of Constitutional Self-Government, Revolution by Judiciary, and most recently The Triple Package: How Three Unlikely Traits Explain the Rise and Fall of Cultural Groups in America, which he co-wrote with his wife Amy Chua, best known for her 2011 book Battle Hymn of the Tiger Mother.

His scholarship has focused on American constitutional law with particular focus on the First Amendment, which he has articulated as codifying an "anti-orthodoxy principle." He has written widely cited articles defending a constitutional right to abortion, same-sex marriage, strong protections against surveillance, and the legality of affirmative action. Rubenfeld's work has been praised by peers within the legal academy. Professor Akhil Amar has described him as "the most gifted constitutional theorist (not to mention the most elegant legal writer) of his generation," and the Law and Politics Book Review called Rubenfeld "a leading contemporary thinker in constitutional interpretation whose ideas will help shape this field for some time."

More recently, Rubenfeld has become one of the country's leading scholars on the constitutional implications of social media censorship, arguing that government pressure combined with behind-the-scenes communications and concerted action can turn social media censorship into a First Amendment violation. He has argued this theory in federal court, representing Children's Health Defense, a non-profit organization that publishes about supposed harms associated with vaccines, in a lawsuit against Facebook. Rubenfeld has questioned the legality of the environmental, social, and corporate governance (ESG) practices of large asset managers, arguing that fiduciaries who prioritize social-impact investing may be violating their duty of loyalty.

=== Misconduct allegations, suspension, and reinstatement ===
Beginning in the summer of 2018, Rubenfeld was investigated by Yale Law School for allegations of sexual misconduct and inappropriate conduct, particularly towards female students, with the investigation being conducted by Title IX investigator Jenn Davis. The school promised a thorough investigation of any potential faculty misconduct, also looking into reported misconduct by his wife, Amy Chua. Rubenfeld and Chua denied all allegations.

Rubenfeld responded to the investigation in a statement to The Guardian, writing, "For some years, I have contended with personal attacks and false allegations in reaction to my writing on difficult and controversial but important topics in the law. I have reason to suspect I am now facing more of the same. While I believe strongly that universities must conduct appropriate reviews of any allegations of misconduct, I am also deeply concerned about the intensifying challenges to the most basic values of due process and free, respectful academic expression and exchange at Yale and around the country. Nevertheless, I stand ready to engage with this process in the hope that it can be expeditiously concluded." Rubenfeld has repeatedly denied the allegations against him, stating that he has “never sexually harassed anyone, whether verbally or otherwise.”

In response to the investigation of Rubenfeld, the Yale Daily News quoted a former student saying "It was not a surprise to basically any woman in my class that this investigation is going on," that some students were afraid to speak out against Rubenfeld and his wife because of their reputation for securing prestigious clerkships for law students, and that "the idea of retaliation" when it came to getting prestigious clerkships was "very real." In October 2020, some Yale Law students demanded that Rubenfeld be permanently removed from campus.

Rubenfeld was suspended from August 2020 through May 2022 following the investigation. He resumed teaching in Fall of 2022. Rubenfeld declined to answer whether he was being paid by Yale during suspension.

== Personal life ==
Rubenfeld resides in New Haven, Connecticut, and is married to Yale Law School professor Amy Chua, author of the books World on Fire: How Exporting Free Market Democracy Breeds Ethnic Hatred and Global Instability and Battle Hymn of the Tiger Mother. The couple co-wrote The Triple Package: How Three Unlikely Traits Explain the Rise and Fall of Cultural Groups in America.

Rubenfeld and Chua have two daughters.

== Bibliography ==
- Freedom and Time: A Theory of Constitutional Self-Government (2001)
- Revolution by Judiciary: The Structure of American Constitutional Law (2005)
- The Interpretation of Murder (2006), his first novel, was a number one bestseller in the United Kingdom, and sold over a million copies worldwide.
- The Death Instinct (2010), his second novel, a mystery-thriller, uses the 1920 Wall Street bombing as a key plot element.
- The Triple Package: How Three Unlikely Traits Explain the Rise and Fall of Cultural Groups in America (2014) with Amy Chua
