= The Interpretation of Murder =

2006 novel by Jed Rubenfeld

- First edition (US)
- Author: Jed Rubenfeld
- Language: English
- Genre: Mystery novel
- Publisher: Henry Holt and Company (US); Headline (UK)
- Publication date: 2006
- Publication place: United States
- Media type: Print (Hardback & Paperback)
- Pages: 384
- ISBN: 978-0-8050-8098-8 (Hardcover)
- OCLC: 65302409
- Dewey Decimal: 813/.6 22
- LC Class: PS3618.U233 I58 2006

The Interpretation of Murder, published in 2006, is the first novel by the American law professor Jed Rubenfeld. The book is written in the first person perspective of Dr. Stratham Younger, supposedly an American psychoanalyst. Other events where he is not present he is informed upon so that he has enough knowledge to write and comment on them.
