= The Madwoman in the Volvo =

Play by Sandra Tsing Loh

- Original language: English
- Written by: Sandra Tsing Loh
- Genre: Comedy

Premiere
- Date: 2016
- Place: South Coast Repertory

The Madwoman in the Volvo is a 2016 play written by Sandra Tsing Loh, it was adapted from Loh's 2014 book The Madwoman in the Volvo: My Year of Raging Hormones.

Loh adapted The Madwoman in the Volvo into a play for South Coast Repertory Theater.

== Overview ==
A three-character stage adaptation of mid-life madness, all started by an unlikely trip to Burning Man.
