= The Triple Package =

2014 book by Amy Chua and Jed Rubenfeld

- First edition
- Author: Amy Chua; Jed Rubenfeld
- Language: English
- Genre: Non-fiction
- Publication date: 2014
- Publication place: United States

The Triple Package: How Three Unlikely Traits Explain the Rise and Fall of Cultural Groups in America is a book published in 2014 by two professors at Yale Law School, Amy Chua and her husband, Jed Rubenfeld. Amy Chua is also the author of the 2011 international bestseller, Battle Hymn of the Tiger Mother.

According to the preface, the authors find that "certain groups do much better in America than others—as measured by various socioeconomic indicators such as income, occupational status, job prestige, test scores, and so on— [which] is difficult to talk about. In large part this is because the topic feels racially charged." Nevertheless, the book attempts to debunk racial stereotypes by focusing on three "cultural traits" that attribute to success in the United States.

== Background ==
Following Battle Hymn of the Tiger Mother in 2011, Chua wrote this book with her husband Jed Rubenfeld after observing a more prevalent trend of students from specific ethnic groups achieving better academic results than other ethnic groups. For example, a striking demographic pattern that more Mormon students in Yale are emerging than a couple years ago. According to an interview conducted by Harry Kreisler from the Institute of International Studies, UC Berkeley, the authors explained that such phenomena prompted them to "look further into how those groups perform outside of school, and come to a conclusion that for some reasons, those groups have a tendency to experience more upward social mobility than others."

Before its publication, The Triple Package drew attention for its highly controversial assertion that though with tough economy, shrinking opportunity, and rising economic inequality, certain communities are outperforming the national average, experiencing upward mobility and educational attainment at dramatically high rates, and that this success has to do with certain inherent characteristics belonging to these cultural groups. This led critics to note the book was "sure to garner just as much (if not more) controversy as her first book did."

== Thesis ==
The central argument of the book is that various ethnic groups that are "starkly outperforming" the rest in America possess three distinct traits. These virtues are the presence of a superiority complex, the simultaneous existence of a sense of insecurity, and a marked capacity for impulse control.

=== Superiority complex ===
By definition, superiority is "a deeply internalized belief in your group's specialness, exceptionality, or superiority." The authors claim that this element is derived from various sources. First, from a religious perspective, members of the Church of Jesus Christ of Latter-day Saints, referred to by some as “Mormons” are introduced to their people's magnificent history and civilization. Second, from a social viewpoint, Nigerian immigrants belonging to the prestige entrepreneurial Igbo people. Third, a mixture of both: for example, Jews as "chosen people", and "a moral people, a people of law and intellect, a people of survivors."

=== Insecurity ===
The authors define insecurity as a species of discontent – an anxious uncertainty about your worth or place in society, a feeling or worry that you or what you've done or what you have is in some fundamental way not good enough." Immigrants for example are prone to insecurity because of social and financial anxiety, resulting in the sense of being discriminated against; a perception of danger; feelings of inadequacy and angst of losing their established social standing and possession.

=== Impulse control ===
The authors refer to impulse control as "the ability to resist temptation, especially the temptation to give up in the face of hardship or quit instead of persevering at a difficult task." For instance, the culture amongst members of the Church of Jesus Christ of Latter-day Saints celebrates strict self-discipline with their temperance, two-year mission, and abstinence from sexual relations before marriage. Chua compares that with the Marshmallow Experiment, where a child can either enjoy a piece of marshmallow instantly or wait and have twice as much of the treat later. She concludes that delayed gratification is one of the most important elements in the Triple Package.

The authors add that a superiority complex and insecurity are not mutually exclusive. The coexistence of both qualities "lies at the heart of every Triple Package culture", producing a need to be recognized and an "I'll show them" mentality because the superiority a person has is not acknowledged by the society. Namely, immigrants suffer status collapse though moving up the economic ladder. Thus, this circumstance results in anxiety but also "a drive and jaw-dropping accomplishment."

== Methodology ==
The book categorizes the cultural groups regarding their religion, national origin, and ethnic group. By cultural groups, they refer that as members of the group that tend to be united or pass on a certain sense of outlooks and cultural values to their next generations.

During an interview with Harry Kreisler, the authors explained how they collected the data by going through months of Census data, all available economic data, and from personal experience; and at last narrowed down to the eight cultural groups listed as the successful groups in the United States: Chinese, Jewish, Indian, Iranian, Lebanese, Nigerians, Cuban exiles and Mormons.

As both authors belong to one of the above groups and coming from an immigrant family, namely Chua being Chinese and Rubenfeld being Jewish, Chua further claims that "Chinese Americans are three generations behind the Jews" as both Jewish Americans and Chinese Americans share many similar behaviors like being instructed to learn how to play a musical instrument when they were little and encouraged to become a doctor, teacher or a lawyer.

== Reception ==
The book has received polarized reviews from critics and public. Since Chua has been seen as a provocative figure who sparked a tense debate about parenting with Battle Hymn, this book certainly attracted much attention with its racially charged arguments. Alicia W. Stewart, writing for CNN, claims that "it's no surprise that her latest book about success and cultural groups was given a bit of side-eye, even before it published."

Some critics admired the book for "meticulously document[ing]" how some groups are more high-achieving. but others described it as an exercise in "pop sociology". The Independent (UK) gave a mixed review, concluding that "the book is not racist; it is well written and seductive. But its premise is flawed, arguments pernicious and methods disingenuous. And there is a whiff of aromatic complacency on every page."

In general, positive reviews praised the book for tackling a controversial and complicated socioeconomic and cultural question and for creating a unified theory of success in America, while negative reviews criticized it for ignoring intergenerational wealth transmission as well as selection effects due to the subset of people from different regions who are able to emigrate.

=== Positive reviews ===
Publishers Weekly reviewed the book, concluding: "This comprehensive, lucid sociological study balances its findings with a probing look at the downsides of the triple package—the burden of carrying a family's expectations, and deep insecurities that come at a psychological price."

The Guardian commended the book for "draw[ing] on eye-opening studies of the influence of stereotypes and expectations on various ethnic and cultural groups ... The authors' willingness to pursue an intellectual inquiry that others wouldn't is bracing."

The Kirkus Reviews review of the book concluded: "On a highly touchy subject, the authors tread carefully, backing their assertions with copious notes. Though coolly and cogently argued, this book is bound to be the spark for many potentially heated discussions."

Allison Pearson reviewed the book favorably for The Telegraph, calling it "Powerful, passionate and very entertaining."

Logan Beirne, published an article titled "What George Washington teaches us about success" in Fox News Opinion, that this book is "filled with surprising statistics and sociological research […] Triple Package contends that success is driven not by inborn biology, but is instead propelled by qualities that can be cultivated by all Americans. The book serves as an opportunity to discuss what has helped drive America's triumphs in the past – and how we might harness this knowledge for our future."

JD Vance, writing in the National Review Online, described the book as "sometimes funny, sometimes academic, and always interesting study of the cultural traits that make some groups outperform others in America. . . . [The Triple Package] asks a very important question: why are some of us doing so much better (or worse) than others? . . . I'm not sure that Chua and Rubenfeld have all the right answers. But I do know that by focusing on people—and the cultures that support and affect them—they're asking the right questions. That's more than I can say for most of the social policy experts occupying the airwaves today."

Lucy Kellaway, writing for Financial Times, called it "the best universal theory of success I've seen."

=== Negative reviews ===
Jennifer Lee, a sociologist and a professor at the University of California, Irvine, whose work has been quoted in The Triple Package, criticized the book in the online publication Zócalo Public Square. In her article, she asserts that Chua and Rubenfeld overlooked institutional and structural factors and asks "But what happens if you measure success not just by where people end up—the cars in their garages, the degrees on their walls—but by taking into account where they started?" Lee concludes that after controlling for parental accomplishment and education levels, people of Mexican origin are more successful in the U.S. than people of Chinese origin.

Colin Woodard wrote a critical review of the book for the Washington Post, saying that the thesis of the book was constructed on "methodological quicksand" that was revealed by the case of the people of Appalachia. Also, he shares the same concern most critics have with this book, questioning "might the successes of the exiles have more to do with their relative class, education and social advantages than the Triple Package?", concluding that while people are told an A-minus is a bad grade in Battle Hymn, "one wonders what Chua and Rubenfeld will make of an F."

Maureen Callahan wrote an article titled "Tiger Mom: Some cultural groups are superior" for New York Post, generated heated debate in the public with its incendiary topic, calling the book "a series of shock-arguments wrapped in self-help tropes, and it's meant to do what racist arguments do: scare people." She claims that Chua repeated the same argument from her previous book, Battle Hymn, the rise and ultimate supremacy of China – and this time, "so well timed to deep economic anxiety, to the collective fear that the American middle class is about to disappear, for good."

Alicia Stewart who wrote for CNN sums up several controversial issues in the book: namely, the definition of success is not universal; the traits of success are not a pattern; Triple package cultures highlight relatively less successful cultural groups; overgeneralizing and honing in on groups promote a 'new racism'; the notion of the American dream is undermined.

Khanh Ho was highly critical of the book in an article for the Huffington Post, concluding:

I do have this question: If you arrive in the United States as part of the 1 percent that drained off all the resources from a latter-day colony is it any surprise that you were able to leverage your fortune into a career at a top-notch university? If you inherited your status, wealth, privilege, connections and all it got you was a well-paying job does it at all reflect your innate superiority? Or is your so-called success simply the logical conclusion to the fact that you simply started off better?

John Crace wrote a satirical review-cum-summary of the book for The Guardian, citing one of the Triple Package Traits – Impulse control is to "resist this book."

The book was also negatively reviewed in Boston Globe, saying that "if the book [did not] structured to focus on an underdeveloped notion that feels intentionally provocative, it would have been a lot better."

Jaya Sundaresh, writing for The Aerogram, claims that the authors by singling out eight cultural groups that they claim are "exceptional", "leading us to wonder what is so wrong with other groups in America," suggesting that "this kind of analysis smacks of cultural essentialism."

Writing in Slate Magazine, Daria Roithmayr asserted that the book's argument "doesn't hold water" for several reasons, including avoidance of "the pesky issue of race", not adequately acknowledging "first-wave advantage", and noting that the authors "are forced now to slice and dice the argument" in order to explain away exceptions.

=== Public reception ===
Before the book's publication, New York Post published an article titled "Tiger Mom: Some cultural groups are superior" which sparked controversy, including people using social media to voice their concerns. For example, David Leonard, a historian, tweeted "Dear Amy Chua & Jed Rubenfeld, the 1920s called and want their (racial) theories back." Matt O'Brien tweeted "The Return of the Troll"; and Ellen Wu tweeted "cringe worthy and racist."

=== Authors' response ===
Israeli newspaper Haaretz published an article based on an interview of the authors about the book. An audio interview of the authors was published by Slate Magazine. Amy Chua was also interviewed in The Irish Times, where she emphasized that the book is "about the rise and fall of cultural groups." The article notes that in spite of the success of Asian-American students, they have the lowest reported self-esteem. Chua stresses that the thesis of the book is "intended to be a nuanced idea, not some superficial celebration. It can be very painful to be driven."
