= Daria Roithmayr =

American law professor

External videos
- Book Discussion on Reproducing Racism, C-SPAN, April 20, 2015

Daria Roithmayr is the Provost Professor of Law at the University of Colorado Boulder Law School. She is a nationally and internationally renowned scholar on the dynamics of persistent structural racism.

== Education ==
Roithmayr graduated from University of California, Los Angeles, and from the Georgetown University Law Center, magna cum laude. She clerked for Judge Marvin J. Garbis, of the U.S. District Court for the District of Maryland.

== Career ==
Roithmayr joined the faculty at CU Boulder's Law School in the fall of 2023. Prior to that, she taught for seventeen years at the University of Southern California Gould School of Law and before that, for nine years at the University of Illinois College of Law. She has been a visiting professor at the University of Michigan, University of Chicago, Georgetown, and Yale. She has also been a guest researcher at Harvard's Program for Evolutionary Dynamics. Her book, Reproducing Racism: How Everyday Choices Lock In White Advantage was published by New York University Press in 2014. That book argues that racial inequality is perpetuated through a self-reinforcing monopoly of white advantage that is reproduced over time, even without intentional discrimination.

== Selected writings ==
- Racism Pays: How Racial Exploitation Gets Innovation Off the Ground, 28 Mich. J. Race & Law 145 (2023)
- Reproducing Racism: How Everyday Choices Lock In White Advantage. NYU Press. 20 January 2014. ISBN 978-0-8147-7713-8.
- Barriers to Entry: A Market Lock-In Model of Discrimination, 86 Virginia Law Review 727-799 (2000)
