= Political Tribes =

Overview of nonfiction book

Political Tribes: Group Instinct and the Fate of Nations
- First edition
- Author: Amy Chua
- Language: English
- Genre: Non-fiction
- Publisher: Penguin Random House
- Publication date: February 2018
- Publication place: United States

Political Tribes: Group Instinct and the Fate of Nations is a book by American legal scholar Amy Chua. It was published in February, 2018, and covers the topic of how loyalty to groups can be more important than ideology, and applies this idea to both failures of American foreign policy abroad and the rise of Donald Trump within the United States.

== Reception ==
The book was criticised by The Guardian, which stated that it was "a well-intentioned book that never quite comes together. The Financial Times stated that it was an important book, and supported Chua's argument "that America's liberal elite has contributed to Trump's rise by failing to acknowledge its own sense of tribalism"; it did, however, also state that it left the "crucial question" of how to create a "non-tribal world" unanswered.

The book was praised by JD Vance, who is a former student of Chua and author of Hillbilly Elegy, said that "Political Tribes is a beautifully written, eminently readable, and uniquely important challenge to conventional wisdom."
