= Day of Empire =

2007 book by Amy Chua

Day of Empire: How Hyperpowers Rise to Global Dominance - and Why They Fall
- Hardcover cover
- Author: Amy Chua
- Language: English
- Subject: Imperialism, colonialism, geopolitics
- Genre: Political science, history, international relations
- Publisher: Doubleday
- Publication date: October 2007
- Publication place: United States
- Media type: eBook, hardcover
- Pages: 432
- ISBN: 978-0-385-52412-4 (eBook); 978-0-385-51284-8 (hardcover)

Day of Empire: How Hyperpowers Rise to Global Dominance - and Why They Fall is a 2007 book by Yale Law School professor Amy Chua.

== Summary ==
The book discusses examples of "hyperpowers" throughout human history. It explains their strength as a result of their tolerance towards ethnic and religious diversity, but also explains how this diversity eventually led to their downfall.
