= Dominant minority =

Minority group that holds a disproportionate amount of power

A dominant minority, also called elite dominance, is a minority group that has overwhelming political, economic, or cultural dominance in a country, despite representing a small fraction of the overall population (a demographic minority). The term is most commonly used to refer to an ethnic group that is defined along racial, national, religious, cultural or tribal lines and that holds a disproportionate amount of power and wealth compared to the rest of the population.

In contrast, minority rule, of less permanency and with no basis in race or ethnicity, is often seen when a political party holds a majority in political structures and decisions, but receiving less than the majority of votes in an election. At the district level, Election by plurality as opposed to majority is common in self described democracies despite this type of minority rule thereby being frequently produced in the legislative chamber.

== Africa ==
Several instances of dominant ethnic minorities exist or did exist in Africa.

In South Africa during the apartheid regime, where white South Africans, more specifically Afrikaners, wielded predominant control of the country, despite never composing more than 22 percent of the population.

African-American-descended nationals in Liberia, white Zimbabweans in Rhodesia, Christians in Sierra Leone, and the Tutsi in Rwanda since the 1990s also have been cited as current or recent examples.

== North America ==
From the invasion of New France in the 1760s and the formation of Canada in 1867 until the Quiet Revolution of the 1960s, the economy of Quebec was greatly dependent on the English speaking minority in Quebec, who comprised roughly 7.5-15% of the provincial population (heavily centred in Montreal and comprising a majority of the population of Montreal between the 19th and early to mid 20th century) throughout Quebec's post–Royal French Canadian history, despite the Francophone Québécois' comprising more than 80% of the province's population.

== See also ==
- Colonialism
  - Exploitation colonialism
  - Plantation colonies
  - Settler colonialism
- Elitism
- Herrenvolk democracy
- Middleman minority
- Minoritarianism
- Minority influence
- Model minority
- Neocolonialism
- Tyranny of the majority
- World on Fire, a book that introduces the concept of "market-dominant minority"
- Global majority
