= Amy Chua =

American law professor and writer (born 1962)

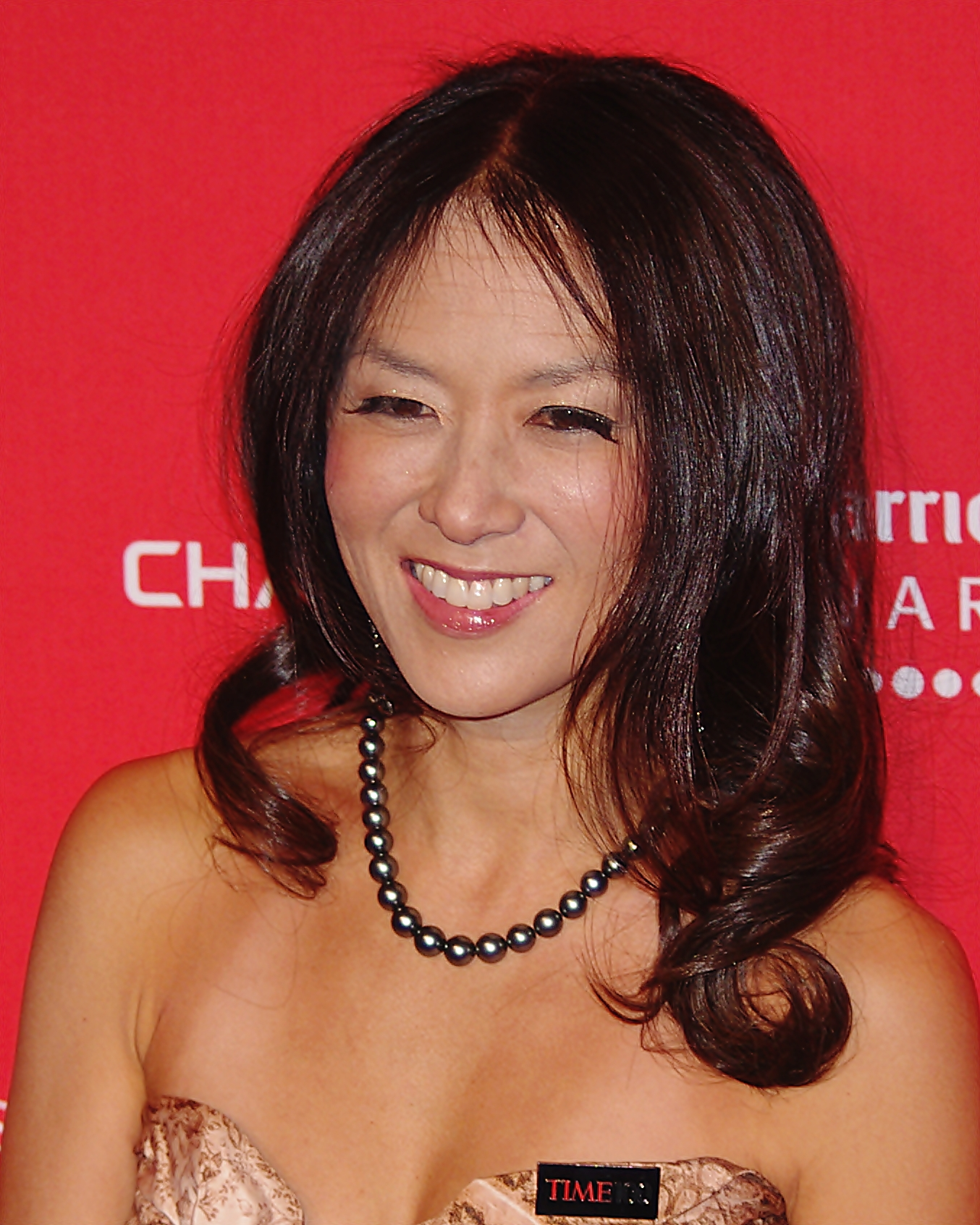
- Chua in 2012
- Born: Amy Lynn Chua; October 26, 1962 (age 64); Champaign, Illinois, U.S.
- Education: Harvard University (BA, JD)
- Occupations: Corporate lawyer; legal scholar; writer
- Spouse: Jed Rubenfeld
- Children: Two
- Writing career
- Subjects: Economics, international relations, law, parenting, political science, sociology
- Notable works: World on Fire (2003); Battle Hymn of the Tiger Mother (2011); Political Tribes (2018)

Chinese name
- Traditional Chinese: 蔡美兒
- Simplified Chinese: 蔡美儿
Transcriptions
Standard Mandarin
- Hanyu Pinyin: Cài Měi'ér
Southern Min
- Hokkien POJ: Chhòa Bí-jî
- Tâi-lô: Tshuà Bí-jî
- Website: amychua.com

Amy Lynn Chua (born October 26, 1962) is an American legal scholar, corporate lawyer, and writer. She is the John M. Duff Jr. Professor of Law at Yale Law School with an expertise in international business transactions, law and development, ethnic conflict, and globalization. She joined the Yale faculty in 2001 after teaching at Duke Law School for seven years. Prior to teaching, she was a corporate law associate at Cleary, Gottlieb, Steen & Hamilton.

Chua is also known for her parenting memoir Battle Hymn of the Tiger Mother. In 2011, she was named one of Time magazine's 100 most influential people, one of The Atlantic's Brave Thinkers, and one of Foreign Policy's Global Thinkers.

== Early life and education ==
Chua was born in Champaign, Illinois, to ethnic Chinese parents with Hoklo ancestry who emigrated from the Philippines. Her parents raised her speaking Hokkien. Her father, Leon O. Chua, is a professor of electrical engineering and computer science at the University of California, Berkeley. His ancestral hometown is Quanzhou, Fujian.

Chua's mother was born in China in 1936, before moving to the Philippines at the age of two. She subsequently converted to Catholicism in high school and graduated from the University of Santo Tomas, with a degree in chemical engineering, summa cum laude.

Chua was raised Catholic and lived in West Lafayette, Indiana. When she was 8 years old, her family moved to Berkeley, California.

Chua described herself as an "ugly kid" during her school days; she was bullied in school for her foreign accent (which she has since lost) and was the target of racial slurs from several classmates. She went to El Cerrito High School, in El Cerrito, where she graduated as valedictorian of her class. In college, she graduated Phi Beta Kappa and magna cum laude with a Bachelor of Arts in economics in 1984 from Harvard College, where she was named an Elizabeth Cary Agassiz Scholar and a John Harvard Scholar. She obtained her J.D., cum laude, in 1987 from Harvard Law School. As a law student, she became the first Asian American officer of the Harvard Law Review after becoming the journal's executive editor.

After law school, Chua clerked for Chief Judge Patricia M. Wald of the United States Court of Appeals for the D.C. Circuit.

== Books ==
Her first book, World on Fire: How Exporting Free Market Democracy Breeds Ethnic Hatred and Global Instability (2003), explores the ethnic conflict caused in many societies by disproportionate economic and political influence of "market dominant minorities" and the resulting resentment in the less affluent majority. World on Fire, which was a New York Times bestseller, selected by The Economist as one of the Best Books of 2003, and named by Tony Giddens in The Guardian as one of the "Top Political Reads of 2003", examines how globalization and democratization since 1989 have affected the relationship between market-dominant minorities and the wider population.

Her second book, Day of Empire: How Hyperpowers Rise to Global Dominance – and Why They Fall (2007), examines seven major empires and posits that their success depended on their tolerance of minorities.

Chua's third book, Battle Hymn of the Tiger Mother, published in January 2011, is a memoir about her parenting journey using strict Confucianist child rearing techniques, which she claims is typical for Chinese immigrant parents. Despite being sometimes interpreted as a how-to manual for parenting, the book has been critically viewed as an account "of how children can become rebellious and alienated when one-size-fits-all education philosophies are applied, regardless of their personality or aptitudes." It was an international bestseller in the United States, South Korea, Poland, Israel, Germany, United Kingdom, and China, and has been translated into 30 languages. The book also received a huge backlash and media attention and ignited global debate about different parenting techniques and cultural attitudes that foster such techniques. The uproar provoked by the book included death threats and racial slurs directed at Chua, and calls for her arrest on child-abuse charges.

Her fourth book, co-written with husband Jed Rubenfeld, is The Triple Package: How Three Unlikely Traits Explain the Rise and Fall of Cultural Groups in America (published in February 2014). The book received mixed reviews. Lucy Kellaway, writing for Financial Times, called it "the best universal theory of success I've seen." Emma Brockes, writing in The Guardian, commended the book for "draw[ing] on eye-opening studies of the influence of stereotypes and expectations on various ethnic and cultural groups ... The authors' willingness to pursue an intellectual inquiry that others wouldn't is bracing." However, The Guardian also published a satirical review-cum-summary written by John Crace, who used one of the Triple Package traits—impulse control—to tell potential readers to "resist this book." The book was also roundly criticized for cultural stereotyping and ignoring additional factors such as intergenerational wealth transmission. Forbes writer Susan Adams criticized it for racist overtones and said Chua's suggestion that certain cultural groups are more conventionally successful than others given her "three-pronged prescription [for success]" is at best "pop psychology." An empirical study by Joshua Hart and Christopher Chabris found that "[t]here was little evidence for the Triple Package theory."

In February 2018, Chua's fifth book was published. Titled Political Tribes: Group Instinct and the Fate of Nations, it examines how group loyalty often outweighs any other ideological considerations. She argues that the failure to recognize the place of group loyalty has played a major role in the failure of US foreign policy and the rise of Donald Trump. The book received overwhelmingly positive reviews from across the political spectrum. David Frum, writing for The New York Times, praised Chua for her willingness to approach "the no-go areas around which others usually tiptoe." The Washington Post described the book as "compact, insightful, disquieting, yet ultimately hopeful," and Ezra Klein called the book "fascinating" on his podcast.

The book received a few criticisms. The Guardian called it "a well-intentioned book that never quite comes together." The Financial Times stated that it was "an important book" and supported Chua's argument "that America's liberal elite has contributed to Trump's rise by failing to acknowledge its own sense of tribalism"; it did, however, also state that it left the "crucial question" of how to create a "non-tribal world" unanswered.

== Articles by Chua ==
Chua published the article "Why Chinese Mothers Are Superior" on January 8, 2011, discussing the differences between Western and Asian American parenting styles. For instance, she listed things that her daughters are not allowed to do, such as attend sleepovers, engage in playdates, watch TV, play computer games, get grades below A, or be a part of school plays. Throughout her article, she uses the terms "Western" and "Asian" but says that those are loose terms. She explains that there are parents that are not necessarily Chinese, but still have similar parenting techniques. On the other hand, there are also Chinese parents who grew up in the West and choose not to adopt that style of parenting.

According to a study cited in her article, 70% of Western American mothers believe that pressuring children to excel in academics would prove detrimental, while 0% of Chinese immigrant mothers agreed, with Chinese mothers instead believing it is vital that children strive for academic achievement. Additionally, it was proven in another study that there was a significantly higher number of Western kids in sports than Chinese kids. Giving examples from her childhood, Chua explains a particular belief housed by Chinese immigrant parents—you receive satisfaction only when you have had success. She argues that repetition, tenaciousness, and constant hard work at something will lead to success. Chua also goes on to explain how Western parents have to walk on eggshells on controversial issues like health and weight, while Asian American parents give it straight. Ultimately, Chua describes three different beliefs in her article. First, Western parents are very concerned about their kids' self-esteem and putting things too harshly. Second, Chinese parents think their kids owe them everything and must repay them. Third, Chinese parents think they know the best path for their kids and therefore override any beliefs or wants that they think is not beneficial for success. Chua emphasizes that this does not mean Chinese parents do not care for their kids—in fact, she argues the opposite—that they really, really, care. Chua provides one last example of a piano incident with her daughter, Lulu. Lulu was having trouble learning a piano piece, and wasn't getting it at the same age that her sister had. While Chua kept pushing her daughter, using all the techniques she could muster, her husband, Jed, had a different mindset. That evening was full of tension and yelling, but at one moment, Lulu ended up getting the piano piece, and that filled her with joy. At a future piano recital, Lulu plays the piece and earns praise and credit.

== Yale Law School ==
The courses that Chua taught at Yale Law School include "Contracts" and "International Business Transactions." She was named the John M. Duff Professor at Yale Law. Chua was awarded the "Best Teaching" Award during her time at Yale Law School.

Chua taught JD Vance during his first year at Yale Law. She persuaded him to write his memoir Hillbilly Elegy, which became a New York Times bestseller and a film starring Amy Adams and Glenn Close. Vance credits Chua as the "authorial godmother" of the book.

Chua is known for mentoring students from marginalized communities and for helping students get judicial clerkships. In 2018, HuffPost and The Guardian alleged that Chua had advised female students to dress "outgoing" when seeking employment. Chua denied this claim. In 2019, Chua agreed not to drink or socialize with students outside of class for a limited time. In 2021, Chua was accused of drunkenly partying with students and federal judges. She agreed to a one-year restriction of her teaching duties as a small group professor.

== Personal life ==
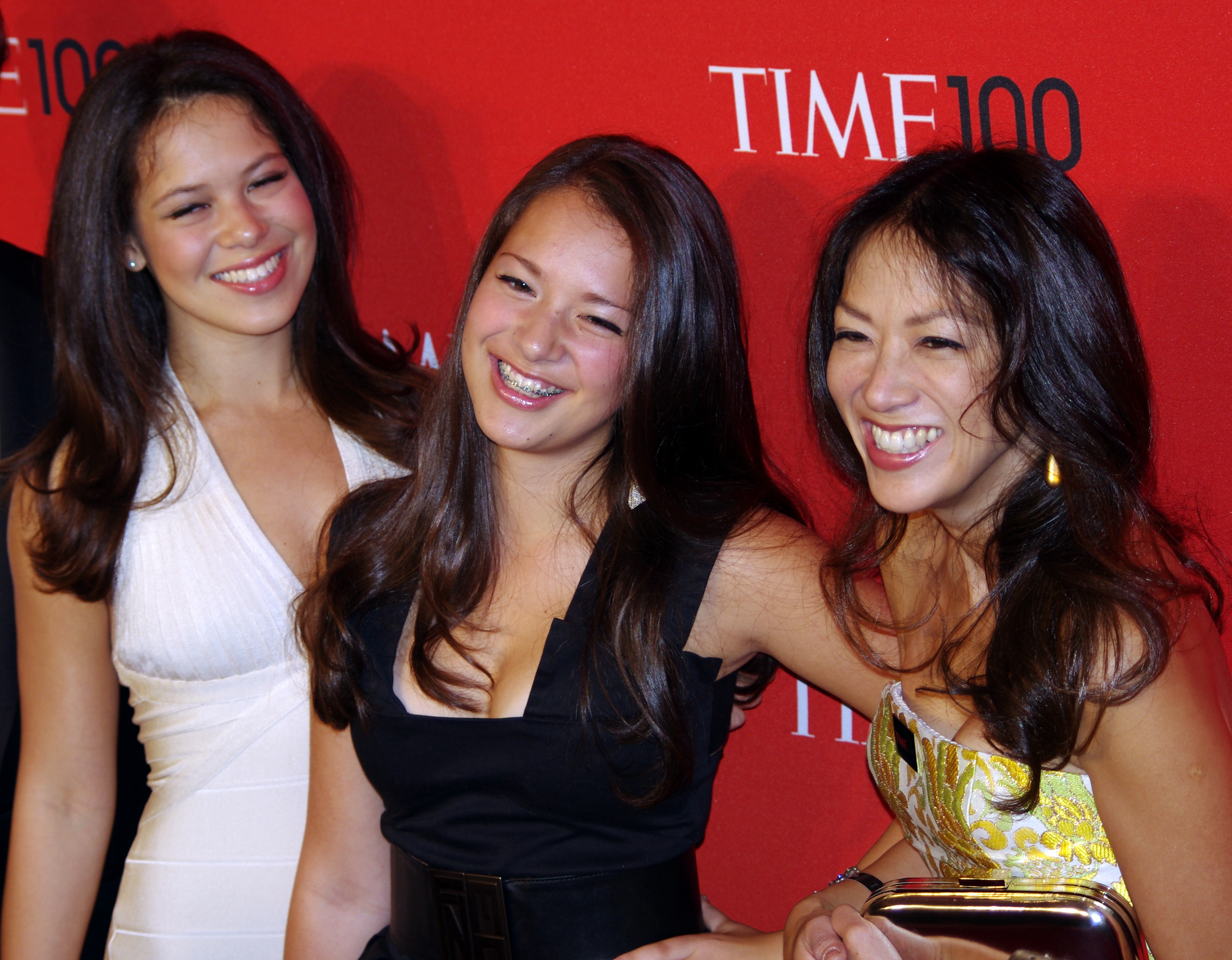
Chua (right) and her daughters at the 2011 Time 100 gala

Chua lives in New Haven, Connecticut, and is married to Yale Law School professor Jed Rubenfeld. The couple has two daughters and a grandson.

Chua's elder daughter, Sophia Chua-Rubenfeld Bravo, is a graduate of Harvard University and Yale Law School. Sophia previously served as a clerk for Judge Britt C. Grant, U.S. Court of Appeals, Eleventh Circuit (2018–2019) and clerk for Supreme Court Justice Brett Kavanaugh (2019–2020). She is currently an attorney based in Atlanta, Georgia.

Chua's youngest daughter, Lulu Chua-Rubenfeld, is a graduate of Harvard University and Harvard Law School. Lulu previously served as a judicial law clerk for Judge Roy K. Altman, U.S. District Court for The Southern District of Florida (2023–2024) and judicial law clerk for Judge Barbara Lagoa, U.S. Court of Appeals (2024–2025).

== Television appearances ==
Chua has made appearances on various TV programs. Some include The Today Show, Good Morning America, The View, Charlie Rose, and Real Time with Bill Maher.

== Bibliography ==
- World On Fire: How Exporting Free Market Democracy Breeds Ethnic Hatred and Global Instability. 2002. Doubleday. ISBN 978-0385512848
- Day of Empire: How Hyperpowers Rise to Global Dominance – and Why They Fall. 2007. Doubleday. ISBN 9780385512848
- Battle Hymn of the Tiger Mother. 2011. Penguin Books. ISBN 978-0143120582
- The Triple Package: How Three Unlikely Traits Explain the Rise and Fall of Cultural Groups in America. 2014. Penguin Books. ISBN 978-1594205460
- Political Tribes: Group Instinct and the Fate of Nations. 2018. Penguin Books. ISBN 978-0399562853
- The Golden Gate (book). 2023.
- Why Chinese Mothers Are Superior. 2011
- Amy Chua - Yale Law School faculty page. 2018
