= World on Fire (book) =

2003 book by Amy Chua

- Cover of the first edition
- Author: Amy Chua
- Language: English
- Subjects: Economic inequality; ethnic conflict; globalization
- Publisher: Doubleday (hardcover); Anchor Books (paperback)
- Publication date: 2003 (hardcover)
- Publication place: United States
- Media type: Print (hardcover and paperback)
- ISBN: 978-0-385-72186-8 (paperback)
- Dewey Decimal: 303.6 21
- LC Class: HF1359 .C524 2004

World on Fire: How Exporting Free Market Democracy Breeds Ethnic Hatred and Global Instability is a 2003 book by American legal scholar Amy Chua. It is an academic study of ethnic and sociological divisions in the economic and political systems of various societies. The book discusses the concept of "market-dominant minorities", which it defines as ethnic minority groups who, under given market conditions, tend to prosper, flourish, and dominate economically, often significantly, over other, often ethnic majority groups in the country.

== Summary ==
The concept of market-dominant minority was introduced by Chua in a 1998 paper Markets, Democracy, and Ethnicity. In the Philippines, Chua notes that the Chinese community comprise one percent of the population but control 60 percent of the private economy, with the result being resentment on the part of the Filipino majority against the Chinese minority creating an ethnic conflict. Similarly, in Indonesia, the Chinese Indonesian community make up three percent of the population, but control 75 percent of the economy. Similarly, in Malaysia, the Chinese Malaysian community make up twenty two percent of the population, but control 75 percent of the economy. Similar patterns occur throughout other Southeast Asian economies.

Chua gives examples of the concept that she calls ethnic "market-dominant minorities" such as the Overseas Chinese in Southeast Asia; European diasporas throughout Latin America and Africa; Israeli Jews in Israel and the Middle East; Russian Jewish Oligarchs in post-Communist Russia; Croats in the former Yugoslavia; Overseas Indians in East Africa, Overseas Lebanese in West Africa and Mexico, and the Yoruba, Igbos, Kikuyus, Tutsis in Nigeria, Kenya, and Rwanda.

In the book, Chua discusses different reasons for the market dominance of different groups. Some groups inherited market dominance because of colonial legacies and apartheid. In other cases, it may be due to the culture and family networks of these groups. For many groups there is no clear single explanation.

Americans and the United States can also be seen as a global market-dominant minority, in particular when combined with their use of cultural soft power, military strength, economic might, and flaunting political hegemony, thereby causing resentment throughout the world.

Chua believes that democratisation can increase ethnic conflicts when an ethnic minority is disproportionately wealthy, arguing that "When free market democracy is pursued in the presence of a market-dominant minority, the almost invariable result is backlash. This backlash typically takes one of three forms. The first is a backlash against markets, targeting the market-dominant minority's wealth. The second is a backlash against democracy by forces favorable to the market-dominant minority. The third is violence, sometimes genocidal, directed against the market-dominant minority itself." Also, "overnight democracy will empower the poor, indigenous majority. What happens is that under those circumstances, democracy doesn't do what we expect it to do – that is, reinforce markets. [Instead,] democracy leads to the emergence of manipulative politicians and demagogues who find that the best way to get votes is by scapegoating the minorities." She writes, "Ballot boxes brought Hitler to power in Germany, Mugabe to power in Zimbabwe, Milosevic to power in Serbia — and could well bring the likes of Osama bin Laden to power in Saudi Arabia."

Chua states that she is a "big fan of trying to promote markets and democracy globally," but that it should be accompanied by attempts to "redistribute the wealth, whether it's property title and giving poor people property, land reform ... Redistributive mechanisms are tough to have if you have so much corruption."

== Reception ==
Andreas Wimmer and Brian Min, criticizing the book, state:

By contrast, our analysis shows that what has been observed in recent decades may simply be more of the same old story. Although history never repeats itself, the same process patterns may be operating at different times and in different historical contexts (cf. Collier and Mazzuca 2006). The dismemberment of empire and the formation of the nation-state have led to wars since the time of Napoleon. The patterns of warfare in the Caucasus and the Balkans in the 1990s resemble those on the Indian sub-continent in the 1940s, those of Eastern Europe during and after World War I, and so on. The return of the "Macedonian syndrome," as Myron Weiner (1971) has called the intermingling of ethnic conflict and irredentist wars, explains such recurrent patterns of war much better than any variant of globalization theory. To treat them as a fundamentally new phenomenon, brought about by the end of the Cold War or increased globalization, represents yet another example of the widespread tendency among social scientists to perceive their own times as unique and exceptionally dynamic (on "chrono- centrism," see Fowles 1974).

They also note that several studies support a variant of the democratic peace theory, which argues that more democracy causes a general decrease in systematic violence, at least for the most democratic nations. However, intermediately democratic nations do have a higher tendency for conflicts such as civil war than autocracies.

International law scholar Tom Ginsburg states: "the wide appeal of Chua's argument does not mean that she is correct. When one looks at the trees rather than the forest, many of the phenomena tied together by her theory do not in fact belong there... The book lacks the methodological rigor that must ultimately support any compelling conclusion about the complex relationships between democracy, development and ethnicity."

== Accolades ==
World on Fire was selected as one of The Economist's "Best Books of the Year 2003".

== See also ==
- Dominant minority
- Minoritarianism
- Model minority
- Middleman minority
