= An Lão, Haiphong =

An Lão Xã An Lão
- Commune
- An Lão commune
- Location within Vietnam
- Coordinates: 20°49′18″N 106°33′23″E
- Country: Vietnam
- Region: Red River Delta
- Municipality: Haiphong
- Time zone: UTC+7 (UTC + 7)

An Lão is a commune (xã) of Haiphong, Vietnam.
