= List of Taiwanese Americans =

This is a list of notable Taiwanese Americans, including both original immigrants who obtained American citizenship and their American descendants.

To be included in this list, the person must have a Wikipedia article showing they are Taiwanese American or must have references showing they are Taiwanese American and are notable.

== List ==
=== Art and design ===
- Malan Breton, fashion designer
- Wenlan Chia, fashion designer
- Doug Chiang, movie designer and artist
- Han Hsiang-ning, artist
- Jack Hsu, storyboard artist, animator, graphic novelist
- James Jean, artist
- Jen Kao, fashion designer
- Yu Tsai, photographer and America's Next Top Model creative consultant
- Alexander Wang, fashion designer
- Jason Wu, fashion designer
- Luly Yang, fashion designer
- Nymphia Wind, winner of RuPaul's Drag Race season 16 and fashion designer

=== Business ===
- Fred Chang, founder of Newegg
- Morris Chang, founder of Taiwan Semiconductor Manufacturing Company
- Sam Chang, New York hotel developer
- Wayne Chang, founder of Crashlytics, entrepreneur, angel investor, film producer, and philanthropist
- Albert Chao, CEO and co-founder of Westlake Chemical
- Allen Chao, founder of Watson Pharmaceuticals
- Eva Chen, co-founder and CEO of Trend Micro
- Pehong Chen, founder of Gain Technology and Broadvision
- Steve Chen, founder and CEO of Galactic Computing
- Steve Chen, co-founder of YouTube
- Chen Wen-Chi, president and CEO of VIA Technologies, husband to HTC co-founder Cher Wang
- Albert Cheng, Interim President of Amazon Studios
- Andrew Cherng, founder of Chinese fast food restaurant chain Panda Express
- Ben Chiu, founder of KillerApp.com acquired by CNET
- Yu-kai Chou, gamification expert, entrepreneur and developer of Octalysis
- David Chu, co-founder of Nautica, clothing company
- James Chu, founder, CEO and chairman of ViewSonic
- John Chuang, co-founder and CEO of Aquent
- Victor Ho, co-founder and CEO of FiveStars
- Tony Hsieh, CEO of Zappos.com, online shoe store
- Jameson Hsu, co-founder and CEO of Mochi Media
- Jensen Huang, CEO and co-founder of Nvidia
- Min H. Kao, co-founder of Garmin, billionaire
- Kai-Fu Lee, President of Google China
- Alfred Lin, venture capitalist at Sequoia Capital
- Dan Lin, Hollywood film producer and former Senior Vice President at Warner Bros. Pictures
- Ivan Linn, CEO and founder of Folks
- Teresa H. Meng, co-founder of Qualcomm Atheros
- Ellen Pao, lawyer and former chief executive officer of Reddit.
- Danny Pang, private equity manager, accused of running a Ponzi scheme
- Will Shu, co-founder and CEO of Deliveroo
- Debby Soo, CEO of OpenTable
- Lisa Su, CEO and president of Advanced Micro Devices
- David Sun, co-founder of Kingston Technologies, billionaire
- Janie Tsao, co-founder of Linksys
- Victor Tsao, co-founder of Linksys
- Greg Tseng, co-founder and CEO of Tagged
- John Tu, Taiwanese American co-founder of Kingston Technologies, billionaire
- Tien Tzuo, co-founder and CEO of Zuora
- William Wang, co-founder and CEO of Vizio
- Jerry Yang, co-founder of Yahoo!, billionaire
- Bing Yeh, founder of Silicon Storage Technology and Greenliant Systems

=== Entertainment ===
- Lilan Bowden – actress
- Christina Chang – actress
- Louis Ozawa Changchien – actor; 1/2 Taiwanese
- Arvin Chen – film director and screenwriter
- Ian Chen – actor
- Lynn Chen – actress
- Jay Chern – film director and screenwriter
- Rosalie Chiang - actress, writer
- Tim Chiou – actor
- Jon M. Chu – film director
- Roger Fan – actor
- Ted Fu – founding member of Wong Fu Productions
- Peter Ho – actor
- Janet Hsieh – model and television personality
- Stephanie Hsu – actress
- George Hu – actor
- Eddie Huang – chef, television producer and presenter
- Tina Huang – actress
- Elaine Kao – actress
- Christine Ko – actress
- Michelle Krusiec – actress
- Katrina Law – actress; 1/2 Taiwanese
- Megan Lawless – actress
- Georgia Lee – film director and screenwriter
- Erin Li – film director and screenwriter
- James Hiroyuki Liao – actor
- Annie Lin – musician and attorney
- Dan Lin – film and TV producer
- Justin Lin – film director
- Kelly Lin – actress and model
- Stephanie Lin – television journalist and beauty queen
- Wayne Lin - violinist
- Dyana Liu – actress
- Lucy Liu – actress
- Andy On – actor
- Bertha Bay-Sa Pan – film director, screenwriter and producer
- Will Pan – singer-songwriter
- Ivan Shaw – actor
- Fang-Yi Sheu – modern dancer
- Will Tiao – actor and producer
- Albert Tsai – actor
- Jessika Van – actress and singer
- Garrett Wang – actor
- Wang Leehom – singer-songwriter and actor
- Anya Wu – actress and singer
- Constance Wu – actress
- Kevin Wu – YouTuber and actor
- Camille Chen – actress and director
- Hsu Wei-ning - actress
- Raymond Wu – professional poker player
- Vanness Wu – singer and actor
- Alan Yang – producer, screenwriter and director
- Hudson Yang – actor
- Jenny Yang – comedian
- Welly Yang – actor, writer and singer
- Kelvin Yu – actor and writer

=== Journalism ===
- Ailsa Chang, journalist and news host for National Public Radio
- Emily Chang, journalist and anchor; host of Bloomberg TV's Bloomberg Technology
- Iris Chang, journalist, author of The Rape of Nanking and other books of Chinese history
- Jeff Chang, journalist, hip-hop historian
- Laura Chang, science editor, The New York Times
- Christine Chen, journalist and anchor
- Connie Chung, journalist and anchor; second woman ever to anchor a national news program
- Patty Hou, former news and fashion anchor, current entertainment anchor in Taiwan
- Laura Ling, journalist (mother was Taiwanese; sister of Lisa Ling)
- Lisa Ling, journalist (mother was Taiwanese; sister of Laura Ling)
- Henry Liu, aka Chiang Nan, writer and journalist
- Kristie Lu Stout, journalist and news anchor for CNN International
- Jeff Yang, journalist, author and father of actor Hudson Yang
- Anthony Yuen, print and broadcast journalist

=== Literature ===
- Lan Samantha Chang, fiction writer; director of the Iowa Writer's Workshop
- Ted Chiang, fiction writer, author of Story of Your Life
- Jennifer Chow, novelist, fiction writer, author of The 228 Legacy
- Frankie Gaw, cookbook writer
- Vanessa Hua, journalist, writer, author of Deceit and Other Possibilities
- Eddie Huang, author of the memoirs Fresh Off the Boat: A Memoir (the basis for the TV show of the same name) and Double Cup Love: On the Trail of Family, Food, and Broken Hearts in China.
- Ed Lin, novelist, fiction writer, author of This Is A Bust
- Francie Lin, novelist, fiction writer, author of The Foreigner
- Grace Lin, children's book writer and illustrator
- Tao Lin, fiction writer
- Eric Liu, writer, speechwriter for Bill Clinton
- Henry Liu, aka Chiang Nan, writer and journalist
- Shawna Yang Ryan, novelist, fiction writer, author of Green Island and Water Ghosts
- Esmé Weijun Wang, writer, author of The Collected Schizophrenias
- Julie Wu, novelist, fiction writer, author of The Third Son
- Charles Yu, novelist, fiction writer

=== Music ===
- Jason Chen, singer
- Robert Chen, violinist, Concertmaster of Chicago Symphony Orchestra
- Andrew Chou, member of hip-hop group Machi based in Taiwan
- Peter Ho, singer
- Evonne Hsu, pop singer based in Taiwan
- Stanley Huang, singer based in Taiwan
- Miss Ko, singer-songwriter and rapper
- Gary Kuo, violinist and composer
- Chihchun Chi-sun Lee, composer
- Cho-Liang Lin, violinist
- Joseph Lin, first violinist for Juilliard String Quartet
- Richard Lin, violinist
- Amber Josephine Liu, singer and rapper from South Korean girl group f(x)
- Jerry Lo, singer-songwriter based in Taiwan
- Allen Ma, rapper from South Korean boy group Cravity
- Anthony Neely, singer
- Will Pan, pop singer based in Taiwan
- Fan-Wei Qi, pop singer based in Taiwan
- David Tao, singer-songwriter
- Vienna Teng, singer-songwriter
- Mark Tuan, rapper of South Korean boy group GOT7
- Lara Veronin, vocalist of Taiwanese group Nan Quan Ma Ma
- Dawen Wang, singer-songwriter
- Joanna Wang, singer-songwriter
- Leehom Wang, singer-songwriter based in Taiwan
- Vanness Wu, member of boyband F4 based in Taiwan
- Sophia Yan, pianist
- Cindy Yen, singer-songwriter
- Charlie Yin, producer-performer known as Giraffage

=== Politics, law and government ===
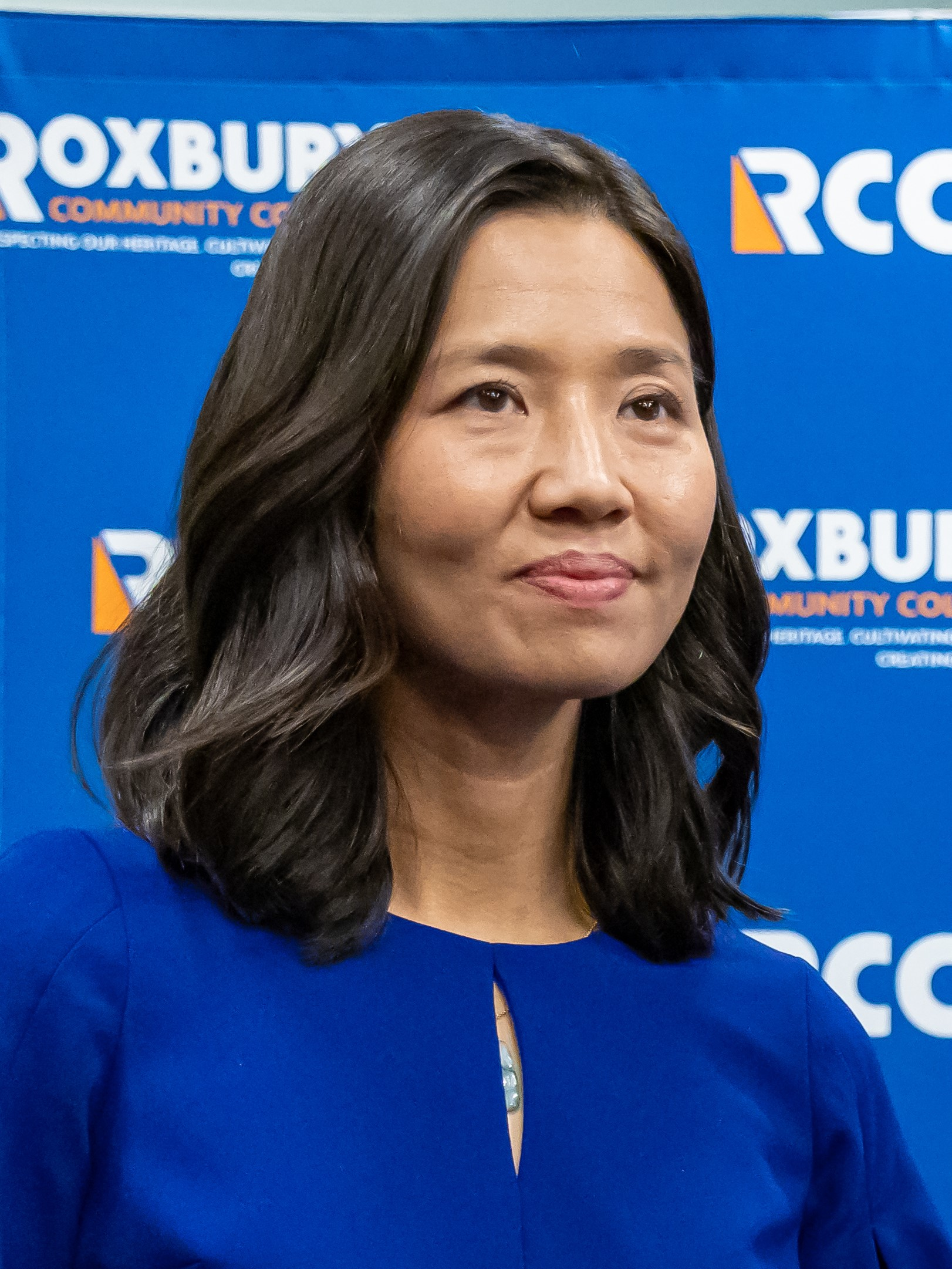
Michelle Wu
吳弭

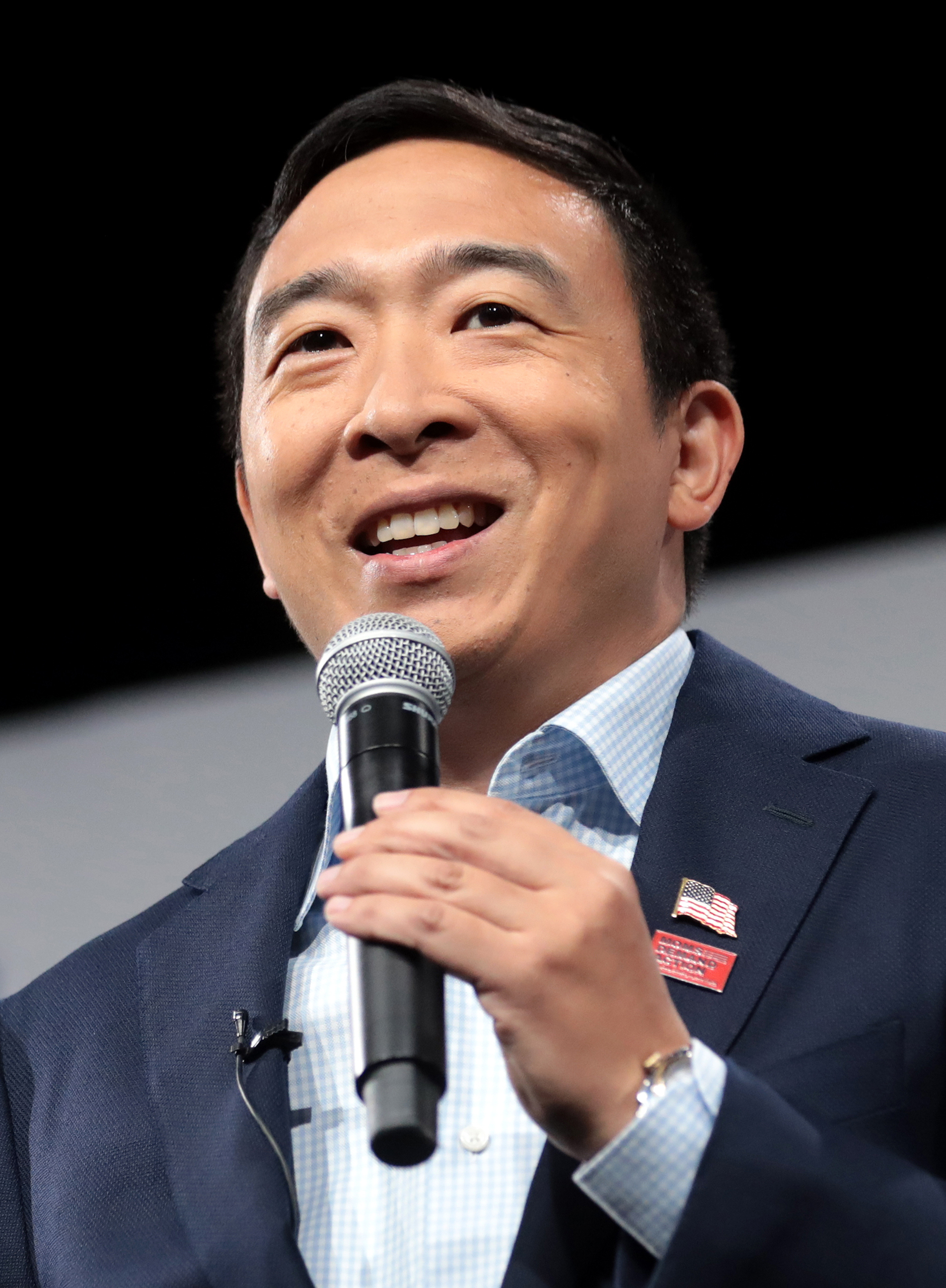
Andrew Yang
楊安澤

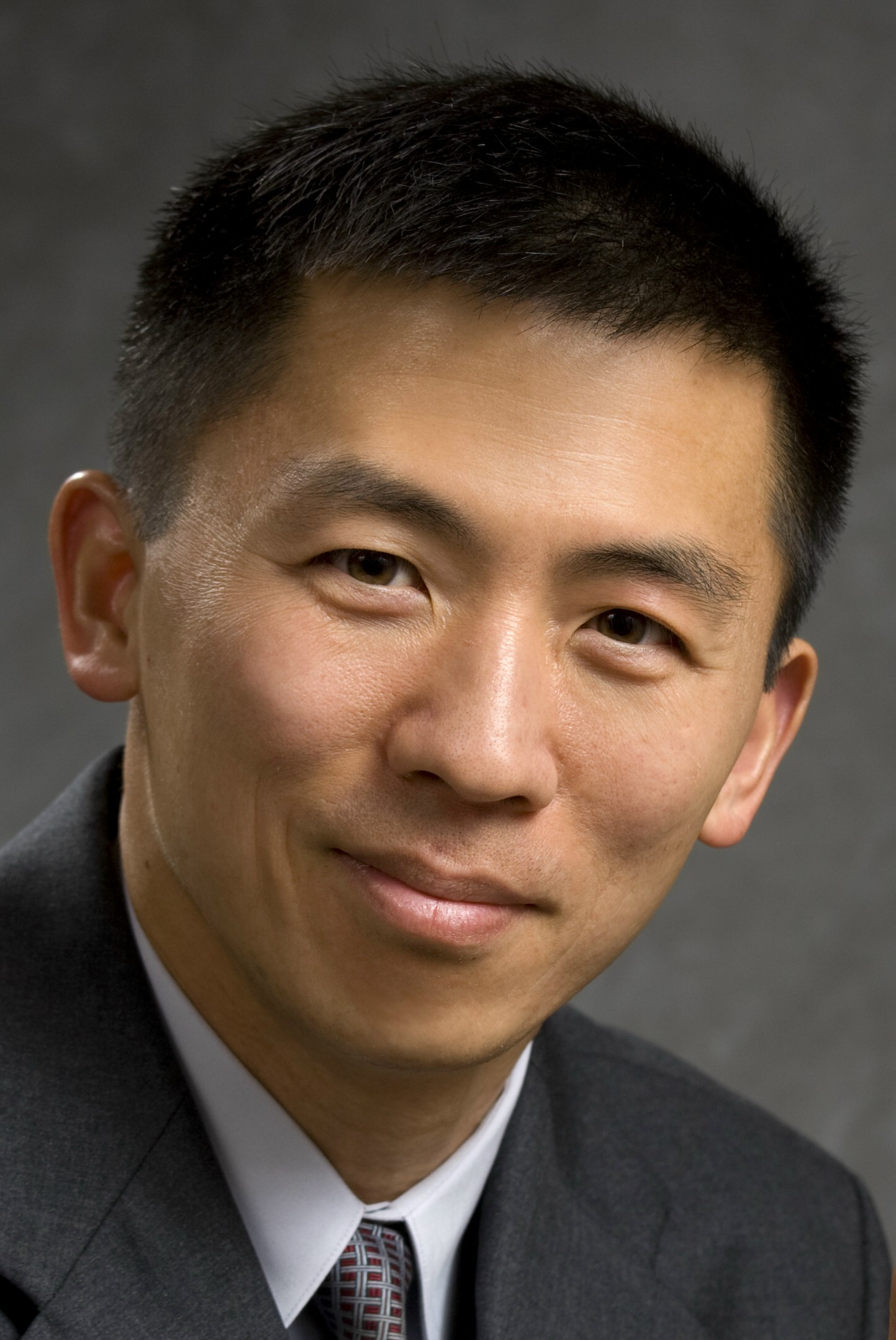
Goodwin Liu
劉弘威

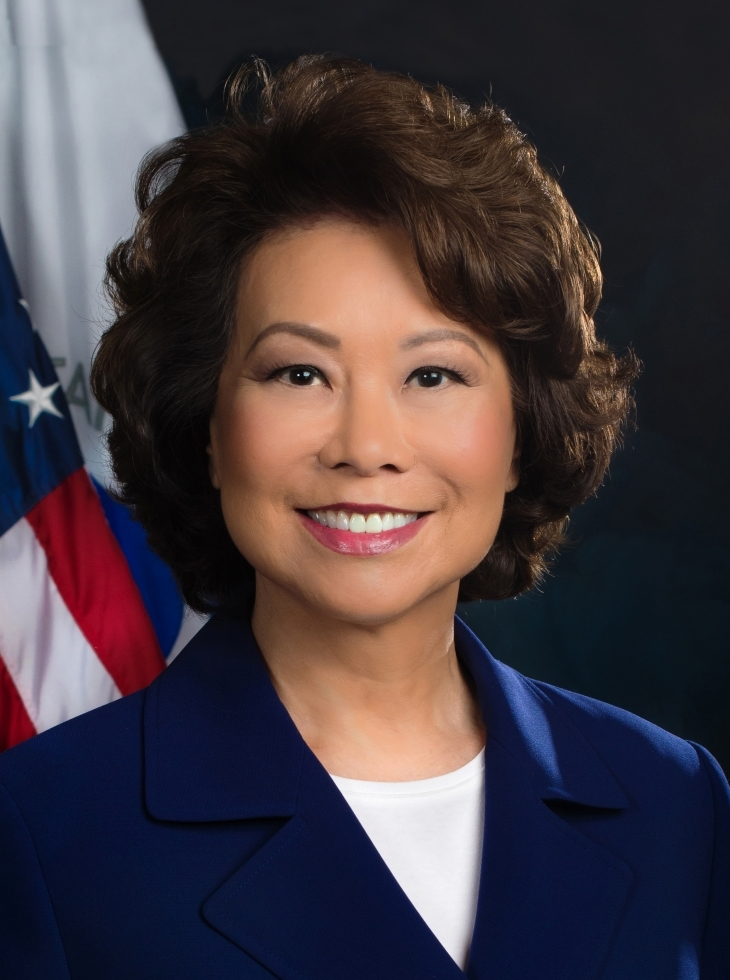
Elaine Chao
趙小蘭

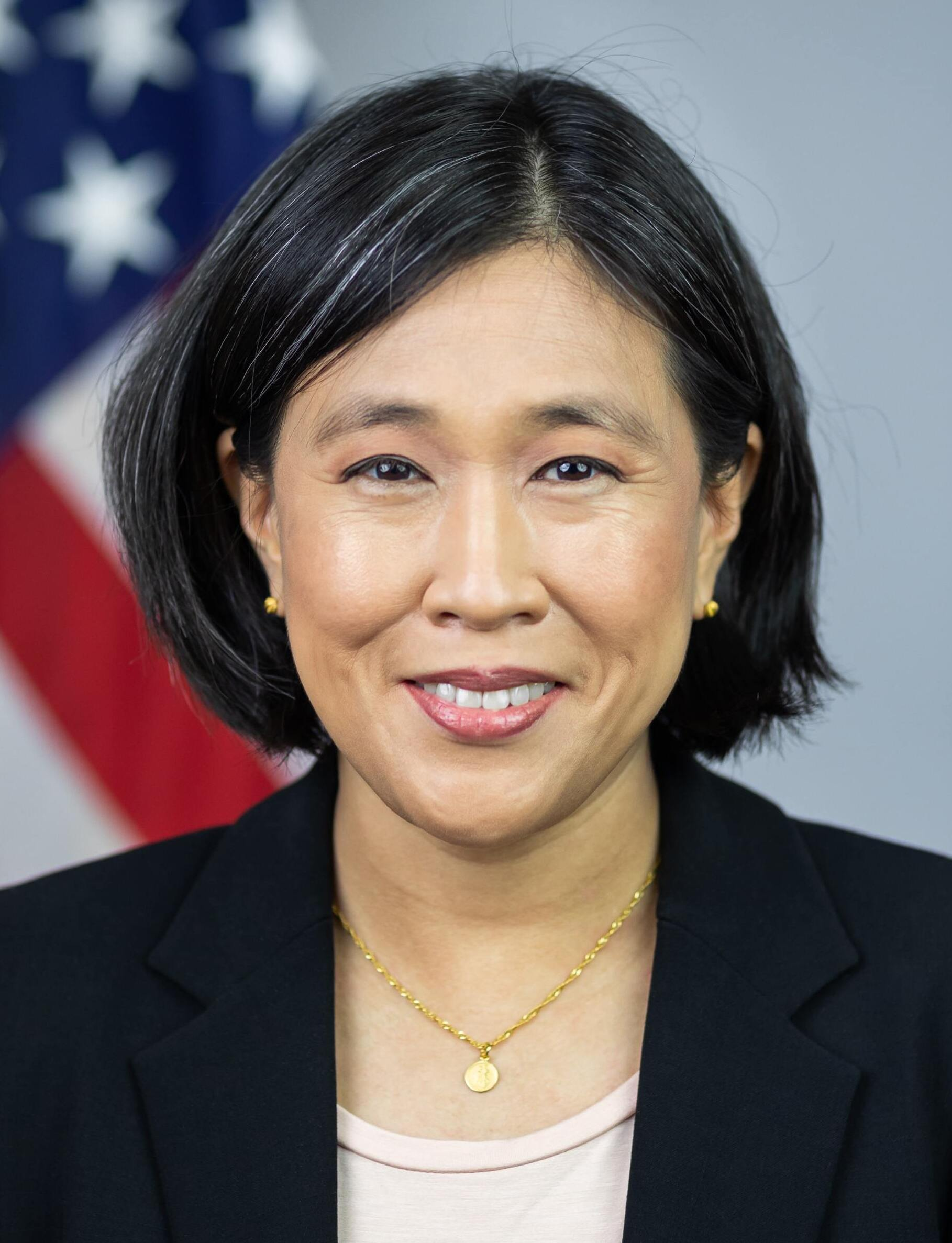
Katherine Tai
戴琪

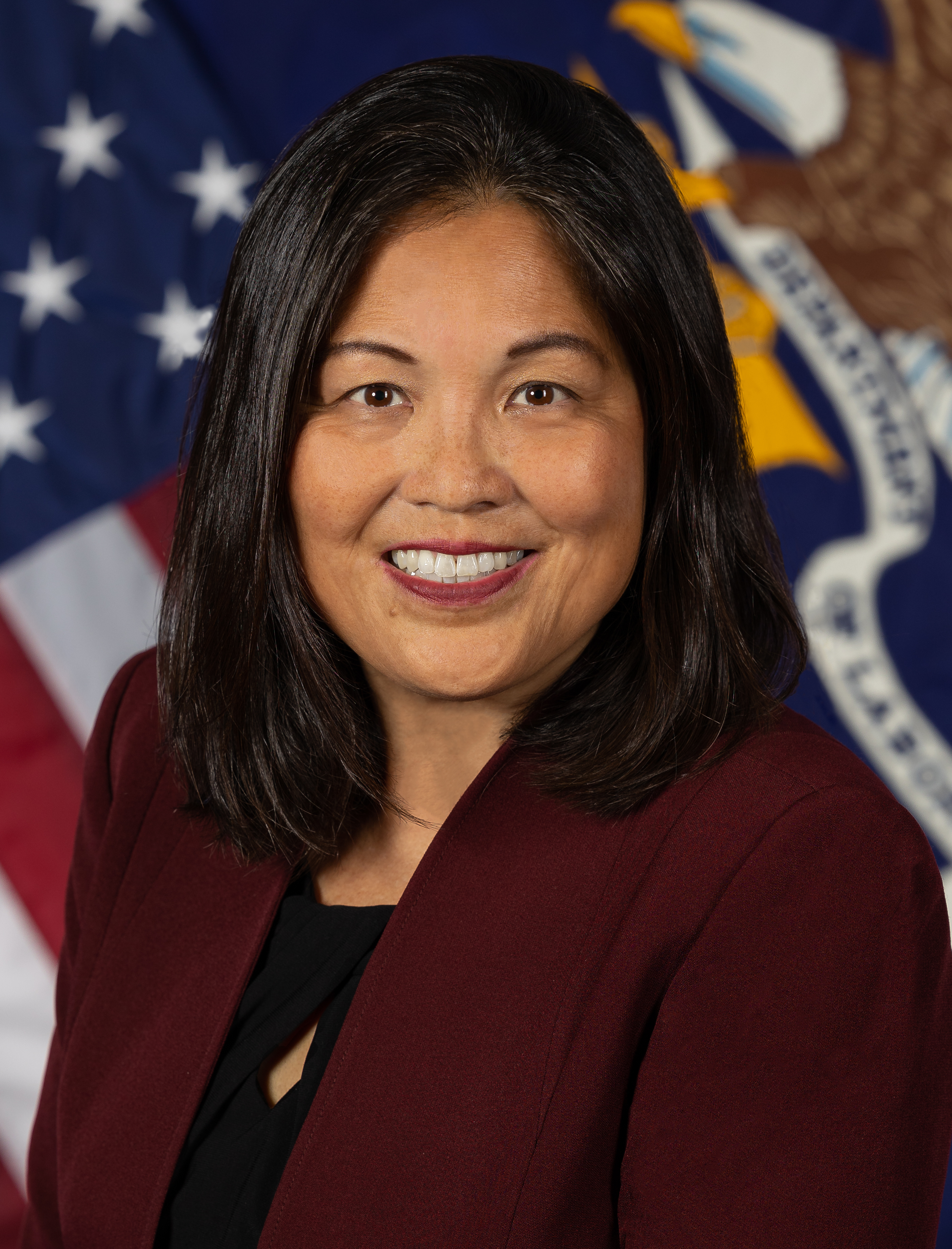
Julie Su
蘇維思

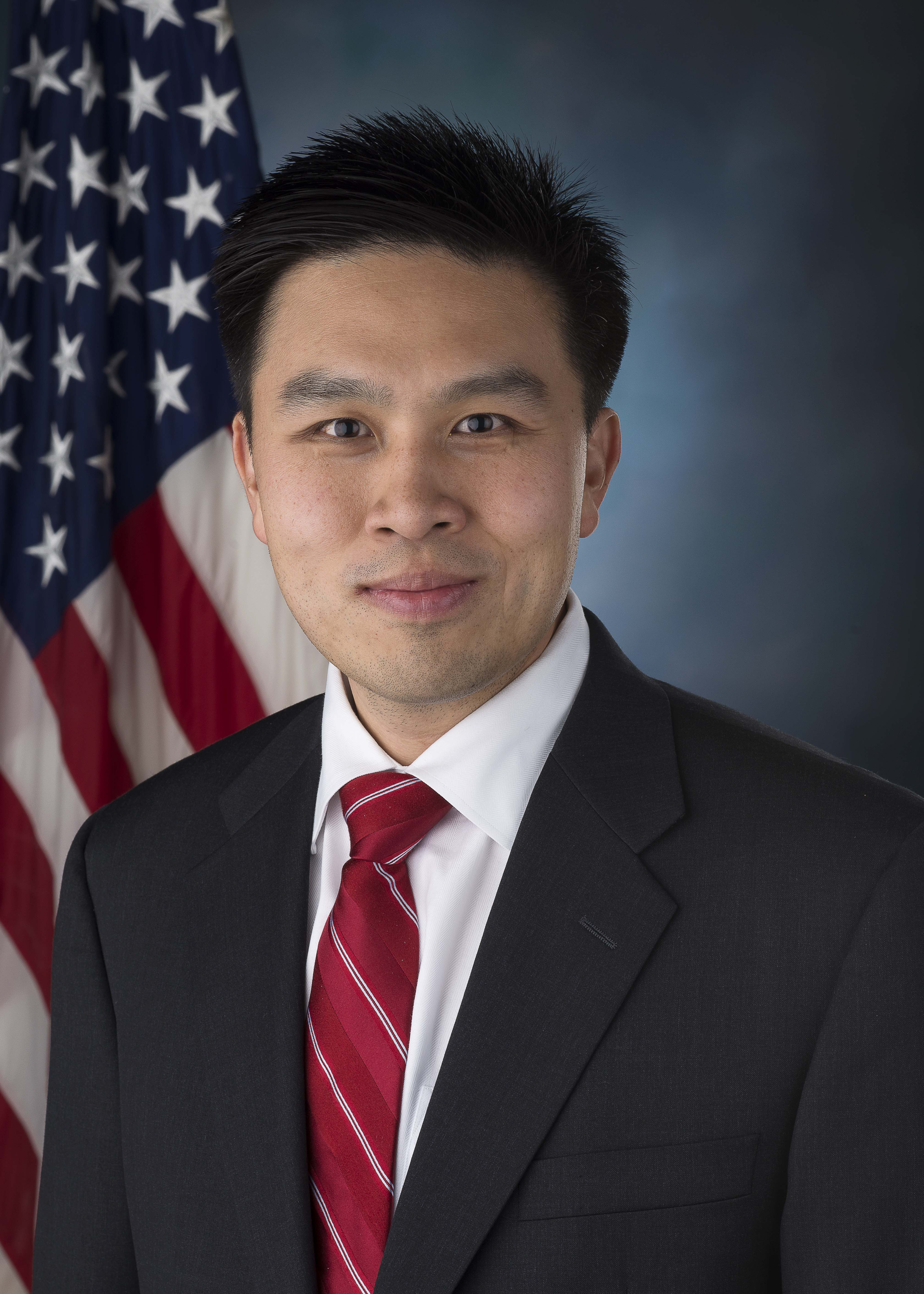
Lanhee Chen
陳仁宜

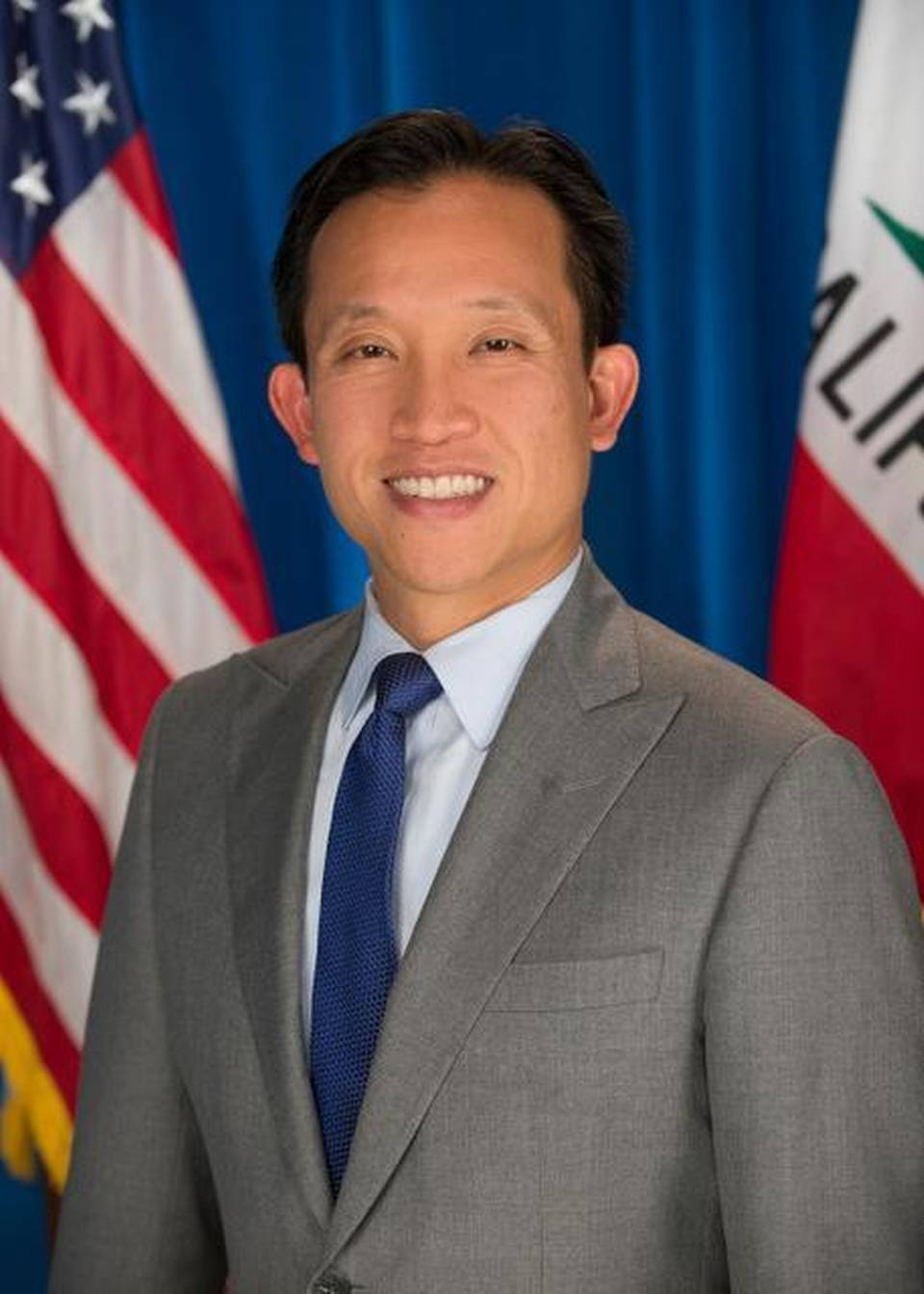
David Chiu
邱信福

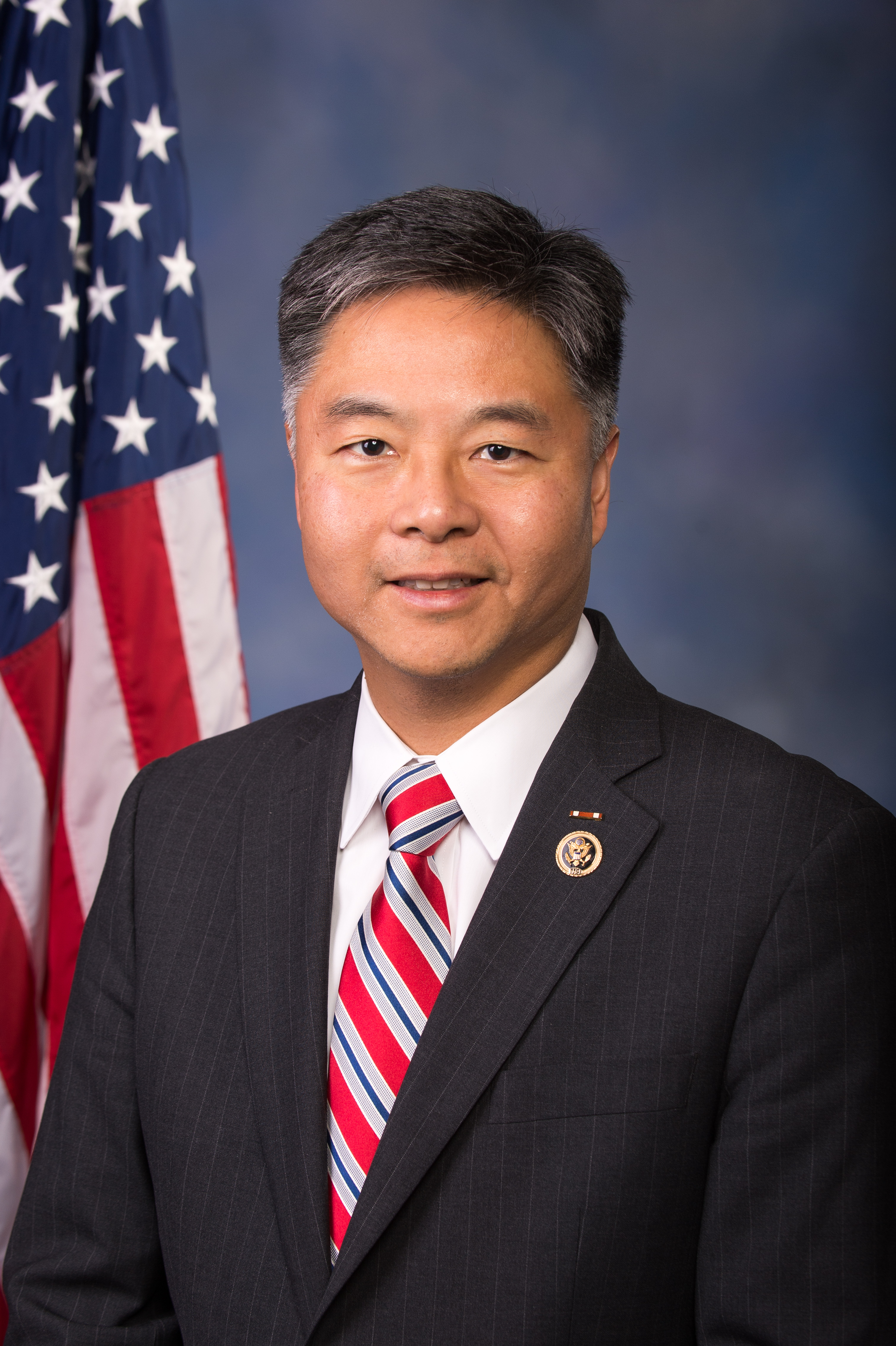
Ted Lieu
劉雲平

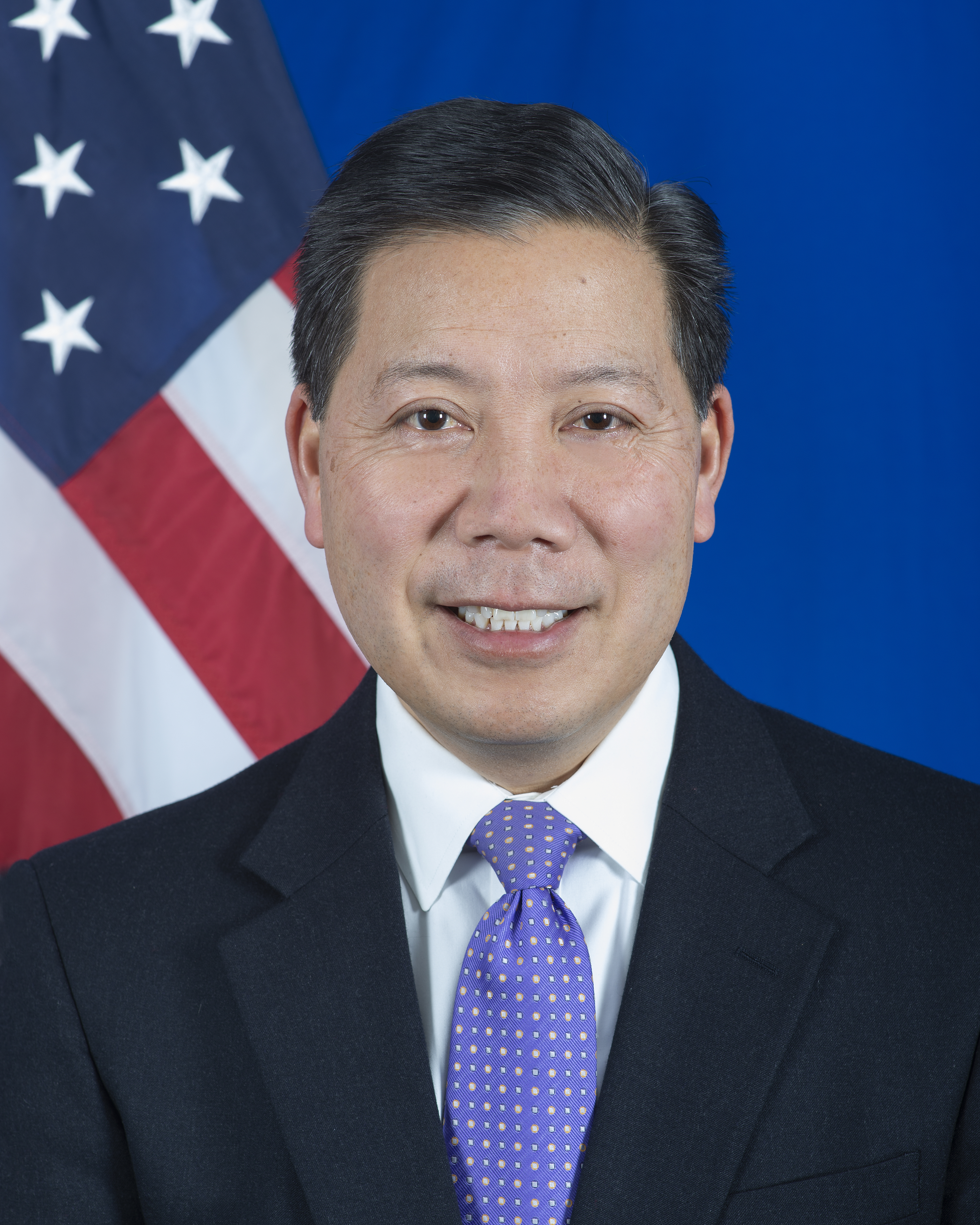
Chris Lu
盧沛寧

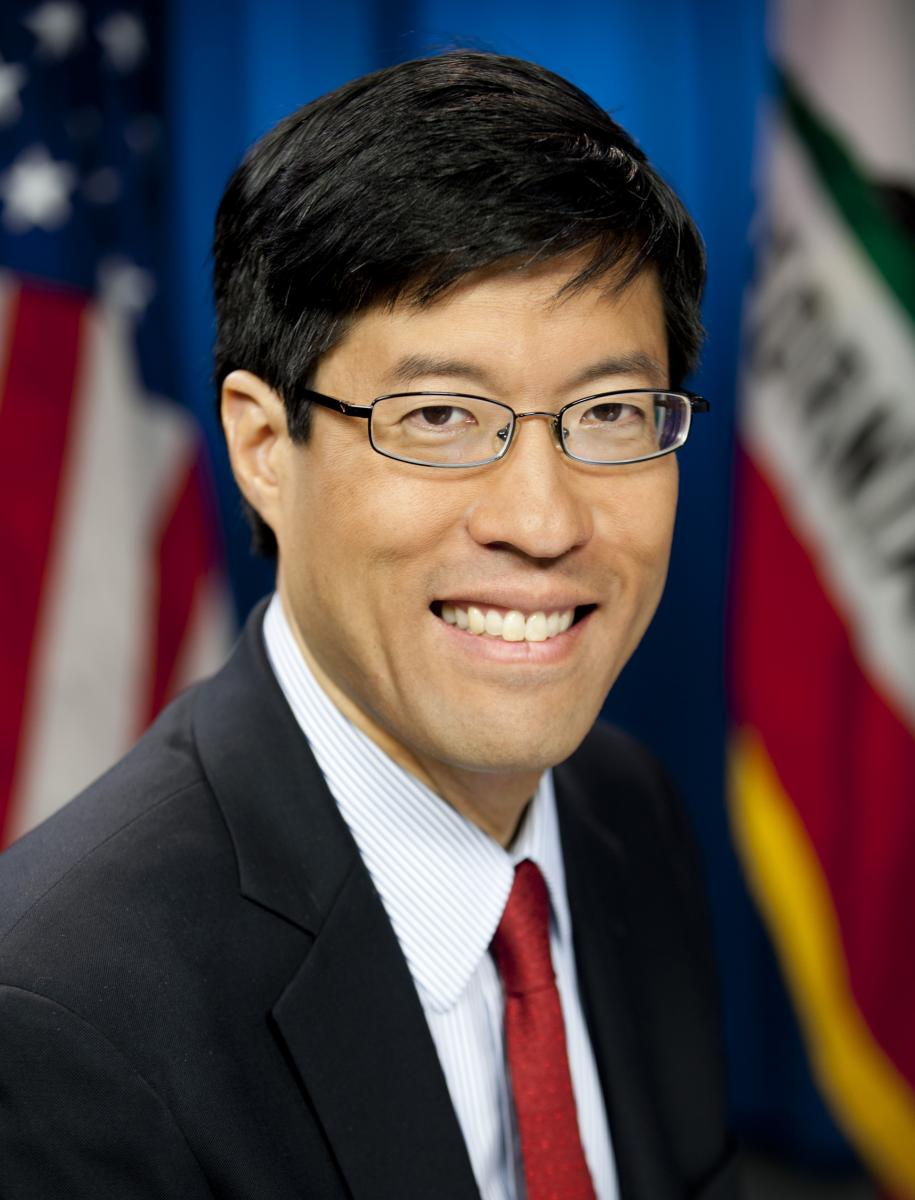
Richard Pan
潘君達

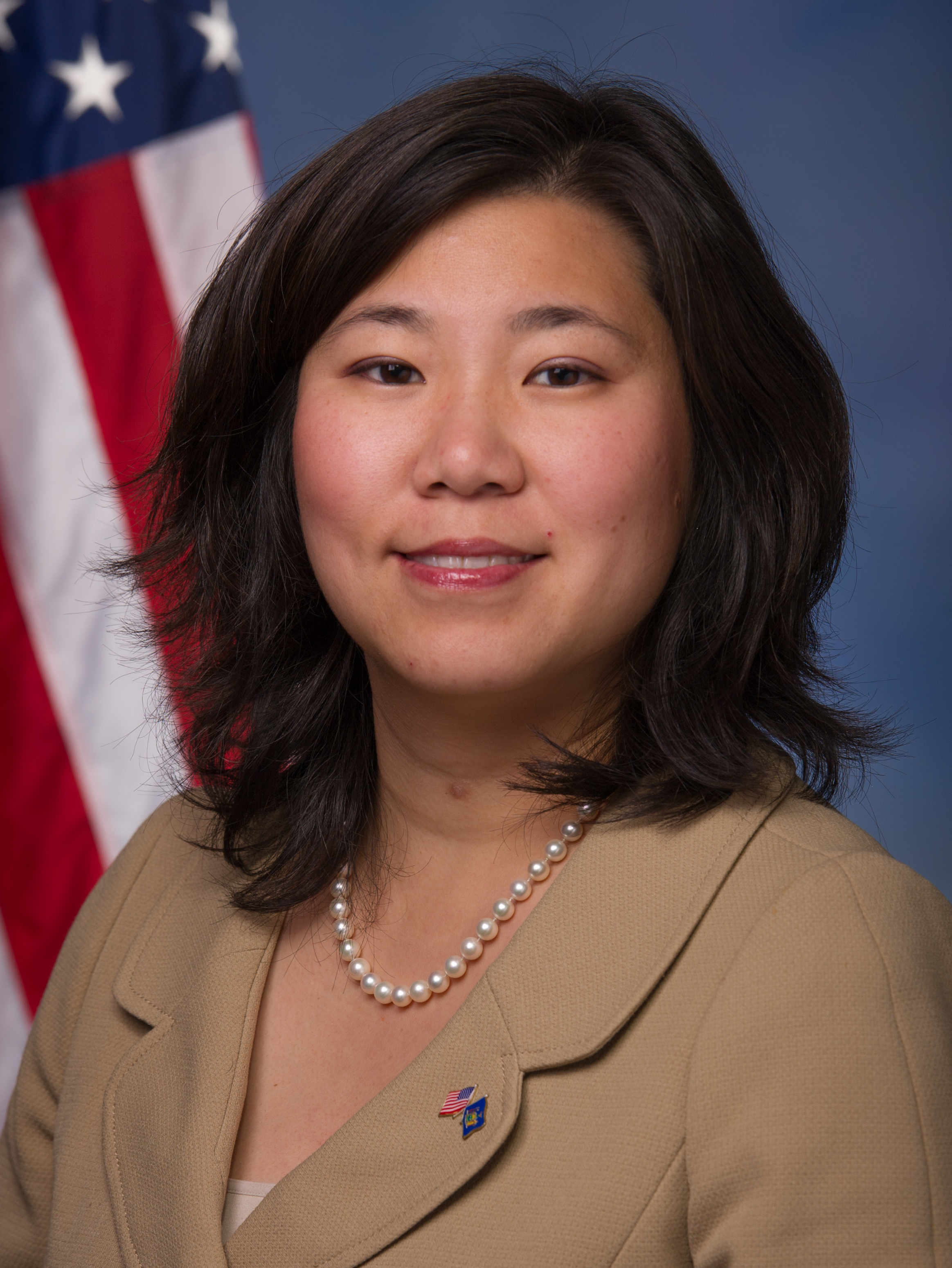
Grace Meng
孟昭文

Politics and government
Name	Birthdate	Notability
Michelle Wu	1985	54th Mayor of Boston
Elaine Chao	1953^{‡}	18th U.S. Secretary of Transportation, 24th U.S. Secretary of Labor
Andrew Yang	1975	Co-Chair of the Forward Party
David Wu	1955^{‡}	U.S. Representative for Oregon
Lanhee Chen	1978	Member of Amtrak and Social Security Advisory Board
Katherine Tai	1974	19th United States Trade Representative
Ted Lieu	1969	U.S. Representative from California
David Chiu	1970^{‡}	City Attorney of San Francisco
Grace Meng	1975	U.S. Representative from New York
John Chiang	1962	California State Treasurer
Chris Lu	1966	U.S. Deputy Secretary of Labor
Julie Su	1969	Acting U.S. Secretary of Labor
Richard Pan	1965	California State Senate Member
Ervin Yen	1954^{‡}	Oklahoma Senate Member
Portia Wu	1970	Maryland Department of Labor Secretary
Yuh-Line Niou	1983^{‡}	New York State Assembly Member
John Liu	1967^{‡}	New York State Senate Member
Goodwin Liu	1970	California Supreme Court Justice
Florence Y. Pan	1966	Judge of the Court of Appeals for the D.C. Circuit
James C. Ho	1973^{‡}	Judge of the Court of Appeals for the Fifth Circuit
Jessie Liu	1973	U.S. Attorney for the District of Columbia
William Tong	1973	Attorney General of Connecticut
Hsiao Bi-khim	1971 (Note: Born in Japan to a Taiwanese father and an American mother, Hsiao graduated from Oberlin College and Columbia University and held U.S. citizenship until 2002.)	13th Vice President of the Republic of China
Cynthia Wu	1978 (Note: Born in the United States, Wu graduated from Wellesley College and the Courtauld Institute of Art before renouncing her citizenship in 2014.)	Member of the Legislative Yuan
^{‡} Born in Taiwan

- Elisa Chan, San Antonio City Councilor
- Ling Ling Chang, California State Senator
- Angie Chen Button, Member of the Texas House of Representatives (R)
- Lily Lee Chen, former mayor of Monterey Park, California
- Raymond Chen, United States Circuit Judge on the United States Court of Appeals for the Federal Circuit
- Jim Cheng, former Virginia Secretary of Commerce
- Iwen Chu, New York State Senator
- Kansen Chu, California State Assemblyman, San Jose City Councilor, Berryessa Union School District Board member
- Mary Anne Franks, president of the Cyber Civil Rights Initiative and expert on the intersection of civil rights and technology
- Mia Gregerson, Member of the Washington House of Representatives and former member of the SeaTac City Council (D)
- James Ho, Judge of the United States Court of Appeals for the Fifth Circuit, former Solicitor General of Texas
- Tony Hwang, Member of the Connecticut State Senate, former member of the Connecticut House of Representatives (R)
- John Liu, Member of the New York State Senate, former Comptroller of New York City and member of the New York City Council (D)
- Jimmy Meng, U.S. Representative (D-NY) and father of Grace Meng
- Yuh-Line Niou, New York State Assemblywoman
- Heidi Shyu, Under Secretary of Defense for Research and Engineering
- Katy Tang, San Francisco Supervisor, District 4
- Chiling Tong, president and CEO of The National Asian Pacific Islander American Chamber of Commerce & Entrepreneurship
- Tim Wu, legal scholar, official in the Biden Administration tasked with Technology and Competition policy
- Yiaway Yeh, mayor of Palo Alto, California
- Ervin Yen, Oklahoma State Senator
- Ellen Young, former member of the New York State Assembly (D)

=== Science and education ===
- Yuan Chang, co-discovered Kaposi's sarcoma-associated herpesvirus (KSHV) and Merkel cell polyomavirus
- Steve Chen, computer scientist, supercomputer designer, Cray
- Yet-Ming Chiang, materials scientist, professor at MIT, co-founder of American Superconductor, A123 Systems, Desktop Metal
- Hong-Yee Chiu, astrophysicist
- Paul C. W. Chu, physicist, superconductivity
- Steven Chu, 1997 Nobel Prize in Physics, first Asian-American to run one of the 16 national laboratories operated by the Department of Energy (Lawrence Berkeley National Laboratory), Secretary of Energy of the United States from 2009 to 2013
- Fan Chung, mathematician
- David Ho, AIDS researcher, 1996 Time's Person of the Year
- Feng-hsiung Hsu, principal designer of the IBM Deep Blue chess machine
- Chenming Hu, developer of FinFET, National Medal of Technology and Innovation winner
- C.-T. James Huang, linguist
- Henry C. Lee, forensic scientist
- Wen Ho Lee, nuclear physicist, wrongly accused for espionage and then acquitted
- Yuan Tseh Lee, Nobel Prize in Chemistry, Professor Emeritus University of California at Berkeley (He was Taiwanese American until 1994 when he renounced his American citizenship to become the President of Academia Sinica)
- Jen Sheen, biologist
- Chang-Lin Tien, former Chancellor of the University of California at Berkeley
- Samuel Ting, Nobel Prize in Physics in 1976
- Sam Wang, neuroscientist and author
- Pei-Yuan Wei, creator of ViolaWWW
- Chi-Huey Wong, biochemist; 2014 Wolf Prize in Chemistry winner for his expertise in bioorganic and synthetic chemistry, especially in carbohydrate chemistry and chemical biology
- Alan Ming-ta Wu, molecular biologist and immunologist
- Henry T. Yang, chancellor, UC Santa Barbara
- Yang Yang, physicist, solar cells. Professor at UCLA. Fellow, American Association for the Advancement of Science, American Physical Society, Materials Research Society, Royal Society of Chemistry, and Society of Photo-Optical Instrumentation Engineers.
- Andrew Chi-Chih Yao, winner of the Turing Award; prominent computer scientist and computational theorist
- Horng-Tzer Yau, mathematician
- Nai-Chang Yeh, physicist specializing in condensed matter physics; Fellow, American Association for the Advancement of Science; Fellow, American Physical Society
- Soon Yu, international speaker, consultant, and adjunct professor at Parsons School of Design
- Yuan T. Lee, Nobel Prize laureate (later renounced U.S. citizenship)

=== Sports ===
- Joy Burke, professional basketball player
- Corbin Carroll, professional baseball player
- Michael Chang, International Tennis Hall of Fame member; youngest male tennis player to win a Grand Slam tournament
- Richard Chang, retired basketball player
- Kaitlyn Chen, professional basketball player
- Karen Chen, figure skater, 2017 U.S. national champion.
- Stuart Fairchild, professional baseball player
- Tora Harris, high jumper; also of African-American descent
- Ariel Hsing, youngest U.S. table tennis national champion
- Jerry Hsu, professional skateboarder
- Jason Jung, tennis player on ATP Tour; also won the gold medal at the 2017 Summer Universiade .
- Vania King, tennis player on WTA Tour
- Candie Kung, golf player in the LPGA
- Alexander Massialas, foil fencer
- Janet Lee, tennis player on WTA Tour
- Jeremy Lin, first Taiwanese-American player in the NBA
- Joseph Lin, professional basketball player. Younger brother of Jeremy Lin
- Howard Shu, badminton player
- Kevin Tan, 2008 Olympic Games men's gymnastics bronze medalist
- Chien-Ming Wang, professional MLB pitcher, won 19 games with New York Yankees both in 2006 and 2007.
- Timothy Wang, table tennis player

=== Other ===
- Richard Chen, celebrity chef
- Hank Chien, world champion of Donkey Kong
- Arthur Chu, Jeopardy! contestant
- Crystal Lee, beauty queen; Miss California 2013; Miss America 2014 first runner-up; Miss Chinatown USA 2010; Miss California Outstanding Teen 2008
- Wayne Lo, perpetrator of 1992 Bard College at Simon's Rock shooting
- Ai-jen Poo, labor activist, president of the National Domestic Workers Alliance
- Ming Sen Shiue – guilty of 1980 murder, rape, kidnapping
- Jian Tan, Buddhist monk and current abbot of the Chung Tai Zen Center of Houston
- Ken Wu, Taiwanese American community leader
- Nancy Wang Yuen, sociologist
