= Taiwanese Americans in the San Francisco Bay Area =

Taiwanese Americans in the Bay Area

The San Francisco Bay Area is home to the second-largest Taiwanese American population in the United States, after the Los Angeles metropolitan area, with an estimated 53,000 individuals in 2010. As of 2020, there are an estimated 32,000, or 8.4 percent of all Taiwanese Americans, in the San Jose-Sunnyvale-Santa Clara area and 32,000, or 8.4 percent of all Taiwanese Americans, in the San Francisco-Oakland-Fremont area.

== History ==
Taiwanese migration to the United States faced notable constraints prior to World War II, primarily due to Japanese governance and the Immigration Act of 1924, which categorically prohibited immigration from Asia. The emigration of people from Taiwan to the U.S. was minimal, with only a small contingent of students arriving until 1965. Following the enactment of the Immigration and Nationality Act of 1965, which relaxed restrictions and favored skilled workers, a significant number arrived as students and chose to settle, influenced in part by improved economic prospects in the U.S. and a restrictive political environment at home.

In 1949, the Chinese Communist Party assumed control of mainland China, prompting a mass migration of 2 million refugees, predominantly affiliated with the Republic of China (ROC) Nationalist government, military, and business sector, to Taiwan. Until 1979, the United States officially recognized the Kuomintang-led ROC as the sole legitimate government of China. Consequently, immigration from Taiwan was tallied within the same quota as that for both mainland China and Taiwan. Notably, due to the People's Republic of China (PRC) restricting emigration to the United States until 1977, immigrants from Taiwan predominantly filled the quota designated for individuals from China. The termination of diplomatic relations between the United States and the ROC in 1979 prompted the enactment of the Taiwan Relations Act, establishing a separate immigration quota for Taiwan distinct from that of the PRC.

Before the late 1960s, immigrants from Taiwan to the United States were often identified as "mainland Chinese" who had relocated to Taiwan with the Kuomintang (KMT) following the Communist takeover of mainland China. Subsequent waves of immigrants increasingly comprised Han Taiwanese whose ancestors had resided in Taiwan prior to 1949. The flow of Taiwanese immigration to the United States began to decrease in the early 1980s due to improving economic and political conditions in Taiwan.

Taiwanese immigration in the Bay Area picked up in the 1990s, especially as a result of the tech boom in Silicon Valley. Taiwan is a leading microchip manufacturer and dominates the global marketplace, accounting for US$115 billion, around 20 percent of the global semiconductor industry. There are also many Taiwanese executives in semiconductor companies in Silicon Valley.

The startup culture in Silicon Valley is also attractive to Taiwanese startups and aspiring entrepreneurs. Many Taiwanese startups move to the Bay Area for the incubators and opportunities in the tech industry. The Taiwan Innovation Entrepreneurship Center (TIEC) was established in 2016 in Silicon Valley to support Taiwanese startups in the Bay Area. Other efforts, such as the Hsinchu Science Park in Taiwan, attempt to draw technological talent back to Taiwan. Several startups maintain transnational business in Taiwan and the United States, with many vying to compete in the global technology market.

Home to several elite universities, such as Stanford and Berkeley, the Bay Area is also attractive to students from Taiwan. Many of these immigrants seek professional opportunities in Silicon Valley and the Bay Area after graduation. The population of Taiwanese is highly educated. 73% of Taiwanese American Immigrants held a bachelor’s degree or more in 2021

== Settlement ==
Rank	City	Taiwanese-Americans Alone or in Combination (2024 ACS estimate)
1	San Jose	9,870
2	San Francisco	5,233
3	Fremont	4,467
4	Sunnyvale	1,928
5	Mountain View	1,763
6	Cupertino	1,716
7	Santa Clara	1,621
8	Oakland	1,375
9	San Mateo	1,243
10	Pleasanton	1,173

== Culture ==
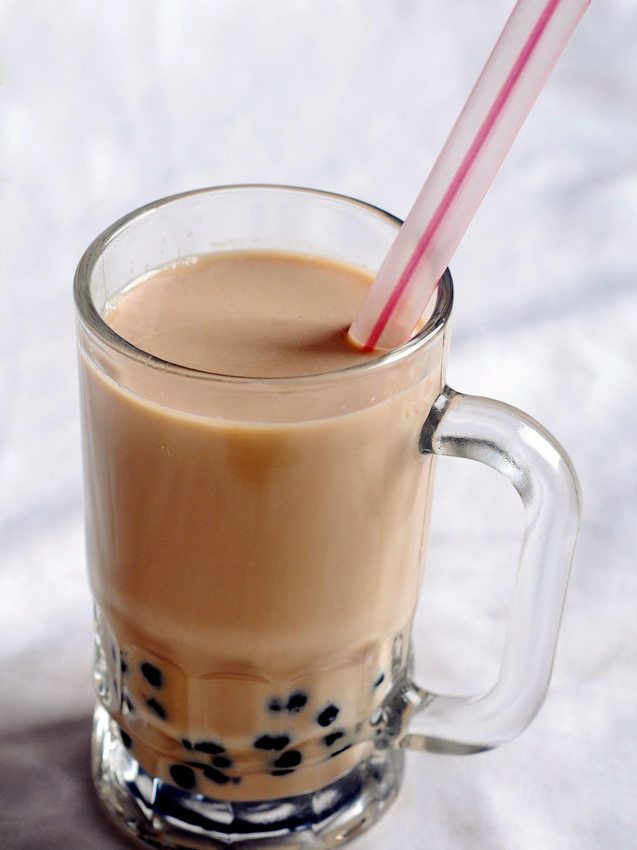
Taiwanese Boba Tea

=== Food ===
Silicon Valley is home to the majority of Taiwanese restaurants. Many of the Bay Area's Taiwanese restaurants opened in the late 1990s and early 2000s during the tech boom. Taiwanese American cuisine largely consists of dishes from Taiwan such as oyster omelet, beef noodle soup, stinky tofu, and bah tsàng, Taiwanese sticky rice dumplings. While other mainstream restaurants in the United States serve dishes that draw from the northern Chinese influence, many Bay Area restaurants serve Taiwanese cuisine influenced by the Hoklo population and Japanese influence from the period of Japanese colonization in Taiwan.

=== Organizations ===
There are several notable cultural organizations for Taiwanese Americans based in the Bay Area. They include:

- The Taiwan Alumni Association
- Taiwanese American Federation of Northern California
- Taiwanese American Professionals, San Francisco Chapter (TAP-SF)
- The North America Taiwanese Engineering & Science Association (NATEA)

=== Events ===
- Taiwanese American Cultural Festival in San Francisco, hosted annually by Taiwanese American Professionals to celebrate Taiwanese culture
- U.S. Taiwan High-Tech Forum, hosted annually by The North America Taiwanese Engineering & Science Association
- The New Frontiers in Computing Conference, hosted annually by The North America Taiwanese Engineering & Science Association and IEEE SCV Computer Society Chapter

== Notable Taiwanese Bay Area natives ==
- Literature:
  - Shawna Yang Ryan, author
- Technology and Business:
  - Yu-kai Chou, entrepreneur, author, speaker, business consultant, and experience designer. He is one of the earliest pioneers in the industry of gamification.
  - Victor Ho, co-founder and CEO of FiveStars, a customer loyalty network for small and medium businesses.
  - Jameson Hsu, CEO and co-founder of Mochi Media, a technology company that builds tools and services for content developers and distributors.
  - Jensen Huang, businessman, electrical engineer, and the co-founder, president and CEO of Nvidia Corporation.
  - Alfred Lin, venture capitalist at Sequoia Capital. Lin was the COO, CFO, and Chairman of Zappos.com until 2010.
  - Ivan Linn, entrepreneur, investor, and music programmer. He is known for his work in the music production of video games in the Final Fantasy and Kingdom Hearts series.
  - Ellen Pao, American investor and former interim CEO of social media company Reddit.
  - Tien Tzuo, American tech entrepreneur. He is the founder, chairman, and CEO of Zuora, and prior to that was chief strategy officer of Salesforce.
  - Jerry Yang, billionaire computer programmer, internet entrepreneur, and venture capitalist. He is the co-founder and former CEO of Yahoo! Inc., which he started with classmate David Filo in 1994.
  - Bing Yeh, Taiwanese-American electrical engineer and business executive.
  - Pehong Chen, businessman who co-founded Gain Technology with his Ph.D. advisor Michael A. Harrison and went on to found BroadVision.
  - Clara Wu Tsai, American businesswoman, philanthropist, and social justice activist
  - Joseph Tsai, billionaire business magnate, lawyer, and philanthropist
- Academia and Science
  - Teresa Meng, academician and entrepreneur. She is the Reid Weaver Dennis Professor of Electrical Engineering, Emerita, at Stanford University, and founder of Atheros Communications, a wireless semiconductor company acquired by Qualcomm, Inc.
  - Alice Ting, chemist at Stanford University.
  - Yuan T. Lee, chemist and a Professor Emeritus at the University of California, Berkeley. He was the first Taiwanese Nobel Prize laureate.
  - Chenming Hu, TSMC Distinguished Professor Emeritus in the electronic engineering and computer science department of the University of California, Berkeley
  - Chang-Lin Tien, professor of mechanical engineering and university administrator. He was the seventh chancellor of the University of California, Berkeley (1990–1997), and in that capacity was the first person of Asian descent to head a major research university in the United States.
- Activism and Community:
  - Chieh-Ting Yeh, co-founder of the Taiwan-focused Ketagalan Media
- Sports:
  - Jeremy Lin, professional basketball player
  - Karen Chen, Olympic figure skater

== See also ==
- White Terror (Taiwan)
- Taiwanese people in New York City
- Taiwanese Americans in Los Angeles
- Indian-Americans in the San Francisco Bay Area
- List of Taiwanese Americans
