= Asian Americans in San Francisco =

Asian Americans in San Francisco can refer to:

- History of Chinese Americans in San Francisco
- History of Japanese Americans in San Francisco
- Indian-Americans in the San Francisco Bay Area
- Taiwanese Americans in the San Francisco Bay Area
