= Subscribed (book) =

Subscribed: Why the Subscription Model Will Be Your Company's Future – and What to Do About It
- Author: Tien Tzuo and Gabe Weisert
- Language: English
- Genre: Non-fiction
- Publisher: Portfolio
- Publication date: June 5, 2018
- Publication place: United States
- Media type: Print
- Pages: 256 pp.
- ISBN: 978-0525536468

Subscribed: Why the Subscription Model Will Be Your Company's Future – and What to Do About It is a 2018 business strategy book about the subscription economy written by Tien Tzuo with Gabe Weisert.

== Overview ==
Tzuo, the co-founder and CEO of Zuora, an enterprise software company that creates and provides subscription management software for businesses, writes that the world is moving from product-based to service-based business as customers increasingly prefer access over ownership. Tzuo writes that subscription models require constant adaptation to customers needs to retain those customers, and those that do not adapt will go out of business.

The book has two sections, the first covering the origin and growth of the subscription business model, and the second section going into detail on how to succeed with a subscription model. It includes case studies of traditional businesses, such as the guitar company Fender or the manufacturer Caterpillar, that have found success offering subscription access to their products and services.

== Publication ==
The book was published by Portfolio/Penguin Random House on June 5, 2018. It spent one week on the USA Today Bestsellers list and one week on the Los Angeles Times Hardcover Nonfiction Bestsellers list.

== See also ==
- Subscription business model
