= Jen Sheen =

Taiwanese-American geneticist and molecular biologist (born 1957)

- 沈正韻
- Born: February 20, 1957 (age 69); Pingtung City, Taiwan
- Education: National Taiwan University (BS); Harvard University (PhD)
- Scientific career
- Fields: Molecular biology
- Workplaces: Harvard Medical School
- Thesis: Molecular biology of C4 photosynthesis in Zea mays (1986)
- Academic advisors: Lawrence Bogorad

Sheen Jenq-Yunn (Chinese: 沈正韻; pinyin: Shěn Zhèngyùn; born February 20, 1957) is a Taiwanese geneticist and molecular biologist known for her research on plant signaling networks. She is a professor of genetics at Harvard Medical School and a professor of molecular biology at Massachusetts General Hospital. She is an elected member of the American Association for the Advancement of Science.

== Early life and education ==
Sheen was born in Pingtung City, Taiwan, on February 20, 1957. She was raised in a rural sugarcane plantation community. Both of her parents were schoolteachers.

After high school, Sheen graduated from National Taiwan University with a Bachelor of Science (B.S.) in botany in 1980. She then earned her Ph.D. in molecular biology and developmental biology from Harvard University in 1986. Her doctoral dissertation, completed under botanist Lawrence Bogorad, was titled, "Molecular biology of C4 photosynthesis in Zea mays".

== Academic career ==
After receiving her doctorate from Harvard, Sheen received endowment funds that enabled her to start her own lab at Harvard Medical School in 1987 with flexibility that enabled her to define her own research path. She was promoted to professor of genetics in 2005. Concurrently she has held positions in molecular biology at Massachusetts General Hospital.

== Research ==
Sheen is known for her research using plants as model systems to study cell signaling. While a graduate student at Harvard University, she worked on the genetic system of maize with the goal of increasing crop yields. When starting her own lab, she established a model system using plant protoplasts, cells which can be maintained easily in laboratory containers. She then shifted her work to studying protoplasts in Arabidopsis, a plant commonly used as a model system, and Sheen has developed the use of green fluorescent protein in higher plant research. Sheen has used the plant protoplast model system to examine innate immunity, taking advantage of the plant system's ability to provide answers about innate immunity more rapidly than other systems in use. Sheen's research includes investigations into signaling pathways in plants, and has determined how plants sense sugars, and how stressors such as hydrogen peroxide are sensed by plants.

== Awards and honors ==
Sheen was elected a fellow of the American Association for the Advancement of Science in 2009. In 2013, she received the Martin Gibbs Medal from the American Society of Plant Biologists who acknowledge Sheen for "her seminal and innovative contributions to the understanding of molecular mechanisms underlying the plant signal transduction cascades that mediate nutrient, hormone, and environmental stress responses and pathogen defenses in plants".

== Selected publications ==
- Asai, Tsuneaki; Tena, Guillaume; Plotnikova, Joulia; Willmann, Matthew R.; Chiu, Wan-Ling; Gomez-Gomez, Lourdes; Boller, Thomas; Ausubel, Frederick M.; Sheen, Jen (February 2002). "MAP kinase signalling cascade in Arabidopsis innate immunity". Nature. 415 (6875): 977–983. Bibcode:2002Natur.415..977A. doi:10.1038/415977a. ISSN 1476-4687. PMID 11875555. S2CID 4419225.
- Yoo, Sang-Dong; Cho, Young-Hee; Sheen, Jen (July 2007). "Arabidopsis mesophyll protoplasts: a versatile cell system for transient gene expression analysis". Nature Protocols. 2 (7): 1565–1572. doi:10.1038/nprot.2007.199. ISSN 1750-2799. PMID 17585298. S2CID 8852255.
- Kovtun, Yelena; Chiu, Wan-Ling; Tena, Guillaume; Sheen, Jen (14 March 2000). "Functional analysis of oxidative stress-activated mitogen-activated protein kinase cascade in plants". Proceedings of the National Academy of Sciences. 97 (6): 2940–2945. doi:10.1073/pnas.97.6.2940. ISSN 0027-8424. PMC 16034. PMID 10717008.
