= The Bodyguard (2016 film) =

2016 Hong Kong-Chinese film by Sammo Hung

- Official film poster

Chinese name
- Traditional Chinese: 特工爺爺
- Simplified Chinese: 特工爷爷
Transcriptions
Standard Mandarin
- Hanyu Pinyin: Tè Gōng Yé Yé
Yue: Cantonese
- Jyutping: Dak6 Gung1 Je4 Je2
- Directed by: Sammo Hung
- Screenplay by: Kong Kwan
- Produced by: Andy Lau; William Kong; Chan Pui-wah; Ivy Ho; Lau Yee-tung
- Starring: Sammo Hung; Andy Lau; Zhu Yuchen; Li Qinqin
- Cinematography: Ardy Lam
- Edited by: Kwong Chi-leung; Lo Wai-lun
- Music by: Alan Wong; Janet Yung
- Production companies: Irressistible Films; Edko Films; Focus Films; EDKO (Beijing) Distribution; Good Friends Entertainment; Shanghai Tencent Qie Pictures; BDI Films; Lava Bear Films
- Distributed by: Edko Films
- Release date: 1 April 2016
- Running time: 99 minutes
- Countries: Hong Kong; China
- Languages: Cantonese; Mandarin
- Box office: US$52.4 million

The Bodyguard, also known as My Beloved Bodyguard (Chinese: 特工爺爺), is a 2016 action film starring and directed by Sammo Hung in his first film as director since 1997 and produced by Andy Lau, who makes a special appearance. A Hong Kong-Chinese co-production, the film was released on 1 April 2016.

== Plot ==
The film is set in the 2000s in a medium-sized Chinese city located in northeast China, close to the Russian border. An old, overweight man named Ding witnesses a man being stabbed by a gang, but when he is summoned by the police to identify the suspect, he hesitates and is unable to. The police research Ding's background and discover that he is a retired Central Security Bureau officer from Beijing, and they figure that he is suffering from dementia. Back at his home, Ding is frequently invited for supper by his land-lord, Park, an elderly lady who is attracted to him. Ding, in turn, frequently cares for a little girl next door named Cherry, whose father, Li, is an abusive gambler.

When Li becomes heavily in debt because of his gambling, Choi, a Chinese person of Korean descent, who happens to be the leader of the aforementioned gang, forces Li to embark on a criminal assignment. Li is driven to a hotel and told to steal the shoulder-bag of a Russian gang leader. The alarm is raised but Li escapes with the bag after a protracted chase. However, upon being told that his debt isn't absolved, Li goes into hiding, taking the bag with him. Choi reacts by sending men to abduct Li's daughter. Meanwhile, the Russian gang leader feels angry and plans an attack against Choi's gang for violating their territory.

Choi's gang members follow Cherry and assault Ding's home after she enters it, but to their dismay, Ding proves to be a remarkable fighter, and they are repelled. To avoid arrest, two of them are sent by Choi to hide in the countryside. The police, noticing that Li has disappeared, send Cherry to live with her aunt and uncle. However, within a short time, the aunt and uncle wish to eject her, and Ding agrees to provide for her living. Then one night, Cherry goes missing, and what is more, Li suddenly appears in Ding's home, bringing money in order to compensate Ding for his service. As Li exits the house, he is assaulted by Choi's gang and killed, and the shoulder-bag is taken back.

Ding, who has been plagued with guilt for years, ever since his granddaughter went missing on a hiking trip, resolves to bring Cherry back using force. He visits the gambling house demanding Cherry's release, and when Choi's gang attempts to kill him, he overpowers around 20 of them including a skilled knife assassin. At that moment, some of the Russian gang members appear and start to kill the rest of Choi's men in an attempt to reclaim their stolen money. Seeing this, Choi escapes, but not before Ding wounds his leg. The Russians proceed to attack Ding, believing that he works for Choi, and Ding is forced to kill them. At the same time, the police, led by Park's son, chase after two leaders of the Russian gang, who die when they collide with a truck. Choi, who thinks he is safe, is approached by the two subordinates he sent into the countryside. They proceed to murder Choi and to rob him, having accepted a Russian bribe to do so.

In the aftermath of the incident, Ding's dementia worsens, and he is paralyzed by the loss of Cherry. The police make no attempt to blame Ding, recognizing that his actions were self-defense. Suddenly, Cherry returns, revealing that she simply ran off to live at a friend's house. Even as Ding forgets his family members, he remembers his relationship with Cherry, who cares for him well into his senescence. In a scene after the credits, the two countryside criminals accidentally encounter a group of drilling PLA military police, who turn and give chase. After a short chase the remaining criminals are captured.

== Cast ==
Main cast

- Sammo Hung as Ding Hu
- Zhu Yuchen as Park Chan-Seong, Madam Park's son who work as cop
- Li Qinqin as Park Seo-Neon, Ding's neighbour
- Feng Jiayi as Choi Dong-hoon
- Jacqueline Chan as Cherry Li, Li Zheng Jiu's daughter

Special appearance

- Andy Lau as Li Zheng Jiu

Guest appearances

- Hu Jun as Cop #3
- Feng Shaofeng as Doctor Hu
- Eddie Peng as Cop #2
- Song Jia as Cherry's mother
- Tsui Hark as Old Man #3
- Karl Maka as Old Man #
- Dean Shek as Old Man #1
- Yuen Biao as Cop #1
- Yuen Qiu as School teacher
- Yuen Wah as Mail Man
- Yuen Ting
- Yuen Po
- Jonathan Kos-Read as Ding's son-in-law
- James Lee Guy as Sergei
- Tomer Oz as Vasily
- Yi Heng Du as Jin Si

== Production ==
Jackie Chan was originally offered a role in the film. However, Chan turned down the role due to scheduling conflicts and his son Jaycee Chan's recent drug arrest. Filming for The Bodyguard began in August 2014. On 22 September, guest star Andy Lau filmed an action scene in Vladivostok, Russia in which he portrays a thief who stole a bag of diamonds and flees by jumping from a building to the top of a car. That same day, director Sammo Hung also said that there were only ten days of scenes left that had yet to be filmed.

Filming took place in Suifenhe and Mudanjiang, Heilongjiang province of China and in Vladivostok, Russia and its surroundings. After arriving in Vladivostok on 18 September, the film crew of 150 members began shooting scenes two days later, which were being done near the Hotel Versailles, on Russky Island and at an old cemetery outside Ussuriysk during a five-day-long shoot.

== Reception ==
The film grossed US$8.4 million on its opening day in mainland China and was number-one on the opening weekend, with CN¥164 million (US$25.2 million). It grossed US$52.8 million worldwide.

== See also ==
- List of Hong Kong films of 2016
- Sammo Hung filmography
