= Lawrence Bogorad =

American botanist (1921–2003)

Lawrence Bogorad (29 August 1921 – 28 December 2003) was an American botanist, pioneer of photosynthesis research and President of the American Association for the Advancement of Science. He was a member of the American Academy of Arts and Sciences, the National Academy of Sciences, and the American Philosophical Society. He received the Quantrell Award.
