= Ken Wu =

Taiwan independence activist

- 吳兆峯
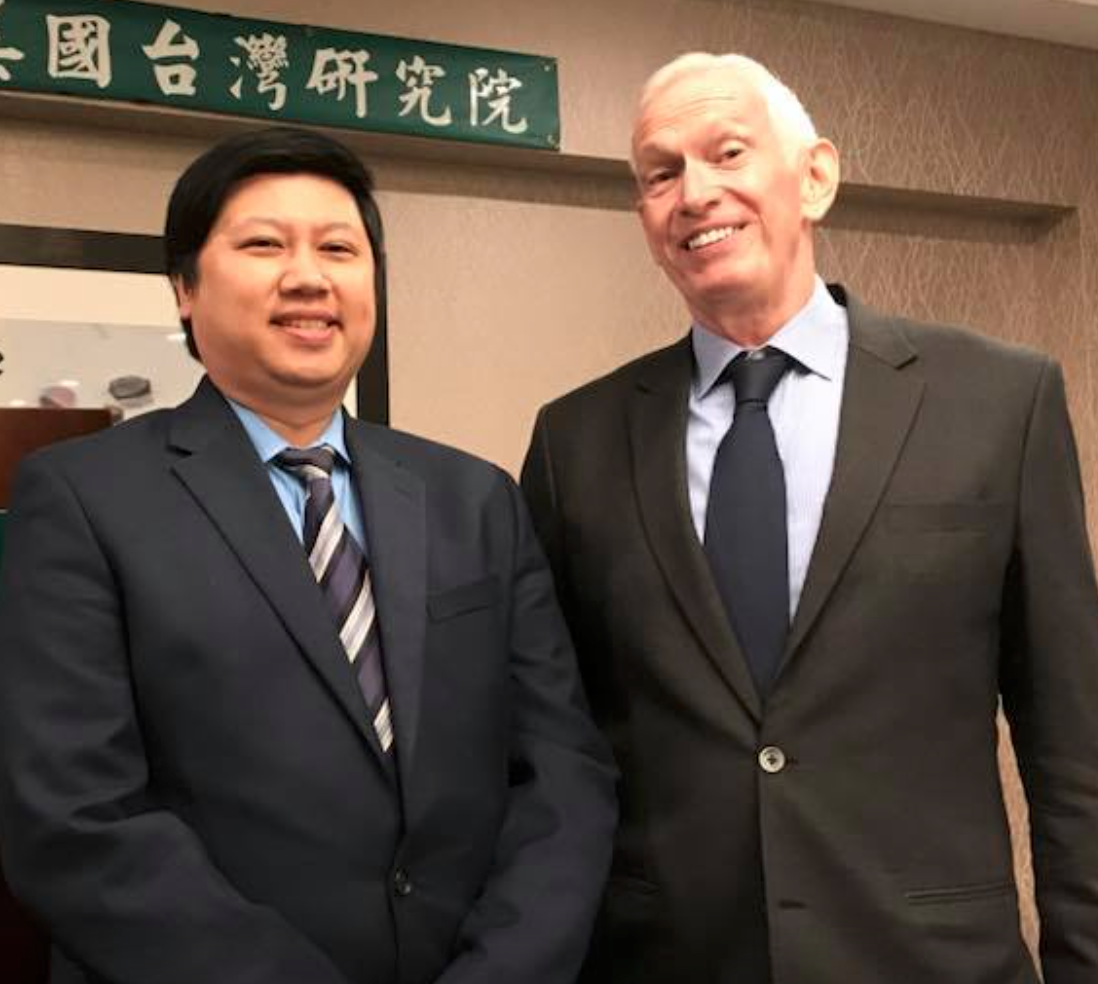
- Wu and AIT Chairman James F. Moriarty at ITS event
- Born: Chao Feng Wu; 19 October 1980 (age 45); Taipei, Taiwan
- Education: University of California, Los Angeles (BA)
- Known for: World United Formosans for Independence; Formosan Association for Public Affairs; Democratic Progressive Party; Taiwanese American Heritage Week; Taiwan Center of Greater Los Angeles
- Political party: DPP

Chao Feng Wu (Chinese: 吳兆峯, born October 19, 1980), also known as Ken Wu, is an American community leader based in Los Angeles area and proponent of Taiwan Independence movement.

He is the chapter president of Formosan Association for Public Affairs (FAPA) Los Angeles Chapter and chipo(branch) head of World United Formosans for Independence or WUFI, an organization promoting Taiwan independence. Wu is the secretary-general of Taiwan Center Foundation of Greater Los Angeles, who also serves as the foundation's board member and is the chairman of Taiwanese American Heritage Week Committee of Greater Los Angeles for the years 2017 and 2018.

Wu also serves as an executive committee member of the Democratic Progressive Party US West Chapter and due to his many involvements in the overseas Taiwanese community, he also serves as an Overseas Community Affairs Council advisor for the Los Angeles area.

== Early life and education ==
Wu was born in Monga District of Taipei, Taiwan and attended Taipei Dong Yuan Elementary School in Taipei until he emigrated to Seattle, Washington, USA at age ten. Wu attended Eckstein Middle School and Roosevelt High School in Seattle and finished his high school studies at Monta Vista High School in Cupertino, California. He graduated in 2003 from the University of California, Los Angeles, where he completed his studies in economics and public policy.

At UCLA, he directed and produced the stage play Typhoon Night when he served as the director of Taiwanese American Union (TAU)'s Taiwanese Culture Night (TCN).

== Career ==
Wu decided to pursue a professional career in banking and investments for a major American bank after college before he became more involved in Taiwanese American community works.

Wu believes the naturally independent"(天然獨) generation are more supportive of Taiwan independence and are more willing to sacrifice for their nation for they just want to have a Taiwanese nation for the people of Taiwan. Wu sees the greatest challenge of Taiwan independence movement is its lack of consensus among different generations of Taiwan independence advocates. On US-Taiwan relations, Wu suggests Taiwan is not a pawn but a lead role.

As FAPA Los Angeles chapter president, Wu organized genocide prevention events that aimed to commemorate February 28 Incident and further mutual understandings of various ethnic groups victimized by government oppression.

Wu in the 2017 event stood with featured keynote speaker Rebiya Kadeer and openly support the independence movement for Taiwan and East Turkestan, and against Chinese government.

Wu is listed in Marquis Who's Who for "leadership in civic diplomacy and cross-cultural service." Among other accomplishments, Who's Who honored Wu's advocacy for advancing the Taiwan Travel Act, a law which permits diplomats from the governments of the U.S. and Taiwan to travel and meet with each other.
