= Yu-kai Chou =

Taiwanese-American businessman

- 周郁凱
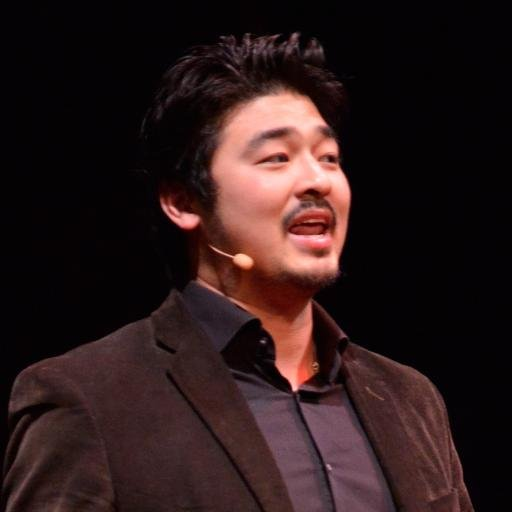
- Chou speaking at TEDx Talks
- Born: May 9, 1986 (age 40); Taipei, Taiwan
- Education: University of California, Los Angeles (BA)
- Occupations: Entrepreneur, Author, Lecturer, Consultant, Gamification Designer
- Years active: Since 2003
- Known for: Gamification
- Notable work: Octalysis Framework
- Website: www.yukaichou.com

Yu-kai Chou (Chinese: 周郁凱; born May 9, 1986) is a Taiwanese-American entrepreneur, author, speaker, business consultant, and experience designer. He is one of the earliest pioneers in the industry of gamification. He has been a regular keynote speaker lecturer on Gamification at organizations like TEDx Lausanne, Stanford University, Harvard University, Yale, MIT, Google, Tesla, Lego, Huawei, Uber, Boston Consulting Group, among others. Chou is the creator of the Octalysis Framework and the Co-Founder (with CEO Joris Beerda) of the consultancy The Octalysis Group and the mentorship education platform Octalysis Prime.

== Early life and education ==
Chou was born in Taipei, Taiwan. Because of his father's work as a diplomat for the Taiwanese government, he grew up in Taiwan, South Africa, and the United States. He received a Bachelor of Arts in economics and international studies from the University of California, Los Angeles (UCLA), in 2007.

== Career ==
2003, Chou started his research on gamification and helped pioneer the gamification industry. Chou started his first company, The FD Network, which connected professionals of various industries together to help each other through a gamified system.

2007, Chou co-founded Future Delivery, LLC., a company that focuses on gamified productivity and professional development. Its flagship project FDCareer, was rated on Mashable as one of the “Top 10 Social Networks for Generation-Y” in 2009.

2009, Chou co-founded Viralogy, Inc., a gamified social media rank aiming to become a leaderboard of the top online influencers. It later launched the gamified restaurant and retail loyalty program RewardMe.

2012, Chou stepped down as CEO of Viralogy, Inc., and published his Octalysis gamification framework on his blog to analyze and build strategies around the various systems to increase motivation and engagement. It was widely received, and his work was organically translated into over 16 languages within a year. Chou then started to speak across the globe and teach his Octalysis Framework.

2015 The Octalysis Framework was published in Actionable Gamification: Beyond Points, Badges, and Leaderboard. The book has also been published in Taiwan, South Korea, China.

2016, Chou co-founded The Octalysis Group. The Octalysis Group is a premium design and consulting firm specializing in gamification and behavioral design using the Octalysis Framework. The firm served globally recognized companies like Porsche, Uber, Volkswagen, Microsoft, AIG Japan, Lego, Huawei, eBay, CapitalOne, Avon, Fidelity Investments, among others

2018, Yu-kai Chou was appointed Chief Experience Officer for Toronto-based Decentral, helping Ethereum Cofounder Anthony Di Iorio improve experiences for the cryptocurrency wallet Jaxx Liberty.

2018, Chou also launched Octalysis Prime, a gamified education and mentorship platform to pass on his knowledge in gamification, entrepreneurship, productivity and behavioral science to subscribed members.

In 2021, Yu-kai Chou was appointed Head of Digital Commerce and Head of Creative Labs for HTC in Taiwan. He helped improve HTC's digital presence and the launching of VR Headsets such as the VIVE Focus 3 and the VIVE Flow.

In 2025, Chou published his second book, 10,000 Hours of Play. The book reimagines Malcolm Gladwell concept from Outliers (2008), which popularized the idea—rooted in Anders Ericsson's research—that mastery in any field demands approximately 10,000 hours of deliberate practice. Chou reframes Gladwell’s premise of rigorous effort by proposing that mastery can be achieved through enjoyment instead of toil, suggesting that a gamified approach to learning, where practice becomes engaging and playful, could transform the journey to expertise.

== Global Influence ==
In 2022, Chou was honored with the title of a Knight by His Imperial Highness King Yi Seok, the only remaining heir living in Korea to the Joseon dynasty throne which ruled over the country for five centuries. The Imperial Family of Korea is the ruling family of the Joseon and Korean Empire that was founded by King Seong-gye Lee in July 1392. In 2023, Chou was promoted to the title of Duke by His Imperial Highness King Andrew Lee.

Chou has contributed to U.S. government–sponsored projects in the energy sector, IT security, smart homes, health care, and medicine.

Chou’s framework has also been applied in US education, including mathematics, and English language learning at the primary school level. It has further been referenced in peer-reviewed STEM education research, including empirical studies published in scientific journals.

Chou's Octalysis framework has also been referenced in academic papers in higher education over 3,900 times on Google Scholar.

== Awards and recognitions ==
Rated #1 among the “Gamification Gurus Power 100” by RISE in 2015

“Gamification Guru of the Year” Award in 2014, 2015 and 2017 by the World Gamification Congress

Rated “#1 Industry Project in Gamification” in 2017 by the Gamification Europe Conference

“Gamification Guru of the Year” in 2017 by the Gamification Europe Conference.

== Personal life ==
Chou has been an avid fan of video games since his childhood in South Africa. Yu-kai converted to Christianity from Atheism in 2002 and has publicly declared his faith through his work.

== See also ==
- Octalysis
- Gamification
- List of Taiwanese Americans
