= Greenliant Systems =

US semiconductor manufacturer

- Company type: Private
- Industry: Semiconductors, Storage, IT
- Founded: 2010; 16 years ago
- Headquarters: San Jose, California, United States
- Area served: North America; Europe; Asia
- Key people: Bing Yeh, (Founder, Chairman and CEO)
- Products: Solid-state drives Flash memory controllers Semiconductors
- Number of employees: 130
- Website: www.greenliant.com

Greenliant Systems is a U.S. manufacturer of NAND flash memory-based solid-state storage, controller semiconductors for embedded systems, and data center products. It is headquartered in San Jose, California, with offices in North America, Europe and Asia.

== History ==
Silicon Storage Technology (SST) developed NANDrive technology, and was acquired in April 2010 by Microchip Technology. SST's founder and CEO Bing Yeh founded Greenliant along with other former SST executives after the acquisition.

In May 2010, Greenliant acquired the NANDrive technology and other assets from Microchip for an estimated $23.6 million.

The Greenliant logo symbolizes a multi-chip module with an energy-efficient core and the name represents green and reliable.
