= Octalysis =

Gamification design framework

The Octalysis Framework is a human-focused gamification design framework that lays out the eight core drives for humans motivation developed by Yu-Kai Chou.

The framework lays out the structure for analyzing the driving forces behind human motivation. It is the process of applying the core behavior drives that motivate a user to complete a task efficiently through an interactive experience. The Octalysis framework is used in healthcare, fitness, education, training, company, and product design to increase user engagement, ROI and motivation.

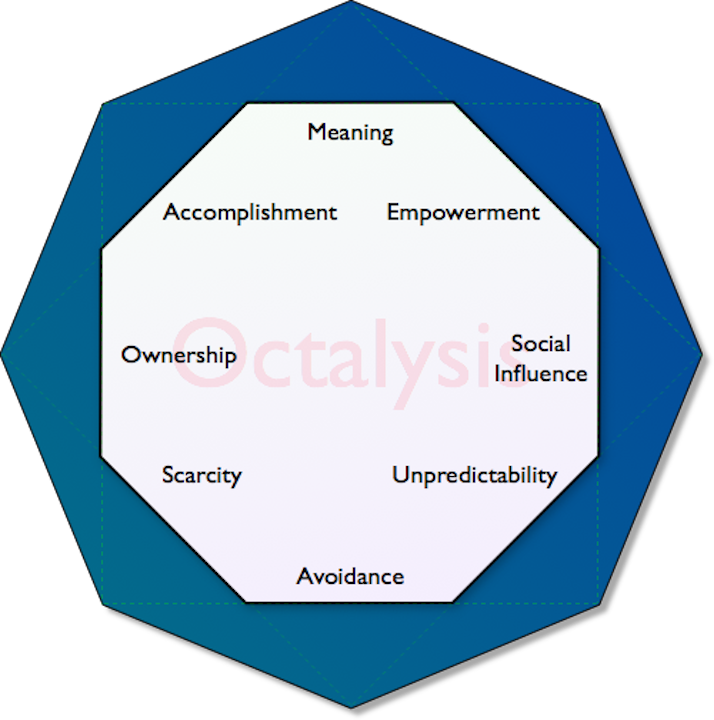
Octalysis

mHealth has developed applications based on the Octalysis framework to assist people in self-care management and self-stress management. They are using the framework to map how top rated stress management apps address the right brain drives and to provide motivation to increase adherence.

Other global companies that have used or been inspired by the Octalysis Framework include IDEO, Google, LEGO, Volkswagen, and Huawei.

== See also ==
- Gamification
- Motivation
- Behavioral Economics
