= Soon Yu =

Taiwanese writer

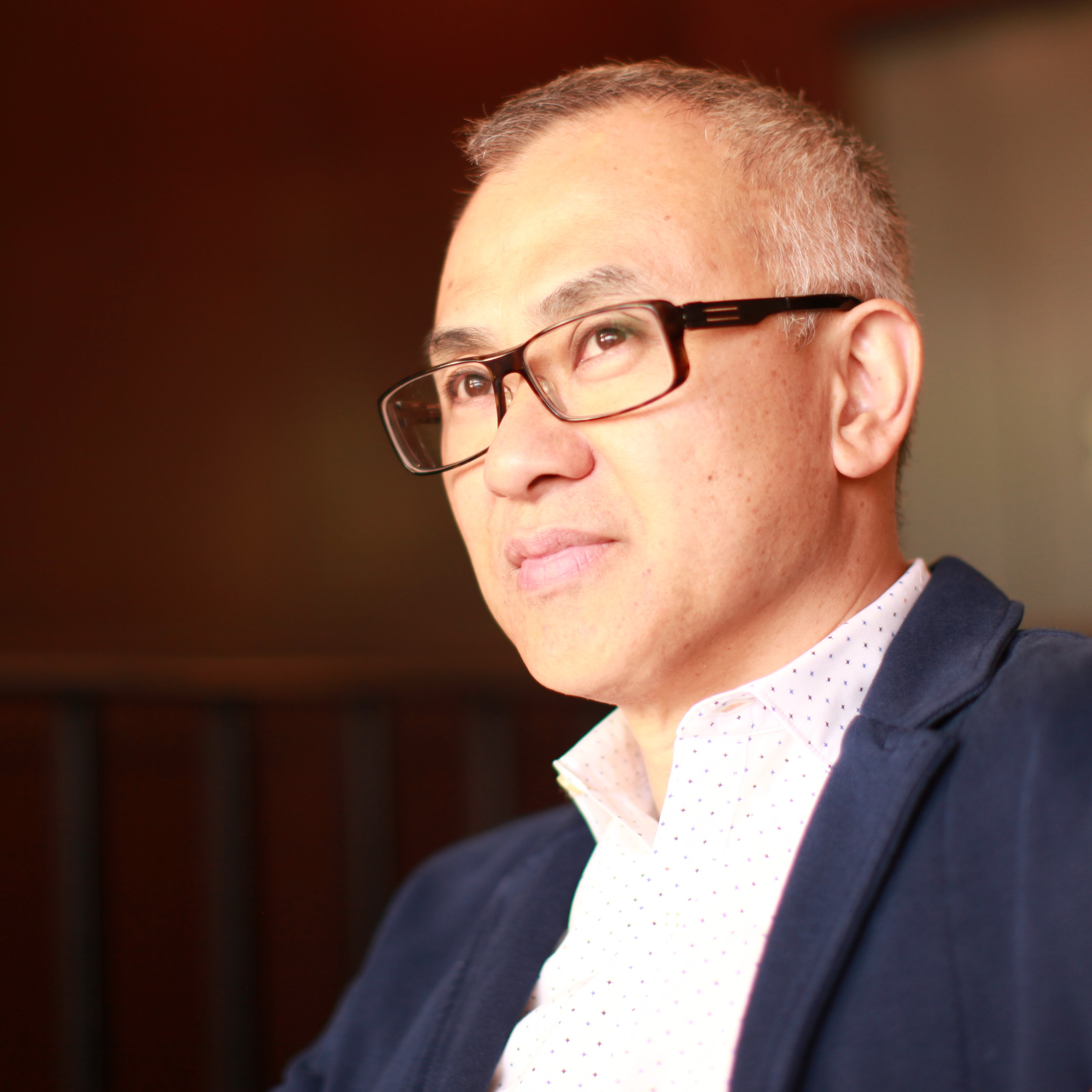
- Born: August 5, 1965 (age 61); Taiwan
- Education: University of California, Davis (BS); Stanford University (MBA)
- Organization(s): Writer, public speaker, consultant
- Website: www.soonyu.com

Soon Yu (born August 5, 1965) is a Taiwanese-American speaker, writer and former adjunct professor at The New School's Parsons School of Design. Yu is the founder of Gazoontite, the author of the book Iconic Advantage and Friction, and host of Aconic Podcast.

== Early life and education ==
Yu was born in Taiwan and moved at age 3 to Davis, California, where his father was an agricultural geneticist. Soon received his BS in electrical engineering from the University of California, Davis in 1988 and his MBA from Stanford University in 1993.

== Career ==
Soon served as the global VP of innovation and as a corporate officer for VF Corporation from 2010 to 2016. Prior to working at VF Corporation, he has also worked at The Clorox Company He left his management position at Clorox to pursue a sales associate position at Crate & Barrel, taking an 85% pay cut and earning $5/hour to gain retail experience. He has also held positions as an engineer with Advanced Micro Devices, an associate consultant with Bain & Company, general manager at Chiquita Brands International, and chief marketing officer at SafeWeb.

In 1998, Yu founded Gazoontite, a retailer of allergy and asthma related products. It was one of the first retail/eCommerce companies to promote and build its business model around the multi-channel shopping environment. Two years after its launch, the Wall Street Journal called Gazoontite “a poster child of web-era excess and stupidity”, however, in the process Yu set the tone for what is now referred to as omni-channel retailing.

His book, Friction: Adding Value By Making People Work For It won the 2022 NYC Big Book Award in Sales & Marketing. His book, Iconic Advantage, won the 2019 Axiom Business Book Award in Advertising / Marketing / PR / Event Planning.

He is host of the Aconic Podcast, which won Signal Awards Gold in the Genre - Diversity, Equity and Inclusion for its episode with Sheila Lirio Marcelo, CEO of Ohai.ai and founder of Care.com.

Other guests that the podcast has featured are Dion Lim, Lanhee Chen, Gov. Gary Locke, Samantha Tan, Victor Koo, Kristi Yamaguchi, Jeremy Lin, Andrew Yang, Lisa Ling, Elaine Chao, Joe Bae (KKR), Manny Maceda, Abigail Hing Wen, Ashley Liao, Dan Tani, Janet Yang, Tiffany Chang, Bing Chen, Guy Kawasaki, Mayor Aftab Pureval, Charles Yu, Jenny Ming, and Deb Liu.

== Writings ==
Books

- Soon Yu, Dave Birss (May 24, 2022). Friction: Adding Value By Making People Work for It. ZenKarma Media. ISBN 979-8-9859672-1-0
- Soon Yu, Dave Birss (February 6, 2018). Iconic Advantage: Don't chase the new, innovate the old. Savio Republic. ISBN 978-1682615409
