= Victor Ho =

Victor Ho (Chinese: 何 翔) is a Taiwanese-American businessman, who was the co-founder and CEO of FiveStars, a customer loyalty network for small and medium businesses.

== Early life and career ==
Ho grew up in Southern California. His parents are immigrants from Taiwan. His father is an engineer and his mother an artist, both of whom met while working at Rockwell Automation.

After graduating from college, Ho started his career at Goldman Sachs. Next, he worked as a consultant at McKinsey & Company in New York.

Whilst at McKinsey, Ho interviewed for jobs at private equity firms. One day, while stuck at San Francisco airport from a flight delay, the idea of creating a company based on improving customer loyalty for local merchants occurred to him. He called prospective employers and told them he had changed his mind. In December 2010 Ho launched FiveStars with Matt Doka, whom he knew from working at McKinsey. In July, 2011 the company launched its product, a universal customer loyalty card called FiveStars and found early success. They proceeded to raise $16 million in venture financing to grow the company. By August 2013, Five Stars employed 100 people and has in excess of a million cardholders. By 2016, the company has raised $105M in funding from investors.
