= Jameson Hsu =

Taiwanese-American executive

Jameson Hsu is a Taiwanese-American executive who is the CEO and co-founder of Mochi Media, a technology company that builds tools and services for content developers and distributors. Prior to Mochi Media, Hsu co-founded the interactive advertising agency, WDDG.

== Education and career ==
Hsu graduated from Virginia Tech in 1997 with a B.S. in Management Science and Information Technology.

After college, he worked briefly as a management consultant for Price Waterhouse. In 1998, he co-established WDDG in New York City and held the position of managing director. While at WDDG he produced numerous advergames and award-winning advertising campaigns for companies such as HP, Kraft Foods, Altoids and Lego.

In 2005, he and Bob Ippolito founded Mochi Media, the world's largest online games advertising network. His focus for the past eight years has been on brand marketing and creating casual games.

=== 886 Studios ===
Hsu is a founding partner of 886 Studios, a Taipei-based venture firm. The firm operates 886 Launchpad, a startup accelerator that provides funding and mentorship to early-stage companies.

== Personal life ==
Hsu grew up on the East Coast and now lives in San Francisco.
