= Bing Yeh =

Bing Yeh (Chinese: 葉炳輝; pinyin: Yè Bǐnghuī; Wade–Giles: Yeh Ping-hui; born c. 1950) is a Taiwanese-American electrical engineer and business executive.

== Biography ==
Yeh was born in Taiwan and came to the United States in 1976. He received his B.S. and M.S. degrees in physics from National Taiwan University. He earned an engineering degree in at Stanford University and was a Ph.D. candidate in applied physics. From 1979 to 1981 Yeh worked at Intel as development engineer. From 1981 to 1984 he worked at Honeywell. In 1984 he became a development manager at Xicor. In 1989, Yeh co-founded Silicon Storage Technology, a technology company producing non-volatile memory devices and related products. For several years from 1996, SST was among Silicon Valley's 20 fastest-growing companies.

In April 2010, Yeh resigned as a director of the SST, and in the same year, he founded Greenliant Systems, a supplier of flash memory, solid state storage and controller products to industrial, networking, automotive, medical and consumer electronics companies. Greenliant is based in Santa Clara, California. He serves as chairman and chief executive officer.
