= Mochi Media =

Games network

- Screenshot of Mochi Media as of 24 July 2009
- Company type: Game publishing
- Available in: English
- Founded: 2005
- Dissolved: 2014
- Headquarters: San Francisco, {{{location_country}}}
- Founders: Jameson Hsu; Bob Ippolito
- Industry: Video game development
- Services: Advertising
- Website: https://mochimedia.com (Archived)
- Registration: Optional
- Current status: Offline

Mochi Media was a browser-based games network, with more than 140 million monthly active users and 15,000 games on nearly 40,000 publisher websites. Mochi Media's products included tools for Flash-based web developers to display in-game advertising, complete micro-transactions and display score boards in games. The company was headquartered in downtown San Francisco.

The company was founded in 2005. Mochi Media was dissolved by its parent company Shanda Games on 31 March 2014. All of its services were wound down, and final payments were paid to those eligible at the end of April 2014.

== Mochi API ==
MochiMedia offered an ActionScript API to developers so that they could implement advertisements, leaderboards, and in-game micro-transactions.

=== MochiAds ===
MochiAds was an advertisement application targeting specifically towards monetizing web browser games using the Flash Player platform.

Advertisements could be displayed as a game's pre-loader or as content inside the game itself.

=== Mochi Coins ===
In 2009, Mochi Media released a new system to access paid content in browser games called MochiCoins. The platform allowed developers to put additional content or features in the games, which users paid for with the MochiCoins in their account. These coins could be purchased through Mochi Media's website using credit cards, PayPal or SuperRewards.

On 17 September 2012, Mochi Media made an announcement that they would discontinue Mochicoins. Players could no longer purchase Mochicoins after 5 October, and on 15 October, Mochicoins was discontinued. MochiCoins could be traded in for Ninja Kiwi coins beginning on 15 October.

=== MochiSocial ===
MochiSocial allowed developers to send game data to social networking sites. These interactions included posting to a news stream, sending gifts to or inviting friends, and posting achievements. Players of a game could opt to become a "Fan" of a game developer. This allowed the player to receive updates from game developers on new games or content. Developers also got access to data from the social interactions within their games. They could choose to offer certain features of their games to registered users only, and hide them from guests.

=== MochiScores ===
MochiScores allowed developers to implement leaderboards into their game. Players could submit their score and compare their score with others around the world. Developers could choose between displaying a numerical value or a time, and could set the sorting criteria for a leaderboard. They could also implement achievements to the scoreboard based on a player's score.

=== Publishers ===
The Mochi Publisher program provided three ways for website publishers to earn income from free games that were distributed to them. Publishers were given access to a library of games, a revenue share from games and an API to customize content specific for certain games. An example is setting leaderboards to only display scores from a certain domain.

== Shutdown ==
Mochi Media parent company Shanda dissolved the Mochi Media business effective 31 March 2014. All services were shut down.
