= Tien Tzuo =

- Born: 1968 (age 57–58); Taiwan
- Education: Cornell University (BS); Stanford University (MBA)
- Occupations: Co-founder, chairman & CEO, Zuora
- Years active: 1990–present
- Spouse: Mariana Tzuo
- Children: 1

Tien Tzuo (born 1968) is a Taiwanese-American tech entrepreneur. He is the founder, chairman, and CEO of Zuora, and prior to that was chief strategy officer of Salesforce.

== Early life and education ==
Tzuo was born in Taiwan, and when he was 3 years old his family moved to the Flatbush section of Brooklyn. His parents were psychology professors, and his father also worked as an importer-exporter and in real estate.

Tzuo graduated from Hunter College High School in 1986, earned a bachelor's degree in electrical engineering at Cornell University, worked at Oracle Corporation in Manhattan for six years, and then earned his Master of Business Administration (MBA) from the Stanford University Graduate School Of Business.

== Salesforce ==
He worked for about a year at enterprise software company CrossWorlds. In 1999, he was hired at cloud computing company Salesforce as its eleventh employee. He worked there for nine years and would become Salesforce's first chief marketing officer and then chief strategy officer.

== Zuora ==
In 2007, Tzuo left Salesforce to launch Zuora as its founding CEO. The California-based enterprise software company creates and provides subscription management software to help other companies with their subscription-based services. Within a few weeks of its initial public offering on April 12, 2018, Zuora was valued at over $2 billion, and Tzuo's 10% stake in the company was worth an estimated $193 million.

Tzuo's book Subscribed: Why the Subscription Model Will Be Your Company's Future - and What to Do About It, written with Gabe Weisert, was published by Portfolio on June 5, 2018.
