= Indian Americans in the San Francisco Bay Area =

The San Francisco Bay Area has the second-largest Indian-American population in the United States after the New York metropolitan area. The Bay Area Asian Indian population is primarily concentrated in the Santa Clara Valley, with San Jose having the highest population of Asian Indians in raw numbers as 2010, while Cupertino, Dublin, Fremont, Pleasanton and San Ramon have the largest concentrations. The South Bay-based 17th congressional district, represented by Indian-American Ro Khanna has the largest Asian Indian population of any congressional district in the United States. In 2010, Indian-Americans were the fastest growing minority population in the Bay Area. The Indian population in the city of San Francisco itself is still small compared to other Asian groups, but grew by 109% during the 2010s.

== History ==
=== Early history ===
The San Francisco Bay Area has long been one the main centers of immigration from the Indian subcontinent, with many Indian immigrants, mainly from Punjab entering San Francisco in the early 20th century. It is estimated that about 3,000 people from India entered through the Angel Island Immigration Station before the Immigration Act of 1917 barred immigrations from the Asia-Pacific region. During this period, the vast majority of Indian immigrants entering the country were Punjabi Sikhs, making up an estimated 85-90% of the Indian immigrant population., with many of them immigrating due to the similarities of the California landscape to that of their native northwestern Punjab. The greatest flow of Indian-Americans to California prior to the 1917 restriction would occur from 1907 to 1911, once more Indians started choosing to immigrate to California over fellow British colony Canada due to stories of harsh conditions in the latter country. From San Francisco, many Sikhs would then go to the Sacramento Valley and take up jobs as farmers. This early 20th century influx of Indians into California, happening at the same time as larger migrations from East Asia led to heightened exclusionary sentiment from whites in San Francisco, most prominently the Asiatic Exclusion League. Most of these migrants would settle in the Central Valley, but they would establish a Bay Area presence in Berkeley and outer parts of the area such as Oakley. By 1911, this short burst of Indian immigration would already start leveling off.

Indians based in San Francisco played a role in the Indian independence movement, with a group of San Francisco-based labors creating the Hindustan Gadar Party in 1913, publishing the internationally distributed newspaper Gadar from the city. During the first half of the 20th century, many Indians came to study at the University of California, Berkeley, including independence movement leader Jayaprakash Narayan.

=== Contemporary era ===
Despite these arrivals, manifestations of Indian culture were still relatively rare in the Bay Area, with San Francisco only having three Indian restaurants in 1965, with one of them being run by a British immigrant couple. Restaurants were normally staffed by Indian and Pakistani graduate students. Indians, particularly Guajarati Patels, started to gain a foothold in owning San Francisco's SROs and hotels, with the Ford Hotel on 6th Street in the Tenderloin being the first Patel-owned hotel in the United States and the Patel ownership of hotels expanding throughout the 1950s and 1960s as more immigrants entered due to the Luce-Celler Act increasing the quota of Indians allowed into the U.S.

Mass Indian migration into the Bay Area would restart after the passage of the Hart–Celler Act in 1965, which removed the quota system of immigration. The change in the immigration system also coincided with quick growth of the American high technology industry in Silicon Valley. The combination of these two events would lead to a massive surge of Asian immigrants in the Bay Area - Silicon Valley companies would create 175,000 jobs between 1975 and 1990, while the Bay Area's foreign-born population would double in that same time period to 350,000. By 1993, 23% of the foreign-born engineers in the Bay Area were Indians and 87% of the Indians working in Silicon Valley had arrived only since 1970. This workforce was also highly educated, with 55% of Indian engineers having a graduate degree.

Migration by tech workers started to increase in particular in the 1970s after many small computer companies were founded in India due to a decision by IBM to unbundle its computer hardware, mainframe operating system and applications software lines. Because of strict rules against joint ventures and high trade barriers, Indian firms started to send engineers to partner with American companies in lieu of join ventures. Tech worker migration would accelerate in the 1990s, with the Y2K scare in particular leading tech companies to hire low-cost engineers from India.

== Culture ==
=== Music ===
Tech workers are not the only Indians migrating to the Bay Area. In 1967, Hindustani classical musician Ali Akbar Khan established the first US location of the Ali Akbar College of Music in Berkeley. Later relocated to San Rafael, the college would become a center of a broader Hindustani classical music scene in the Bay Area, with artists such as Zakir Hussain and Chitresh Das basing themselves there.

=== Sports ===
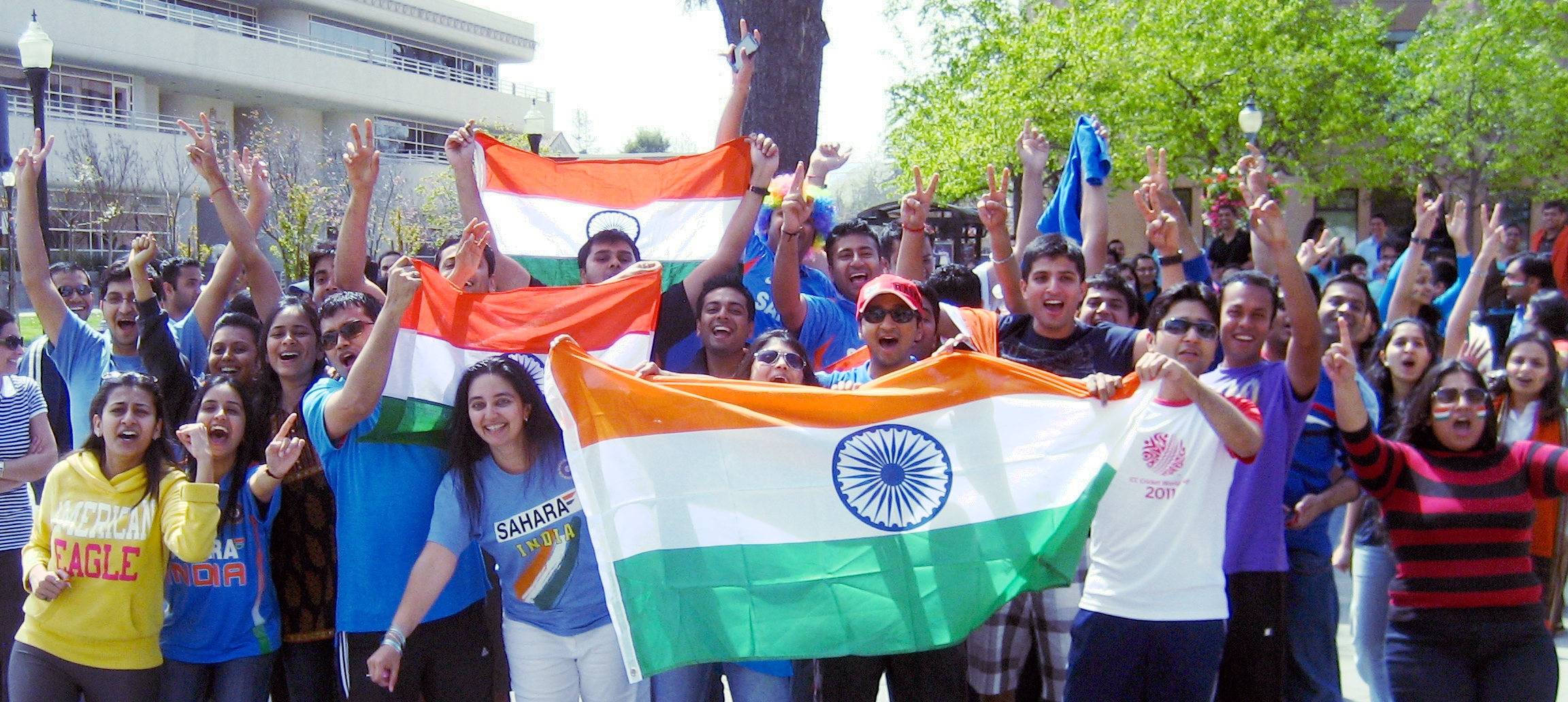
Diaspora in the Bay Area celebrating Indian cricket team's 2011 World Cup victory

Cricket in the region is mostly followed by South Asians, with the Bay Area represented by the San Francisco Unicorns in Major League Cricket.

== Notable Indian-Americans from the San Francisco Bay Area ==
- Avantika Vandanapu, actress
- Parag Agrawal, former CEO of Twitter
- Aneesh Chaganty, film director
- Chitresh Das, musician
- Kamala Harris, Vice President of the United States
- Maya Harris, executive director of the ACLU of Northern California and sister of Kamala Harris
- Ro Khanna, U.S. Representative from California's 17th congressional district
- Ali Akbar Khan, musician
- Vinod Khosla, co-founder of Sun Microsystems and founder of Khosla Ventures
- Narinder Singh Kapany, physicist, invented fiber optics
- Neal Mohan, CEO of YouTube
- Bharati Mukherjee, novelist
- Shantanu Narayen, CEO, chairman and president of Adobe Inc.
- Sundar Pichai, CEO of Alphabet Inc. and Google
- Shefali Razdan Duggal, Ambassador of the United States to the Netherlands
- Dalip Singh Saund, first Asian American U.S. representative, studied at UC Berkeley
- Zakir Hussain, musician
- Savita Vaidhyanathan, former mayor of Cupertino
- Ashwini Bhave, Bollywood and Marathi Actress
