= Zuora =

American enterprise software company

Zuora, Inc.

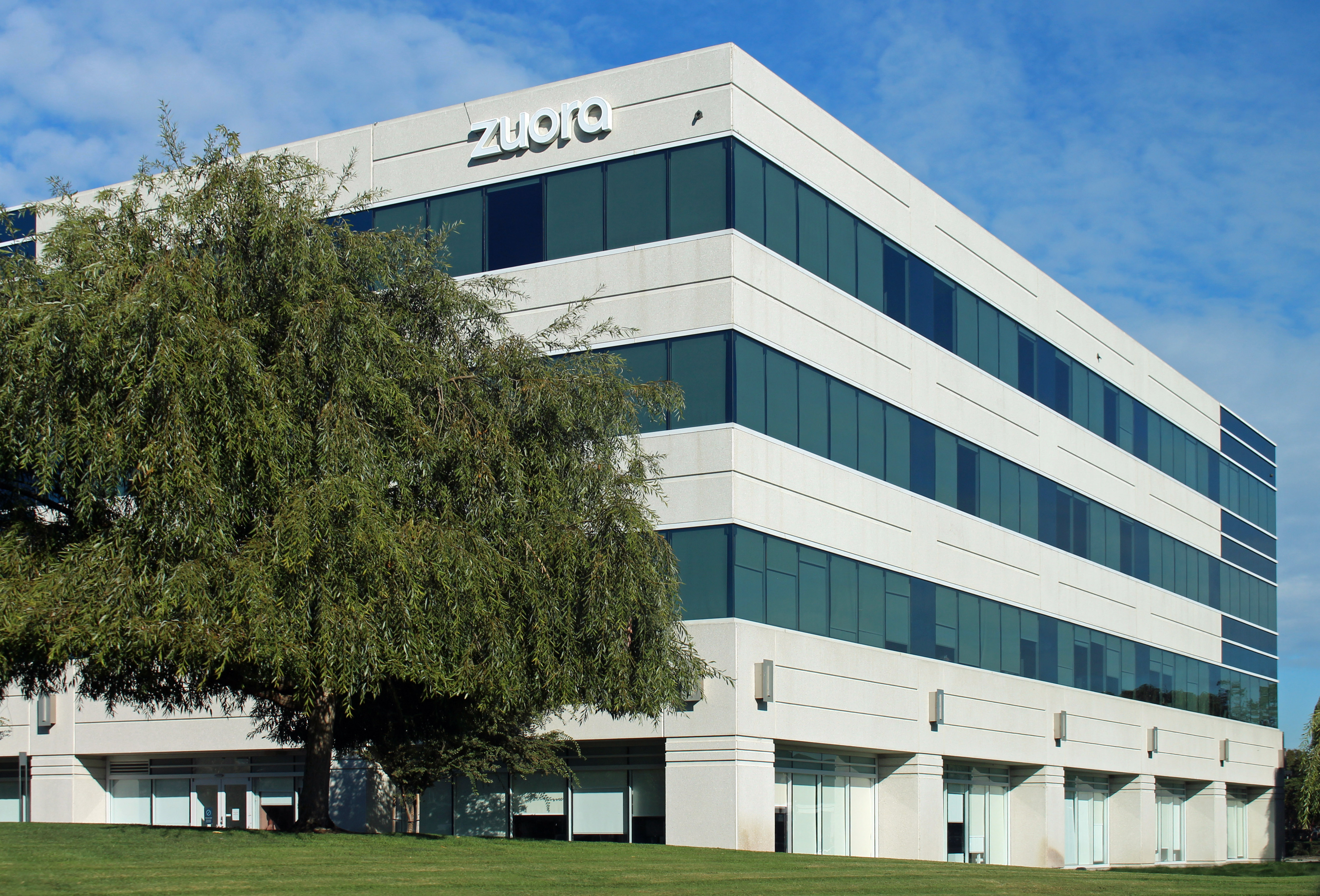
- Headquarters in Redwood City
- Type: Private
- Traded as: NYSE: ZUO (2018–2025)
- Industry: Enterprise software
- Founded: 2007; 19 years ago
- Founders: K.V. Rao; Cheng Zou; Tien Tzuo
- Headquarters: Redwood City, California, U.S.
- Key people: Tien Tzuo (CEO); Todd McElhatton (CFO)
- Revenue: ▲US$396 million (2023)
- Operating income: ▼US$−187 million (2023)
- Net income: ▼US$−198 million (2023)
- Total assets: ▲US$669 million (2023)
- Total equity: ▼US$97.2 million (2023)
- Owners: Silver Lake (2025–present); GIC (2025–present)
- Number of employees: 1,618 (2024)
- Website: zuora.com
- Footnotes; Financials as of January 31, 2023

Zuora, Inc. is an American enterprise software company headquartered in Redwood City, California that creates and provides software for businesses to launch and manage their subscription-based services. Its applications are designed to automate recurring billing, collections, quoting, revenue recognition, and subscription metrics.

Since 2025, it is owned by American private equity firm Silver Lake together with Singaporean sovereign wealth fund GIC. Tien Tzuo, a co-founder of the company, has served as its CEO since 2007.

== History ==
=== Launch and IPO ===
In 2007, K.V. Rao and Cheng Zou (engineers at WebEx) and Tien Tzuo (an early executive at Salesforce) founded Zuora. The name of the company derives from a combination of their three surnames. The concept behind the company was a cloud-based billings platform to alleviate the need for online businesses to develop their own billing systems.

On 16 March 2018, the company filed for an initial public offering. On 12 April 2018, Zuora listed in NYSE under the ticker symbol ZUO. The company generated $154 million in the offering, and entered the market as a public company at a $1.4 billion valuation. By the end of April 2018, the company was valued at over $2 billion.

In 2016, Zuora launched the Subscription Economy Index, which tracks revenue growth of subscription businesses, comparing the growth to sales benchmarks. The index is based on data from hundreds of businesses on Zuora's platform. The index is updated twice a year.

Zuora hosts a conference series called Subscribed, covering topics related to the subscription economy and taking place in various cities each year. The Subscribed Institute, a think tank for subscription-based companies, was founded by Amy Konary and launched in 2018.

In 2019, Zuora hired former LogMeIn executive Chris Battles as its chief product officer, and former Adobe executive Robbie Traube as chief revenue officer. In June 2020, Zuora hired Todd McElhatton, formerly of SAP, as its new chief financial officer.

Zuora won the 2017 CODiE Award for Best Subscription Management Solution, and the 2020 CODiE Award for Best Subscription Billing Solution. Zuora received a 2020 Bronze Stevie Award for Customer Service.

=== Acquisitions and partnerships ===
On 20 May 2015, Zuora acquired Frontleaf and launched Z-Insights, combining information from its subscriber invoicing and billing platform with customer usage information. In 2017, Zuora purchased Leeyo Software, a revenue recognition platform.

Zuora partners with companies including Deloitte, Accenture, and PwC. In 2020, Zuora announced an expanded integration with GoCardless, to help companies in North America, Europe, the UK, Australia, and New Zealand to process recurring payments faster and reduce payment-related costs.

In August 2022, Zuora reached an agreement to acquire Zephr, a subscription experience platform, for $44 million in cash.

=== Funding ===
On 17 December 2007, Zuora announced it had raised $6 million in Series A funding. Zuora announced $15 million in Series B funding on 15 September 2008; $20 million in Series C funding in October 2010; $36 million in Series D funding on 4 November 2011; $50 million in Series E funding on 5 September 2013; and $115 million in Series F funding on 11 March 2015, bringing its total funding to $250 million. Investors include Benchmark Capital, Greylock Partners, Redpoint Ventures, Index Ventures, Shasta Ventures, Vulcan Capital, and Next World Capital. Private investors include founder and CEO of Salesforce Marc Benioff and former PeopleSoft vice-chair and founder and co-CEO of Workday, Dave Duffield.

=== Takeover ===
In October 2024, American private equity firm Silver Lake together with Singaporean sovereign wealth fund GIC agreed to take Zuora private in an all-cash deal valued at $1.7 billion. The acquisition was completed in February 2025.

== Products ==
Zuora sells a subscription management SaaS platform for businesses utilizing a subscription-service model. The Zuora Central platform lets companies keep track of subscription payments, billing, collections, pricing, product catalogs, and accounting. In addition to Zuora Central, Zuora's four primary SaaS applications are Zuora Billing, for recurring billing operations; Zuora Revenue, for revenue recognition; Zuora CPQ, sales quoting for subscription businesses; and Zuora Collect, for payment collections. Zuora's app marketplace, Zuora Connect, allows partners to develop and list apps built on the Zuora Central platform. In May 2020, a new version of the Zuora Central platform was released, with pre-built workflows, a new data query feature enabling faster access to live distributed data, an audit trail feature, and a new Zuora Central Sandbox tool to test and deploy new features.

On 5 June 2018, Zuora announced Subscription Order Management, designed to help customers process renewals and more complex deals. It addresses the shift from subscription growth related to acquiring new customers to growth from existing customers. In June 2019, at its Subscribed San Francisco conference, the company announced the Zuora Central Developer Platform, allowing developers to integrate Zuora's services with external services. It was introduced in early 2020.

In 2021, Real-Time Revenue was released, allowing businesses to automate the process of reconciling and analyzing their revenue and more accurately close their books.

On February 14, 2025, Silver Lake, in partnership with GIC, completed its acquisition of Zuora for $10.00 per share in cash, valuing the company at $1.7 billion. Zuora's common stock was delisted from the New York Stock Exchange. Founder and CEO Tien Tzuo rolled over a majority of his ownership stake.
