= Taiwanese Americans =

Americans of Taiwanese birth or descent

臺灣裔美國人 (Chinese)
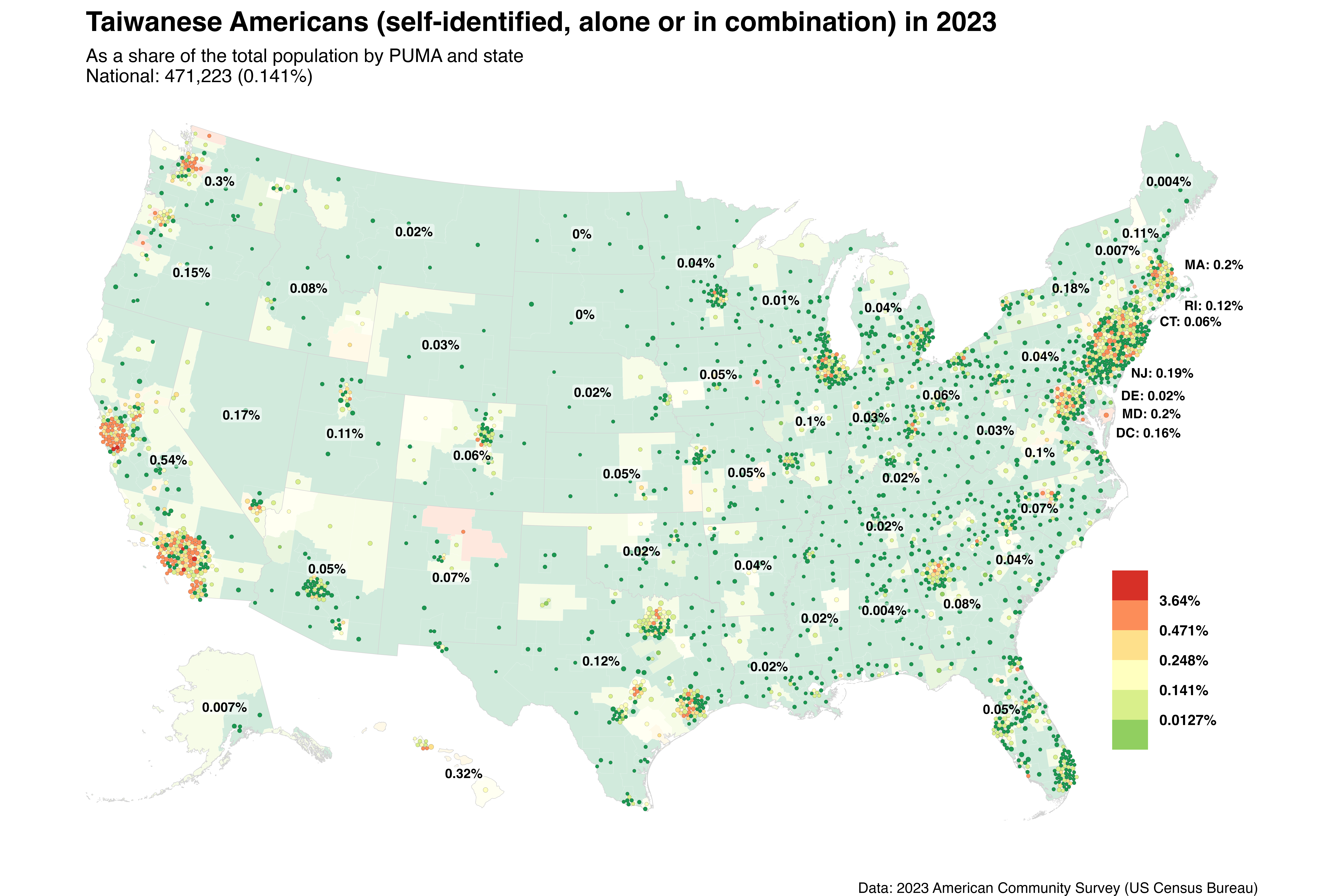
- Americans with Taiwanese ancestry by PUMA and state

Total population
- 331,224 (2023) (Note: U.S. Census estimate based on self-reported ethnicity) (by ancestry or ethnic origin); 392,012 (2023) (born in Taiwan); Range: 195,000 – 900,595; 0.06%–0.3% of the U.S. population (2017)

Regions with significant populations
- Los Angeles metropolitan area, New York City metropolitan area, San Francisco Bay Area, Greater Boston, Philadelphia metropolitan area, Baltimore–Washington metropolitan area, Seattle metropolitan area, Chicago metropolitan area, Greater Houston, Miami metropolitan area, Las Vegas Valley.

Languages
- English, Taiwanese Mandarin, Taiwanese Hokkien, Taiwanese Hakka, Formosan languages

Religion
- Christianity, Taiwanese folk (Confucianism, Taoism, Buddhism)

Related ethnic groups
- Overseas Taiwanese, Chinese Americans

Taiwanese Americans (Chinese: 臺灣裔美國人; pinyin: Táiwān yì měiguó rén; Pe̍h-ōe-jī: Tâi-Bí-jîn) are Americans of Taiwanese ancestry, including American-born descendants of migrants from the Republic of China (ROC). A 2008 survey by the Taiwanese government placed the Taiwanese American population at approximately 627,000.

Taiwanese Americans are the highest-earning American ethnic group by per capita income and have the highest educational attainment of any ethnic group in the United States. After World War II and the Chinese Civil War, immigrants from Taiwan first began to arrive in the United States, where Taiwanese immigration was shaped by the Hart-Celler Act (1965) and the Taiwan Relations Act (1979). As of the 2010 U.S. Census, 49% of Taiwanese Americans lived in either California, New York, or Texas.

Notable Taiwanese Americans include billionaire CEOs Jensen Huang (Nvidia), Lisa Su (AMD), and Morris Chang (TSMC); entrepreneurs Jerry Yang (co-founder of Yahoo), Steve Chen (co-founder of YouTube), Tony Hsieh (Zappos); politicians Michelle Wu, Andrew Yang, Lanhee Chen, and Elaine Chao; jurists Goodwin Liu, Florence Pan, and James Ho; HIV/AIDS researcher David Ho, chemist David R. Liu, and Nobel Prize laureates Samuel C. C. Ting and Yuan T. Lee. Taiwanese American celebrities include NBA basketball player Jeremy Lin, singer-songwriter Wang Leehom, and actress Constance Wu.

== Terminology ==
Taiwanese Americans are one of the newest Asian American ethnic groups in the United States. They encompass immigrants to the U.S. from the Republic of China (known as Taiwan), which is primarily located on the island of Formosa, and their American-born descendants. The country consists mostly of Chinese descendants from the provinces of Fujian and Guangdong and their Fujianese and Hakka subgroups (benshengren). As a result, the culture of Taiwan also shares many commonalities with Chinese culture which has often led to the categorization of Taiwanese Americans with Chinese Americans. Taiwanese immigrants, prior to 1982, were listed in the "China-born population" category in the United States census.

Together, immigrants from Taiwan, Hong Kong, and China constitute the three largest groups which form the Chinese American population, each with unique socioeconomic, cultural, and historical backgrounds. (Note: People of Chinese descent are referred to as huá qiáo (华侨) and huá rén (华人) in Chinese. According to the Pew Research Center, "A person of Taiwanese descent (tái wān rén, or 台湾人) may or may not identify with these Chinese diasporic concepts.") The term "Taiwanese American" may be considered a subgroup of "Chinese American", though multiple Taiwanese ethnic groups—i.e., Taiwanese indigenous peoples or Fujianese descendants from Zhangzhou or Quanzhou—distinguish themselves from mainland China, and the experience of Taiwanese immigrants differ from that of other Chinese immigrant groups.

The identity of being Taiwanese among both immigrants and descendants in the U.S. has multiple dimensions and has changed over time. Since the leaders, social elites, and affiliates of the nationalist Republic of China (1912–1949), under its Kuomintang government, moved to Taiwan in 1949, Taiwanese Americans also include these mainland Chinese migrants (known as waishengren). The group is more closely associated with China and may also identify as Chinese immigrants or Chinese Americans. However, Taiwanese Americans who consider Taiwan to be independent from China favor a separate political and cultural identity and have lobbied to be counted as a distinct population in the United States census. (Note: The 2000 U.S. Census recorded 144,795 self-identified Taiwanese residents in the U.S., a number that multiple Taiwanese groups criticized as inaccurate and underrepresentative. As a result, Taiwanese political organizations and student organizations campaigned in the 2010 United States census for the option to write in "Taiwanese".)

== History ==
The first Taiwanese immigrants to the United States arrived in the late 19th century. However, significant immigration from the island to the U.S. only began in the mid-20th century, when Taiwanese migrants traveled to the U.S. in search of educational opportunities either on the West Coast or East Coast, particularly in scientific fields. After the end of World War II, the Communist victory in the Chinese Civil War forced the nationalist Kuomintang government to retreat to Taiwan in 1949. American aid to Taiwan in the wake of the Korean War (1950–1953) supported the Kuomintang government and culminated in the 1954 Mutual Defense Treaty between the United States and the Republic of China, which precipitated a small influx of Taiwanese immigrants to come to the United States.

From 1949 up until 1979, the United States recognized the Kuomintang-led ROC as the sole legitimate government of China. As a result, immigration from Taiwan was counted under within the same quota for both mainland China and Taiwan. However, because the People's Republic of China (PRC) banned emigration to the United States until 1977, the quota for immigrants from China was almost exclusively filled by immigrants from Taiwan. In 1979, the United States broke diplomatic relations with the ROC, while the Taiwan Relations Act gave Taiwan a separate immigration quota from that of the PRC.

Before the late 1960s, immigrants from Taiwan to the United States tended to be "mainland Chinese" who had immigrated to Taiwan with the Kuomintang (KMT) after the Chinese Civil War. Later immigrants tended to increasingly be Taiwanese benshengren, or Han Taiwanese whose ancestors had already lived in Taiwan before 1949. Taiwanese immigration to the United States began to subside in the early 1980s due to improving economic and political conditions in Taiwan.

A wave of Taiwanese investment in the 2020s especially around the TSMC Arizona megaproject brought with it a surge of Taiwanese moving to the US for temporary or permanent work in support of these projects. In 2024 a record 137,000 Taiwanese went overseas to work in the United States.

== Socioeconomics ==
=== Education ===
One Taiwanese American mother explained in a recent study, “the child’s personal academic achievement is the value and honor of the whole family....If you do good, you bring honor to the family and [do] not lose face. A lot of value is placed on the child to do well for the family. It starts from kindergarten.”

When asked open-endedly in a recent study what makes children do well in school, almost a third of Taiwanese American mothers—compared with zero white American mothers—brought up family honor.

— Law professors Amy Chua and Jed Rubenfeld, The Triple Package (2014)

Taiwanese Americans are the most educated ethnic group in the United States. Both Taiwanese immigrant men and women in the U.S. consist primarily of professionals with high income and high educational attainment. Largely influenced by traditional Confucian beliefs widespread in Taiwan, (Note: According to sociology professor Chien-Juh Gu of Western Michigan University: "Confucian teaching prioritizes education. Taiwanese children are expected to devote themselves to study from a young age, and parents are usually involved in their children’s education. Students must pass rigid entrance exams in order to attend high school, college, and graduate school, and the intense academic competition brings a great deal of pressure on the youth. Many teenagers spend most of their leisure time in private after-school programs that prepare them for exams.") Taiwanese American culture places great emphasis on education. According to a 2000 survey, children's education was considered by Taiwanese couples as a family's most important decision.

The main focus of the Taiwanese American family is the achievement of the highest level of education for children, who "are encouraged to study hard and attempt to attend outstanding universities and graduate schools". In addition to supporting extracurricular activities, Taiwanese American parents "support the development of musical skills over athletic skills [and support] engagement in social causes," with a large portion choosing to enroll their children in Chinese language schools that teach Chinese culture, history, martial arts, and Standard Chinese as opposed to Southern Min dialects such as Taiwanese Hokkien. Parents devote and invest themselves financially in youth education, especially for boys; a child's academic achievements are considered as collective achievements for the family as a whole.

In 2010, 73.7 percent of Taiwanese Americans had earned a bachelor's degree or higher, a percentage significantly higher compared to the American average of 17.6 percent. (Note: Estimates indicate that a disproportionate percentage of Taiwanese students attend elite universities despite constituting less than 0.5% of the U.S. population. Taiwanese Americans have the highest education attainment level in the United States, surpassing any other ethnic group in the country, according to U.S Census Bureau data released in 2010. According to the 2010 Labor Statistics from U.S. Census Bureau, 73.6% of all Taiwanese Americans have attained a bachelor's degree or higher. (Compared to 28.2% nationally and 49.9% for all Asian American groups). 80.0% of Taiwanese American men attained a bachelor's degree and 68.3% of Taiwanese American women attained a bachelor's degree. 39.1% of all Taiwanese in the United States possess a master's, doctorate or other professional degree, nearly four times the national average.) In the 2013 American Community Survey, over 94 percent of Taiwanese Americans had at least a high school degree or higher. As of 2018, in the Chicago metropolitan area, where more than 80 percent of the Taiwanese American population in the Midwestern United States resides, 97 percent of Taiwanese Americans aged 25 years or older had at least a high school diploma and 84 percent had gone on to earn a bachelor's degree or higher—the highest educational attainment of all other ethnic groups in the area. In 1990, 62 percent of immigrants from Taiwan to the U.S. completed at least four years of college, compared to 46 percent of Hong Kong Americans, 31 percent of immigrants from China, and 21 percent of non-Hispanic whites aged 25 to 64.

Educational Attainment in ACS 2019
Ethnicity	Bachelor's degree or higher	High school graduate or higher
Taiwanese	78.8%	95.7%
Indian	75.7%	92.7%
Pakistani	59.8%	89.4%
Korean	58.9%	93.3%
Chinese average	56.7%	84.1%
Vietnamese	55.8%	92.3%
Asian average	55.6%	87.8%
Japanese	53.7%	96.1%
Filipino	49.8%	93.5%
Non-Hispanic White	34.4%	90.4%
General US Population	33.1%	88.6%

=== Employment and income ===
Ethnicity	Avg income per capita
Ethnicity	As of 2023
Taiwanese	$83,811
Indian	$72,389
Japanese	$61,568
Chinese except Taiwanese	$61,289
Filipino	$47,819
Vietnamese	$40,037
Korean	$58,560
U.S. Population average	$43,313

Taiwanese Americans are the highest-earning ethnic group in the United States by per capita income and are one of the highest-earning American ethnic groups by household income. In 2010, approximately two-thirds of the adult employed Taiwanese American population worked as white-collar professionals and managers who were highly educated.

Many Taiwanese Americans are highly educated, salaried professionals whose work is largely self-directed in management, professional and related occupations such as engineering, medicine, investment banking, law, and academia. 66.2% of Taiwanese Americans work in many white collar professions compared to 35.9% for the general American population and 48.1% for Asian Americans. 71.3% of Taiwanese men and 60.4% of Taiwanese women work in management, professional, and related occupations. They also hold some of the lowest unemployment rates in the nation with a figure of 4.3% compared to a national rate of 6.9%. The unemployment rate among Taiwanese Americans is generally low at roughly 5 percent.

According to the 2009 U.S. census, Taiwanese American men had one of "the highest year-round, full-time median earnings" with a figure of $76,587, while Taiwanese American women had a median income of $51,307. Taiwanese Americans have one of the lowest poverty rates in the US, with a poverty rate of 9.5% compared to 11.3% for the general American population. Taiwanese immigrant men in 1999 earned an average annual income of $60,367 (equivalent to $116,670 in 2025), the highest of any foreign-born men in the U.S. at the time, and Taiwanese immigrant women earned $40,276 (equivalent to $77,841 in 2025) per year, roughly $10,000 more than the average for other foreign-born U.S. women at the time.

== Settlement ==
The majority of Taiwanese American communities were formed after 1965, following the Immigration and Nationality Act of 1965, and they have since experienced rapid growth. From 2000 to 2010, the Taiwanese American population increased 59 percent from 144,795 (2000) to 230,382 (2010). In 2013, 59 percent of Taiwanese Americans were between age 18 and age 64, 19 percent were from ages <1 to 17, and 9 percent were over the age of 65. The overall median age was 35. 68 percent of Taiwanese Americans in 2013 were born outside of the United States, of which 67 percent became naturalized U.S. citizens.

Immigration to the United States from Taiwan has remained substantial. 42,182 immigrant visas were issued to Taiwan from 2001 to 2010, and among those who received legal permanent residency in 2010, 2,090 (40%) were the immediate relatives of U.S. citizens.

In the late 1970s and early 1980s, Taiwanese emigrants were instrumental in the development of Monterey Park, California in Los Angeles – resulting in the moniker of "Little Taipei" – as well as Flushing, Queens, which generally reflected new investments and capital flowing from Taiwan into newer Taiwanese enclaves instead of traditional Chinatowns. Taiwanese Americans have also brought with them Taiwanese cuisine to the communities they have settled, which, possibly excluding bubble tea, is not generally well known or served outside these aforementioned Taiwanese immigrant enclaves.

While Monterey Park is no longer the largest Taiwanese community in Los Angeles today, Flushing remains the main Taiwanese cultural, commercial, and political center in New York City. In Los Angeles County, California, newer communities such as Rowland Heights, Hacienda Heights, Arcadia, San Marino, Diamond Bar, Walnut, San Gabriel, Temple City, are similar to "Little Taipei." However, many annual Taiwanese cultural events (especially during Taiwanese Heritage Week) are still held in Monterey Park. As an attempt to duplicate the Taiwanese success of Monterey Park in Houston, Texas, Taiwanese immigrant entrepreneurs established what is now widely considered as Houston's new Chinatown on Bellaire Boulevard in the mid-1980s.

The prestige and performance of particular school districts, as well as access to careers in high-tech firms, have played a significant part in influencing the settlement patterns of Taiwanese Americans. Areas with high concentrations of Taiwanese immigrants include the San Gabriel Valley (Greater Los Angeles), Santa Clara Valley (Cupertino, San Jose), East Bay (Dublin, Pleasanton, El Cerrito, Oakland), Los Angeles/Orange County border communities (Cerritos/Artesia), and Irvine in Central Orange County. Outside of California, there are also major Taiwanese concentrations in Flushing, Long Island City, and Forest Hills, all within Queens; Nassau County on Long Island; Jersey City and Hoboken in nearby New Jersey; Rockville, Maryland (northwest of Washington, D.C.); Sugar Land, Texas (near Houston), Plano, Texas (near Dallas); Bellevue, Washington (and adjacent areas) (part of the Greater Seattle Area's "Eastside" communities) and Chandler, Arizona. Additionally, the northeastern suburbs of the Atlanta, Georgia area has also received a significant influx of Taiwanese immigrant residents.

From the middle of the 1980s to the 1990s, large numbers of affluent Taiwanese Americans began moving out to upscale neighborhoods such as Cupertino, San Mateo, Palo Alto, Fremont, Newark, and Pleasanton in the Bay Area; San Marino, Arcadia, South Pasadena, and Temple City in Western San Gabriel Valley; Hacienda Heights, Rowland Heights, Walnut, and Diamond Bar in Eastern San Gabriel Valley; with immigrants from the People's Republic of China and Cantonese and Teochew (mostly from Vietnam) taking their place in Monterey Park, as well as Alhambra. Starting in the 2000s, highly educated Nassau County on Long Island east of New York City, as well as suburbs in northern and central New Jersey, have received a large influx of Taiwanese immigrants.

=== U.S. states by Taiwanese American population ===
State	Taiwanese-Americans (2024 ACS 5-year estimate)	% of state's total population (2020 Census)
Alabama	664	.000132
Alaska	193	.000263
Arizona	3,192	.000446
Arkansas	415	.000137
California	120,472	.003046
Colorado	2,562	.000443
Connecticut	1,329	.000368
Delaware	699	.000706
Florida	4,757	.000220
Georgia	3,972	.000370
Hawaii	1,457	.001001
Idaho	378	.000205
Illinois	7,832	.000611
Indiana	1,574	.000231
Iowa	550	.000172
Kansas	688	.000234
Kentucky	1,068	.000237
Louisiana	579	.000124
Maine	458	.000336
Maryland	5,463	.000884
Massachusetts	8,888	.001264
Michigan	3,473	.000344
Minnesota	1,691	.000296
Mississippi	246	.000083
Missouri	2,021	.000328
Montana	92	.000084
Nebraska	352	.000179
Nevada	2,372	.000764
New Hampshire	342	.000248
New Jersey	11,208	.001206
New Mexico	256	.000120
New York	20,758	.001027
North Carolina	3,049	.000292
North Dakota	68	.000087
Ohio	3,232	.000273
Oklahoma	654	.000165
Oregon	3,079	.000726
Pennsylvania	3,986	.000306
Rhode Island	438	.000399
South Carolina	961	.000187
South Dakota	4	.000005
Tennessee	949	.000137
Texas	21,530	.000738
Utah	1,263	.000386
Vermont	116	.000180
Virginia	5,079	.000588
Washington	13,488	.001750
West Virginia	77	.000042
Wisconsin	1,100	.000186
Wyoming	64	.000093

=== U.S. metropolitan areas with large Taiwanese American populations ===
Rank	Metro Area	Taiwanese-Americans Alone or in Combination (2024 ACS estimate)	% of metro population, 2025 estimates
1	Los Angeles Metropolitan Area	66,963	0.521%
2	New York Metropolitan Area	32,984	0.164%
3	San Francisco Bay Area	25,671	0.554%
4	Greater San Jose	22,343	1.126%
5	Seattle Metropolitan Area	14,293	0.343%
6	Greater Houston	10,506	0.133%
7	Washington Metropolitan Area	9,963	0.154%
8	Inland Empire	9,883	0.207%
9	Greater Boston	9,306	0.185%
10	Chicago Metropolitan Area	8,348	0.088%

== Organizations ==
The influx of Taiwanese immigrants during the 20th century contributed towards the establishment of multiple immigrant organizations which sponsored local meetings, cultural events, and conferences. The Taiwanese American Association, founded in the 1970s, was among the first organizations to provide a nationwide network of active local Taiwanese chapters in urban areas. Multiple early Taiwanese American organizations were dedicated to the Taiwanese independence movement and to advocacy of democratic reform, such as the Formosan Association for Public Affairs (FAPA), which is based in Washington D.C., and the Formosa Foundation, both of which were established with the aim of supporting Taiwanese political interests and to support the international recognition of Taiwan.

Other early organizations founded by Taiwanese Americans supported specific economic, cultural, or political interests, including the North American Taiwanese Professors Association (NATPA) founded in 1982, the North American Taiwanese Medical Association (NATMA) founded in 1984, the Taiwanese American Citizens League founded in 1985 (which has lobbied to count Taiwanese Americans as separate from Chinese Americans), and the North American Taiwanese Women's Association (NATWA) founded in 1988.

Organizations founded by, and dedicated to, second-generation Taiwanese Americans include Taiwanese American Professionals (TAP), the Intercollegiate Taiwanese American Students Association (ITASA), and the Junior Taiwanese American Student Association (JTASA), a high school student network. Universities that all house a student association dedicated to Taiwanese Americans include Harvard University, Princeton University, Yale University, Cornell University, Brown University, Johns Hopkins University, New York University, and the University of California, Berkeley. In addition, cities such as San Jose, California; Rosemead, California; San Diego, California; Seattle, Washington; Flushing, New York; and Houston, Texas, have "Taiwan Centers" which host Taiwanese cultural and recreational activities and sponsor programs for youth and seniors.

In 1986, Chaotian Temple from Taiwan has also established a branch temple known as Ma-Tsu Temple in San Francisco Chinatown with the support of Taiwanese American community.

=== Media ===
Taiwanese Americans also run several of North America's major Chinese-language newspapers, such as the World Journal based in Queens; and the Chicago Chinese News. However, these influential and highly circulated newspapers are not geared solely to Taiwanese immigrants, but also serve a broader Chinese-speaking immigrant readership. Pacific Journal is a weekly Taiwanese-run newspaper that is geared more exclusively toward Taiwanese readers.

Due to the significant Taiwanese American community, Taiwanese media dominates the Chinese-language airwaves in the United States. Cable and satellite television of Taiwan-based media keeps Taiwanese Americans abreast of news developments and programming in Taiwan. For example, satellite stations ETTV America and CTI cater to Mandarin-speaking Taiwanese immigrants.

== Taiwanese nationality and residency ==
Passport of Taiwan

Passport of the United States

In the 1960s, many Taiwanese Americans chose to make America their permanent home and had children in the U.S. Most sought refuge from the numerous arrests and executions during the White Terror era of the KMT, the political party which had dictatorially ruled the country. By the late 1970s, improving economic conditions in Taiwan slowed the rate of immigration. During the 1990s, political liberalization in Taiwan encouraged many who had left Taiwan to return.

Although the oath of naturalization of the United States contains a statement renouncing "allegiance and fidelity" to other countries, the Republic of China (the formal name of Taiwan) does not recognize this renunciation as sufficient for the termination of ROC nationality, and requires a person who wishes to renounce ROC nationality to take another oath before an ROC consular officer. All renunciations are subject to approval from the Ministry of the Interior, and the Ministry may deny a person's application under Taiwanese law. Without formal renunciation, the ROC government considers its emigrants with American citizenship to continue to be nationals of the ROC. Acquiring US citizenship has no effect on the holder's status as a national of ROC, which makes Taiwan-born Americans still eligible to vote in the ROC elections, provided that their household registration is still intact in Taiwan.

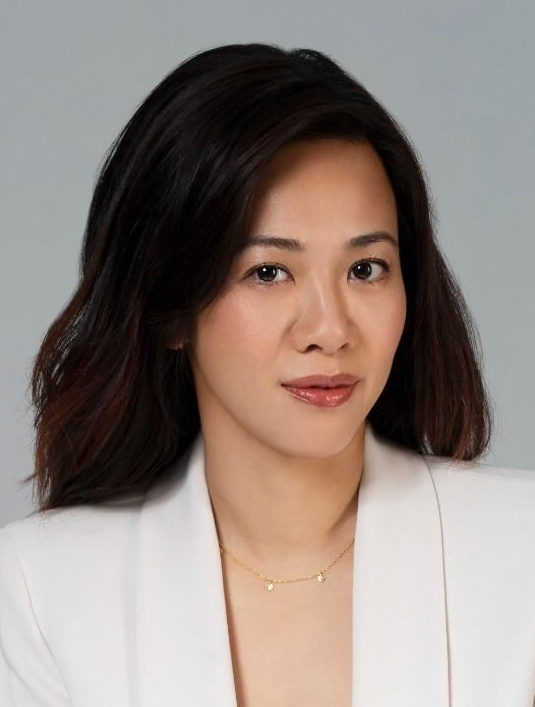
Cynthia Wu was born in the United States and returned to Taiwan to serve as a member of the Legislative Yuan.

Unlike their Taiwan-born parents, the American-born second generation do not have household registration in Taiwan at birth, making them nationals without household registration (NWOHRs), despite the fact that they are also ROC nationals under Taiwanese law. In contrast with those with household registration in Taiwan, NWOHRs cannot receive a Taiwanese National Identification Card, do not have right of abode in Taiwan, and are subject to immigration control while in Taiwan. They are, however, eligible for a Taiwan passport. It is possible for NWOHRs to be registered as nationals with household registration (NWHRs) if they meet the requirements listed under the Immigration Act of Taiwan.

== Connection to politics of Taiwan and cultural ties ==
Many Taiwanese Americans play an active role in the politics and culture of Taiwan, aided in large part by recognition of dual citizenship. According to The New York Times, Taiwanese Americans are "some of the most determined voters in the world" and several thousand travel back to Taiwan to vote in Taiwanese elections.

The identity politics of Taiwan also influences at least first generation Taiwanese Americans. Many government officials, including presidents Lai Ching-te, Tsai Ing-wen, Ma Ying-jeou, and Lee Teng-hui, have received graduate degrees in the United States. The United States was also a major destination for anti-KMT figures such as Peng Ming-min and Chai Trong-rong, where they were politically exiled. Others, including Nobel Prize laureate Yuan T. Lee were educated in the United States.

== Cuisine ==
Taiwanese immigrant restaurateurs were largely responsible for the shift of American Chinese food from Cantonese-focused cuisine to diverse cuisine featuring dishes from many regions in China. The immigration of Taiwanese chefs to the United States began in the 1950s. At the time, cooks in Taiwan were trained in traditional Chinese regional cooking as this fit the chosen identity of the KMT. Taiwanese restaurateurs changed the food landscape of many American cities, including New York City, and pioneered innovations such as picture menus and food delivery. Many of the immigrants to the United States during this period had been born in China and fled to Taiwan with the retreating KMT, particularly former residents of the Dachen Islands who had been evacuated in 1955.

Traditionally, Taiwanese food has been hard to differentiate from Chinese and Japanese food abroad, since many Taiwanese chefs cooked simplified or westernized versions of traditional Taiwanese, Japanese, or Chinese dishes. In 2018, there was a rapid growth in the number of authentic Taiwanese restaurants in New York City and across the country, which coincided with an increased interest in regional Chinese food and in Taiwan itself. Some object to the politically fraught inclusion of Taiwanese cuisine under the banner of regional Chinese food and point out that it is inaccurate.

Taiwanese American cuisine is emerging as a full cuisine in its own right. Myers + Chang in Boston was one of the first restaurants to explicitly describe their food as such. In 2018, James Beard Award-winning chef Stephanie Izard opened a Taiwanese snack/dessert shop in Chicago. Taiwanese cuisine has a significant presence in the San Francisco Bay Area. Most Taiwanese restaurants in the Bay Area are located in the suburbs. Increasing interest in authentic Taiwanese food is coming from ex-pats and second generation Taiwanese Americans.

Kato by Chef Jon Yao is a Michelin-starred restaurant serving Taiwanese food in Los Angeles.

=== Cookbooks ===
A Taiwanese American cookbook, First Generation, was published by Frankie Gaw in 2022. The book contains recipes from Gaw's childhood growing up in the American midwest.

In 2023, Cathy Erway published Win Son Presents: A Taiwanese American Cookbook in collaboration with Josh Ku and Trigg Brown.

== Notable Taiwanese Americans ==
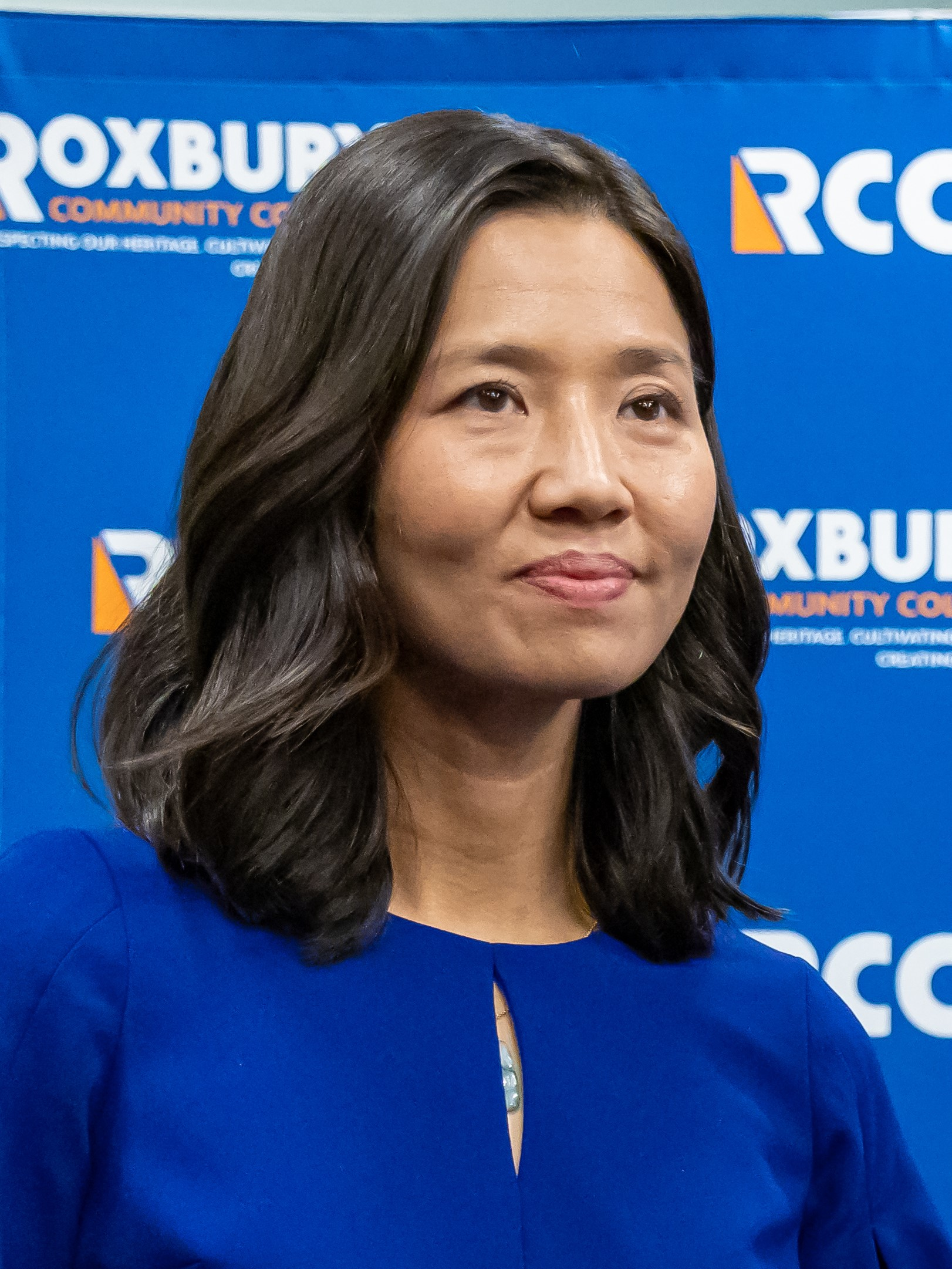
Michelle Wu
吳弭

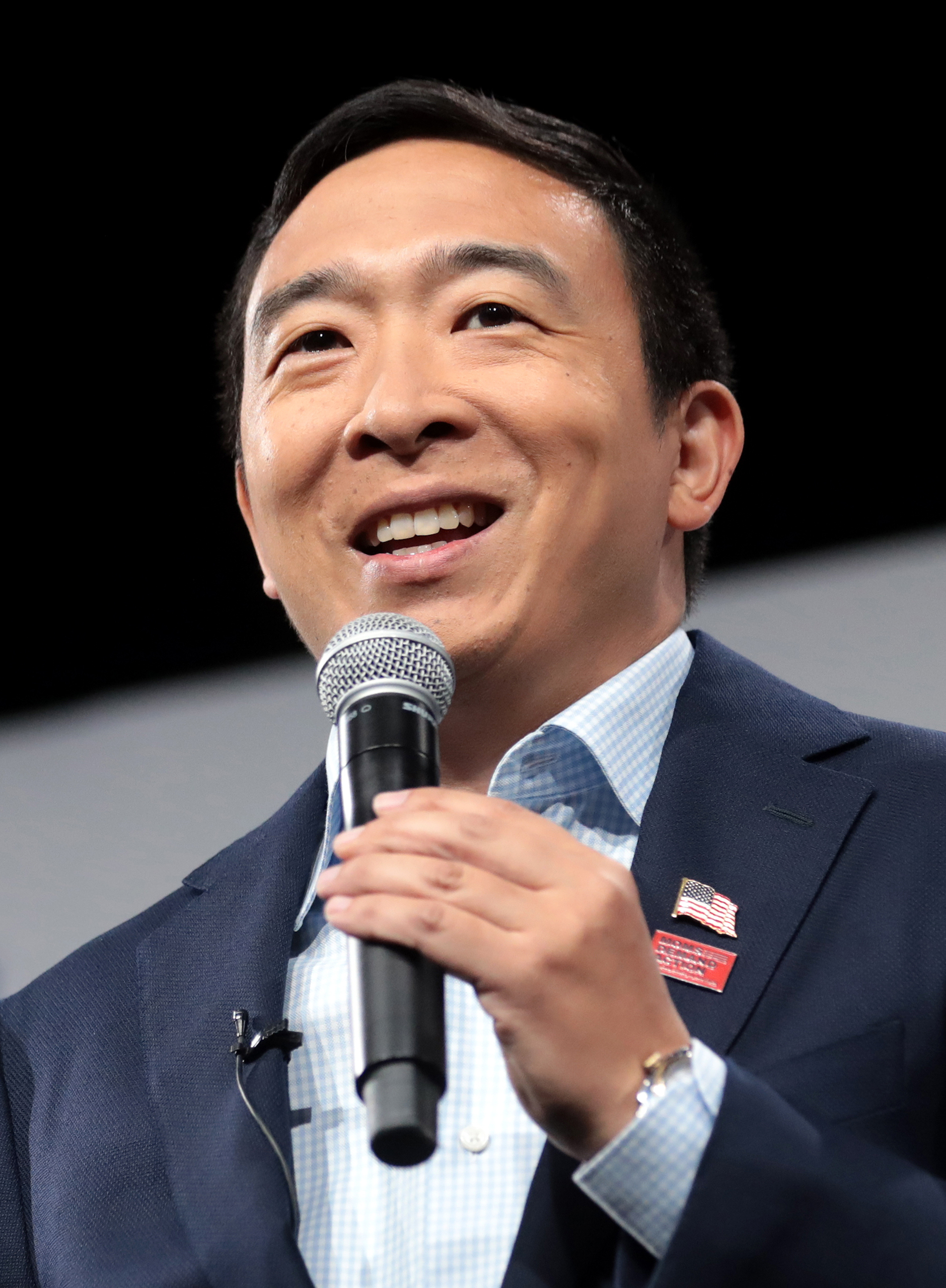
Andrew Yang
楊安澤

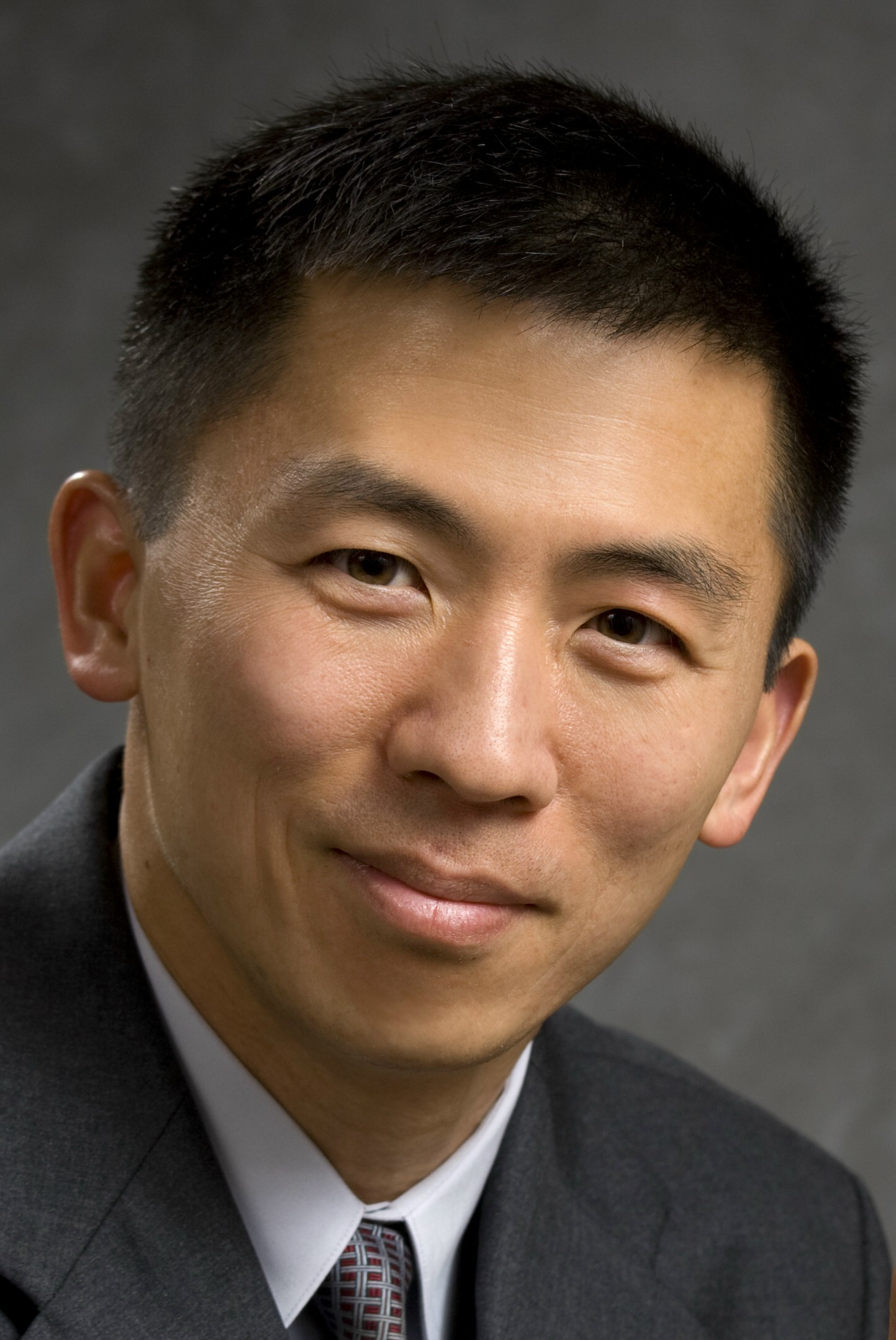
Goodwin Liu
劉弘威

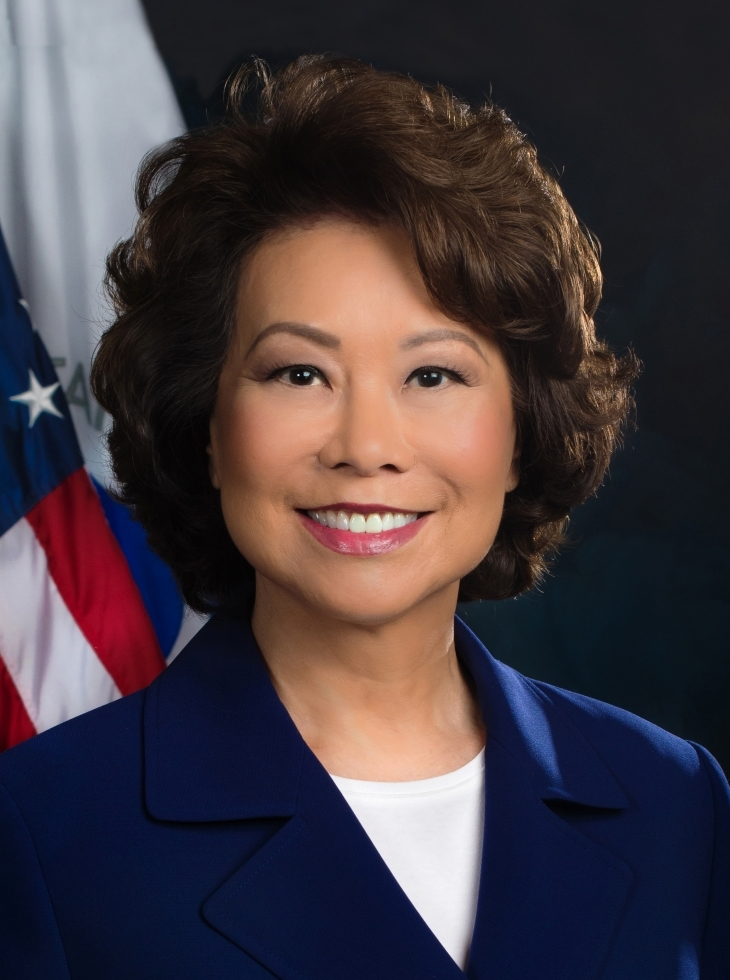
Elaine Chao
趙小蘭

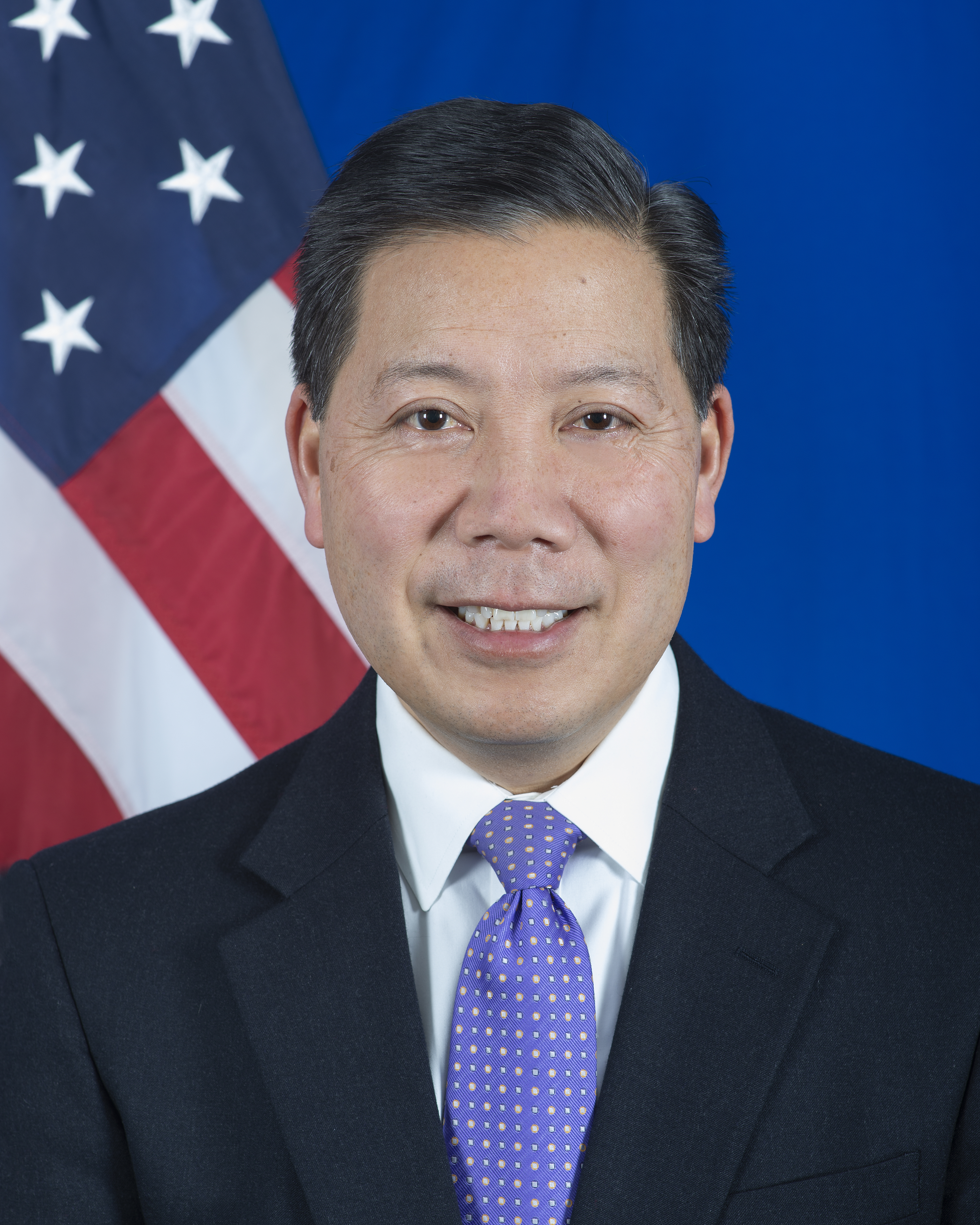
Chris Lu
盧沛寧

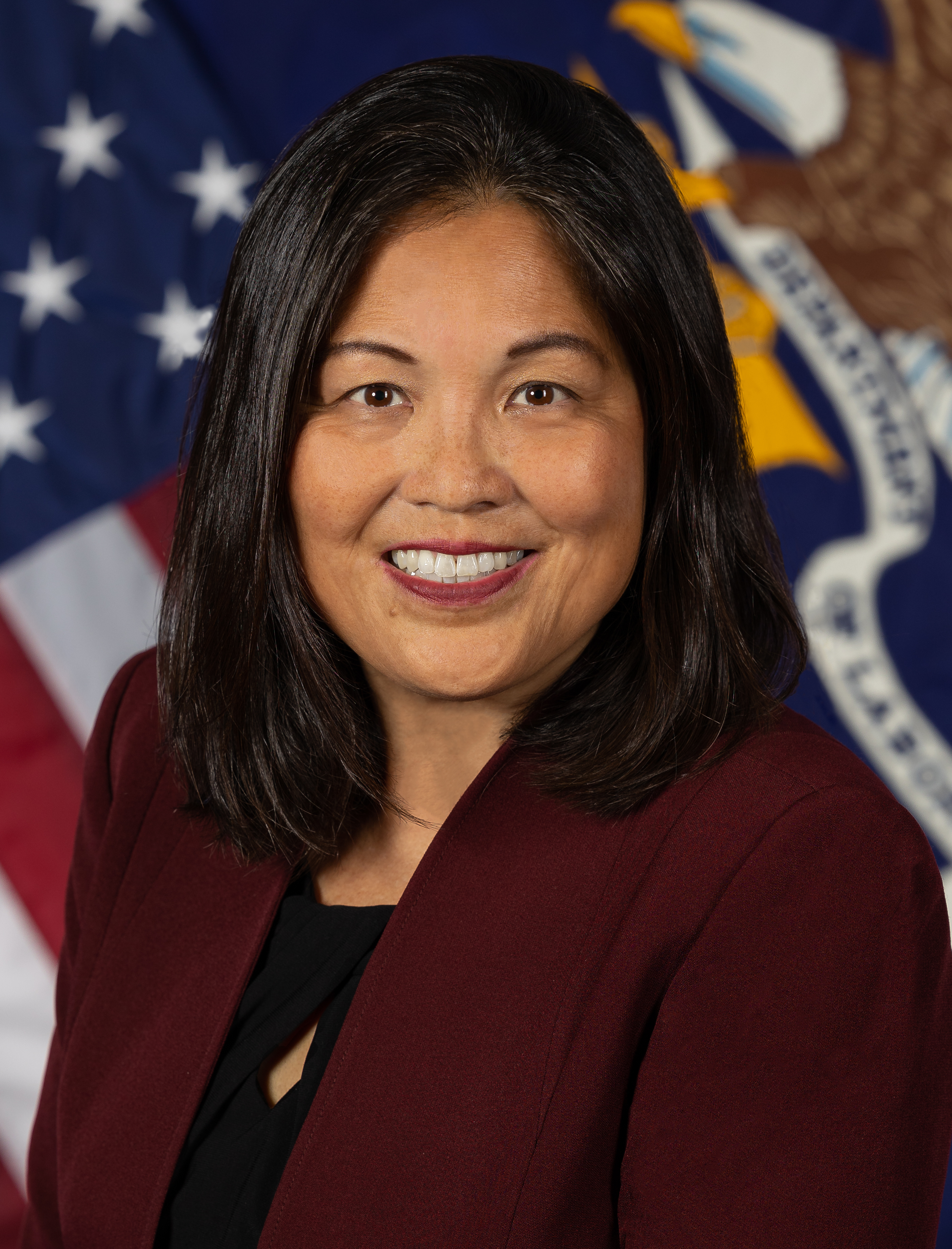
Julie Su
蘇維思

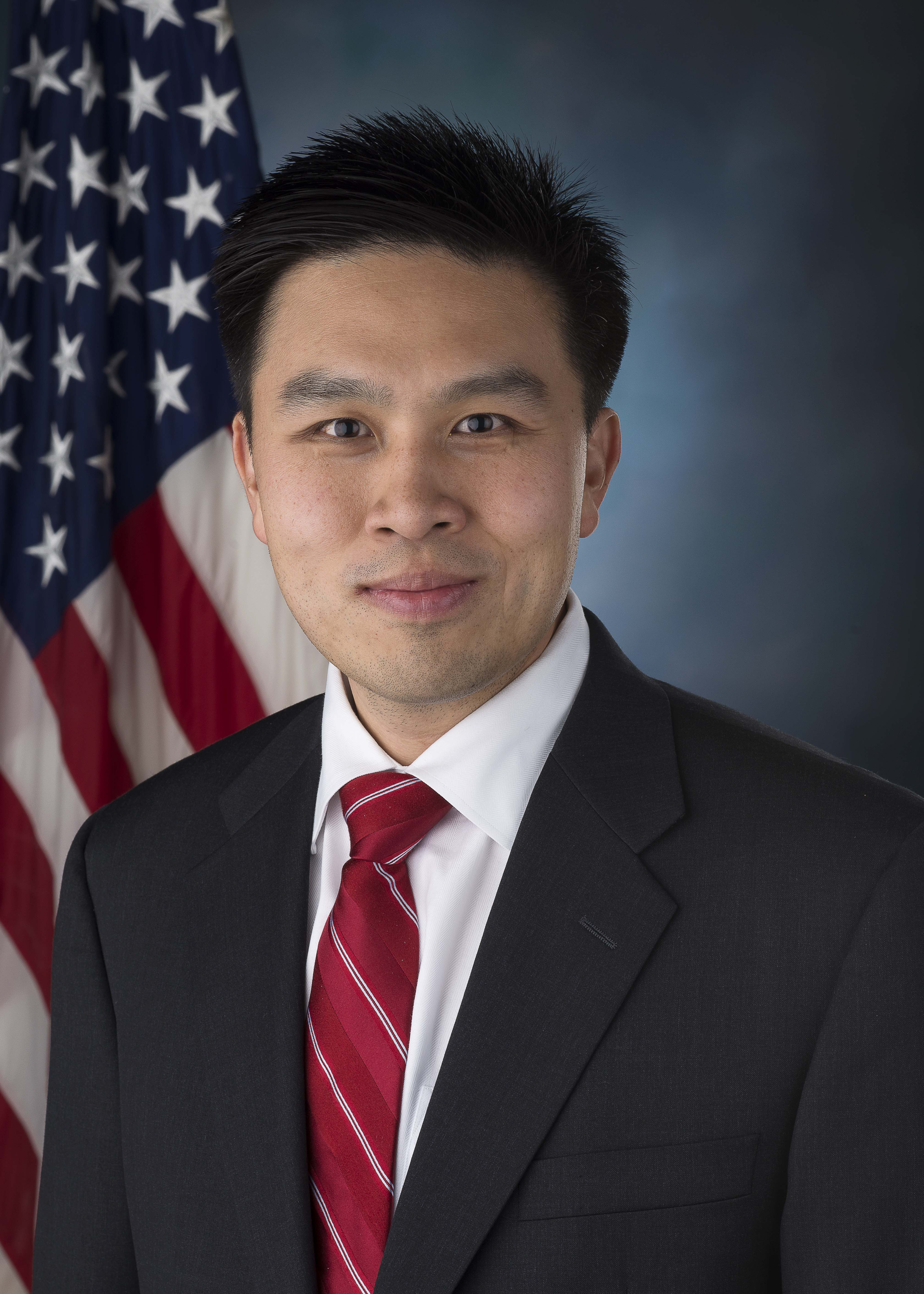
Lanhee Chen
陳仁宜

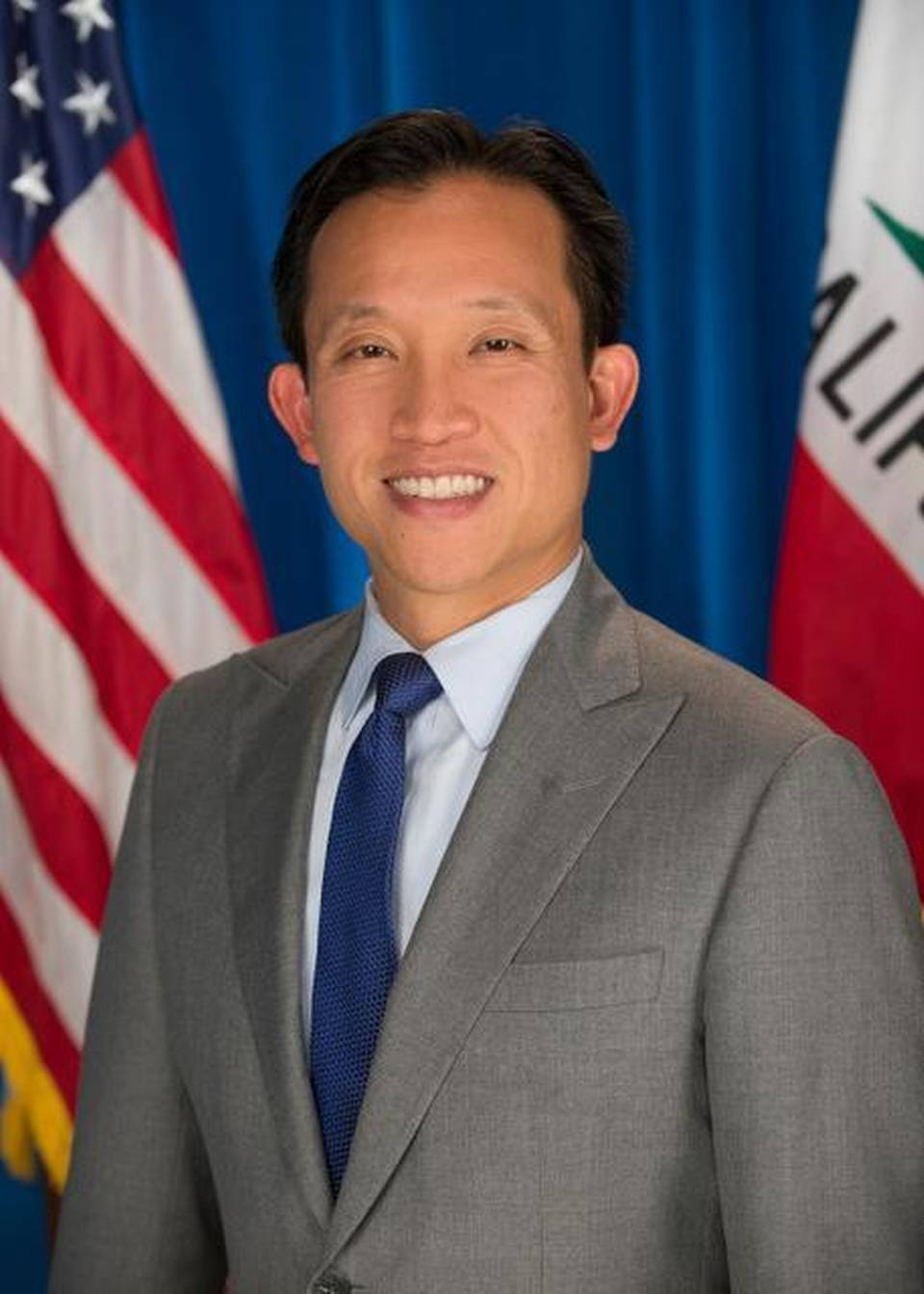
David Chiu
邱信福

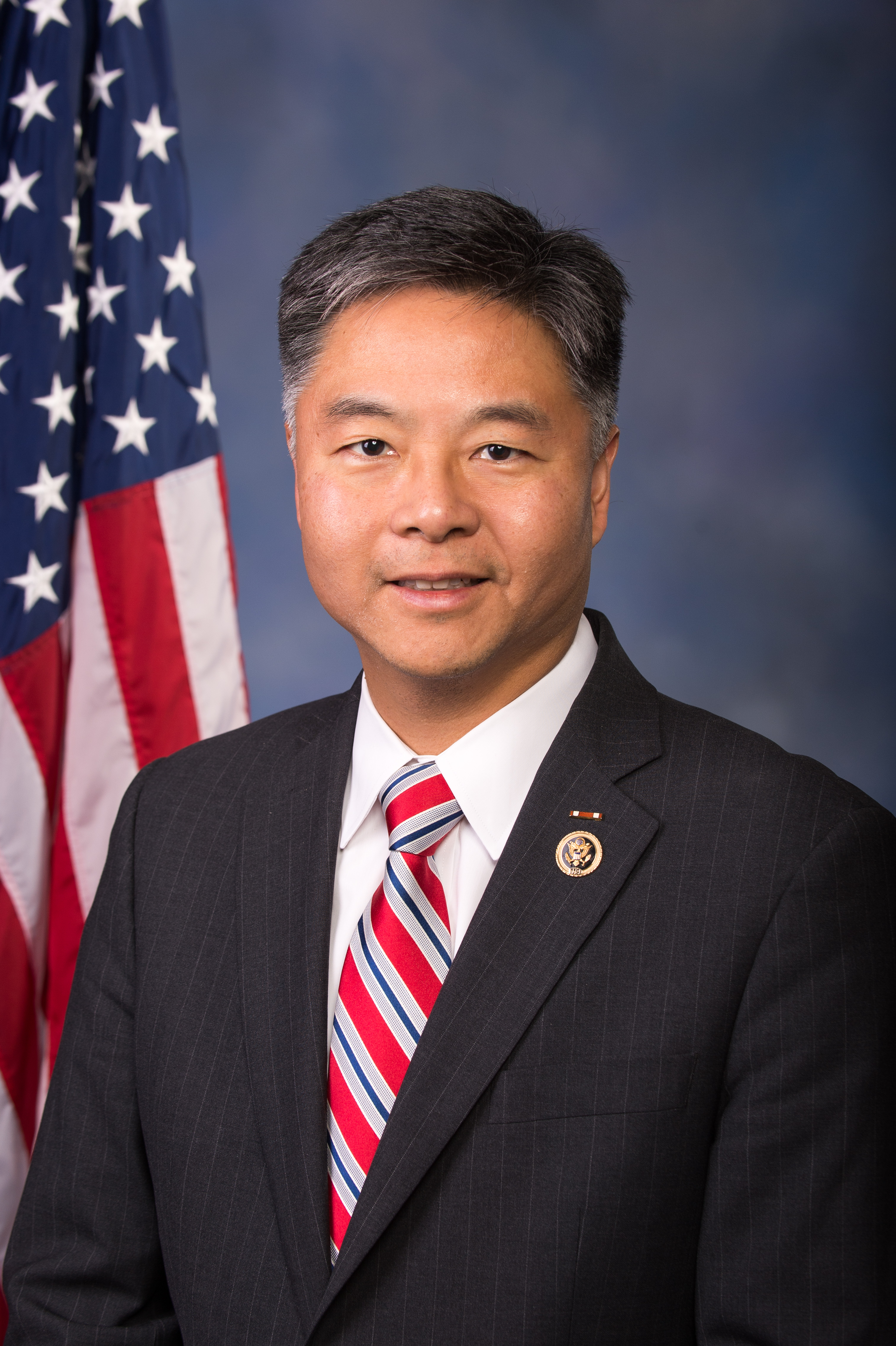
Ted Lieu
劉雲平

Politics and government
Name	Birthdate	Notability
Michelle Wu	1985	Mayor of Boston (D‑MA)
Elaine Chao	1953^{‡}	18th U.S. Secretary of Transportation (R‑NY)
Andrew Yang	1975	Co-Chair of the Forward Party
David Wu	1955^{‡}	U.S. Representative for Oregon (D‑OR)
Lanhee Chen	1978	Member of Amtrak and Social Security Board (R‑CA)
Katherine Tai	1974	19th United States Trade Representative (D‑CT)
Ted Lieu	1969	U.S. Representative from California (D‑CA)
David Chiu	1970^{‡}	City Attorney of San Francisco (D‑CA)
Grace Meng	1975	U.S. Representative from New York (D‑NY)
Chris Lu	1966	U.S. Deputy Secretary of Labor (D‑NJ)
Goodwin Liu	1970	Justice of the California Supreme Court
Florence Y. Pan	1966	Judge of the Court of Appeals for the D.C. Circuit
James C. Ho	1973^{‡}	Judge of the Court of Appeals for the Fifth Circuit
Julie Su	1969	Acting U.S. Secretary of Labor (D‑WI)
Portia Wu	1970	Secretary of the Maryland Department of Labor
Hsiao Bi-khim	1971 (Note: Born in Japan to a Taiwanese father and an American mother, Hsiao graduated from Oberlin College and Columbia University and held U.S. citizenship until 2002.)	13th Vice President of the Republic of China
Cynthia Wu	1978 (Note: Born in the United States, Wu graduated from Wellesley College and the Courtauld Institute of Art before renouncing her citizenship in 2014.)	Member of the Legislative Yuan
^{‡} Born in Taiwan

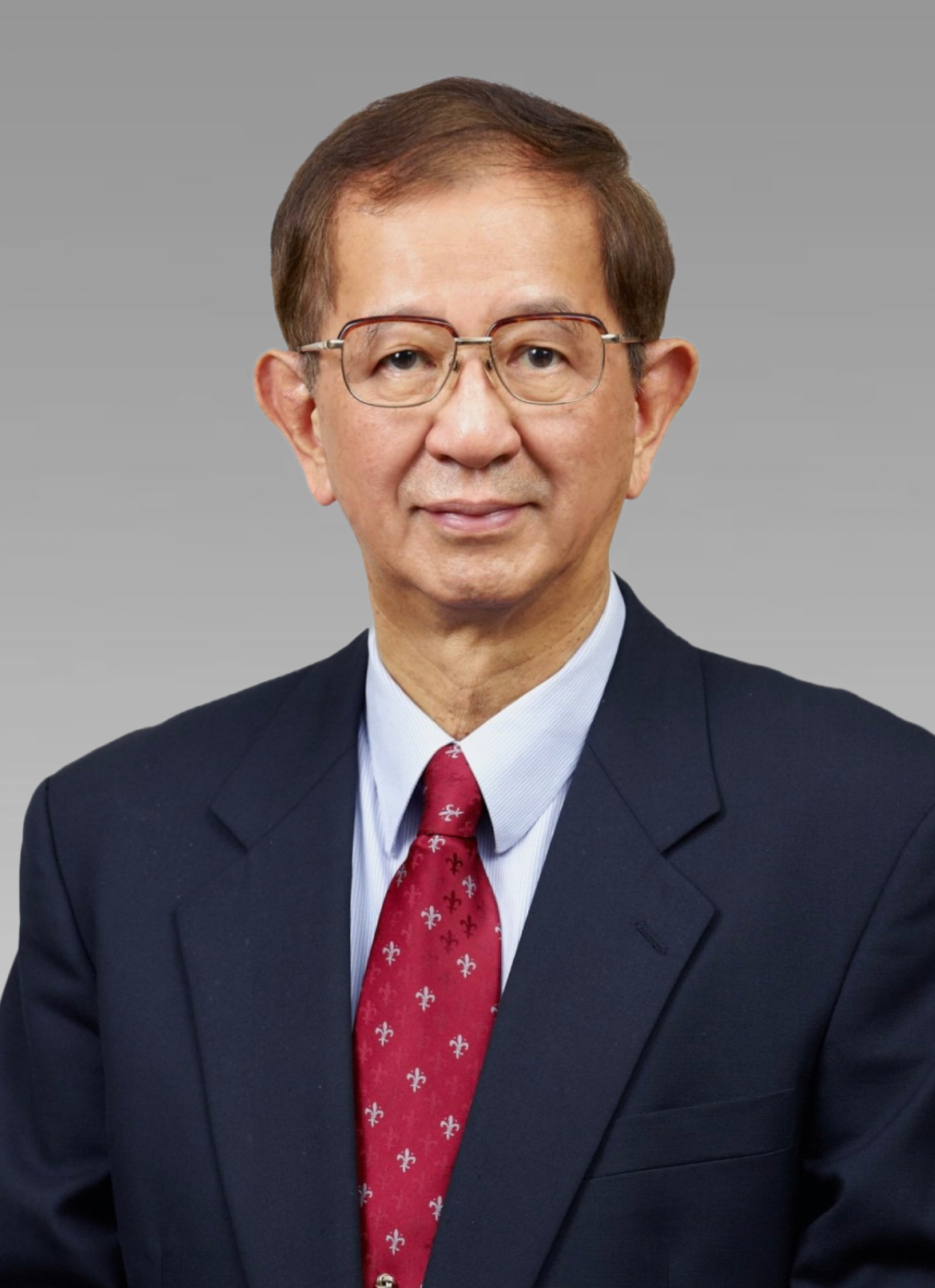
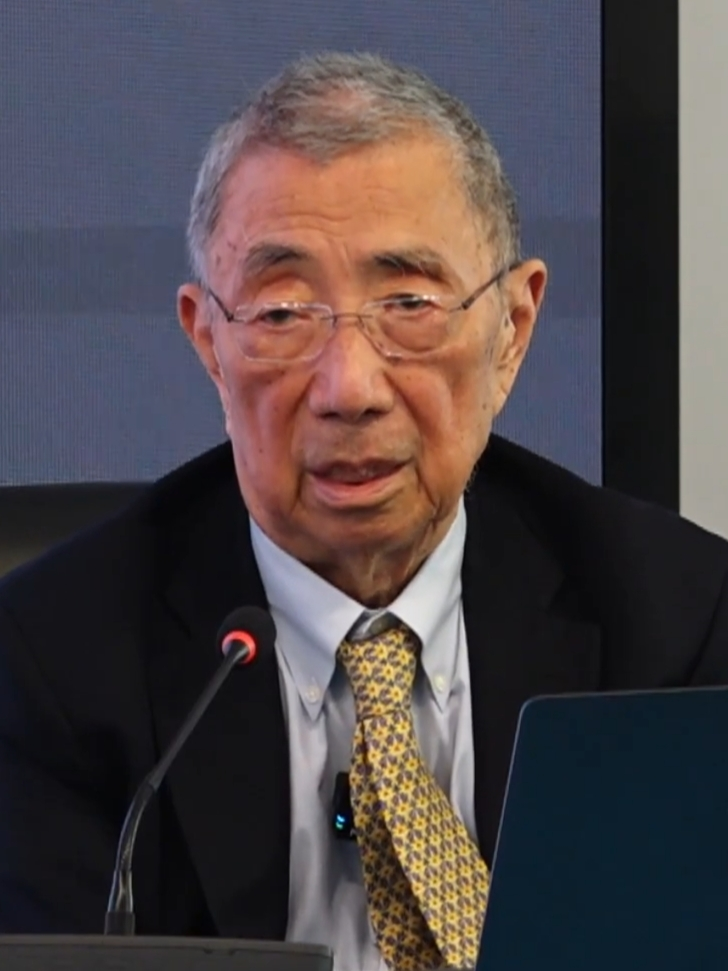
Chemist Yuan T. Lee (left) and physicist Samuel C. C. Ting (right) were awarded the Nobel Prize in 1986 and 1976, respectively.
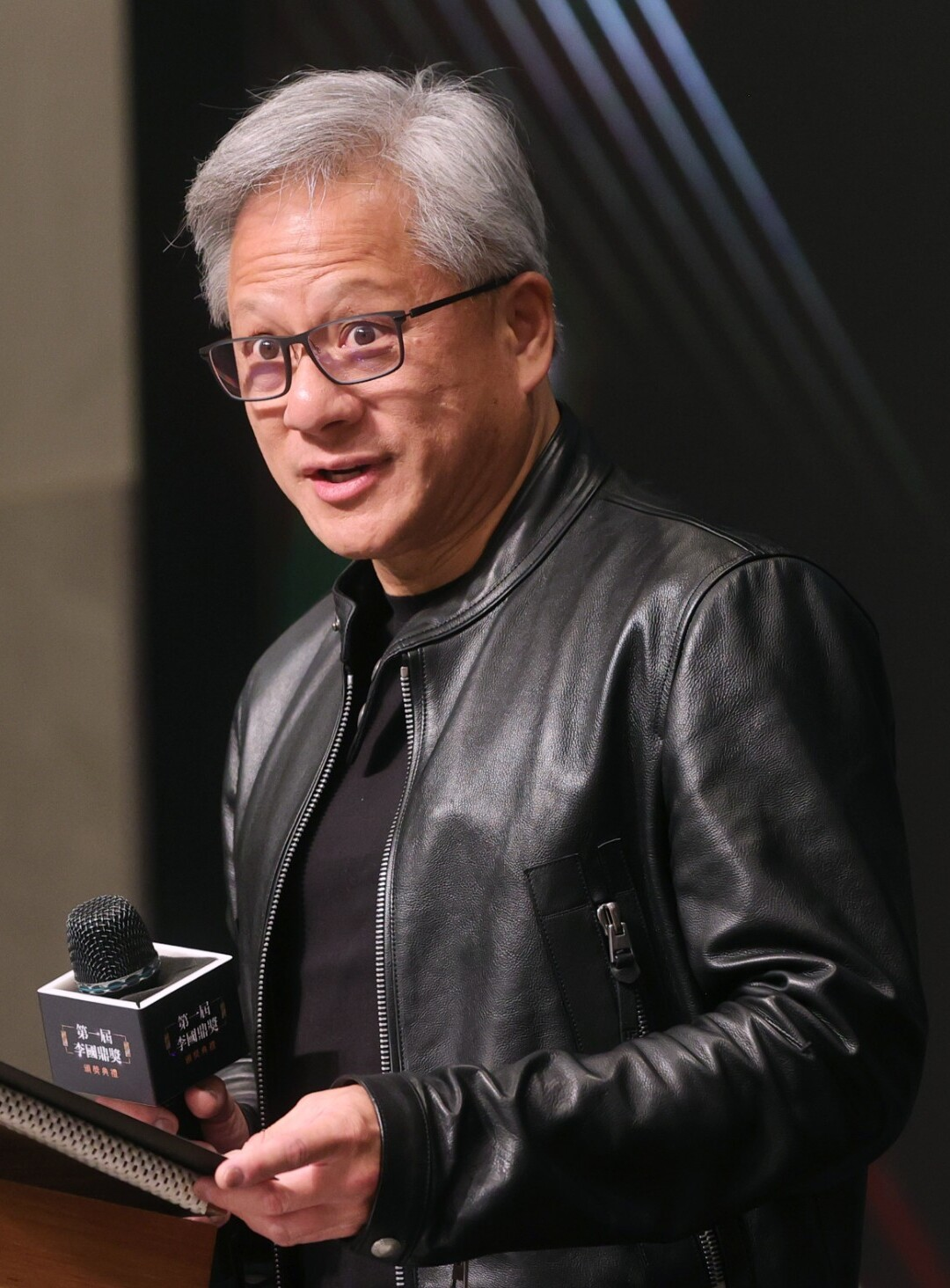
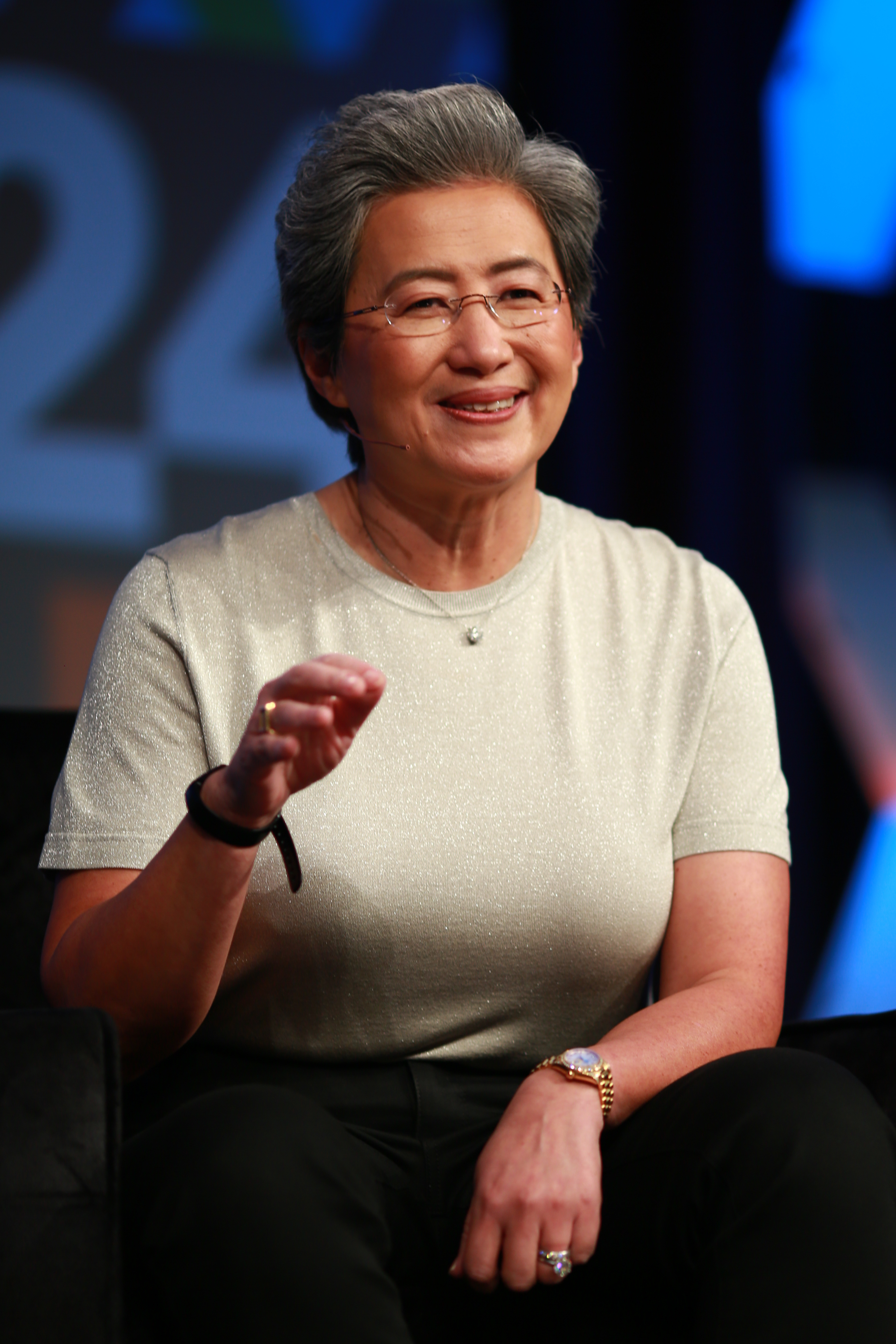
Jensen Huang (left), head of Nvidia, and Lisa Su (right), head of AMD, are cousins who immigrated from Taiwan as children.

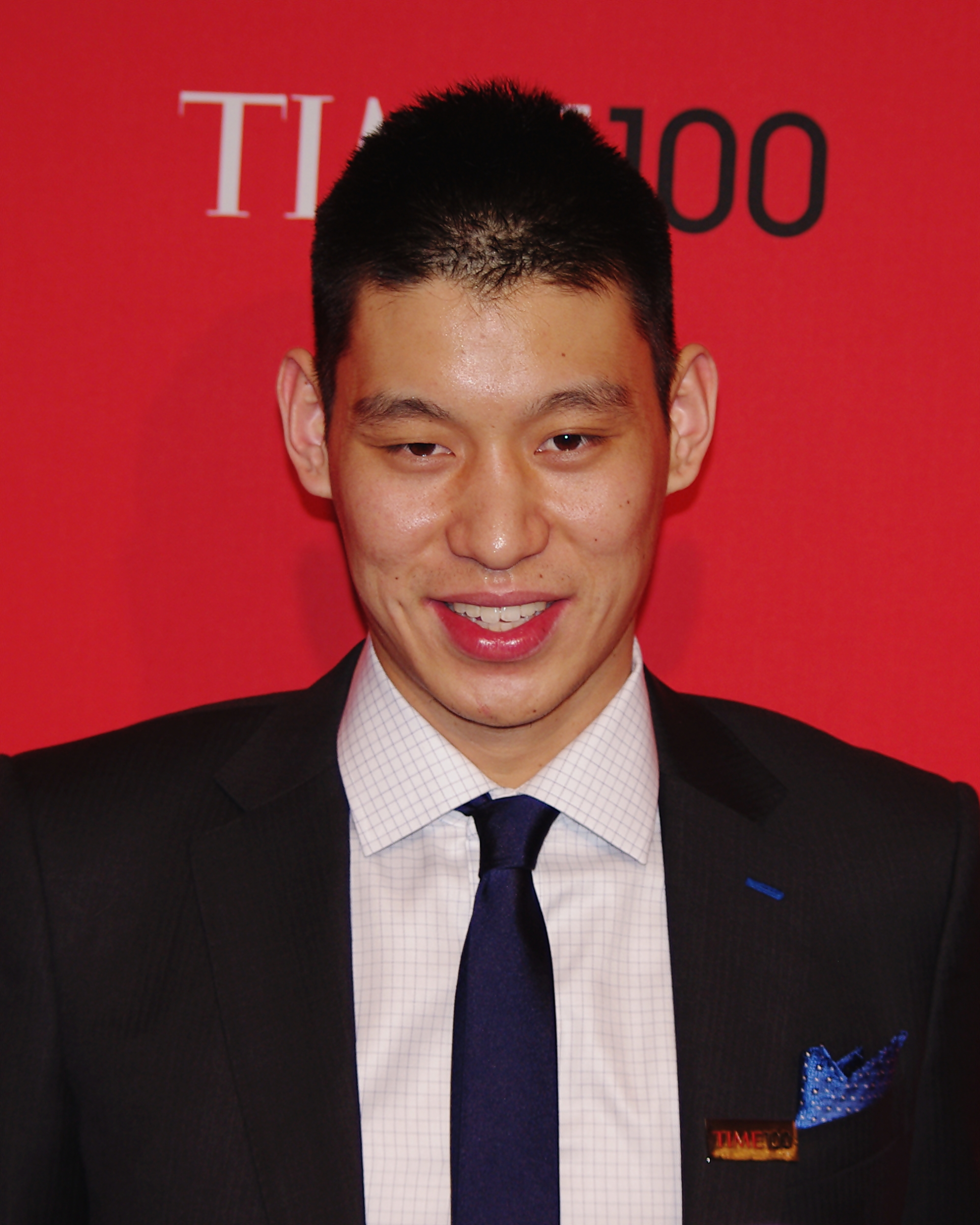
Jeremy Lin
林書豪

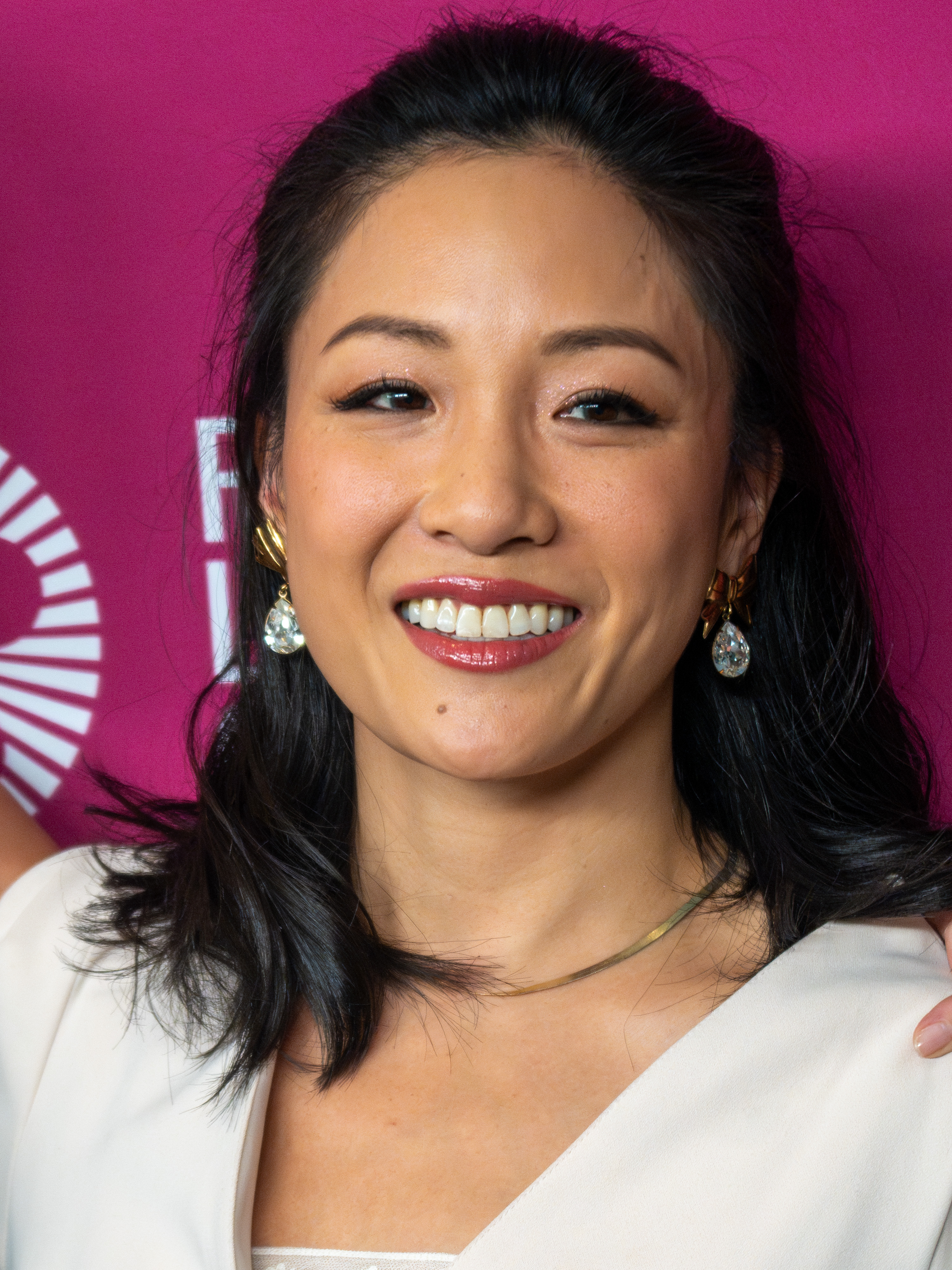
Constance Wu
吳恬敏

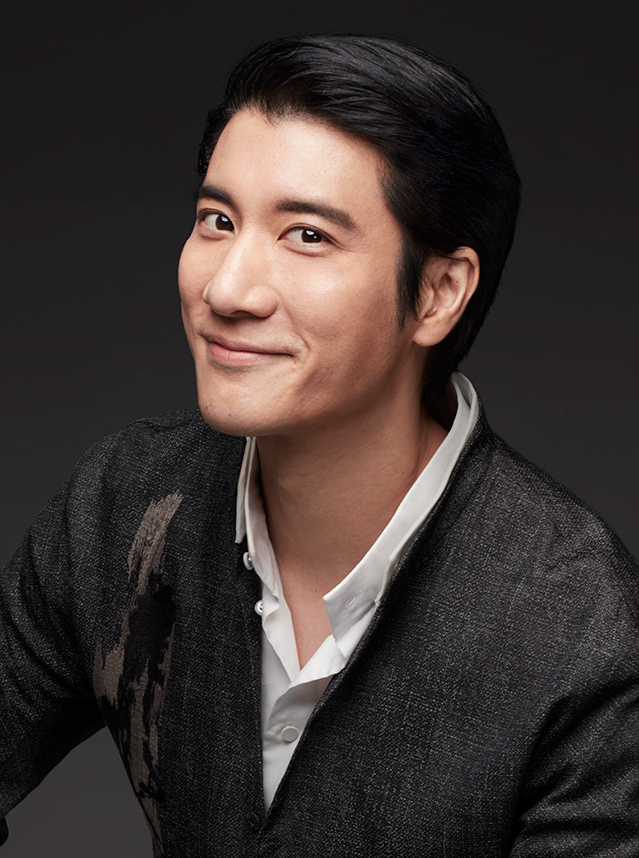
Wang Leehom
王力宏

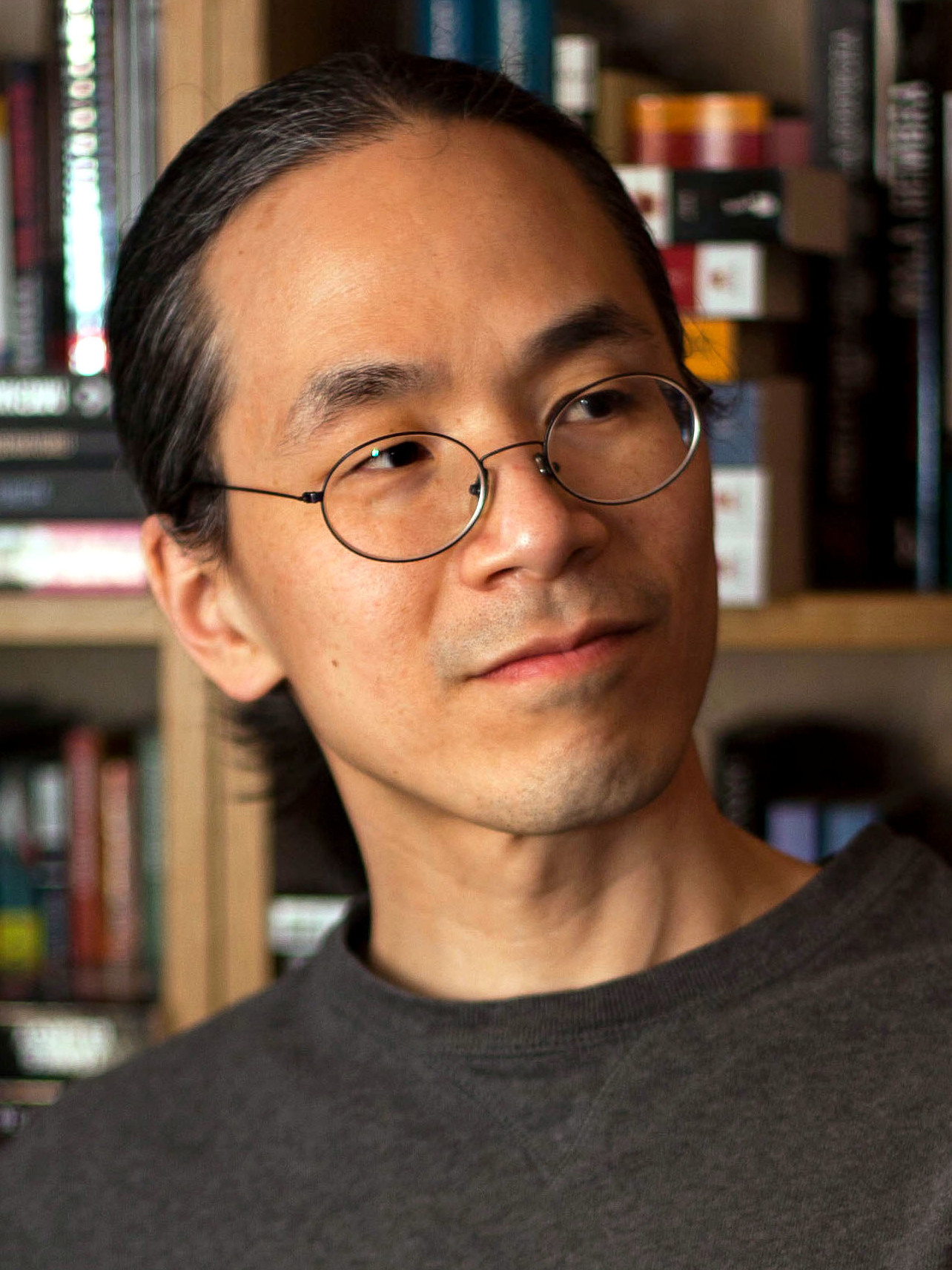
Ted Chiang
姜峯楠

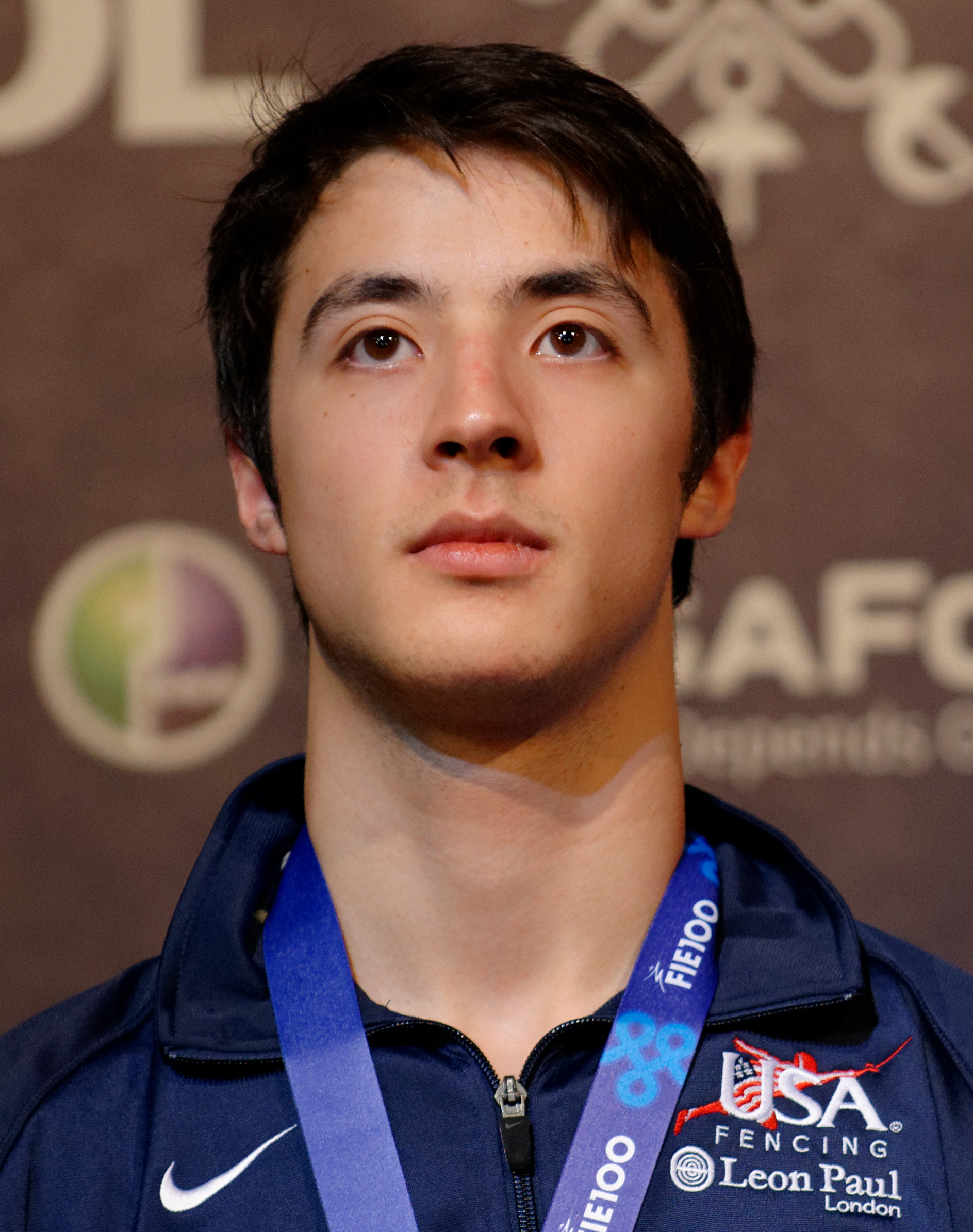
Alexander Massialas
陳海翔

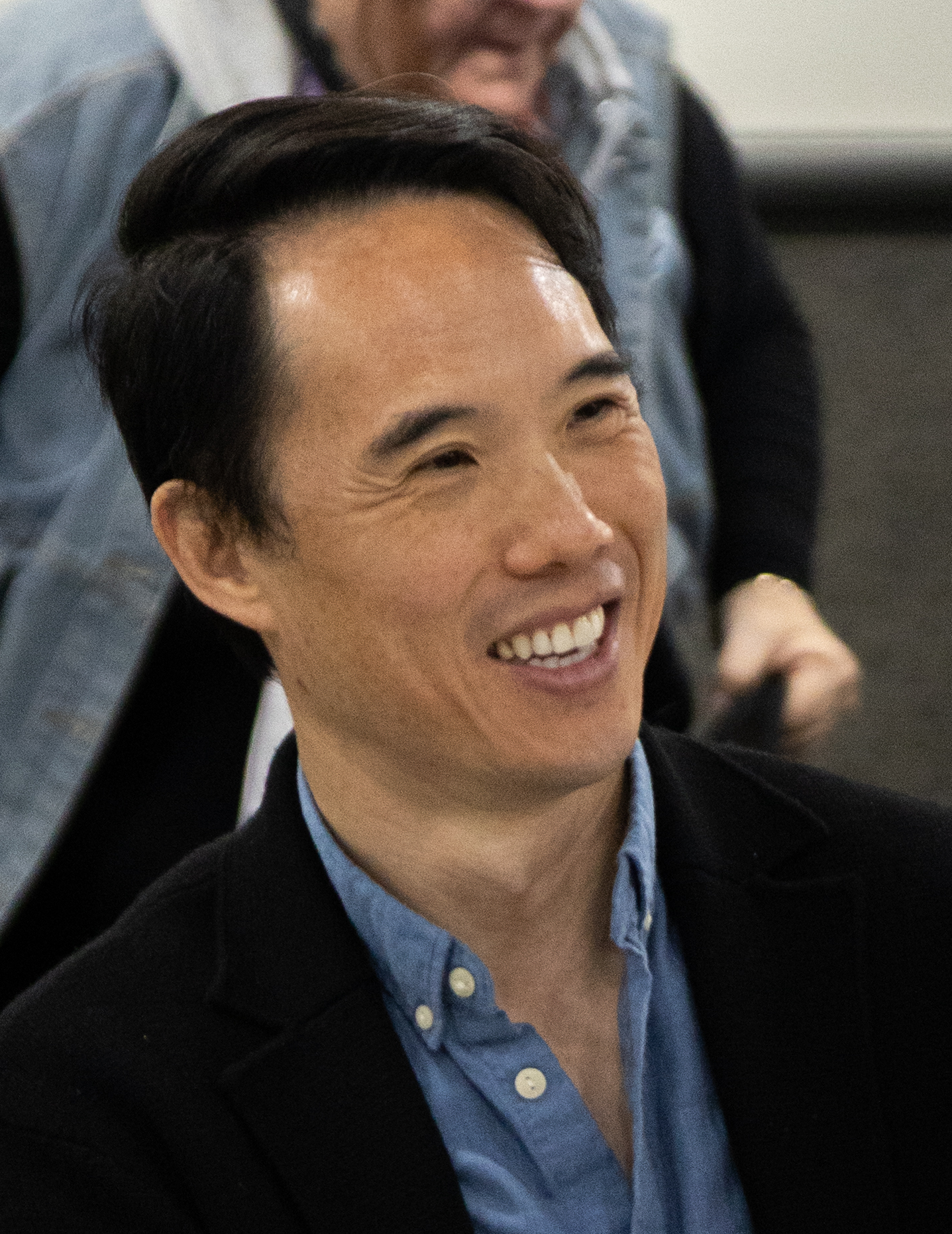
Charles Yu
游朝凱

Academia and science
Name	Birthdate	Notability
Yuan T. Lee	1936 (Note: After earning his doctorate from the University of California, Berkeley, Lee became a naturalized U.S. citizen in 1974, which enabled him to work at the Lawrence Berkeley National Laboratory. In 1994, he renounced his U.S. citizenship in order to become the president of Academia Sinica.)	Awarded Nobel Prize in Chemistry (1986)
Samuel C. C. Ting	1936	Awarded Nobel Prize for Physics (1976)
David R. Liu	1973	Harvard University, Broad Institute professor
Tim Wu	1971	Columbia Law School professor and scholar
Ed Lu	1963	Physicist and NASA astronaut
Kai-Fu Lee	1961^{‡}	Apple, Google, and Microsoft scientist
Thomas Huang	1936–2020^{‡}	Computer scientist at University of Illinois
David Ho	1952^{‡}	Virologist, pioneer of HIV/AIDS research
Fan Chung	1949^{‡}	Mathematician at UC San Diego
Chang-Lin Tien	1935–2002^{‡}	Chancellor of UC Berkeley
Paul Ching Wu Chu	1949^{‡}	President of HKUST
Yuan Chang	1959^{‡}	Pathologist, discovered MCPyV and KSHV
Chenming Hu	1947^{‡}	Engineering professor at UC Berkeley
Andrew Yao	1946 (Note: Born in the Republic of China (1912–1949), Yao became a naturalized U.S. citizen but renounced his U.S. and Taiwanese citizenship in 2015.)	Computer scientist, computational theorist
Henry Yang	1940^{‡}	Chancellor of UC Santa Barbara
James C. Liao	1958^{‡}	President of Academia Sinica
Lan Samantha Chang	1965	Endowed professor, University of Iowa
^{‡} Born in Taiwan or Republic of China (1912–1949)

Business, entertainment, and arts
Name	Birthdate	Notability
Jensen Huang	1963^{‡}	Co-founder, CEO, and president of Nvidia
Lisa Su	1969^{‡}	CEO, president, and chair of AMD
Morris Chang	1931^{‡}	Founder, CEO, and chairman of TSMC
Jeremy Lin	1988	Basketball player at Harvard, New York Knicks
Jerry Yang	1968^{‡}	Co-founder and CEO of Yahoo
Steve Chen	1978^{‡}	Co-founder of YouTube
Constance Wu	1982	Actress known for Crazy Rich Asians (2018)
Wang Leehom	1976	Singer-songwriter, actor, producer
Janet Hsieh	1980	Model, violinist, television personality
Ted Chiang	1967	Science fiction writer
Emily Chang	1980	Journalist, television host, reporter, author
Tao Lin	1983	Novelist, poet, essayist, short-story writer, and artist
Charles Yu	1976	Writer known for Interior Chinatown (2020)
Tony Hsieh	1973–2020	Founder and CEO of Zappos
Ellen Pao	1970	CEO of Reddit
Greg Tseng	1979^{‡}	Founder and CEO of Tagged
Alexander Massialas	1994	Fencer and Olympic medalist from Stanford
Dan Lin	1973^{‡}	TV producer, executive at Warner Bros. Pictures
Andy Fang	1992	Co-founder and CTO of DoorDash
Justin Lin	1971	Film and television director, producer, and screenwriter.
^{‡} Born in Taiwan or Republic of China (1912–1949)

== See also ==
- List of Taiwanese Americans
- Taiwanese people
- Han Taiwanese
- Hoklo Americans
- Hakka Americans
- Taiwan-United States relations
- Taiwanese Americans in the San Francisco Bay Area
- Taiwanese people in New York City
- Taiwanese Americans in Los Angeles

== Bibliography ==
- Brown, Melissa J. (2004). Is Taiwan Chinese? : The Impact of Culture, Power and Migration on Changing Identities. Berkeley: University of California Press. ISBN 0-520-23182-1.
- Davidson, James W. (1903). The Island of Formosa, Past and Present : history, people, resources, and commercial prospects : tea, camphor, sugar, gold, coal, sulphur, economical plants, and other productions. London and New York: Macmillan. OCLC 1887893. OL 6931635M.
- Jones, J. Sydney, "Taiwanese Americans." Gale Encyclopedia of Multicultural America, edited by Thomas Riggs, (3rd ed., vol. 4, Gale, 2014), pp. 343–356. Online
- The Republic of China Yearbook 2014 (PDF). Executive Yuan, R.O.C. 2014. ISBN 9789860423020. Archived (PDF) from the original on August 20, 2017.
- Rubenfeld, Jed; Chua, Amy (February 5, 2014). The Triple Package: How Three Unlikely Traits Explain the Rise and Fall of Cultural Groups in America. A&C Black. ISBN 978-1-4088-5222-4.
- Waters, Mary C.; Ueda, Reed; Marrow, Helen B. (January 30, 2007). The New Americans: A Guide to Immigration since 1965. Harvard University Press. ISBN 978-0-674-26827-2.
- Ng, Franklin (November 26, 2013). "Taiwanese Americans". In Xiaojian, Zhao; Park, Edward J. W. (eds.). Asian Americans: An Encyclopedia of Social, Cultural, Economic, and Political History [3 volumes]. Bloomsbury Publishing USA. ISBN 978-1-59884-240-1.
- Chen, Carolyn (August 31, 2014). Getting Saved in America: Taiwanese Immigration and Religious Experience. Princeton University Press. ASIN B01B98ZNA8.
- Lung, Shirley M. (July 1, 2024). "Taiwanese Churches in Diaspora and Ethnic Identity Formation". International Bulletin of Mission Research. 48 (3): 367–382. doi:10.1177/23969393241241520. ISSN 2396-9393.
- Jones, J. Sidney (2014). "Taiwanese Americans". In Riggs, Thomas (ed.). Gale Encyclopedia of Multicultural America. Vol. 4 (3rd ed.). Cengage Group. pp. 343–356.
- Ng, Franklin (May 26, 1998). The Taiwanese Americans. Bloomsbury Academic. ISBN 978-0-313-29762-5.
- Gu, Chien-Juh (2006). Mental Health Among Taiwanese Americans: Gender, Immigration, and Transnational Struggles. Western Michigan University Press. ISBN 978-1-59332-130-7.
- Chen, Hsiang-Shui (1992). Chinatown No More: Taiwan Immigrants in Contemporary New York. Cornell University Press. ISBN 978-0-8014-2697-1.
- Gu, Chien-Juh (January 22, 2018). The Resilient Self: Gender, Immigration, and Taiwanese Americans. Rutgers University Press. ISBN 978-0-8135-8607-6.
- Hsu, Madeline Y. (April 27, 2015). The Good Immigrants: How the Yellow Peril Became the Model Minority. Princeton University Press. ISBN 978-1-4008-6637-3.
- Chang, Yu-chiao (January 1, 2022). "Dimensions of Taiwanese American Identity". History & Perspectives on Chinese America. Chinese Historical Society of America: 21–27.
- Chao, David C. (July 1, 2024). "The 1517 Project and World Christianity: Migration and the Uses of Doctrine". International Bulletin of Mission Research. 48 (3): 399–426. doi:10.1177/23969393241248438. ISSN 2396-9393.
- Chang, Benjamin (February 2017). "Asian Americans and Education". Oxford Research Encyclopedia of Education (PDF). Oxford University Press. pp. 1–39. doi:10.1093/acrefore/9780190264093.013.102. ISBN 978-0-19-026409-3 – via United States Department of Education.
- Lee, Jonathan H. X. (2013). "Taiwanese and Taiwanese Americans, 1940–present" (PDF). In Barkan, Elliot Robert (ed.). Immigrants in American History: Arrival, Adaptation, and Integration. ABC-Clio. pp. 1331–1340. ISBN 978-1-59884-219-7 – via San Francisco State University.
- Avenarius, Christine (2004), "Taiwanese Americans", in Ember, Carol R.; Ember, Melvin (eds.), Encyclopedia of Sex and Gender: Men and Women in the World's Cultures Volume I: Topics and Cultures A-K Volume II: Cultures L-Z, Boston, MA: Springer US, pp. 858–867, doi:10.1007/0-387-29907-6_89, ISBN 978-0-387-29907-5
