= TACL =

TACL may refer to:

- TACL (programming language), a scripting language serving as the shell in Tandem/NonStop computers
- Taiwanese American Citizens League, an American non-profit organization focusing on civic involvement and community empowerment for Taiwanese Americans
- Tantalum(V) chloride (or tantalum pentachloride), a chemical compound with the formula TaCl_{5}
- Transactions of the Association for Computational Linguistics, an annual peer-reviewed open-access journal
