= List of ethnic groups in the United States by per capita income =

This article lists per capita income estimates for U.S. residents, organized by race and ethnicity and ancestry. The year and population definition are stated for each table.

The Census Bureau defines per-capita income as a group's aggregate income divided by its total population, including children and people living in group quarters. It is a mean income measure.

== By race and ethnicity ==
The United States Census used race and ethnicity classifications defined by the Office of Management and Budget in 1997. The following all-age per-capita income estimates are from American Community Survey 2018 1-year estimates. In 2018, the nationwide population was 327,167,439 and the per capita income was US$33,831 in 2018.

S0201: ACS 1-Year Estimates Selected Population Profiles (2018)
Race and Ethnicity	Alone			Alone or in Combination with Other Races			Ref
Race and Ethnicity	Code	Population	Per-capita income (2018 US$)	Code	Population	Per-capita income (2018 US$)	Ref
White	002	236,173,020	36,962	003	245,860,228	36,292	
Black or African American	004	41,617,764	23,303	005	46,261,485	22,502	
Asian	012	18,415,198	40,878	031	22,137,269	38,130	
Some other race	070	16,253,785	19,162	071	18,146,776	19,298	
Hispanic or Latino (of any race)	—	—	—	400	59,763,631	20,590	
Not Hispanic or Latino	—	—	—	450	267,403,808	36,790	

== Household and working-age income comparison (2024) ==
The following chart compares median household income with mean personal income for adults aged 18-64. Its personal-income series uses a different age range from the all-age per-capita income reported in the tables.

Median household income and mean personal income of adults aged 18-64 for selected U.S. groups, 2024 ACS PUMS. Rows are ordered by household median; householders of all ages are included.

== By detailed racial and ethnic groups ==
=== Asian groups (2024) ===
The following table presents published 2024 ACS 1-year S0201 estimates for selected Asian groups. Each group is reported alone, regardless of Hispanic origin. Per-capita income covers people of all ages and is expressed in 2024 dollars.

Selected Asian groups: all-age per-capita income, 2024
Group	Population	Per-capita income (2024 US$)
Taiwanese	299,993	83,810
Asian Indian	5,094,694	76,212
Sri Lankan	63,896	65,069
Chinese, except Taiwanese	4,503,523	63,939
Japanese	751,663	62,797
Korean	1,567,452	62,787
Filipino	3,262,427	49,331
Pakistani	624,982	46,649
Thai	211,448	44,074
Vietnamese	1,981,019	43,497
Indonesian	91,034	42,807
Cambodian	272,874	40,751
Laotian	180,440	39,540
Nepalese	259,874	39,126
Bangladeshi	308,332	35,509
Hmong	349,624	27,547
Burmese	223,191	26,261
United States, total population	340,110,990	45,256

=== Native Hawaiian and Other Pacific Islander ===
In the 2018 American Community Survey, the following figures regarding detailed Native Hawaiian and Other Pacific Islander groups were reported.

S0201: ACS 1-Year Estimates Selected Population Profiles (2018)
Detailed Race	Alone			Alone or in Combination with Other Races		
Detailed Race	Code	Population	Per-capita income (2018 US$)	Code	Population	Per-capita income (2018 US$)
Polynesian	051	357,532	25,715	061	887,467	25,206
Native Hawaiian	052	186,996	29,771	062	626,457	27,078
Samoan	053	110,606	21,630	063	213,439	20,090
Micronesian	055	188,142	24,116	065	284,452	22,925
Guamanian or Chamorro	056	104,219	31,279	066	182,584	27,312

== By ancestry (2014) ==
The following historical table lists selected ancestry groups using 2014 ACS estimates, in 2014 dollars. It is not an exhaustive ranking of U.S. ethnic groups. Ancestry and race estimates come from different questions and tabulations and can differ for the same named group.

Selected ancestry groups, 2014 ACS
Rank among listed groups	Ancestry	Population (2014)	Per capita income (2014 US$)
1	Macedonian	57,221	50,818
2	Russian	2,762,830	50,684
3	Latvian	87,817	50,137
4	British (not otherwise specified)	1,326,960	49,202
5	Lithuanian	652,790	46,532
6	Slovene	178,273	45,317
7	Australian	98,397	44,681
8	Austrian	702,772	44,098
9	Iranian	452,815	43,173
10	Scottish	5,365,154	42,194
11	Croatian	419,647	41,425
12	Romanian	459,810	41,411
13	Hungarian	1,406,350	41,055
14	Slovak	706,662	41,036
15	Belgian	350,059	41,021
16	Swiss	939,268	41,000
17	Welsh	1,757,657	40,704
18	Danish	1,275,222	39,883
19	Israeli	148,514	39,864
20	Ukrainian	984,157	39,785
21	Syrian	170,066	39,713
22	Canadian	678,113	39,651
23	Serbian	181,171	38,981
24	Lebanese	506,470	38,971
25	Scotch-Irish	2,978,827	38,748
26	English	24,382,182	38,525
27	Bulgarian	90,981	37,560
28	Polish	9,249,392	37,413
29	Norwegian	4,444,566	36,866
30	Turkish	206,911	36,483
31	Italian	17,063,646	35,235
32	German	46,047,113	34,943
33	Armenian	461,076	34,402
34	Finnish	635,566	34,343
35	Irish	33,147,639	34,196
36	Dutch	4,243,067	34,160
37	French (excluding Basques)	8,153,515	33,818
38	Egyptian	239,108	32,466
39	Portuguese	1,340,026	32,194
40	Barbadian	63,455	30,797
41	Cajun	112,588	29,778
42	Palestinian	122,533	27,059
43	Nigerian	322,231	26,881
44	Ghanaian	117,247	25,871
45	American (not otherwise specified)	22,097,012	25,825
46	Guyanese	234,591	25,513
47	Brazilian	368,782	25,142
48	Jamaican	1,087,185	24,604
49	Pennsylvania German	299,817	24,369
50	Albanian	186,030	24,276
51	Assyrian	107,056	22,255
52	Moroccan	101,211	21,253
53	Jordanian	80,120	21,222
54	Cape Verdean	106,316	20,314
55	Black (not otherwise specified)	1,825,077	20,226
56	Iraqi	143,397	18,668
57	Afghan	97,865	18,516
58	Haitian	984,514	17,592

== See also ==
- List of ethnic groups in the United States by household income
- List of countries of birth by per capita income in the United States
- Racial wage gap in the United States
