= Jon Yao =

Taiwanese American Chef

- Education: University of California, Riverside
- Occupation: Cook
- Notable work: Kato
- Awards: James Beard Foundation Award (Best Chef:California, 2025); Forbes 30 Under 30 (2019)

Jon Yao (born circa 1991) is a Taiwanese American chef. Yao was awarded the James Beard Foundation Award for Best Chef:California in 2025. His restaurant Kato has two Michelin stars.

== Early Life and Education ==
Yao was born Jonathan Yao circa 1991. He grew up in San Gabriel Valley. His parents were born in Taiwan and are of Chinese descent. They both worked as interior designers. Yao graduated from the University of California, Riverside with a degree in anthropology.

== Career ==
After college, he had interned with at some restaurants in San Francisco include Michelin-starred restaurants Benu and Coi. He returned home to help his parents start a new business serving meals for college students in the Los Angeles area but after some setbacks they pivoted to serving a prix fixe menu. In 2016, Yao opened Kato in West Los Angeles where he became known for serving food inspired from his Taiwanese heritage. The restaurants name was inspired by the Green Hornet's sidekick.

In 2018, Food & Wine named Yao "Best New Chef." In 2019, Yao's Kato earned one Michelin star in the California selection. That same year, he was named in the Forbes 30 Under 30 in Food and Drink.

In 2021, He also was won the Young Chef Award in California from Michelin that same year. He was also a judge on the cooking television show MasterChef in 2021. In 2022, Yao moved Kato to Row DTLA in the Los Angeles' Arts District and later that year Kato was awarded a Michelin star. Kato was also recognized as “one to watch” by The World’s 50 Best Restaurants that same year.

In 2025, Yao was awarded the James Beard Foundation Award for Best Chef:California. During his acceptance speech, Yao advocated for the protection of immigrant communities in Los Angeles in light of the increase in immigration raids by the United States Immigration and Customs Enforcement agency.

In 2026, Kato earned its second Michelin star.
