= List of ethnic groups in the United States by household income =

This is a list of median household income in the United States ranked by ethnicity and Native American tribal grouping (as of 2021) according to the United States Census. "Mixed race" (in combination with other races) and multi-ethnic categories are not listed separately.

For Per Capita Income (per person income) by Race and Ethnicity go to List of ethnic groups in the United States by per capita income. Household income refers to the total gross income received by all members of a household within a 12-month period. This includes the earnings of everyone aged 15 or older who lives in the same household, whether they are related or not.

== By race and ethnicity ==
The United States Census has race and ethnicity as defined by the Office of Management and Budget in 1997. The following median household income data are retrieved from American Community Survey 2021 1-year estimates. In this survey, the nationwide population was 331,893,745 in 2021. The median household income in 2021 across the general population (all races and ethnicities included) was $69,717.

S0201: ACS 1-Year Estimates Selected Population Profiles (2021)
Race and ethnicity	Alone			Alone or in combination with other races		
Race and ethnicity	Code	Population	Median household income (US$)	Code	Population	Median household income (US$)
Asian Americans	012	19,157,288	99,572	031	23,545,238	96,626
White	002	202,981,791	74,932	003	241,836,150	73,594
Native Hawaiian and Other Pacific Islander	050	612,448	69,973	060	1,541,118	72,131
United States (general population)	001	331,893,745	69,717			
Non-White Hispanic	070	23,902,781	57,671	071	53,868,002	61,042
American Indian and Alaska Native	006	3,158,694	53,148	009	8,750,904	56,990
Black American	004	40,194,304	46,774	005	50,234,227	47,597

== By detailed races/ethnicities ==
Median household income and mean personal income of adults aged 18-64 for selected U.S. groups, 2024 ACS PUMS. Rows are ordered by household median; householders of all ages are included.

=== Asian Americans ===
In the 2022 American Community Survey, the following figures regarding detailed Asian ethnicities are reported. The NCRC Asian American income is better understood when household size and cost of living is factored as many Asian American groups have larger households and disproportionally live in metropolitan areas where the cost of living is high. For this reason, looking at List of ethnic groups in the United States by per capita income and personal earnings may be a more accurate representation of data.

Detailed Ethnicity	Alone			Alone or in Combination with Other Races		
Detailed Ethnicity	Code	Population	Median household income (US$)	Code	Population	Median household income (US$)
Indian	013	4,534,339	152,341	032	4,946,306	147,728
Taiwanese	018	263,772	122,951	037	310,503	117,652
Filipino	019	2,969,978	109,090	038	4,466,918	104,695
Pakistani	026	560,494	106,281	045	625,570	105,311
Chinese	017	4,258,198	101,728	036	5,493,250	101,534
Sri Lankan	027	75,808	96,641	046	86,690	94,034
Japanese	022	717,413	94,319	041	1,587,040	97,690
Nepalese	076	247,639	92,262	084	260,323	92,779
Korean	023	1,501,587	91,261	042	2,051,572	91,860
Hmong	020	335,612	88,572	039	362,244	87,651
Indonesian	021	84,074	86,994	040	155,173	87,552
Cambodian	015	280,862	86,653	034	376,096	89,407
Thai	028	197,158	85,889	047	328,176	88,770
Vietnamese	029	1,887,550	84,572	048	2,301,868	86,025
Bangladeshi	014	256,681	80,288	033	272,338	80,196
Laotian	024	173,524	78,551	043	245,220	79,260
Burmese	073	225,591	69,281	081	244,086	70,830

=== Native Hawaiian and Other Pacific Islander ===
In the 2019 American Community Survey, the following figures regarding detailed Native Hawaiian and Other Pacific Islander races are reported.

S0201: ACS 1-Year Estimates Selected Population Profiles (2019)
Detailed Race	Alone			Alone or in Combination with Other Races		
Detailed Race	Code	Population	Median household income (US$)	Code	Population	Median household income (US$)
Guamanian or Chamorro	056	78,323	72,722	066	160,773	70,792
Samoan	053	112,845	67,573	063	204,640	66,558
Polynesian	051	373,945	65,968	061	865,155	69,331
Micronesian	055	173,592	62,659	065	267	64,379
Native Hawaiian	052	198,734	62,272	062	607,010	69,642

=== American Indian and Alaska Native ===
In the 2014 American Community Survey, the following figures regarding 12 prominent American Indian and Alaska Native tribes are reported.

Median Household Income Ranked By Native American Tribal Grouping (2014)
Rank	Group	Income (US$)
1	Chickasaw	49,963
2	Choctaw	47,783
3	Alaska Natives	47,402
4	Creek	41,897
5	Iroquois	40,471
6	Cherokee	37,730
7	Blackfeet	37,033
8	Chippewa	34,463
9	Lumbee	33,863
10	Navajo	31,057
11	Sioux	29,079
12	Apache	28,745

=== Hispanic and Latino Americans ===
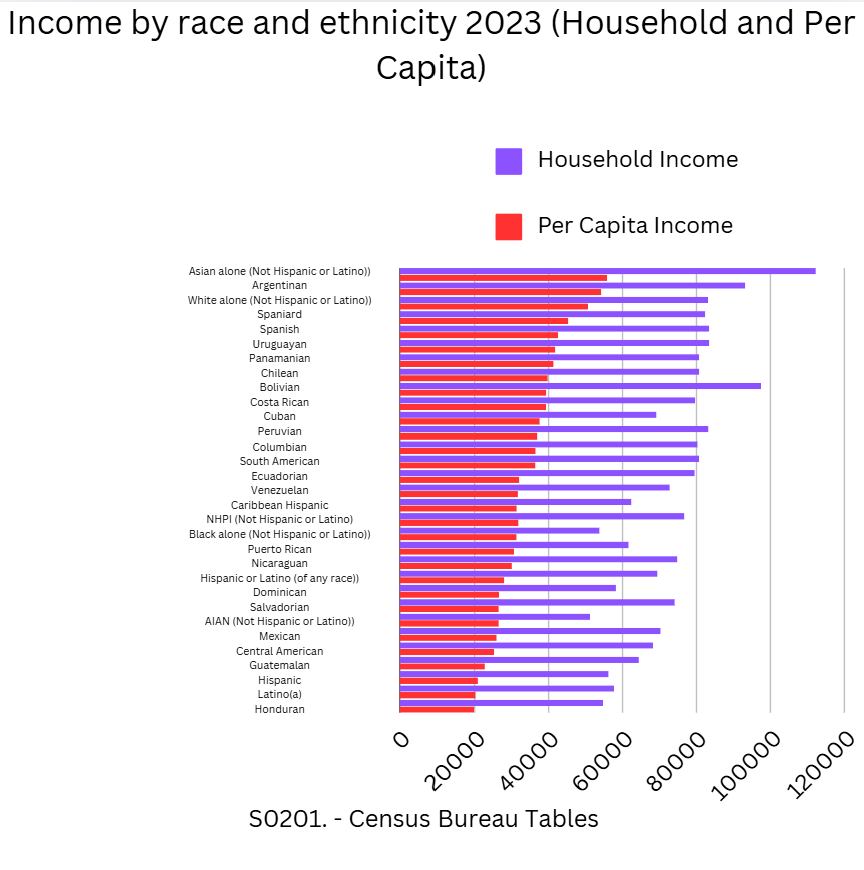
Income by Race and Ethnicity and Hispanic origins 2023 (Household and Per Capita)

In the 2021 American Community Survey, the following figures regarding detailed Hispanic and Latino ethnicities are reported.

S0201: ACS 1-Year Estimates Selected Population Profiles (2021)
Detailed Race	Alone			Alone or in Combination with Other Races		
Detailed Race	Code	Population	Median household income (US$)	Code	Population	Median household income (US$)
Argentine		286,346	93,798			
Bolivian		116,646	87,192			
Chilean		172,062	84,719			
Uruguayan		60,013	82,003			
Costa Rican		154,784	81,088			
Peruvian		720,626	77,024			
Nicaraguan		429,501	73,790			
Colombian		2,601,720	73,556			
Brazilian		1,905,000	73,285			
Ecuadorian		870,965	72,163			
Panamanian		206,219	69,864			
Venezuelan		814,080	69,830			
Paraguayan		25,022	69,470			
Salvadoran		2,473,947	69,319			
Mexican		37,414,772	66,481			
Cuban		2,435,573	66,241			
Haitian		1,084,055	66,069			
Guatemalan		1,524,743	61,103			
Puerto Rican		5,905,178	59,268			
Dominican		2,393,718	56,758			
Honduran		1,083,540	55,380			

== Detailed ancestry ==
The list below provides median household incomes by ethnicity but does not include all ethnic groups as tracked by the United States Census according to the 2023: ACS 1-Year Estimates.

Rank	Reported ancestry	Income (US$)
1	Australian	$116,649
2	South African	$107,595
3	Iranian	$104,993
4	Latvian	$104,240
5	Serbian	$101,546
6	Austrian	$101,561
7	European	$100,615
8	Russian	$100,458
9	Lebanese	$100,406
10	Romanian	$99,485
11	Basque	$98,879
12	Greek	$97,457
13	Swiss	$96,472
14	Lithuanian	$96,471
15	Croatian	$96,070

The list below provides median household incomes by ethnicity but does not include all ethnic groups as tracked by the United States Census according to the 2022: ACS 1-Year Estimates.

Median household income by detailed ancestry
Ancestry	Income (US$)
Latvian	109,733
Iranian	99,678
Australian	95,923
South African	94,159
Lebanese	92,697
European	91,857
Macedonian	91,852
Russian	90,296
Austrian	89,459
Croatian	88,325
Turkish	87,648
Lithuanian	87,433
Greek	87,428
British	87,288
Swiss	85,543
Albanian	85,092
Serbian	84,607
Danish	84,520
Scandinavian	84,518
Bulgarian	84,437
Italian	84,416
Slovene	84,261
Czech	83,823
Armenian	83,756
Slovak	83,755
Ukrainian	83,723
Guyanese	83,412
Scottish	83,342
Portuguese	82,925
Polish	82,846
Ghanaian	82,758
Swedish	82,731
Syrian	82,532
Belgian	82,469
Israeli	82,436
Romanian	81,768
Canadian	81,576
English	81,200
Norwegian	81,168
Hungarian	80,684
Finnish	79,215
German	78,960
Irish	78,949
Yugoslav	78,560
Nigerian	78,005
Welsh	78,025
Scotch-Irish	77,802
French Canadian	76,292
French	75,783
Palestinian	75,521
Czechoslovak	75,453
Egyptian	74,848
Dutch	74,717
Arab (Note: All groups)	72,943
Barbadian	72,053
Trinidadian and Tobagonian	71,920
Brazilian	70,904
Assyrian	70,692
Cajun	66,476
Jamaican	65,789
Jordanian	65,607
Belizean	63,785
West Indian (Note: All groups, excluding Hispanic origin groups)	63,597
Pennsylvania Dutch	62,436
Moroccan	61,773
Haitian	60,169
American	59,995
Subsaharan African (Note: All groups)	58,881
Ethiopian	58,507
Iraqi	57,067
Appalachian	49,747

== See also ==
- List of ethnic groups in the United States by per capita income
- Racial pay gap in the United States
