= Taiwanese American Citizens League =

Nonprofit organization in the United States

- Abbreviation: TACL
- Founded: 1985; 41 years ago
- Founder: Li-Pei Wu
- Type: Nonprofit organization
- Headquarters: Los Angeles, California, United States
- Website: https://tacl.org/

Taiwanese American Citizens League (TACL; Chinese: 台美公民協會 ) is a nonprofit organization in the United States dedicated to enhancing the civic participation, advocacy, and cultural identity of Taiwanese Americans. Founded in 1985 in Los Angeles, California, TACL promotes demographic visibility campaigns, youth leadership development programs, and professional networks across the United States.

== History ==
TACL was established in 1985 in Los Angeles by community leader Li-Pei Wu and local Taiwanese American civic advocates. The organization was modeled in part after the Japanese American Citizens League (JACL), with the aim of fostering political engagement, leadership, and civil rights awareness within the Taiwanese American community.

During the late 1980s and 1990s, TACL engaged in municipal politics and civic representation in Southern California, focusing on local elections, community advocacy, and anti-discrimination initiatives.

== Campaigns and programs ==
=== United States Census recognition ===
TACL has organized public education campaigns encouraging Taiwanese Americans to select the "Other Asian" category and write in "Taiwanese" on the United States census, including campaigns associated with the 2000, 2010, and 2020 censuses. The campaigns seek to improve the visibility of Taiwanese Americans in demographic data and their representation in public policy.

=== Advocacy and Kenny's Law ===
Following the murder of a former participant in a TACL youth program in Southern California, the organization advocated for victims' rights alongside state legislators. The advocacy was associated with California Assembly Bill 2428, known as Kenny's Law, enacted in 2004.

=== Taiwanese American Professionals ===
TACL established the Taiwanese American Professionals (TAP) program, a network of regional chapters in metropolitan areas including Los Angeles, San Francisco, New York City, Seattle, Washington, D.C., and Atlanta. TAP provides career networking, mentorship, community service, and cultural programs for young professionals.

=== Youth and leadership development ===
TACL operates youth leadership programs, including the Leadership Identity Development (LID) camp and the Leadership Youth Forum (LYF), as well as political and media internship opportunities.

== See also ==
- Taiwanese Americans
- Japanese American Citizens League
