= Kato (restaurant) =

Restaurant in Los Angeles, California, U.S.

- Interactive map of Kato

Restaurant information
- Head chef: Jon Yao
- Food type: Taiwanese
- Rating: (Michelin Guide)
- Location: 777 S. Alameda St., Building 1, Los Angeles, Los Angeles, California, 90021, United States
- Coordinates: 34°2′3″N 118°14′27.8″W
- Website: www.katorestaurant.com

Kato is a Michelin-starred omakase-style Taiwanese restaurant located in the Arts District in Los Angeles, California. Kato is owned by Jon Yao.

== Awards and accolades ==
- Ranked 25th in North America's 50 Best Restaurants.
- Rated 2 Michelin Star by the Michelin Guide in 2026.
- Ranked #1 by the Los Angeles Times 101 Best Restaurants in 2019 and 2023.

== See also ==
- List of Michelin-starred restaurants in California
