= List of Asian Americans =

Notable Asian Americans include:

== Academia ==
- Manjul Bhargava, mathematician
- Raj Chetty, professor of economics
- Leon O. Chua, computer scientist
- Margaret Chung, first female Chinese physician in the United States
- Conrado Gempesaw, Former President, St. John's University
- S. I. Hayakawa, professor of English, president of San Francisco State University, and U.S. Senator
- Sumiko Hennessy, professor of social work
- Hao Huang, Frankel Chair of Music, ethnomusicologist, Scripps College
- Jaegwon Kim, professor of philosophy
- Jagdish Natwarlal Bhagwati, professor of economics
- Eswar Prasad, economist
- Raghuram Rajan, economist and an international academician
- Amartya Sen, economist and philosopher
- Jim Toy, gay activist & educator
- Astrid S. Tuminez, Utah Valley University, President
- S. R. Srinivasa Varadhan, NYU mathematician
- Ocean Vuong, writer, poet, professor
- Thomas Zacharia, computational material sciences

=== Science ===
- Subrahmanyan Chandrasekhar, 1983 Nobel laureate in Physics.
- Min Chueh Chang, co-inventor of the combined oral contraceptive pill.
- Shiing-Shen Chern, mathematician and winner of the 1983 Wolf Prize for his work in differential geometry.
- Steven Chu, Nobel laureate in Physics in 1997 for research on cooling and trapping atoms using laser light and former United States Secretary of Energy.
- David D. Ho, HIV/AIDS researcher
- June Huh, mathematician, 2022 Fields Medal winner.
- Michio Kaku, theoretical physicist
- Har Gobind Khorana, shared the Nobel laureate in "Physiology or Medicine" in 1968 for work in genetics and protein synthesis.
- Tsung-Dao Lee, received the 1957 Nobel Laureate in Physics for work in particle physics along with Chen Ning Yang.
- Yuan T. Lee, 1986 Nobel Prize winner in Chemistry
- Syukuro Manabe, 2021 Nobel Laureate in Physics
- Shuji Nakamura, 2014 Nobel Laureate in Physics
- Yoichiro Nambu, 2008 Nobel laureate in Physics
- Lam M. Nguyen – computer scientist and applied mathematician
- Santa J. Ono, former President University of Cincinnati, immunologist and vision scientist, current President of University of Michigan
- Charles J. Pedersen, 1987 Nobel laureate in Chemistry.
- Ching W. Tang, inventor of the organic light-emitting diode and the hetero-junction organic photovoltaic cell. Winner of the 2011 Wolf Prize in Chemistry.
- Terence Tao, mathematician, 2006 Fields Medal winner.
- Samuel C.C. Ting, 1976 Nobel laureate in physics for discovering the existence of a new particle called j/psi.
- Roger Y. Tsien, 2008 Nobel Prize winner in chemistry, for the discovery of the green fluorescent protein.
- Daniel Tsui, 1998 Nobel laureate in Physics for contributions to the discovery of the fractional Quantum Hall effect.
- Chien-Shiung Wu, winner of the 1978 Wolf Prize in Physics. First woman to be elected president of American Physical Society.
- Chen Ning Yang, received the 1957 Nobel Laureate in Physics for work in particle physics along with Tsung-Dao Lee.
- Shing-Tung Yau, mathematician, 1982 Fields Medal winner.

== Arts/architecture/design ==
- Salma Arastu, artist
- Rina Banerjee, artist
- Temmie Chang, artist and video game designer
- David Choe, artist
- Yu-kai Chou, gamification designer and pioneer
- Dhairya Dand, inventor and artist
- George Fan, video game designer, Plants vs. Zombies
- Fazlur Rahman Khan, a Bangladeshi-American structural engineer and architect, who was considered the "Einstein of structural engeering", he was the designer of the Willis Tower and John Hancock Center
- Maya Lin, architect, designed the Vietnam Veterans Memorial
- Chanel Miller, artist
- Seong Moy, artist and printmaker
- Jane Ng, 3D environmental artist
- Yatin Patel, photographer and artist
- Gyo Obata, architect, designed the National Air and Space Museum
- IM Pei, renowned architect, designed the Rock and Roll Hall of Fame and the Louvre Pyramid
- Irene Mei Zhi Shum - Contemporary Art Curator
- Mimi So, jewelry designer
- Manick Sorcar, animator, artist
- Minoru Yamasaki, architect, designed the World Trade Center
- Vern Yip, interior designer, appeared on TLC's Trading Spaces and HGTV's Deserving Design and Design Star

== Business and industry ==
- Revathi Advaithi, CEO of Flex (company)
- Parag Agrawal, CEO of Twitter (2021–2022)
- Hiroaki Aoki, founder of Benihana
- Nikesh Arora, CEO of Palo Alto Networks
- Ramani Ayer, chairman and CEO of The Hartford Financial Services Group
- Somen Banerjee, founder of Chippendales
- Ajay Banga, president and CEO of MasterCard (2010–2020)
- Manoj Bhargava, billionaire founder and CEO of 5-hour Energy
- Sabeer Bhatia, co-founder of Hotmail
- Baiju Bhatt, co-founder of Robinhood
- Aneel Bhusri, CEO of Workday
- Sanjit Biswas, co-founder of Cisco Meraki
- Amar Bose, billionaire chairman and founder of Bose Corporation
- Do Won Chang, billionaire co-founder of Forever 21
- Fred Chang, Taiwanese American billionaire founder and CEO of Newegg
- Morris Chang, founder and chairman of Taiwan Semiconductor Manufacturing Company.
- Sam Chang, founder and CEO of McSam Hotel Group, one of largest hotel developers in New York City
- Albert Chao, billionaire co-founder and CEO of Westlake Chemical, largest producer LDPE plastic in the US
- Allen Chao, founder of Watson Pharmaceuticals
- Jay Chaudhry, CEO and founder of Zscaler
- Christine Chen, founder and CEO of Chen Communications
- Eva Chen, co-founder and CEO of Trend Micro
- John S. Chen, executive chairman and CEO of BlackBerry Limited, former CEO of Sybase
- Perry Chen, founder and CEO of Kickstarter
- Roger H. Chen, founder of 99 Ranch Market
- Steve Chen, co-founder of YouTube
- Tim Chen, co-founder and CEO of NerdWallet
- Chen Wen-ch'i, billionaire president and CEO of VIA Technologies, husband of Cher Wang, co-founder of HTC
- Andrew Cherng, billionaire co-founder of Panda Express
- Peggy Cherng, billionaire co-founder of Panda Express
- David Chu, co-founder of Nautica
- James Chu, founder of ViewSonic
- Alfred Chuang, founder and CEO of BEA Systems
- Francisco D'Souza, former CEO of Cognizant
- Weili Dai, billionaire and co-founder of Marvel Technology Group
- Bharat Desai, billionaire co-founder of Syntel
- Shar Dubey, CEO of Match Group
- Tan Hock Eng, CEO of Broadcom, and highest earning CEO in the US in 2017
- Vishal Garg (businessman), CEO of Better.com
- Rajat Gupta, former Worldwide Managing Director (chief executive) of McKinsey & Company
- Daniel Ha, co-founder of Disqus
- David T. Hon, founder of Dahon
- Ming Hsieh, billionaire and philanthropist founder of Cogent Systems acquired by 3M
- Tony Hsieh, CEO of Zappos, internet entrepreneur and venture capitalist
- Jen-Hsun Huang, billionaire co-founder and CEO of NVIDIA
- Robert T. Huang, founder of Synnex
- Shelly Hwang, co-founder of Pinkberry
- Kai Huang, co-founder and CEO of Guitar Hero and RedOctane
- Subrah Iyar, co-founder of Cisco Webex
- David Ji, co-founder of Apex Digital
- Andrea Jung, retired chairman and CEO of Avon Products
- Johnny Kan, founder of Kan's Restaurant
- Justin Kan, co-founder of Twitch
- Min Kao, billionaire co-founder of Garmin
- John Kapoor, billionaire founder of Insys
- Jawed Karim, co-founder of YouTube
- Farooq Kathwari, CEO of Ethan Allen (company)
- Shahid Khan, billionaire president of Flex-N-Gate Corp., owner of the Jacksonville Jaguars
- Tony Khan, CEO and co-founder of All Elite Wrestling
- Vinod Khosla, billionaire co-founding CEO of Sun Microsystems and general partner of venture capital firm Kleiner, Perkins, Caufield & Byers
- Hoang Kieu, billionaire Vietnamese-American owner of Shanghai RAAS Blood Products
- Jeong H. Kim, co-founder and CEO, Yurie Systems (sold to Lucent for $1.1 billion)
- James Kim, billionaire founder and executive chairman of Amkor Technology
- George Kurian, CEO of NetApp
- Arvind Krishna, Chairman and CEO of IBM
- David Lam, founder of Lam Research
- Brian Lee, co-founder of LegalZoom, The Honest Company and ShoeDazzle
- David Lee, founder of Jamison Services, largest real estate private office landlord in the country
- Kai-Fu Lee, founding president of Google China
- Noel Lee, founder of Monster Cable
- Thai Lee, billionaire Thai-born Korean American co-founder and CEO of SHI International Corp, largest woman-owned business in the US
- Christine Liang, president and founder of ASI Corp.
- Kenneth Lin, co-founder of Credit Karma
- Eric Ly, multi-millionaire co-founder of LinkedIn, founder of Pserdo match
- Kumar Malavalli, co-founder of Brocade Communications Systems
- Sheila Lirio Marcelo, founder and former CEO and chairwoman of Care.com.
- Sandeep Mathrani, CEO of WeWork
- Sanjay Mehrotra, co-founder of SanDisk, president and CEO of Micron Technology
- Apoorva Mehta, co-founder of Instacart
- Ivan Menezes, CEO of Diageo
- Teresa H. Meng, founder of Atheros Communications acquired by Qualcomm and formed Qualcomm Atheros
- Neal Mohan, CEO of YouTube
- Moon Kook-jin, founder of Kahr Arms, manufacturer of the Desert Eagle
- Bobby Murphy, billionaire co-founder of Snapchat
- Satya Nadella, Chairman and CEO of Microsoft
- Laxman Narasimhan, Designated CEO of Starbucks (2023–2024)
- Shantanu Narayen, Chairman and CEO of Adobe Systems
- Indra Nooyi, Chairman and CEO of PepsiCo (2006–2018)
- Ellen Pao, former CEO of Reddit
- James Park, co-founder and CEO of Fitbit
- Vikram Pandit, president and CEO of Citigroup
- Kim Pegula, co-owner of Buffalo Bills and CEO of Pegula Sports and Entertainment
- Sundar Pichai, CEO of Alphabet (Google)
- Christine Poon, former vice chairman of Johnson & Johnson and worldwide chairman of J&J's Pharmaceuticals Group
- Ritu Raj, founder of Wag Hotels
- Raj Rajaratnam, billionaire founder of Galleon Group
- Vivek Ranadivé, founder of TIBCO Software and owner of Sacramento Kings
- Punit Renjen, CEO of Deloitte
- Steve Sanghi, founder, chairman and CEO of Microchip Technology
- Niraj Shah, billionaire co-founder and CEO of Wayfair
- Ram Shriram, billionaire co-founder of Junglee.com and early investor in Google
- John J. Sie, founder of Starz Inc.
- Ben Silbermann, billionaire co-founder and CEO of Pinterest
- Pradeep Sindhu, founder of Juniper Networks
- Patrick Soon-Shiong, billionaire surgeon and founder of Abraxis BioScience and owner of the Los Angeles Times
- K. R. Sridhar, founder and CEO of Bloom Energy
- Lisa Su, president and CEO of Advanced Micro Devices
- Raj Subramaniam, president and CEO of FedEx
- Anjali Sud, CEO of Vimeo
- David Sun, billionaire Taiwanese American co-founder of Kingston Technology
- Rajeev Suri, CEO of Nokia
- Sehat Sutardja, CEO of Marvell Technology Group
- Sonia Syngal, CEO of Gap Inc.
- Lip-Bu Tan, president and CEO of Cadence Design Systems
- Wayne Ting, CEO of Lime
- Janie Tsao, co-founder of Linksys
- Victor Tsao, co-founder of Linksys
- Greg Tseng, co-founder of Tagged
- Kevin Tsujihara, chairman and CEO of Warner Bros.
- John Tu, billionaire Taiwanese American co-founder of Kingston Technologies
- Jayshree Ullal, CEO of Arista Networks
- Romesh T. Wadhwani, billionaire founder of Symphony Technology Group
- An Wang, founder of Wang Laboratories
- Charles B. Wang, co-founder and former CEO of Computer Associates International, Inc.
- Niniane Wang, technology executive
- Roger Wang, billionaire founder chairman of Golden Eagle International Group
- William Wang, billionaire Taiwanese American co-founder and CEO of Vizio
- Padmasree Warrior, CEO of Fable and former CTO of Cisco and Motorola
- Andrea Wong, president and CEO of Lifetime Networks
- Yishan Wong, former CEO of Reddit
- Sheryl WuDunn, won Pulitzer Prize at The New York Times in 1990; currently, an investment banker
- Jeff Yang, co-founded A Magazine in 1989 and is a columnist for the San Francisco Chronicle.
- Jerry Yang, Taiwanese American billionaire and co-founder and former CEO of Yahoo!
- Bing Yeh, co-founder of Silicon Storage Technology, acquired by Microchip Technology and Greenliant Systems
- Gideon Yu, co-owner of San Francisco 49ers and former CFO of Facebook and YouTube
- Eric S. Yuan, billionaire founder and CEO of Zoom Video Communications, founding engineer at Webex, Ranked No. 1 of Top CEOs in 2018 of a large company on Glassdoor
- Min Zhu, co-founder and former president and chief technical officer of WebEx.

== Entertainment ==
- Ruben A. Aquino, animation director, supervising animator for Walt Disney Animation Studios
- Chang and Eng Bunker, source for the term "Siamese Twins"
- Ping Chong, theater director, choreographer, video and installation artist
- Shin Lim, close-up magician
- Alain Nu, mentalist, magician

=== Actors and filmmakers ===
- Keiko Agena, actress, Gilmore Girls
- Philip Ahn, actor often considered the first Korean American in Hollywood
- Asa Akira, pornographic actress
- Aubrey Anderson-Emmons, actress, Modern Family
- Aziz Ansari, actor and comedian, Human Giant and Parks and Recreation: Television series Funny People and I Love You, Man: Films
- Lulu Antariksa, actress
- Devon Aoki, actress and model
- Tsuru Aoki (1892–1961), actress
- Gregg Araki, filmmaker, Mysterious Skin, The Doom Generation
- Geoffrey Arend, actor, Body of Proof
- Ashley Argota, actress, True Jackson, VP
- Reiko Aylesworth, actress, 24
- Dave Bautista, actor
- Chloe Bennet (née Wang), actress, Agents of S.H.I.E.L.D. singer
- Kayla Blake, actress
- Moon Bloodgood, actress
- Johnny Yong Bosch, actor
- Dante Basco, actor, poet, dancer, Hook, The Debut, Biker Boyz and Take the Lead
- Dion Basco, actor, The Debut, Biker Boyz and City Guys
- Ross Butler, actor
- Eric Byler, filmmaker
- Steve Byrne, comedian and actor
- Dean Cain, actor
- David Callaham, screenwriter, producer
- Tia Carrere, actress and singer, Relic Hunter, Wayne's World and Wayne's World 2
- Miya Cech, actress, The Darkest Minds
- Christina Chang, actress
- Katie Chang, actress, The Bling Ring
- Wah Chang, prop designer, famous for designing the original Star Trek communicator and phasers
- Ian Chen, American actor
- Rosalind Chao, actress
- François Chau, actor
- Hong Chau, actress, Downsizing and The Whale
- Joan Chen, actress, director
- Lynn Chen, actress
- Tina Chen, actress
- Karin Anna Cheung, actress
- Richard Chew, Academy Award-winning film editor
- Ronny Chieng, comedian and actor, The Daily Show
- Arden Cho, actress (Teen Wolf), YouTuber, model, singer
- Henry Cho, comedian
- John Cho, actor, FlashForward, Selfie, Better Luck Tomorrow, Harold & Kumar Go to White Castle, Star Trek
- Margaret Cho, actress and comedian
- SungWon Cho, YouTube personality and actor, BlackBerry and KPop Demon Hunters
- Kenneth Choi, actor
- Justin Chon, actor
- Kelsey Chow, actress
- Jamie Chung, actress
- Peter Chung, animator, Aeon Flux
- Michael Copon, actor
- Eugene Cordero, actor
- Billy Crawford, actor, host television
- Destin Daniel Cretton, film director, screenwriter, producer, editor (Shang-Chi and the Legend of the Ten Rings)
- Darren Criss, actor and singer
- Tom Cross, Academy Award-winning film editor (for Whiplash)
- Jake Cuenca, actor, model
- Mark Dacascos, actor, of the Crying Freeman and the "Chairman" from Iron Chef America
- Noureen DeWulf, actress, Starred in an Academy Award-winning short film
- Ivan Dorschner, actor, model
- James Duval, actor
- Dayyan Eng, director, writer, producer (Bus 44, Waiting Alone, Inseparable)
- Yvonne Elliman, singer
- Maya Erskine, actress and writer, Pen15 and Blue Eye Samurai
- Roger Fan, actor
- Nargis Fakhri, actress and model
- Raja Fenske, actor
- Mark Fischbach, YouTube personality, filmmaker and actor, Villainous and Iron Lung
- Ray Gallardo, cinematographer, Friend of the World and A Corpse in Kensington
- Janina Gavankar, actress
- Kimiko Glenn, actress
- Griffin Gluck, actor
- Mark-Paul Gosselaar, actor, Saved by the Bell and NYPD Blue
- Cynthia Gouw, actress, Star Trek V-The Final Frontier
- Rene Gube, writer and actor
- Todd Haberkorn, voice actor
- Kayo Hatta (1958–2005), filmmaker
- Sessue Hayakawa (1889–1973), Academy Award-nominated actor
- Daniel Henney, actor in South Korea, X-Men Origins: Wolverine
- Ryan Higa, YouTube personality
- Steven Ho, stuntman, stunt coordinator, fight choreographer
- James Hong, actor
- James Wong Howe (1899–1976), two-time-Academy Award-winning cinematographer
- Tiffany Ann Hsu, actress
- Kelly Hu, actress
- Tina Huang, stage and television actress
- Vanessa Anne Hudgens, actress and singer
- David Henry Hwang, Tony-winning playwright
- Robert Ito, classic movie actor
- Jaiden Animations, YouTube personality
- Ken Jeong, comedian, actor, physician, The Hangover and Community
- Malese Jow, actress and singer
- Rodney Kageyama, actor
- Mindy Kaling, actress, writer, producer, The Office
- Michael Kang, filmmaker
- Sung Kang, actor, Better Luck Tomorrow and Fast & Furious
- Tim Kang, actor, The Mentalist
- Ravi Kapoor, actor, Crossing Jordan
- Archie Kao, actor, Power Rangers Lost Galaxy and CSI
- Julia Kato, actress Rugrats
- Janice Kawaye, voice actress
- Dai Sil Kim-Gibson, documentary filmmaker
- Daniel Dae Kim, actor, Lost and Hawaii Five-0
- Randall Duk Kim, actor
- Matthew Yang King, actor and voice actor
- Zach King, internet personality
- Hayley Kiyoko, actress
- Aramis Knight, actor, Runt and Ms. Marvel
- Alex Ko, actor and filmmaker, Billy Elliot the Musical and The Yellow Dress
- Jo Koy, comedian
- Shin Koyamada, actor, The Last Samurai and Wendy Wu: Homecoming Warrior
- Lance Krall, actor and comedian
- Michelle Krusiec, actress
- Nancy Kwan, actress
- Jennie Kwan, actress, California Dreams
- Liza Lapira, actress
- Cung Le, kickboxer, martial artist, and actor
- Sharon Leal, actress, Guiding Light and Boston Public
- Ang Lee, filmmaker and director, Brokeback Mountain, Hulk, Eat Drink Man Woman, Crouching Tiger, Hidden Dragon
- Bobby Lee, comedian and actor, MADtv and Reservation Dogs.
- Brandon Lee (1965–1993), actor, son of Bruce Lee
- Bruce Lee (1940–1973), martial arts superstar
- Chris Chan Lee, filmmaker
- C. S. Lee, actor, Dexter
- James Kyson Lee, actor, Heroes
- Jason Scott Lee, actor
- Ki Hong Lee, actor, The Maze Runner, Unbreakable Kimmy Schmidt, Everything Before Us
- Shannon Lee, actress, daughter of Bruce Lee
- Lee Tung Foo, Vaudeville performer and actor
- Will Yun Lee, actor, Witchblade and Bionic Woman
- Ken Leung, actor, Lost, Shanghai Kiss and Star Wars: The Force Awakens
- Matthew Libatique, Oscar-nominated cinematographer
- Tiffany Limos, actress
- Justin Lin, filmmaker, The Fast and the Furious: Tokyo Drift, Fast & Furious, Fast Five, Fast & Furious 6
- Tao Lin, novelist and poet
- Bai Ling, actress
- Julia Ling, actress, Chuck
- Dallas Liu, actor, Avatar: The Last Airbender
- Lucy Liu, Chinese/American actress
- Kamala Lopez, actress
- Mako (1933–2006) Academy Award- and Tony Award-nominated actor, founder of East West Players
- Aasif Mandvi, actor and comedian, The Daily Show
- Dhar Mann, entrepreneur and YouTube personality
- Marie Matiko, actress
- Young Mazino, actor Beef
- Nobu McCarthy (1934–2002), actress
- Mei Melancon, actress, writer and producer
- Charles Melton, actor
- Sam Milby, actor singer
- Hasan Minhaj, actor, comedian, TV host
- Vanessa Minnillo
- Shay Mitchell, actress
- Matthew Moy, comedian, actor, artist
- Mira Nair, film director and producer
- Robert A. Nakamura, pioneering filmmaker, teacher, co-founder of Visual Communications (VC)
- Aparna Nancherla, actress
- Kumail Nanjiani, comedian and actor, Franklin & Bash
- Minae Noji, actress, General Hospital
- Paolo Montalban, actor of Filipino descent
- Pat Morita (1932–2005), comedian and Academy Award-nominated actor best known for work on Happy Days and The Karate Kid
- Olivia Munn, actress, model and television personality
- Hiro Murai, filmmaker
- Dr. Haing S. Ngor (1940–1996) won the Academy Award for Best Supporting Actor in 1985.
- Derek Nguyen, filmmaker
- Dustin Nguyen, actor, 21 Jump Street and V.I.P.
- Qui Nguyen, playwright, television writer, and screenwriter
- Steve Nguyen, film producer
- Julia Nickson, actress
- Eva Noblezada, actress, singer
- Rahsaan Noor, actor and filmmaker, Bengali Beauty
- Dennis Oh, model, actor
- Sandra Oh, actress, Grey's Anatomy
- Masi Oka, actor
- Yuji Okumoto, actor, The Karate Kid Part II and Johnny Tsunami, writer and producer
- Lisa Onodera, film producer
- Maulik Pancholy, actor, Weeds and 30 Rock
- Ashley Park, actress, Emily in Paris, Joy Ride
- Grace Park, actress, Battlestar Galactica, Edgemont, and Hawaii Five-0
- Linda Park, actress, Star Trek: Enterprise
- Randall Park, actor, comedian and writer, Fresh Off the Boat, The Interview and Everything Before Us
- Steve Park, actor and comedian
- Janel Parrish, actress and singer
- Kal Penn, actor, Harold & Kumar Go to White Castle
- Dat Phan, comedian, winner of the first season of Last Comic Standing
- Ryan Potter, actor
- Danny Pudi, actor, Community
- Lou Diamond Phillips, actor
- Lindsay Price, actress
- Maggie Q, actress
- Ke Huy Quan, Academy Award-winning actor, Everything Everywhere All at Once
- Sendhil Ramamurthy, actor, Heroes
- Navi Rawat, actress, Numbers and The O.C.
- Keanu Reeves, actor and philanthropist
- Ernie Reyes Jr., actor and martial arts expert
- Rob Schneider, actor and comedian
- Joe Seo, actor, Cobra Kai
- Parry Shen, actor
- Sheetal Sheth, actress
- James Shigeta, actor
- Sab Shimono, actor
- Zenobia Shroff, actress and comedienne
- Harry Shum Jr., actor
- Shannyn Sossamon, actress
- Brenda Song, actress
- Karan Soni, actor, Deadpool film series and Spider-Man: Across the Spider-Verse
- Sonja Sohn, actress, The Wire
- Jack Soo, actor
- Booboo Stewart, actor
- Jiaoying Summers, comedian and actress
- Pat Suzuki, actress and singer
- Cary-Hiroyuki Tagawa, actor
- Faran Tahir, actor
- George Takei, actor of Star Trek fame, LGBT activist
- Chris Tashima, actor, Academy Award-winning filmmaker
- Brian Tee, actor, Chicago Med
- Jennifer Tilly, actress (born in California)
- Meg Tilly, actress
- Chuti Tiu, actress, Desire, 24, Dragnet, Beautiful, The Specials, former America's Junior Miss (first non-White winner)
- Tamlyn Tomita, actress
- Lauren Tom, voice actress
- Kelly Marie Tran, Star Wars actress
- Thalia Tran, actress
- Thuy Trang, actress, Mighty Morphin Power Rangers (1973–2001)
- Daisuke Tsuji, actor
- Miyoshi Umeki, Oscar-winning actress and singer
- Jenna Ushkowitz, actress
- Dilshad Vadsaria, actress, Greek
- Daya Vaidya, actress
- Bee Vang, actor
- Lalaine Vergara-Paras, actress and singer, Lizzie McGuire
- Ben Wang, actor, American Born Chinese and Karate Kid: Legends
- Garrett Wang (王以瞻), actor on Star Trek: Voyager
- Lulu Wang, filmmaker
- Wayne Wang, film director, The Joy Luck Club
- Miriam Weeks, pornographic actress
- Ming-Na Wen, actress ER, Stargate Universe and As the World Turns
- Ali Wong, comedian and actress
- Anna May Wong (1905–1961), actress
- BD Wong, Tony Award-winning actor, Oz and Law and Order: Special Victims Unit
- Freddie Wong, filmmaker, musician, VFX artist, podcaster, and competitive gamer
- Jimmy Wong, actor and musician
- Russell Wong (王盛德), actor
- Victor Wong (黃自強), Hollywood actor
- Alice Wu, filmmaker
- Constance Wu, Taiwanese American actress, Fresh Off the Boat and Crazy Rich Asians
- Daniel Wu, actor, director and producer, Into the Badlands and Europa Report
- Kevin Wu, YouTube personality
- Leonard Wu, actor
- Patti Yasutake, actress
- Steven Yeun, actor, The Walking Dead
- Michelle Yeoh, actress
- Christopher Makoto Yogi, filmmaker
- Aaron Yoo, actor, 21 and Everything Before Us
- Ji-young Yoo, actress, Expats and Until Dawn
- Keone Young, actor and voice actor
- Jessica Yu, Oscar-winning film director
- Kelvin Yu, actor and writer
- Ron Yuan, actor and voice actor
- Jennifer Yuh Nelson, film and television director, Kung Fu Panda 2 and Love, Death & Robots
- Rick Yune, actor

=== Choreographers and dancers ===
- Stella Abrera, ballerina
- Dana Tai Soon Burgess, cultural figure, choreographer, performance artist
- Carrie Ann Inaba, dancer, choreographer
- Michio Itō, choreographer
- George Lee (dancer), New York City Ballet's first Asian dancer
- Sono Osato (1919–2018), ballerina
- Brian Puspos, dancer, choreographer
- Ken San Jose, dancer, choreographer
- Bailey Sok, dancer, choreographer

=== Music ===
- Jhené Aiko, singer-songwriter
- Toshiko Akiyoshi, jazz pianist, composer/arranger, and bandleader
- Nadia Ali, member of music group iiO
- Tatyana Ali, Indo-Trinidadian singer and actress
- Paul Anka, singer-songwriter
- Steve Aoki electro house, musician, record producer and the founder of Dim Mak Records
- Betsy Arakawa, pianist
- Sameer Bhattacharya, guitarist in the Texas alternative rock band Flyleaf
- Michelle Branch, singer-songwriter
- Robert Campman, hip hop artist
- Angelin Chang, Grammy Award-winning pianist and renown music professor
- Jeff Chang, music critic and historian of hip-hop culture
- Tim Chantarangsu, rapper, comedian, and videographer
- China Mac, rapper and activist
- Peter Chung, rapper and producer
- Jocelyn Enriquez
- Dia Frampton, former Meg & Dia singer
- Ming Freeman, keyboardist/pianist
- Lisa Furukawa, Japanese-American folk singer-songwriter, and pianist
- Midori Gotō, classical violinist and recipient of the Avery Fisher Prize
- Joseph Hahn, DJ in Linkin Park
- Kirk Hammett, lead guitarist of Metallica
- Matt Heafy, guitarist and vocal of band Trivium
- Nichkhun Horvejkul, member of South Korean boy group 2PM
- Magdalen Hsu-Li, out bisexual Chinese American singer-songwriter recording artist, poet and artist
- Chad Hugo, musician and producer, member of The Neptunes and N.E.R.D
- Hao Huang (pianist), pianist and professor at Scripps College
- William Hung, contestant from American Idol
- Tiffany Hwang, Korean American member of girl group SNSD
- Ramon Ibanga Jr., hip hop producer
- Enrique Iglesias, mother, Isabel Preysler, is Filipino
- James Iha, formerly the guitarist of The Smashing Pumpkins
- Vijay Iyer, pianist
- Jon Jang, jazz pianist, composer, and bandleader
- Clarence Jey, Grammy, Billboard credited songwriter, record producer
- MC Jin, pioneer in the Asian-American hip-hop scene
- Norah Jones, musician, Grammy Award winner, daughter of Ravi Shankar
- Jessica Jung, Korean American member of girl group SNSD
- Krystal Jung, member of South Korean girl group f(x)
- Nicole Jung, member of South Korean girl group KARA
- Scott Jung, (Also known as The Magnificent Butcher) hip hop producer, rapper
- Tony Kanal, Two-time Grammy Award winner, bass player for No Doubt
- Michael Kang (musician), mandolin player, violinist, and vocalist for String Cheese Incident, is South Korean
- Jeff Kashiwa, smooth jazz saxophonist
- Keshi, lofi, hiphop, R&B, alternative, singer/songwriter/producer/instrumentalist
- Dennis Kim, underground rapper and spoken word artist
- Eli Kim, member of South Korean boy group U-KISS
- Raja Kumari, singer-songwriter, rapper
- Sunny Lee, Korean American member of girl group SNSD
- Sean Lennon, singer and songwriter, son of English John Lennon and Japanese Yoko Ono, who holds both British and American citizenship
- Amber Josephine Liu, member of South Korean girl group f(x)
- Nora Lum, rapper known as Awkwafina
- Yo-Yo Ma, renowned cellist
- Baiyu, singer-songwriter
- Bruno Mars, singer-songwriter music producer
- Nancy McDonie, member of girl group Momoland
- Zubin Mehta, conductor, New York Philharmonic Orchestra
- Nicki Minaj, Indo-Trinidadian rap artist
- Charles Mingus, jazz double bassist, composer, band leader
- Daniel Nakamura, hip hop producer and founder of 75 Ark
- Eric Nam, Korean-American singer, active in South Korea under B2M Entertainment
- Martin Nievera, singer-songwriter and TV host
- Justin Nozuka, singer-songwriter
- Karen O, singer of Yeah Yeah Yeahs
- Kero One, hip hop MC and producer
- Seiji Ozawa, Boston Symphony conductor
- Anderson Paak, singer, rapper, producer
- Will Pan, singer-songwriter
- Jay Park, Korean-American singer, rapper, bboy and actor. Also famous in South Korea as the former leader of South Korean boyband 2 pm.
- Jonathan Park, rapper and actor
- Lena Park, composer, singer-songwriter
- Mike Park, was the singer of Skankin Pickle and currently runs Asian Man Records
- Allan Pineda (Lindo) of The Black Eyed Peas
- Richard Quitevis, turntablist and composer
- A. R. Rahman, Grammy Award-winning composer/arranger, songwriter, and music producer
- Larry Ramos, guitarist, banjo player, and vocalist with the 1960s American pop band the Association
- Mike Relm, scratch video DJ who has toured with the Blue Man Group
- Olivia Rodrigo, singer-songwriter and actress
- Amerie Mi Marie Rogers, R&B/pop singer
- Kelis Rogers, R&B singer
- Nicole Scherzinger, singer and former member of The Pussycat Dolls
- Laura Shigihara, singer-songwriter, and programmer
- Shing02, recording artist known as Shingo Annen
- Mike Shinoda co-founder of Linkin Park
- Shaffer Chimere Smith, R&B singer-songwriter, and actor
- Rajé Shwari, singer
- Michael Stevenson, rapper
- Vienna Teng, folk and pop singer-songwriter
- Kim Thayil, guitarist for Grammy Award-winning rock group Soundgarden
- Trish Thuy Trang, Vietnamese American singer-songwriter, and entrepreneur
- Mark Tuan, member of South Korean boyband Got7
- Hikaru Utada, Japanese-American singer-songwriter active in both Japan and United States; her single Devil Inside topped the U.S. Billboard Dance Chart.
- Alex and Eddie Van Halen, members of rock band Van Halen, whose mother was of Indonesian ancestry
- Casandra Ventura, R&B singer
- Joanna Wang, singer-songwriter
- Leehom Wang, Taiwanese American singer-songwriter, record producer, and actor
- Shawn Wasabi, producer and electronic instrument designer
- William Joseph Williams, singer-songwriter, music producer
- Gabriella Sarmiento Wilson, singer-songwriter
- Only Won, rapper, beatboxer, actor, filmmaker (first bilingual Chinese American rapper)
- Kiki Wong, guitarist
- Kevin Woo, member of South Korean boy group U-KISS
- Vanness Wu, singer-songwriter and rapper
- Catalina Yue, Chinese-Japanese-American pop singer-songwriter
- Brandon Jermaine Yun, rapper and former radio personality

==== Groups/bands ====
- Aziatix, R&B, pop, soul, hip hop group
- Blue Scholars
- Far East Movement, first Asian-American group to be in the Top 10 in Mainstream Pop charts
- Fort Minor
- IAMMEDIC
- KeyKool & DJ Rhettmatic, pioneer Asian American hip hop group
- Mountain Brothers, hip hop group
- Paperdoll, indie band from NYC fronted by Asian American Teresa Lee
- The Slants, first all Asian American dance rock band/victors in a major U.S. Supreme Court case

=== Reality TV participants ===
- Natalie Anderson – The Amazing Race contestant and Survivor: San Juan del Sur winner
- Nadiya Anderson – The Amazing Race and Survivor: San Juan del Sur contestant
- Raj Bhakta – The Apprentice 2 contestant
- Yau-Man Chan – Survivor: Fiji contestant
- Jamie Chung – house mate on MTV's The Real World: San Diego.
- Catherine Giudici – The Bachelor (season 17) winner
- Christine Ha – MasterChef season 3 winner
- Angelica Hale – America's Got Talent (season 12) runner-up
- Maria Ho – The Amazing Race 15 contestant
- Ken Hoang – Survivor: Gabon contestant.
- James Holzhauer – Jeopardy! champion. Holzhauer's grandmother was Japanese.
- Hung Huynh – Top Chef (season 3) winner
- Jabbawockeez – Winners of America's Best Dance Crew (season 1)
- Tammy and Victor Jih – winners of The Amazing Race 14
- Zach King – The Amazing Race 28
- Kristen Kish – Top Chef (season 11) winner
- Yul Kwon – Survivor: Cook Islands winner
- Kodi Lee – America's Got Talent (season 14) winner
- Sanjaya Malakar – American Idol (season 6) finalist
- Poreotics – Winners of America's Best Dance Crew (season 5)
- Quest Crew – Winners of America's Best Dance Crew (season 3)
- Jessica Sanchez – American Idol (season 11) runner up and winner of America's Got Talent season 20
- James Sun – The Apprentice 6 runner-up
- Tila Tequila – A Shot at Love with Tila Tequila star
- Jenn Tran – The Bachelorette star
- Jasmine Trias – American Idol (season 3) finalist
- Elyse Umemoto – Survivor: South Pacific contestant
- Kevin Wu – The Amazing Race 17 contestant
- Albert Tsai, American actor
- Nymphia Wind- Winner of RuPaul's drag race (season 16)

== Fashion ==
- Tyson Beckford, model and actor
- Malan Breton, fashion designer
- Richard Chai, fashion designer
- Angel Chang, fashion designer
- Wenlan Chia, fashion designer
- Doug Chiang, movie design and fashion designer
- Monika Chiang, fashion designer
- Jimmy Choo, fashion designer and founder of Jimmy Choo Ltd
- Doo-Ri Chung, fashion designer
- Chloe Dao, fashion designer and winner of Project Runway (season 2)
- Diana Eng, fashion designer and contestant on Project Runway (season 2)
- Karenina Sunny Halim, model
- Joe Allen Hong, fashion designer for Neiman Marcus
- Chanel Iman, supermodel with Korean and African American descent
- Jen Kao, fashion designer
- Naeem Khan, fashion designer
- Derek Lam, fashion designer
- Humberto Leon and Carol Lim, fashion designers and retailers
- Phillip Lim, fashion designer
- Monique Lhuillier, fashion designer
- Jay Manuel, creative director and make-up artist
- Kelsey Merritt, fashion model
- Josie Natori, fashion designer
- Jeff Ng, fashion designer and creator of Staple Design
- Mary Ping, fashion designer
- Cynthia Sakai, fashion designer
- Kimora Lee Simmons, supermodel with Japanese and African American descent
- Peter Som, fashion designer
- Anna Sui, fashion designer
- Vivienne Tam, fashion designer
- Chrissy Teigen, model, TV host
- Alexander Wang, fashion designer
- Vera Wang, fashion designer
- Jason Wu, fashion designer
- Luly Yang, fashion designer
- Prabal Gurung, fashion designer

== Culinary ==
- David Chang, founder of the Momofuku restaurant group and in multiple television shows
- Joyce Chen, popularized northern-style Chinese cuisine in the United States
- Cecilia Chiang (江孫芸), founder of the Mandarin Restaurant. Chiang's son, Philip Chiang, is the co-founder of restaurant chain P. F. Chang's China Bistro
- Roy Choi, creator of the gourmet Korean taco truck, Kogi
- Cristeta Comerford, White House Executive Chef, won with Bobby Flay in an Iron Chef America challenge
- Soleil Ho, chef, food writer, host of podcast "The Racist Sandwich", and restaurant critic
- Eddie Huang, chef and author of Fresh Off the Boat
- Madhur Jaffrey, James Beard award-winning food and travel writer, and television personality
- Padma Lakshmi, cookbook author and host of Top Chef and Host of "Taste the Nation with Padma Lakshmi"
- Francis Lam, host of The Splendid Table and food journalist
- Andrew Le (chef), Chef, Hale ‘Aina Award for the "Restaurateur of the Year" in 2017 James Beard Foundation Award semifinalist in 2023 and 2024
- Lynja, chef behind "Cooking with Lynja" YouTube channel
- Emily Kim, creator and host of popular YouTube channel Maangchi, teaching Korean cooking
- Masako Morishita, James Beard Foundation's 2024 Emerging Chef
- Melissa Miranda, James Beard Award semifinalist chef of Filipino restaurant Musang in Seattle
- Niki Nakayama, chef and owner of Michelin-starred n/naka restaurant
- Tam Pham, MICHELIN Guide Florida 2024 Young Chef Award Winner and owner of a Michelin Bib Gourmand restaurant
- Mutsuko Soma, James Beard Award semifinalist chef specializing in handmade soba, owner of Kamonegi in Seattle
- Jet Tila, celebrity chef and restaurateur and guest on “Cutthroat Kitchen”
- Roy Yamaguchi, owner of Roy's Restaurants
- Martin Yan, chef and food writer, hosted his award-winning PBS-TV cooking show Yan Can Cook since 1982
- Jennifer Yee, award-winning, James Beard, nominated pastry chef
- Molly Yeh, cookbook author and blogger

== Law ==
- John Aiso, first Japanese American judge in the continental U.S. (Also see Military below).
- Preeta D. Bansal, Solicitor General for the State of New York (1999–2002).
- Norman Bay, U.S. Attorney for the District of New Mexico (2000–2002), and the first Chinese-American to hold such a U.S. Attorney position.
- Hong Yen Chang, first Asian American licensed to practice law in the U.S. (1888).
- Herbert Choy, first Asian American federal judge (1971).
- Morgan Chu, prominent litigator and former Managing Partner of Irell & Manella.
- Viet D. Dinh, United States Assistant Attorney General and a key drafter of what became the USA PATRIOT Act.
- Heather Fong, chief of police of San Francisco Police Department, and the first Asian American woman to head a major metropolitan police department.
- Noel Francisco, 47th Solicitor General of the United States
- Sei Fujii, graduate of USC law and advocate for Asian American issues despite denial of bar admission due to discrimination. Posthumously granted law license in 2017.
- James C. Ho, lawyer, Juris Doctor of Texas general judge on Texas appeal & for Texas judge weddings permission
- Robert K. Hur, U.S. Attorney for the District of Maryland (2018–2021).
- Todd Kim, first Solicitor General for the District of Columbia.
- Harold Hongju Koh, dean of Yale Law School (July 1, 2004 – March 23, 2009).
- Arsalan Iftikhar, international human rights lawyer, founder of TheMuslimGuy
- Lance Ito, judge in the OJ Simpson trial.
- Joyce L. Kennard, justice of the Supreme Court of California.
- Yuri Kochiyama, civil rights activist.
- Fred Korematsu, prominent resister of Japanese American internment.
- Carol Lam, U.S. Attorney for the Southern District of California (2002–2007)
- David Lat, attorney and blogger for the sites "Underneath Their Robes" and "Above the Law."
- William F. Lee, co-managing partner of the international law firm of WilmerHale.
- Jessie K. Liu, current U.S. Attorney for the District of Columbia
- Dale Minami, attorney who helped reverse Fred Korematsu's criminal conviction.
- Paul Tanaka, former mayor of Gardena, California, and undersheriff of the Los Angeles County Sheriff's Department.
- Rachel Paulose, U.S. Attorney for the District of Minnesota. She is the first Indian American woman, the youngest attorney, and the first woman in Minnesota to hold this post.
- Simon Tam, author, activist, and founder of The Slants; litigant in Matal v. Tam.
- Mary Tape, desegregation activist who fought for Chinese-Americans' access to education, notably in the case Tape v. Hurley in 1885.
- Kathryn Doi Todd, first Asian American female judge (1978).
- Frank H. Wu, distinguished professor and chancellor & dean of UC Hastings; dean of Wayne State University Law School.
- Bruce Yamashita, attorney and U.S. Marine Corps officer who worked to expose racial discrimination within the Corps.
- Debra Wong Yang, U.S. Attorney for the Central District of California, and the first Asian American female to serve as a U.S. Attorney.
- Minoru Yasui, World War II-era lawyer who fought the legality of the incarceration of Japanese Americans during the war. Posthumously awarded the Presidential Medal of Freedom in 2015.

== Literature ==
- Alfredo Alcala – Filipino comic book artist
- Peter Bacho – author of the American Book Award-winning novel Cebu
- Lynda Barry – cartoonist of partial Filipino descent, most known for Ernie Pook's Comeek and Marlys, published in Salon.com and other independent papers
- Carlos Bulosan – author, "America Is In the Heart"
- Regie Cabico – notable slam poet and performer
- Jorge Cham – author of PhD Comics
- Ernie Chan – comic book artist/inker for Marvel Comics and DC Comics.
- Eileen Chang – writer
- Lan Samantha Chang – writer; director of the Iowa Writer's Workshop
- Cherry Chevapravatdumrong – writer, Family Guy
- Frank Chin (趙健秀) – novelist, playwright, and essayist
- Kah Kyung Cho – philosopher at SUNY University
- Amy Chua – writer and Harvard professor
- Melissa de la Cruz – author of teen lit series Au Pairs, The Ashleys and Blue Bloods
- Tony DeZuniga – co-creator of Jonah Hex
- Ben Fee – writer and labor organizer
- Don Figueroa – comic book artist for IDW Publishing and Dreamwave Entertainment, working on various Transformers titles.
- Larry Hama – comic book writer for Marvel, DC, IDW Publishing, creator of G.I. Joe filecards.
- Tanuja Desai Hidier – author of Born Confused
- David Henry Hwang (黃哲倫) – playwright
- Lawson Fusao Inada – poet, winner of the American Book Award and former poet laureate of Oregon
- Gish Jen – writer, novelist
- Ha Jin – novelist, winner of the National Book Award for "Waiting"
- Cynthia Kadohata – author of children's books, recipient of the Newbery Medal (2005) and National Book Award for Young People's Literature (2013)
- Rafael Kayanan – comics artist, TV writer and master level instructor in Sayoc Kali
- Jaegwon Kim – philosopher at Brown University
- Maxine Hong Kingston – writer, novelist, recipient of the 2008 National Book Foundation's Medal for Distinguished Contribution to American Letters
- Jean Kwok – writer, novelist
- Jhumpa Lahiri – Pulitzer Prize-winning author
- Gus Lee (李健孫) – writer
- Jim Lee – DC Comics writer, artist, editor and publisher
- Huping Ling – history professor, award-winning author, Executive Editor for the Journal of Asian American Studies
- Bette Bao Lord (包柏漪) – writer, novelist
- David Wong Louie – writer
- Adeline Yen Mah (馬嚴君玲) – author and physician
- Nick Manabat – creator of Cybernary, comic book artist for Wildstorm Productions
- Gary R. Mar – philosopher at Stony Brook University
- William Marr (馬為義, 非馬) – engineer, poet, translator, and artist
- Janice Mirikitani – former poet laureate for San Francisco
- Kenn Navarro – animator of cartoon Happy Tree Friends
- Aimee Nezhukumatathil – award-winning poet and professor
- Han Ong – playwright and author; recipient of MacArthur Foundation "genius" grant
- Pai Hsien-yung – Chinese Muslim writer
- Linda Sue Park – American-born author; winner of the 2002 Newbery Medal for A Single Shard
- Whilce Portacio – created Bishop of the X-Men, co-founder of Image Comics
- Randy Romero – writer
- Albert Saijo – poet
- Saumitra Saxena – award-winning poet in the modern Indian history; graduated from Indian Institute of Technology and received his PhD from the University of Illinois at Chicago
- Lisa See – writer
- T. K. Seung – philosopher and literary critic at University of Texas, Austin
- Kamila Shamsie – award-winning novelist of books such as Salt and Saffron and Broken Verses
- Eileen Tabios – poet
- Ronald Takaki – academic, historian, ethnographer and author and recipient of the Anisfield-Wolf Book Award in 1994
- Amy Tan – best-selling author of The Joy Luck Club, The Bonesetter's Daughter, The Kitchen God's Wife, etc.
- Romeo Tanghal – comic book artist
- Bryan Thao Worra – award-winning Lao American writer, 1st Lao American NEA Fellow in Literature
- Alex Tizon – Pulitzer Prize winner
- Dr. Abraham Verghese – noted Doctor and Author; In My Own Country and My Tennis Partner
- Jose Garcia Villa – poet, writer, generationalist; pre-Beat Generation influence
- Raees Warsi – notable poet, author and TV anchor
- Michi Weglyn – author and recipient of the Anisfield-Wolf Book Award in 1977
- Jade Snow Wong – writer
- Shawn Wong – novelist, "Americanese" and "Homebase"
- Timothy C. Wong (黃宗泰) – sinologist, translator, and literary theorist
- Hisaye Yamamoto – short story writer, recipient of the American Book Award for Lifetime Achievement in 1986
- Karen Tei Yamashita – author and playwright, recipient of the 2021 National Book Foundation's Medal for Distinguished Contribution to American Letters
- Gene Luen Yang – graphic novelist
- Taro Yashima – author of children's books, recipient of the 1955 Children's Book Award
- Laurence Yep (叶祥添) – author of children's books
- Charles Yu – novelist and winner of the 2020 National Book Award for Fiction
- Connie Young Yu – writer and historian
- Judy Yung – writer

== Military ==
=== Individuals ===
- John Aiso, lieutenant colonel, U.S, Army. Highest ranking Japanese American during WW2 as Director of the MIS. (Also see Law above).
- Leandro Aragoncillo – gunnery sergeant, U.S. Marine Corps. Convicted of spying against the United States Government
- Raquel C. Bono – rear admiral (lower half), U.S. Navy. Command Surgeon, United States Pacific Command
- Jose Calugas – captain, U.S. Army. Medal of Honor recipient, World War II
- Hung Cao - captain, U.S. Navy, 35th United States Under Secretary of the Navy, As of April 26, 2026 acting United States Secretary of the Navy
- Joseph Caravalho – brigadier general, U.S. Army. Commanding General, Brooke Army Medical Center
- Ming Chang – rear admiral (upper half), U.S. Navy, retired. Department of Navy Inspector General, 1987–1990
- Dan Choi – first lieutenant, U.S. Army. Gay rights advocate.
- Florence Choe - lieutenant, U.S. Navy.
- David S. C. Chu – captain, U.S. Army. Under Secretary of Defense for Personnel and Readiness (2001–2008), President/CEO of the Institute for Defense Analyses
- Gordon Pai'ea Chung-Hoon – rear admiral (upper half), U.S. Navy. First Asian American citizen graduate from United States Naval Academy; first Asian American flag officer
- Anatolio B. Cruz – rear admiral (lower half), U.S. Navy. Deputy Commander, United States Fourth Fleet
- Susan Ahn Cuddy – lieutenant, U.S. Navy. First female Gunnery Officer in the navy
- John R. D'Araujo Jr. – major general, U.S. Army. First Filipino American to be promoted to a general officer rank. Former Director of the Army National Guard Bureau. Former Director of the Recovery Division for the Federal Emergency Management Agency (FEMA).
- Rudolph Davila – first lieutenant, U.S. Army. Medal of Honor Recipient, World War II
- Tammy Duckworth, lieutenant colonel, U.S. Army. Helicopter pilot shot down in Iraq, losing both legs. Continued to serve first as Director of Illinois VA, VA Assistant Secretary, and current Senator. (Also see Politics below).
- John Liu Fugh – major general, U.S. Army, retired. First Chinese American officer to be promoted to a general officer rank in the United States Army; first Chinese American to serve as Judge Advocate General of the Army
- Barney F. Hajiro – private, U.S. Army. Medal of Honor recipient in World War II
- Harry B. Harris Jr. – admiral, U.S. Navy. First Asian American to achieve the rank of a four-star admiral. Later Ambassador to South Korea.
- Mikio Hasemoto – private, U.S. Army. Posthumous Medal of Honor recipient in World War II
- Joe Hayashi – private, U.S. Army. Posthumous Medal of Honor recipient in World War II
- Shizuya Hayashi – private, U.S. Army. Medal of Honor recipient in World War II
- Oscar Hilman – brigadier general, U.S. Army, retired.
- Kwang-Ping Hsu – captain, U.S. Coast Guard. First foreign-born graduate from the United States Coast Guard Academy
- Ruth Chan Jang - corporal, U.S. Army
- Daniel Inouye – captain, U.S. Army. Distinguished Service Cross recipient for actions during WWII, later upgraded to Medal of Honor in 2000. Went on to become a U.S. Senator. (Also see Politics below).
- Theodore Kanamine – United States Army brigadier general
- Terry Teruo Kawamura – sergeant first class, U.S. Army. Posthumous Medal of Honor recipient in Vietnam War
- Jonny Kim - lieutenant commander, U.S. Navy. SEAL, flight surgeon, naval aviator, astronaut
- Young-Oak Kim – colonel, U.S. Army. First ethnic minority to lead a U.S. Army Battalion
- Yeiki Kobashigawa – second lieutenant, U.S. Army. Medal of Honor recipient in World War II
- Wah Kau Kong – second lieutenant, U.S. Army Air Corps. First Chinese American fighter pilot
- Alice K. Kurashige – captain, U.S. Marine Corps. First Japanese American woman to be commissioned in the United States Marine Corps
- Robert T. Kuroda – staff sergeant, U.S. Army. Posthumous Medal of Honor recipient in World War II
- Ben Kuroki – technical sergeant, U.S. Army Air Corps. Only Japanese American Army Air Force pilot to fly combat missions in the Pacific theater in World War II
- Mara Huling Langevin - lieutenant commander, U.S. Coast Guard. First Coast Guard Asian American female aviator.
- Hazel Ying Lee (李月英) – civilian, Women Airforce Service Pilot (WASP). First Chinese American woman to earn a pilot's license; flew for the United States Army Air Forces during World War II
- Kurt Lee – major, US Marine Corps. First Asian American marine corps officer, Navy Cross recipient
- Vicente Lim - lieutenant colonel, U.S. Army. later brigadier general, Philippine Army and charter member of the Boy Scouts of the Philippines
- Brian L. Losey – rear admiral (lower half), U.S. Navy. Navy SEAL, and Commander of U.S. Special Operations Command, Africa (SOCAFRICA); Japanese American and first Asian American SEAL flag officer
- Viet Xuan Luong – major general, U.S. Army. First Vietnam-born general officer.
- Ron J. MacLaren - rear admiral, U.S. Navy. First Korean American flag officer
- Eleanor Mariano – rear admiral (lower half), U.S. Navy, retired. First Filipino American to be promoted to a flag officer rank. Former White House physician
- Susan K. Mashiko – major general, U.S. Air Force
- Roy Matsumoto – master sergeant, U.S. Army. Member of Merrill's Marauders, and an inductee of the U.S. Army Rangers Hall Of Fame and the Military Intelligence Corps Hall of Fame
- Spark Matsunaga – captain, U.S. Army. Senator from Hawaii, 1977–1990
- Hiroshi Miyamura – staff sergeant, U.S. Army. Medal of Honor recipient in Korean War
- Kenneth P. Moritsugu – rear admiral (upper half), U.S. Public Health Service. Former acting Surgeon General of the United States
- Kaoru Moto – private first class, U.S. Army. Medal of Honor recipient in World War II
- Sadao Munemori – private first class, U.S. Army. Posthumous Medal of Honor recipient in World War II
- Kiyoshi K. Muranaga – private first class, U.S. Army. Posthumous Medal of Honor recipient in World War II
- Michael K. Nagata – lieutenant general, U.S. Army
- Masato Nakae – private first class, U.S. Army. Medal of Honor recipient in World War II
- Shinyei Nakamine – private, U.S. Army. Posthumous Medal of Honor recipient in World War II
- William K. Nakamura – private first class, U.S. Army. Posthumous Medal of Honor recipient in World War II
- Paul M. Nakasone – U.S. Army four-star general, 3rd commander of the United States Cyber Command and 18th director of the National Security Agency
- Huan Nguyen – rear admiral, U.S. Navy. First Vietnamese American naval flag officer.
- Joe M. Nishimoto – private first class, U.S. Army. Posthumous Medal of Honor recipient in World War II
- José B. Nísperos – private, U.S. Army. First Asian American Medal of Honor recipient
- Allan M. Ohata – captain, U.S. Army. Medal of Honor recipient in World War II
- Fred Ohr – captain, U.S. Army Air Corps. To date, only Korean American fighter ace
- James K. Okubo – technician fifth grade, U.S. Army. Posthumous Medal of Honor recipient in World War II
- Yukio Okutsu – technical sergeant, U.S. Army. Medal of Honor recipient in World War II
- Allen K. Ono – lieutenant general, U.S. Army, retired. First Japanese American lieutenant general; first Asian American lieutenant general
- Frank H. Ono – private first class, U.S. Army. Posthumous Medal of Honor recipient in World War II
- Kazuo Otani – staff sergeant, U.S. Army. Posthumous Medal of Honor recipient in World War II
- Quang X. Pham – major, U.S. Marine Corps; first Vietnamese American naval aviator
- Joseph Pierce – corporal, 14th Connecticut Infantry Regiment. Served during the American Civil War
- Coral Wong Pietsch – brigadier general, U.S. Army Reserve, retired. First female Asian American general officer in the US Army.
- Eldon Regua – major general, U.S. Army Reserve. Commanding General, 75th Division (BCTD). Only non-retired Filipino American general officer.
- George T. Sakato – private, U.S. Army. Medal of Honor recipient in World War II
- George Shibata, first lieutenant, U.S. Air Force. First Japanese American graduate of a United States Military Academy
- Eric Shinseki – general, U.S. Army, retired. Chief of Staff of the United States Army, 1999–2003; Secretary of Veterans Affairs, 2009–present (As of October 2009). Highest-ranked Asian American, As of October 2009, to have served in the United States military
- Elmelindo Rodrigues Smith – sergeant first class, U.S. Army. Posthumous Medal of Honor recipient in Vietnam War
- Edward Soriano – lieutenant general, U.S. Army, retired. Former Commanding General of I Corps. Highest ranked Filipino American, As of October 2009, to have served in the United States military
- Ramon S. Subejano – private first class, U.S. Army. Silver Star recipient in World War II
- Benigno G. Tabora – sergeant major, U.S. Army. Purple Heart recipient, World War II
- Antonio Taguba – major general, U.S. Army, retired. Author of the Taguba Report
- Ted T. Tanouye – technical sergeant, U.S. Army. Posthumous Medal of Honor recipient in World War II
- Sue Mi Terry – CIA intelligence analyst specializing in East Asia
- Bhagat Singh Thind – private, U.S. Army. Enlisted in Army during World War I, was an acting Sergeant during training, honorably discharged at the end of the war.
- Telesforo Trinidad – fireman second class, U.S. Navy. Only Asian American naval recipient of the Medal of Honor
- Eleanor Valentin – rear admiral (lower half), Medical Corps, U.S. Navy. Commander, Naval Medical Support Command
- Suzanne Vares-Lum, major general, U.S. Army. First Native Hawaiian female General
- Francis B. Wai – captain, U.S. Army. Only Chinese American to have been awarded the Medal of Honor
- Ehren Watada – first lieutenant, U.S. Army. First officer Operation Iraqi Freedom objector
- Mun Charn Wong – lieutenant colonel, U.S. Air Force. Pilot, World War II
- Ted Wong – major general, U.S. Army. 26th chief of the U.S. Army Dental Corps
- Bruce Yamashita – captain, U.S. Marine Corps Reserves, retired. Worked to expose racial discrimination
- Xiong Yan – captain, U.S. Army. Chaplain, former Chinese dissident
- Rodney James Takashi Yano – sergeant first class, U.S. Army. Posthumous Medal of Honor recipient in Vietnam War
- James Yee – captain, U.S. Army. Muslim Chaplain previously charged with Sedition
- Daniel Yoo - major general, U.S. Marine Corps. First Korean American general officer
- John C. Young – colonel, U.S. Army, combat liaison officer, CBI, WWII

==== Foreign military service ====
- Arthur Chin (陳瑞鈿) – major, National Revolutionary Army. World War II pilot and fighter ace with Canton Provincial Air Force
- Ma Dunjing – major general, National Revolutionary Army. Chinese Muslim immigrated to Los Angeles in the United States after retirement in 1950
- Ma Hongkui – lieutenant general, National Revolutionary Army. Chinese Muslim immigrated to Los Angeles in the United States after retirement in 1950
- Nobuaki Iwatake – conscript, Imperial Japanese Army
- Nguyễn Ngọc Loan – brigadier general, Army of the Republic of Vietnam. Subject of Eddie Adam's photograph
- Vang Pao – major general, Royal Lao Army. Hmong Leader, commander of CIA-supported Hmong forces during the Laotian Civil War
- Ngo Quang Truong – lieutenant general, Army of the Republic of Vietnam, author

== News/media/journalism ==
- Guy Aoki – founder of Media Action Network for Asian Americans
- Ben Calhoun – radio journalist at This American Life
- Cher Calvin – news anchor
- Emily Chang – journalist, news anchor, author
- Jeff Chang – journalist, hip-hop historian
- Laura Chang – science editor, The New York Times
- Christine Chen – Emmy Award-winning journalist and news anchor
- Julie Chen Moonves – newsreader on The Early Show and host of Big Brother
- Lanhee Chen – American policy expert, academic and CNN political commentator
- Anna Chen Chennault (陳香梅) – journalist, notable in American public life; also, wife of Claire Chennault of the Flying Tigers
- Kiran Chetry – television news anchor
- Connie Chung – anchor and journalist, 2 Emmy Awards for Best Interviewer
- Ann Curry – anchor and correspondent for NBC News and Today
- Veronica De La Cruz – CNN News anchor
- Cynthia Gouw – award-winning television and radio reporter/anchor
- Sanjay Gupta – CNN senior medical correspondent
- Joseph Heco (1837–1897) – fisherman, writer, first to publish a Japanese language newspaper
- Ching He Huang – cooking show host
- Philip Jaisohn – journalist, activist, the first Korean to become a naturalized citizen of the United States
- Pedram Javaheri – meteorologist for CNN International & HLN
- Michiko Kakutani – Pulitzer Prize winning New York Times literary critic and author
- K. Connie Kang – first female Korean American journalist, wrote for Los Angeles Times
- Ken Kashiwahara – first Asian American network news anchor, Emmy-winning television journalist
- Guy Kawasaki – author, Apple evangelist
- Mina Kimes – journalist, ESPN commentator
- Gobind Behari Lal – science journalist and the first Asian American Pulitzer prize winner
- Euna Lee – journalist
- Jennifer 8. Lee – journalist, The New York Times
- K. W. Lee – journalist, founder of the Korean American Journalists Association
- Young Jean Lee – playwright, director, and filmmaker
- Carol Lin – news anchor
- Sam Chu Lin – journalist, one of the first Asian Americans on network TV news
- Lisa Ling (凌志慧) – journalist, known for her role as a co-host of ABC's The View and host of National Geographic Ultimate Explorer documentarian for CNN
- Betty Liu – news anchor
- Richard Lui – news anchor of MSNBC
- Michelle Malkin – Fox News reporter and author
- Vinita Nair – current anchor of World News Now and America This Morning on ABC.
- Kent Ninomiya – anchor, reporter, news executive
- Uma Pemmaraju – Fox News Channel senior news anchor
- Dith Pran – photojournalist. The Killing Fields was based on his life.
- Aneesh Raman – CNN Middle East correspondent
- Scott Sassa – former President of NBC West Coast
- Sharon Tay – journalist
- Iva Toguri (1916–2006) – radio broadcaster who has been nicknamed "Tokyo Rose"
- Kaity Tong – television news anchor, WPIX-TV
- Ben Fong-Torres (方振豪) – journalist, Rolling Stone
- Stephanie Trong – journalist, former Executive Editor, Jane Magazine; current Executive Editor Nylon Magazine
- Ali Velshi – CNN business anchor
- Zain Verjee – CNN anchor
- Doualy Xaykaothao - award-winning Hmong American radio journalist
- Michael Yamashita – president/CEO and publisher of Bay Area Reporter
- Jeff Yang – writer, media/business consultant, Asian American culture columnist for the San Francisco Chronicle
- John Yang – Peabody Award-winning news correspondent and commentator for NBC Nightly News, Today, and MSNBC
- Al Young — journalist, 1st Asian American Mainland U.S. newspaper sportswriter, editor, columnist.
- Fareed Zakaria – editor of Newsweek, host of Fareed Zakaria GPS on CNN

== Politics ==
- Peter Aduja, first lieutenant, U.S. Army. First Filipino American elected in the United States.
- Daniel Akaka, elected to the U.S. Senate from Hawaii in 1990.
- George Ariyoshi, became the first Asian American governor in the United States when he was elected Governor of Hawaii in 1974.
- Arunan Arulampalam, mayor of Hartford, Connecticut
- Larry Asera, first Filipino American elected in the continental United States
- Kumar Barve, became the first Indian-American in U.S. history elected to a state legislative body in 1990.
- Rob Bonta, California Attorney General
- Thelma Buchholdt, became the first Filipina American legislator and the first Filipino American legislator elected to office outside of Hawaii in 1974. She was elected by a constituency which was less than 1% Asian American, and served four terms in the Alaska state legislature.
- Anh "Joseph" Cao, became the first Vietnamese American Congressman as a Representative for Louisiana in 2008.
- Ben Cayetano, elected Governor of Hawaii in 1994.
- Elaine Chao, became the first Asian American woman and the first Chinese American in the U.S. Cabinet when George W. Bush, appointed her Secretary of Labor in 2001.
- David S. Chang, first Korean-American to chair a major state political party
- Stephanie Chang, first Asian American woman to serve in the Michigan Legislature; current State senator representing Michigan's 1st District.
- appointed the White House Staff Secretary by President Ronald Reagan in 1985. It is the highest position in the Executive Office of the President held by an Asian American.
- John Chiang, 33rd California State Treasurer, 31st California State Controller and former California Board of Equalization
- Upendra J. Chivukula, became the first Asian American elected to the New Jersey General Assembly in 2002.
- Judy Chu, first Chinese American woman elected to the U.S. Congress. U.S. House of Representatives from California's 27th district
- Steven Chu, 12th United States Secretary of Energy from 2009 to 2013
- Sada Cumber, first United States Ambassador to the OIC
- Charles Djou, major, U.S. Army. Former Congressman from Hawaii.
- Tammy Duckworth, Assistant Secretary for the Department of Veterans Affairs and first Asian American woman elected to Congress in Illinois. (Also see Military above).
- Mervyn Dymally, representative from California
- Hiram Fong became the first Asian American elected to the U.S. Senate in 1959.
- Allan Fung, of Chinese descent, First Asian-American elected as Mayor in Rhode Island, prominent lawyer.
- Tulsi Gabbard, Congresswoman from Hawaii and DNI
- Nikki Haley, of Indian descent, was the governor of South Carolina and first Asian American woman governor.
- Colleen Hanabusa, Congresswoman from Hawaii
- Bruce Harrell, Mayor of Seattle
- Harry B. Harris Jr, ambassador and diplomat
- Kamala Harris, 49th Vice President of the United States and the first Asian/female/African American Vice President and Attorney General of California
- Foung Hawj, pioneer Hmong broadcaster, was elected to Minnesota State Senate in 2012 with support from the Sierra Club and a broad multicultural network.
- Mazie Hirono, former lieutenant governor of State of Hawaii, currently junior United States senator from Hawaii
- Mike Honda, U.S. Congressman from California's 15th congressional district, became the highest-ranking Asian American member of the Democratic National Committee, as the party's vice-chair in 2005.
- David Ige, governor of Hawaii from 2014 to 2022
- Daniel Inouye, first Japanese American elected to the House of Representatives in 1959. U.S. Senate (1962), and was the President pro tempore of the Senate from 2010-2012. (Also see Military above).
- Adena Ishii, mayor of Berkeley, California and the first Asian American and woman of color to be elected to the position
- Bobby Jindal, Indian American, former governor of Louisiana.
- Justin Jones, Tennessee state representative
- Scott Kawasaki, Alaska State Senator
- Jane Kim, Korean American politician and first Korean American elected official in San Francisco
- Sung Kim, ambassador & diplomat
- Young Kim, member of the United States House of Representatives (R-CA)
- Padma Kuppa, first Indian immigrant and Hindu in the Michigan Legislature; current member of Michigan's House of Representatives, representing Michigan's 41st district.
- Tony Lam, became the first Vietnamese American elected to office when he was elected to the Westminster, California, city council in 1992.
- Susan C. Lee, first Asian American elected to Maryland State Senate and to serve as Maryland Secretary of State.
- Ted Lieu, member of the United States House of Representatives (D-CA)
- Gary Locke, elected the first Asian American governor in the mainland United States in November 1996 and became Governor of Washington in January 1997.
- John Liu, became the first Asian American elected to the New York City Council (representing Flushing, Queens) in 2001.
- Zohran Mamdani, Member of the New York State Assembly, Mayor of New York City
- Kinjiro Matsudaira, mayor of Edmonston, Maryland, in 1927 and 1943
- Bob Matsui, Representative from California
- Doris Matsui, Congresswoman from California
- Jimmy Meng, became the first Asian American elected to the New York State Legislature in 2004.
- Aruna Miller, first South Asian woman elected lieutenant governor in the United States in 2023 and the first Indian American woman elected to the Maryland House of Delegates in 2010.
- Norman Mineta, mayor of San Jose, CA, became the first Asian American in the U.S. Cabinet as Secretary of Commerce in 2000, and later Secretary of Transportation.
- Patsy Takemoto Mink became the first Asian American woman to serve in Congress, as a representative of Hawaii in 1964; she ended up serving 12 terms.
- Mee Moua, became the first Hmong American elected to any state legislature. A Democrat representing St. Paul's East Side, she is the highest ranking Hmong American elected official in the United States in 2002.
- Buu Nygren, President of the Navajo Nation; Vietnamese on his father's side
- Gina Ortiz Jones, Mayor of San Antonio
- Aftab Pureval, Mayor of Cincinnati
- Sean Reyes, current U.S. attorney general of Utah
- Eunice Sato, became the first Asian-American female mayor of a major American city (Long Beach, California) in 1980
- Dalip Singh Saund, became the first Asian immigrant elected to the U.S. Congress upon his election to the House of Representatives in 1956.
- Sichan Siv, former U.S. Ambassador to the United Nations Economic and Social Council and the author of Golden Bones.
- Michelle Steel, member of the United States House of Representatives (R-CA)
- Marilyn Strickland, member of the United States House of Representatives (D-WA)
- Saghir Tahir, served as a New Hampshire State Representative. Only elected Muslim in the Republican Party.
- Mark Takano, U.S. congressman from California
- Mark Takai, U.S. congressman from Hawaii
- Sheng Thao, mayor of Oakland, California, first Hmong-American mayor of a major U.S. city
- Jill Tokuda, U.S. Representative from Hawaii
- William Tong, Connecticut Attorney General.
- Van Tran, elected a Republican member of the California State Assembly and is the first Vietnamese American to serve in any state legislature in 2004.
- Usha Vance, first Indian and Telugu American to be the Second Lady of the United States.
- Hubert Vo, Vietnamese immigrant, became the first Vietnamese American elected to the Texas Legislature in 2004.
- Shien Biau Woo became the first Asian American statewide officer in the Northeast, when he was elected Lieutenant Governor of Delaware in 1984.
- Leana Wen, prominent Asian American and public health leader, currently Commissioner of Health in Baltimore.
- David Wu, first Taiwanese American U.S. Representative (D-OR)
- Lily Wu, mayor of Wichita, Kansas
- Michelle Wu first female Asian American Boston City Councilor, first Boston City Councilor of Chinese descent, and first Asian American to be Mayor of Boston.
- Andrew Yang first Asian-American man to run for President of the United States as a Democrat for (2020 United States presidential election)
- Kimberly Yee, became Arizona's first Asian American woman to serve as a member of the Arizona State Legislature.
- Yee Leng Xiong, elected as treasurer of Wisconsin, and became first Hmong American to be elected to statewide office.

== Religion ==
- Angela Warnick Buchdahl (born 1972), rabbi
- Randolph Roque Calvo, 7th Bishop of Reno, mixed Chamorro, Filipino, and Spanish.
- Francis Chan, American preacher. He is the former teaching pastor of Cornerstone Community Church in Simi Valley, California, a Christian church he and his wife started in 1994.
- Bruce Reyes-Chow, first American-born Asian American to be elected moderator of the 2.2-million-member Presbyterian Church (USA) in 2008.
- Bhante Dharmawara, Buddhist monk and teacher who helped resettle thousands of Cambodian refugees in the US and founded the first Cambodian Buddhist temple in USA.
- Gerrit W. Gong, Apostle, Quorum of the 12 Apostles, The Church of Jesus Christ of Latter-day Saints.
- Ruben Habito, Filipino Zen Master of the Sanbō Kyōdan lineage and founder of Maria Kannon Zen Center in Dallas, Texas.
- Jian Tan, Buddhist monk and current abbot of the Chung Tai Zen Center of Houston.
- Hae Jong Kim, elected Bishop of United Methodist Church in 1992.
- Seyoon Kim, biblical scholar at Fuller Theological Seminary.
- Jakusho Kwong, American Chinese Zen Master of Shunryu Suzuki lineage, founder and head abbot of Sonoma Mountain Zen Center.
- Sang Hyun Lee, theologian at Princeton Theological Seminary.
- Dominic Mai Thanh Lương, auxiliary bishop of the Roman Catholic Diocese of Orange.
- Sōyū Matsuoka, Zen teacher and founder of several temples.
- Chieko Okazaki, Relief Society General Presidency, Church of Jesus Christ of Latter-day Saints. First person of color to serve on general boards of the church. Served on the Young Women, Primary, and Relief Society General Boards in Salt Lake City, Utah. (From Hawaiʻi).
- Andrew S. Park, teaches at United Theological Seminary in Trotwood, Ohio.
- Peter C. Phan, American Catholic theologian who is a native of Vietnam.
- Shi Yan Ming, 34th generation Shaolin monk and founder of the USA Shaolin Temple.
- Oscar A. Solis, first Filipino American Roman Catholic bishop in the United States.
- C. S. Song, Distinguished Professor Emeritus of Theology and Asian Cultures at the Pacific School of Religion and acting minister at the Formosan United Methodist Church in San Leandro, California.
- Su Bong, Korean American Zen Master from Kwan Um School of Zen and the designated heir of Seung Sahn's lineage.
- Kenneth K. Tanaka, scholar, author, translator and ordained Jōdo Shinshū priest.
- Thích Thiên-Ân, Buddhist monk, meditation teacher and founder of International Buddhist Meditation Center in Los Angeles, California.
- Ignatius C. Wang, first Chinese American to become a bishop in the Catholic Church.
- Amos Yong, professor of systematic theology at Regent University.
- Jimmy Yu (Guo Gu or 果谷), Chan teacher of Sheng Yen lineage, associate professor of religion at Florida State University and founder of Tallahassee Chan Center in Tallahassee, Florida.

== Space ==
This section is a list of astronauts of Asian ancestry who are, by birth or naturalization, American citizens. Sorted by first space flight, then by NASA Astronaut Group (if applicable).

| No. | Image | Name Birth date | Ancestry | Birth | Comment | Missions (Launch date) |
|---|---|---|---|---|---|---|
| 1 | | Ellison Onizuka; June 24, 1946 | Japan | United States | Selected in 1978 to NASA Astronaut Group 8. First Asian American and first Japanese American in space. Died on the Challenger. | STS-51-C (January 24, 1985); STS-51-L (January 28, 1986) |
| 2 | | Taylor Gun-Jin Wang; June 16, 1940 | (Taiwan) Republic of China | | First person of Chinese ancestry and first Chinese American in space. | STS-51-B (April 29, 1985) |
| 3 | | Franklin Chang-Diaz; April 5, 1950 | Qing dynasty Costa Rica | Costa Rica | Selected in 1980 to NASA Astronaut Group 9. Joint record holder, since 2002 (with Jerry L. Ross, set two months earlier that year), for most spaceflights by a human. | STS-61-C (January 12, 1986); STS-34 (October 18, 1989); STS-46 (July 31, 1992); STS-60 (February 3, 1994); STS-75 (February 22, 1996); STS-91 (June 2, 1998); STS-111 (June 5, 2002) |
| 4 | | Eugene Trinh; September 14, 1950 | South Vietnam | | First Vietnamese American in space. | STS-50 (June 25, 1992) |
| 5 | | Leroy Chiao; August 28, 1960 | (Taiwan) Republic of China | United States | Selected in 1990 to NASA Astronaut Group 13. Served on ISS Expedition 10. | STS-65 (July 8, 1994); STS-72 (January 11, 1996); STS-92 (October 11, 2000); Soyuz TMA-5 (October 14, 2004) |
| 6 | | Ed Lu; July 1, 1963 | (Taiwan) Republic of China | United States | Selected in 1994 to NASA Astronaut Group 15. Served on ISS Expedition 7. | STS-84 (May 15, 1997); STS-106 (September 8, 2000); Soyuz TMA-2 (April 6, 2003) |
| 7 | | Kalpana Chawla; March 17, 1962 | India | | Selected in 1994 to NASA Astronaut Group 15. First Indian American in space. Died on the Columbia. | STS-87 (November 19, 1997); STS-107 (January 16, 2003) |
| 8 | | Mark L. Polansky; June 2, 1956 | Republic of Korea | United States | Selected in 1996 to NASA Astronaut Group 16. First Korean American in space. | STS-98 (February 7, 2001); STS-116 (December 9, 2006); STS-127 (July 15, 2009) |
| 9 | | Daniel M. Tani; February 1, 1961 | Japan | United States | Selected in 1996 to NASA Astronaut Group 16. Served on ISS Expedition 16. | STS-108 (December 5, 2001); STS-120 (October 23, 2007); STS-122 (February 7, 2008) |
| 10 | | Sunita Williams; September 19, 1965 | India | United States | Selected in 1998 to NASA Astronaut Group 17. Served on ISS Expedition 14/15, Expedition 32/33 and Expedition 71/72. Second female commander of ISS. First female astronaut to fly on an orbital spacecraft's maiden flight, i.e., Boeing Starliner. | STS-116/117 (December 9, 2006); Soyuz TMA-05M (July 15, 2012); Starliner Crewed Flight Test/SpaceX Crew-9 (June 5, 2024) |
| 11 | | Kjell N. Lindgren; January 23, 1973 | Taiwan; United States | Taiwan | Selected in 2009 to NASA Astronaut Group 20. Served on ISS Expedition 44. | Soyuz TMA-17M (July 22, 2015); SpaceX Crew-4 (April 27, 2022) |
| 12 | | Sirisha Bandla; 1988 | India | | Indian American sub-orbital, sub-Kármán line, space tourist. | Virgin Galactic Unity 22 (July 11, 2021) |
| 13 | | Raja Chari; June 24, 1977 | India | United States | Selected in 2017 to NASA Astronaut Group 22. | SpaceX Crew-3 (November 11, 2021) |
| 14 | | Andy Sadhwani; 1988 | India | United States | Principal Propulsion Engineer at SpaceX | (United States) Galactic 07 (June 8, 2024) |
| 15 | | Ephraim Rabin ? | Israel | United States | Businessman | (United States) Blue Origin NS-26 (August 29, 2024) |
| 16 | | Eiman Jahangir; August 5, 1980 | Iran | United States | Associate professor | (United States) Blue Origin NS-26 (August 29, 2024) |
| 3 | | Tushar Shah | India | United States | a MIT graduate and Particle Physicist | (United States) Blue Origin NS-30 (February 25, 2025) |
| 17 | | Jonny Kim; February 5, 1984 | Republic of Korea | United States | Selected in 2017 to NASA Astronaut Group 22. | (Russia) Soyuz MS-27 (April 8, 2025) |
| 71 | | Amanda Nguyễn; October 10, 1991 | South Vietnam | United States | First Vietnamese American and southeast Asian American woman astronaut. | Blue Origin NS-31 (April 14, 2025) |

== Sports ==
- Benny Agbayani – former outfielder for New York Mets, Colorado Rockies, Kansas City Royals, and Chiba Lotte Marines
- Nathan Adrian – swimmer, multiple Olympic medalist
- Bobby Balcena – first Asian American player in MLB
- David Bautista – WWE performer going by the name "Batista"
- Mohini Bhardwaj – American gymnast and 2004 Olympic silver medalist in the gymnastics team competition
- Raj Bhavsar – 2008 Olympic bronze medalist in the gymnastics team competition
- Tedy Bruschi – American football linebacker for the New England Patriots
- Corbin Carroll – outfielder for Arizona Diamondbacks
- Johnny Chan – professional poker player
- Michael Chang – won tennis' French Open in 1989
- Kaitlyn Chen – professional basketball player
- Nathan Chen – American figure skater and Olympic gold medalist
- Brandon Chillar – American football linebacker for the Green Bay Packers
- Tiffany Chin – won the US Figure Skating Championship in 1985
- Simon Cho – short track speed skater, Olympic medalist
- Amy Chow – won gold and silver medals in gymnastics during the 1996 Olympics
- Norm Chow – former head coach of the Hawaii football team and former offensive coordinator for the Tennessee Titans after helping lead USC to several NCAA championships as the offensive coordinator there. Currently the offensive coordinator for the Los Angeles Wildcats of the XFL.
- Julie Chu – Olympics hockey player
- Clarissa Chun – 2 time Olympic Women's freestyle 48 kg (105.5 lbs) wrestler
- Patrick Chung – 2-time Super Bowl champion, NFL player of Chinese Jamaican heritage with New England Patriots
- Jordan Clarkson – Filipino American NBA player
- Bryan Clay – won the decathlon gold medal in the 2008 Olympics, the silver medal in the 2004 Olympics, and was the sport's 2005 world champion
- Alex Compton – basketball coach
- Tim Cone – basketball coach
- Emily Cross – fencer, Olympic medalist
- Natalie Coughlin – Olympic gold medalist in swimming
- Johnny Damon – 2 time All-Star MLB outfielder currently a free agent
- Sean Davis – soccer player
- Toby Dawson – won a 2006 Olympic bronze medal in Men's Freestyle skiing
- Bill Demong – Nordic combined skier, Olympic medalist
- Kris Dim – IFBB professional bodybuilder
- Victoria Draves – first Asian American to earn a gold medal in the Olympics, winning both the 1948 platform and springboard events
- Mathew Dumba – Canadian ice hockey defenseman for the Minnesota Wild.
- Tommy Edman – Major League Baseball player
- Mark Foo – professional surfer
- Rickie Fowler – golfer
- Catherine Fox – swimmer, double Olympic champion
- Sunny Garcia – Hawaiian-American Professional Surfer and 2000 ASP World Champion.
- Miki Gorman (1935–2015) – two-time winner of both the Boston and New York City marathons; former American and unofficial world record holder in the marathon
- Alexi Grewal – Gold medalist in 1984 Summer Olympics in cycling
- Eileen Gu – Olympic skier who competes for China
- Satoshi Hirayama – baseball player
- Derek Ho – professional surfer
- Maria Ho – professional poker player
- Steven Ho – martial artist
- Ken Hoang – professional gamer
- Ivana Hong – American gymnast
- Ariel Hsing – youngest American U.S. table tennis national champion in history
- Jerry Hsu – Taiwanese-American Professional Skateboarder
- Kanoa Igarashi – Professional Surfer and Olympic Silver Medalist. First surfer of Asian descent to qualify for the World Surf League.
- Rena Inoue – first place in the 2004 and 2006 U.S. Figure Skating Championships (pairs)
- Travis Ishikawa – free agent first baseman
- Haley Ishimatsu – American platform diver and member of the 2008 U.S. Olympic team
- Natasha Kai – American soccer player and part of the gold medal-winning team in the 2008 Beijing Olympics
- Danielle Kang – professional golfer
- Masako Katsura – professional carom billiards player
- Evelyn Kawamoto – won two Olympic bronze medals in swimming in 1952.
- Lee Kiefer – won two Olympic gold medals in women's foil fencing (also first American to win gold), mother is Filipina.
- Anthony Kim – American professional golfer and part of the winning USA team in the 2008 Ryder Cup
- Chloe Kim – American snowboarder and Olympic gold medalist
- Kei Kobayashi – Japanese American Professional Surfer
- Ford Konno – former world record holder, two-time Olympic gold medalist, two-time Olympic silver medalist in swimming (1952 and 1956)
- Tommy Kono (1930–2016) – former world record holder, two-time Olympic gold medalist and Olympic silver medalist in weightlifting (1952, 1956, and 1960)
- Younghoe Koo – NFL kicker
- Eric Koston – Thai-American Professional Skateboarder
- Michelle Kwan – won nine national championships and five world titles, as well as two Olympic medals (silver in 1998, bronze in 2002) in figure skating
- Iris Kyle – professional bodybuilder
- Kyle Larson – American professional stock car racing driver
- Cung Le – UFC mma fighter / former Strikeforce middleweight champion
- Jeanette Lee – pool player
- Sammy Lee (1920–2016) – became the first Asian American man to earn an Olympic gold medal, when he won in platform diving in both 1948 and 1952
- Sunisa Lee – won the 2020 Olympics all-around gymnastics gold medal
- Xaivian Lee – basketball player
- Jeremy Lin – Taiwanese American point guard for the Beijing Ducks and 2019 NBA champion.
- Tim Lincecum – 2 time Cy Young Award-winning pitcher for the San Francisco Giants
- Alysa Liu – figure skater and winner of the 2025 world title
- Mike Lum – Major League Baseball player
- Mike Magpayo – current men's basketball head coach at UC Riverside; first Asian American to serve in this role at an NCAA Division I school
- Alexander Massialas – fencer, Olympic medalist
- Kalei Mau – volleyball player
- Wataru Misaka – broke the NBA color barrier in the 1947–48 season, when he played for the New York Knicks
- Yul Moldauer – artistic gymnast
- Collin Morikawa – golfer who won the 2020 PGA Championship and 2021 Open Championship
- Mirai Nagasu – women's singles figure skating champion in 2008 and an Olympic bronze medalist
- Haruki Nakamura – Free Safety of the Carolina Panthers
- Natalie Nakase – professional basketball coach
- Hikaru Nakamura – became the youngest American ever to earn the titles of National Master (age 10) and International Grandmaster (age 15) in chess
- Paeng Nepomuceno – won in almost every major international bowling championships
- Kim Ng – Athletes Unlimited Softball League commissioner and former general manager of the Miami Marlins; first woman to serve in that role in any of the "Big Four" professional leagues of North America
- Dat Nguyen – All-American linebacker at Texas A&M University and later became the first Vietnamese American in the National Football League
- Apolo Anton Ohno – won eight Olympic medals in short-track speed skating (two gold) in 2002, 2006, and 2010 as well as a world cup championship
- Naomi Osaka – Japanese-American tennis champion
- Yoshinobu Oyakawa – former world record holder and 1952 Olympic gold medalist in the 100-meter backstroke
- Jessica Pegula – tennis player
- Tommy Pham – Major League Baseball player
- Rajeev Ram – tennis player, Olympic medalist
- Dave Roberts – former Major League Baseball player, 2004 World Series champion, and current manager of the Los Angeles Dodgers.
- Jason Robertson – left winger for the Dallas Stars in the National Hockey League
- Kyla Ross – 2012 Olympic gold medalist gymnast, numerous World Championships medalist, and NCAA champion
- Addison Russell – Filipino-American Baseball Player, and 2016 World Series Champion
- Harold Sakata – won a weightlifting silver medal in the 1948 Olympics
- Eric Sato – won a 1988 Olympic gold medal in volleyball
- Liane Sato – won a 1992 Olympic bronze medal in volleyball
- Xander Schauffele - PGA Tour Golfer, Olympic Gold Medalist
- Alex Shibutani – figure skater, Olympic medalist
- Maia Shibutani – figure skater, Olympic medalist
- Dave Shoji – former head coach of the Hawaii Rainbow Wahine volleyball team and the winningest head coach in NCAA Division I Women's Volleyball History.
- Erik Shoji – volleyball player, Olympic medalist
- Kawika Shoji – volleyball player, Olympic medalist
- Vijay Singh – professional golfer
- Wesley So – chess grandmaster
- Daewon Song – Professional Skateboarder
- Erik Spoelstra – head coach of the Miami Heat; Filipino mother
- Kurt Suzuki – Major League Baseball player
- Kevin Tan – American gymnast and part of the bronze medal-winning team in the 2008 Beijing Olympics
- Sonya Thomas – one of the world's top competitive eaters
- Brandon Vera – UFC fighter
- Shane Victorino – former Major League Baseball player, and 2x World Series Champion (2008, 2013).
- Anthony Volpe – shortstop for the New York Yankees
- Ed Wang – became the first fully Chinese-American selected in the NFL Draft when drafted by the Buffalo Bills
- Hines Ward – was the MVP of Super Bowl XL while playing for the Pittsburgh Steelers
- Michelle Waterson-Gomez – MMA fighter
- Michelle Wie – golfer
- Kolten Wong – Major League Baseball player
- Tiger Woods – golfer of Chinese, Thai, Caucasian, African American, and Native American descent; self described as "Cablinasian" (a syllabic abbreviation he coined from Caucasian, Black, American Indian, and Asian)
- Kristi Yamaguchi – won three national figure skating championships, two world titles, and the 1992 Olympic gold medal
- Tabitha Yim – American gymnast
- Wally Yonamine – multisport athlete, played for the San Francisco 49ers (1947), Yomiuri Giants (1951–1960), Chunichi Dragons (1961–1962), and manager of the Chunichi Dragons (1972–1977). Only American to be admitted into the Japanese Baseball Hall of Fame.
- Al Young – world champion race car driver
- Jennifer Yu – U.S. women's chess champion in 2019 and 2022
- Caroline Zhang – American figure skater and 2007 Junior World Champion

== Criminals ==
- Steve Banerjee – convicted arsonist, racketeer, and murderer, and co-founder of Chippendales
- Robert John Bardo – mass murderer who killed actress Rebecca Schaeffer
- Seung-Hui Cho – mass murderer and perpetrator of the Virginia Tech shooting
- Andrew Cunanan – spree killer who killed fashion designer Gianni Versace
- Chol Soo Lee – man falsely accused of killing Chinatown gang leader
- Wayne Lo – mass murderer
- Charles Ng – serial killer
- Bei Bei Shuai – woman charged with attempted murder after her suicide attempt resulted in the death of her fetus
- Chai Vang – mass murderer

== Other ==
- Frank Chu – professional protester
- Melissa Doi – September 11 victim
- Edsel Ford Fong – waiter known for his rudeness
- Andrew Kim – former head of CIA's Korea Mission Center
- Hiu Lui Ng – Chinese immigrant who died in U.S. Immigration and Customs Enforcement custody
- Betty Ong – flight attendant killed in the September 11 attacks
- Zhe Zeng – banker killed in the September 11 attacks
- Eddy Zheng – youth counselor

== See also ==
- List of Bangladeshi Americans
- List of Burmese Americans
- List of Cambodian Americans
- List of Chinese Americans
- List of Filipino Americans
- List of Hmong Americans
- List of Indian Americans
- List of Indonesian Americans
- List of Japanese Americans
- List of Korean Americans
- List of Laotian Americans
- List of Pakistani Americans
- List of Sri Lankan Americans
- List of Taiwanese Americans
- List of Vietnamese Americans
