= Manabat =

Manabat is a surname. Notable people with the surname include:

- Dindin Santiago-Manabat (born 1993), Filipino volleyball player
- Nick Manabat (1972–1995), Filipino comics artist
- Xyriel Manabat (born 2004), Filipina actress
