= Ritu =

Ritu may refer to:

== Arts and entertainment ==
- Ritu, a 2013 album by Saille
- Ritu (2009 film), a Malayalam film directed by Shyamaprasad
- Ritu (2014 film), a Nepali film directed by Manoj Adhikari
- Ritu Samhaaram, or Ṛtusaṃhāra, a Sanskrit epic describing the Indian seasons

== Other uses ==
- Ritu (Indian season), the word for 'seasons' in various calendars of South Asia
- Ṛtú or ritu, a fixed or appointed time in Vedic
- Rutog County (Ritu County), a county in Tibet

== People ==
- Ritu Arya, British Indian actress
- Ritu Barmecha, Indian film actress
- Ritu Beri, an Indian fashion designer
- Ritu Chaudhry, birth name of actress Mahima Chaudhry
- Ritu Kumar, Indian fashion designer
- Ritu Pathak, Bollywood playback singer
- Ritu Porna Chakma, Bangladeshi football player
- Ritu Raj, American entrepreneur
- Ritu Rani, Indian field hockey player
- Ritu Rani (footballer), Indian football player
- Ritu Shivpuri, Indian film actress and model
- Ritu Varma, Indian film actress
- Ritu Tawde, Indian politician
