= Mangchi =

Mangchi is a Korean word (망치, Mangchi) that means hammer. It may refer to:

- A character in Hammerboy, a Korean animated film
- Maangchi, a Korean-American YouTuber and cookbook author
