= Cindy Hsu =

American journalist

- Born: Cindy Kwang-Mei Hsu; Honolulu, Hawaii
- Education: Virginia Tech
- Known for: WCBS-TV (1993-present)
- Children: 1

Cindy Kwang-Mei Hsu is a Chinese American Emmy Award winning news reporter and anchor at WCBS-TV in New York City. She currently anchors CBS 2 News at Noon and substitute anchors for other shows. She previously anchored for the morning, 9 a.m. and 5:00 p.m. newscasts. She also anchored the weekend morning and evening newscasts until 2016.

== Early career ==
Hsu joined the station in 1993 as a reporter and was later promoted to anchor various shows including Mornings, CBS News New York at 9 a.m., the Noon show, the News at 5 p.m. and weekends. She now anchors CBS News New York at Noon, reports on mental health issues and creates daily segments called Start with Kindness.

Prior to joining WCBS-TV, Hsu worked as a reporter and anchor at WFRV-TV in Green Bay, Wisconsin and for WTOV-TV in Steubenville, Ohio. She began her broadcasting career as an associate producer for WTVR-TV in Richmond, Virginia.

Hsu was awarded an honorary doctorate from St. Thomas Aquinas College and a degree in communication studies from Virginia Tech.

== Personal life ==
Hsu was born in Honolulu Hawaii to Captain Kwang Ping Hsu a Coast Guard pilot and Rosemary Hsu a systems engineer. Both her parents immigrated to the US from China as children. Hsu is a mental health advocate after going public in 2021 about her severe depression, suicide attempt and hospitalization that happened in 2015. Since opening-up in a half-hour special Breaking the Stigma, she spends a lot of time spreading awareness and hope when it comes to mental illness. Hsu is on the National Board of The American Foundation for Suicide Prevention. In 2024, NAMI-NYC presented Hsu with the "Breaking the Stigma Award" for her work in mental health awareness. St. Thomas Aquinas College created a scholarship in her name awarded each year to a student pursuing a career in mental health. Hsu is also an adoption advocate after adopting her daughter Rosie from China in 2004. She shared her journey of adopting as a single mom with a multi-part series Bringing Rosie Home, using personal home videos that took viewers on the long process including the trip to China. It was nominated for an Emmy Award and won a New York AP Broadcasters Award for Best Feature. Hsu paddled for years on a championship dragon boating team called Women in Canoe. Hsu lives in New York City with her rescue dog Lilo.

== See also ==
- Chinese Americans in New York City
- New Yorkers in journalism
