= Wildstorm Thunderbook =

DC Comics comic book anthology

The Wildstorm Thunderbook
- Cover art by Dan Norton

Publication information
- Publisher: DC Comics/Wildstorm
- Publication date: 2000
- Main character(s): Gen^{13}, Grifter, Jet, Cybernary 2.0, DV8

The Wildstorm Thunderbook is a comic book anthology that was published by DC Comics/Wildstorm in 2000.

== Stories ==
This prestige format one-shot relaunched a few characters such as Cybernary 2.0 and Jet, and featured the following stories:

- Wham! (Gen^{13})
- Professionals (Grifter)
- Family Matters (Jet)
- Return to Gamorra (Cybernary 2.0)
- Down and Out with the Deviants (DV8)
