= University Laboratory School =

Coordinates: 21.297866°N 157.821635°W

Location
- 1776 University Avenue; Honolulu, Hawaiʻi 96822; United States

Information
- Type: Public charter school, College-prep; Laboratory school
- Established: 1895
- Principal: A. Keoni Jeremiah
- Grades: K–12
- Enrollment: 450~ (2015-2016)
- Colors: Green and White
- Athletics conference: ILH
- Team name: Junior Rainbows
- Affiliations: University of Hawaiʻi at Mānoa
- Website: www.universitylaboratoryschool.org

University Laboratory School (ULS) is a charter school in Honolulu, Hawai‘i, United States, and it serves students from grades K-12. Prior to 2002, the school was known as the Education Laboratory School or University High School (for grades 9 through 12) when it was a part of the College of Education at the University of Hawaiʻi at Mānoa.

It is not to be confused with Punahou School, which occupied some of the university's buildings when the U.S. military displaced them from their campus during World War II.

== History ==
The school was founded as the laboratory school to the Teacher's College at the University of Hawaiʻi and dates back to 1895 when a teacher training department was formed at Honolulu High School, located in Princess Ruth's former mansion. Between 1939 and 1941, an elementary school was built to give elementary and pre-school education students hands-on experience. A permanent building for this purpose, Castle Memorial Hall, was constructed at this time. It was a gift from Mary and Samuel Castle, who was one of the founders of Castle & Cooke.

Punahou School occupied Castle Memorial Hall and other buildings at the college during World War II (1942–1945). However, the college continued to operate.

Buildings for the high school were constructed after the war, with University High School Building 1 opening in 1943 and University High School Building 2 opening in 1948. University High School Building 3 opened in 1957. The Multipurpose Building opened in 1963, and the school graduated its first high school class in 1951.

In 1966, the school's focus changed to testing a curriculum developed by the college for use in the Hawai'i Public School system under what is now called the Curriculum Research and Development Group (CRDG). Since this time, admission to the school is based on creating a cross-section of the state's socio-economic groups to meet the needs of the testing of the curriculum materials. Over the years, CRDG increased its marketing area of the materials they develop across the United States and then internationally.

The university stopped funding the school in 1999 due to major budget cuts from the state of Hawai'i in the university's budget. Alumni and friends raised enough money to cover the loss of revenue for two years.

In 2001, the University Laboratory School became the charter school Education Laboratory School. The Hawai'i State Department of Education now contracts the CRDG to run the school, and the university allows the use of campus facilities in exchange for its use in testing CRDG materials.

== Notable alumni ==
- Steven S. Alm, retired judge, First Circuit (O`ahu) - Hawaii State Judiciary
- Ricky Andrews, NFL linebacker
- Egan Inoue, American Brazilian jiu-jitsu practitioner, mixed martial artist and racquetball player
- Enson Inoue, Japanese American mixed martial artist
- Quinn Kelsey, opera singer
- Randall Duk Kim, actor
- Tyson Nam, American professional mixed martial artist
- Joe Onosai, former strongman competitor and American football player
- Gavin Petersen, college basketball coach
- Malia Ann Kawailanamalie Petersen, hula dancer
- Brook Power, Playboy Playmate of the Year 2017, Miss May 2016
- Norman Sakamoto, politician
- Bruce Yamashita, lawyer
- Konishiki Yasokichi, former sumo wrestler

== Controversy ==
Over the years, an unusually high proportion of the students have been children of university faculty members or relatives of politicians and other island notables. This has caused some to question the use of public money to fund this school, including former Governor Benjamin Cayetano, who essentially left the school without funds. Some view his actions as retaliatory since his children were not among the aforementioned individuals admitted.

=== Use of University of Hawaiʻi at Mānoa facilities ===
When the Educational Laboratory School became a separate entity from the University of Hawaiʻi at Mānoa in 2001, there was an understanding that the school would become self-sufficient within two years. This meant being able to pay for its maintenance and not need any more university assistance. In 2003 the chancellor of the University of Hawaiʻi at Mānoa Chancellor, Peter Englert, suggested that the university concentrate solely on research and cease managing the school. He also suggested giving them a one-year contract to prepare to pay rent or move out.

== Fire ==
On June 13, 2006, a fire erupted on campus in the University Elementary School building. The fire spread rapidly, causing a devastating amount of damage to the building. Among the sections lost were the orchestra room (along with newly refurbished orchestra equipment), the choir room, the performing arts room, the gym, and the athletic office. The police determined that arson was the cause of the fire, but after a year, there were still no arrests. The fire resulted in $6.5 million in damage, and it took a year to replace the destroyed rooms with new portables.
