= Hao Huang (pianist) =

American concert pianist

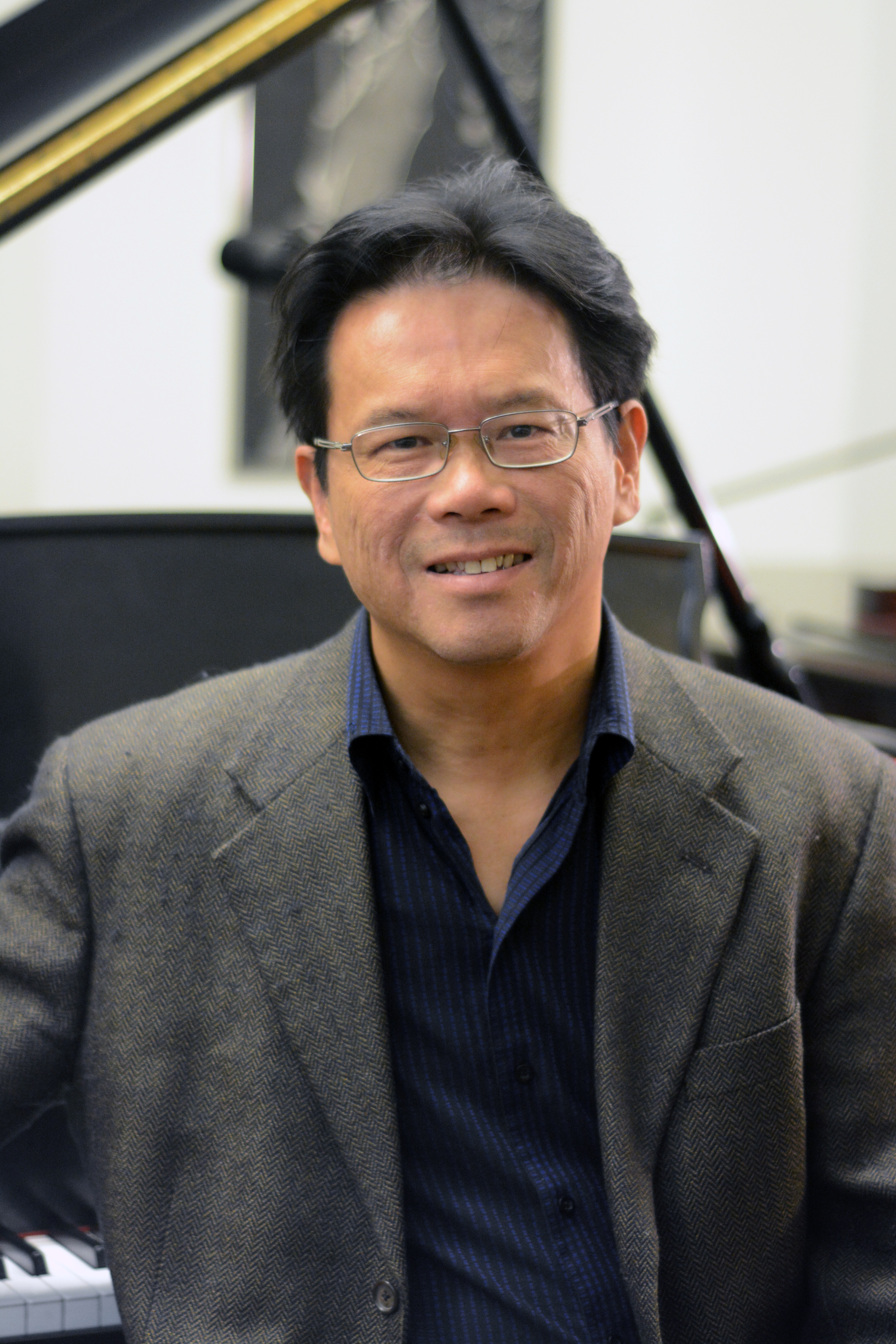
- Hao Huang, professor and pianist
- Born: Jersey City, New Jersey, U.S.A.

(Tseng) Hao Huang (黄俊豪) is a Hakka Chinese American concert pianist, published interdisciplinary scholar, narrator, playwright, composer and the Bessie and Cecil Frankel Endowed Chair in Music at Scripps College.

Huang has performed in over two dozen countries overseas and authored or co-authored approximately four dozen journal articles and book chapters on topics in Western classical music, popular music, ethnomusicology, music history, anthropology, environmental studies, women's studies, American Studies and Humanities. His first mentor was Seymour Bernstein.

== Education ==
Awarded the Leonard Bernstein Scholarship at Harvard College at Harvard University, Huang was referred to study with Leon Fleisher. Graduating with an A.B. cum laude in music, Huang was selected by audition for the national Frank Huntington Beebe Award for European Study which supported a tour of England, France, Switzerland and Italy. Upon returning to the States, he studied with Beveridge Webster at the Juilliard School on a piano scholarship, earning an M.M. in piano. Huang finished his academic studies as a Graduate Council Fellow at the State University of New York at Stony Brook, earning a D.M.A. in piano performance degree under the guidance of Charles Rosen and Gilbert Kalish.

== Career ==
Huang is the Bessie and Cecil Frankel Endowed Chair in Music at Scripps College. As a four-time United States Information Agency Artistic Ambassador to Europe, Africa and the Middle East, he was a featured performer at the George Enescu Festival and the Barcelona Cultural Olympiad. Huang has performed as a recitalist, concerto soloist and chamber musician with the Mei Duo and the Gold Coast Trio in the U.K., Austria, Hungary, Germany, Italy, Spain, Portugal, Poland, Romania, the PRC, Taiwan, New Zealand, South Africa, Mexico, Belize, Brazil and other nations. He has appeared on television and radio broadcasts both in the USA and abroad, and gave an Artist/Educator interview for The Piano Education Page.

Huang's essay "The Parable of the Grasshoppers" was honored as American Music Teacher's 1995 Article of the Year by the Music Teachers National Association. Other scholarly articles have been published in refereed journals in Hungary, Russia, UK, Greece, Japan, the PRC and the USA, of which the most frequently cited are “Why Chinese people play Western classical music: Transcultural roots of music philosophy” in International Journal of Music Education 30(2), 2012; “Yaogun Yinyue: rethinking mainland Chinese rock ‘n’roll” in Popular music 20(1), 2001; book chapter “The Oekuu Shadeh of Ohkay Owingeh” in Voices from Four Directions: Contemporary Translations of the Native Literatures of North America, U of Nebraska Press 2004; “Billie Holiday and tempo rubato: Understanding rhythmic expressivity”, co-author Rachel V. Huang, in Annual Review of Jazz Studies 7, 1994; “Speaking with spirits: The Hmong Ntoo Xeeb new year ceremony”, co-author B Sumrongthong, in Asian folklore studies, 2004. Huang's scholarly work has been recognized by The Chronicle of Higher Education, The Washington Post and National Public Radio’s “Morning Edition.”

In 2020, Huang's debut play, “BUBONIC PLAGUE: Fear, Loathing and Love in San Francisco (1900, The Year of the Rat)” was premiered as a winner of the Annual New Play Competition of the Pomona College Theater Department (Play Fest). A year later, Hao Huang initiated and narrated the nationally acclaimed podcast about the 1871 LA Chinatown massacre (authored and produced by Micah Huang), "Blood on Gold Mountain," that reached #23 in the USA in the history category of Apple Podcasts. The podcast was featured on National Public Radio, the Washington Post, Spectrum News 1, the digital media outlet NowThis News, KPBS Public Media and others. In fall 2022, his self-authored podcast play, "坚持 Jianchi/Perseverance," registered over half a million hits on Baidu in the PRC.

Subsequently in fall 2023, he co-curated the exhibition “Remembering the Caretakers of the Land; Materials on Southern Californian and Southwest Native American Peoples” with Jennifer Martinez Wormser, Director of Denison Library in conjunction with the performance event "íyo’toróvim yaraarkokre ‘eyoo’ooxono (We the Caretakers Remember our Land)" at Scripps College. In Spring 2025, Huang co-produced and directed "Turtle Island/Abya Yala: Indigenous Lands," sponsored by the Holmes Performing Arts Fund of the Claremont Colleges. That spring, he also was a visiting lecturer for the Centre for Research on Slavery and Indenture (CRSI) and the Faculty of Social Sciences and Humanities (FSSH), University of Mauritius.

In January 2026, Huang collaborated with dancer Kevin Williamson in a music + dance performance of "blue" at Odyssey Theatre in Santa Monica.

== Awards and honors ==
Awarded the national Overman Foundation first prize, the Van Cliburn Piano Award at the Interlochen Center for the Arts, the Leonard Bernstein Scholarship at Harvard University, the Frank Huntington Beebe Grant for European Study, Huang was chosen to be a USIA Artistic Ambassador as a winner of the David Bruce Smith National Competition. Selected as an NEH Scholar for the National Endowment of the Humanities Summer Seminar, “National Identity in China: the New Politics of Culture” at East–West Center, University of Hawaiʻi at Mānoa., Huang served later as a 2008 Fulbright Scholar in American Studies and Music at Eötvös Loránd University in Budapest, Hungary. Huang was awarded a 2011 National Endowment for the Humanities Teaching Development Fellowship for his teaching project, “Bridging Cultures”, one of 9 awarded nationally from 218 applications. In 2012, he was selected as an American Council on Education Fellow at Queens College NYC with support from the ACE Council of Fellows Fund for the Future. Huang was a National Endowment for the Humanities Summer Scholar at the last international NEH seminar "Arts, Architecture and Devotional Interaction in England, 1200–1600", York UK in 2014.

In 2019, the W.K. Kellogg Foundation's Truth, Racial Healing & Transformation (TRHT) program granted an award to Huang as creative producer of a multimedia performance event in Pico House in partnership with the Chinese American Museum of LA, about the Los Angeles Chinese massacre of 1871, one of the worst race lynchings that ever took place on the West Coast of the United States. In collaboration with the UCLA Asian American Studies Center, Huang was presented with the 2021 UCLA Chancellor’s Arts’ Initiative Award as executive producer of the “Chinatown Elegy” transarts/interdisciplinary events (featuring the Chinese Music Ensemble at UCLA, duo singers Emma Gies and Micah Huang, body movement artist Young-Tseng Wong, dance choreography by Kevin Williamson) that commemorated the 150th anniversary of the Los Angeles Chinese massacre of 1871, performed at El Pueblo de Los Ángeles Historical Monument and on the Wood Steps at Bowling Green, Scripps College. These performances were attended by US Representative Judy Chu, Los Angeles city councilman Kevin de León, UCLA Chancellor Gene D. Block and others. In early 2022, under the aegis of Scripps College and in partnership with the USC Pacific Asia Museum, Huang served as Project Director of a National Endowment for the Arts (NEA) Grants for Arts three-part interarts performance event, American Dreams – Asian Nightmares (composed and produced by Micah Huang), that explored the rich and often bittersweet experiences of Asian Americans in California.

As a playwright and a poet, Huang was one of three authors awarded a 2022 California Writers Residency at Yefe Nof near Lake Arrowhead, California; later in summer 2022, he was an artist-in-residence as a composer at La Macina di San Cresci in Greve in Chianti, Italy. Huang was selected as a Spring 2025 artist-in-residence as a composer and poet at the Dorland Mountain Arts Colony.
