= Kwang-Ping Hsu =

United States Coast Guard Captain

- Born: 1936; Shandong
- Died: 11 December 2007 (aged 70–71)
- Resting place: Arlington National Cemetery
- Alma mater: United States Coast Guard Academy
- Occupation: Military personnel
- Employer: United States Coast Guard (–1992)
- Children: Cindy Hsu
- Rank: captain

Kwang-Ping Hsu (1936 – December 11, 2007) was a United States Coast Guard Captain and the first foreign-born graduate from the United States Coast Guard Academy.

== Personal life ==
In 1936, Hsu was born in Shandong province in China. His father was a professor at Beijing University who studied pathology. His father emigrated to the United States in 1945 for a teaching position at the University of Virginia. In 1947, Hsu, his mother, and his sister would follow his father and emigrate to the United States. The entire family settled in Charlottesville, Virginia. Hsu would go on to marry Chinese-American Rosemary Hu. They had two children, David Hsu and Cindy Hsu. David Hsu would go onto become an Army Lieutenant colonel.

== Education ==
Hsu had applied to the United States Coast Guard Academy in 1957. Hsu was admitted to the Academy and became the first foreign born cadet at the U.S. Coast Guard Academy when he graduated in 1962.

Hsu went to the Naval Air Station Pensacola to complete flight training where he earned his wings at the Naval Aviation School. At the beginning of his career, he flew HC-130 Hercules aircraft.

== Career ==
After graduating from Naval Aviation School, Hsu achieved the rank of lieutenant commander within ten years. He earned two Coast Guard Air Medals for exceptional air rescue efforts. He was station commander of Naval Air Station Barbers Point in Hawaii. In 1986, Hsu flew the first U.S. military aircraft to visit China since 1947 while at Barbers Point.

Hsu served at the Pentagon as Coast Guard liaison to the Joint Chiefs of Staff during the First Gulf War. He was awarded the Joint Service Meritorious Unit Award and Joint Service Commendation Medal for his work during operations Desert Shield and Desert Storm. During his service, he mentored Vivien Crea, who became vice commandant of the Coast Guard and the highest-ranking woman in the history of the service.

Hsu retired from the Coast Guard in 1992. In retirement he worked as a photographer.

== Death and legacy ==
Due to complications from a brain tumor, Hsu died on December 11, 2007. He is buried in the Arlington National Cemetery. In 2012, The Coast Guard Academy inducted Hsu into their Hall of Heroes.
