= Ruth Chan Jang =

Ruth Chan Jang is one of the first documented Asian American women to have joined the Women's Army Corps in 1943.

== Early life ==
Ruth Chan was born in 1922 in Walnut Grove, California to Chuck Wing Chan and Lum Sue Ying who operated the Happy Cafe in the Locke district of Sacramento, California. Her brother Edward was also in the army in World War II.

== Military career ==
After joining the WACs at 21 years old, Chan was sent to Fort Des Moines, Iowa for basic training and then Moody Field, Georgia for training as a clerk messenger. She would later be stationed at Mitchell Field in New York and be promoted to corporal. In New York, she worked with wounded soldiers and often took them on trips to Radio City Music Hall. She was discharged in 1946.

== Post war life ==
After returning to Sacramento, she married 1st Lieutenant Harry Jang, a B-17 navigator who had flown 35 missions with the 367th Bomber Squadron, 306th Bombardment Group at RAF Thurleigh near Bedford, Bedfordshire, England. Harry earned a Distinguished Flying Cross and two Air Medals during his service.

She worked for the State of California and the Sacramento Unified School District as a translator. At age 56, Ruth earned a bachelor's degree in Early Childhood Education and Nutrition.

She and Harry had three children Sarah, Harry Kean and Gwen. Harry died in 1997 and is buried in Arlington National Cemetery. Harry and Ruth were recognized with a Congressional Gold Medal in 2020.
