= Bruce Yamashita =

US Marine corps officer

Bruce I. Yamashita
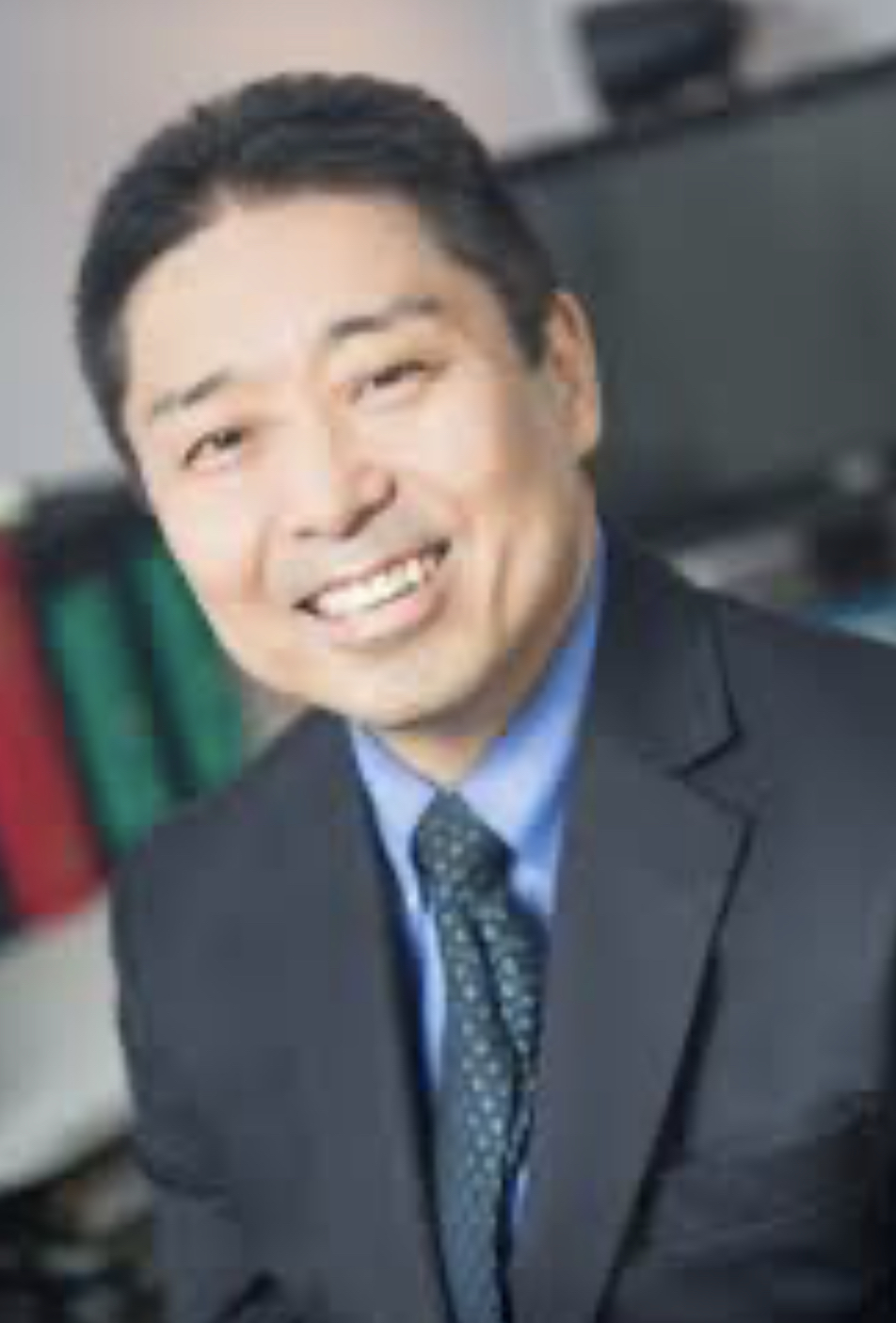
- Bruce at his job as lawyer
- Born: Honolulu, Hawaii
- Military career
- Allegiance: United States
- Branch: United States Marine Corps Reserves
- Service years: 1989-2009
- Rank: Captain
- Other work: Lawyer

Bruce I. Yamashita is a Japanese American lawyer and a former officer in the United States Marine Corps Reserves. His successful legal case against institutional racial discrimination at the Officer Candidate School of the Marine Corps became the subject of a 2003 documentary titled A Most Unlikely Hero, as well as an autobiography titled Fighting Tradition: A Marine's Journey to Justice.

== Background ==
Bruce Yamashita was a Japanese American who was born in Hawaii. His grandparents left Japan to reside in Hawaii, making Bruce Yamashita a third-generation American. Yamashita graduated from the University of Hawaii Lab School and the University of Hawaii in 1979. He was also a former delegate to the Hawaii Constitutional Convention. Yamashita joined the Marines in February 1989.

== Career ==
With expectations and high hopes, Yamashita was determined to become an exceptional Marine. However, he was not only challenged by the brutality of the boot camp itself, but he was also attacked with ethnic taunts by the non-commissioned training officers. “You speak English?” and “We don’t want your kind around here; go back to your country!” were some of the examples of racial remarks that were made by a drill sergeant and other instructors. On April 7, 10 weeks after his enrollment in the Marines, Yamashita was ordered to report to the battalion headquarters, only to learn that he was being disenrolled. On top of that, he was insulted by the commanding officer and the rest of the staff in the headquarters. Being a minority and one of the first few non-white people who joined the Marines, Yamashita was shocked by his experience. "I thought, 'Gee, I wish I was just white, maybe 5-10, 180 pounds,' " Yamashita recalled of his Quantico experience. "Then nobody would bother you. . . . The worst thing you can do is complain about your civil rights and the Constitution." The Marines claimed that Yamashita was disenrolled solely because of his lack in performance and leadership failure. The Marine Corps inspector general, Maj. Gen. Hollis Davison apologized to Yamashita since he was “subjected to ethnic insensitivity”. However, he concluded that Yamashita would have failed anyway.

=== Court Case ===
Yamashita was determined to fight the racial prejudice and discrimination that he had faced during his time at the Marine Corps. With the encouragement and support from his family and friends, Yamashita challenged the Marine Corps’ decision. The Marine Corps responded with a campaign of deception. However, Yamashita had acquired the support of Senator Daniel Inouye, an influential Democrat from Hawaii, the U.S. Commission on Civil Rights, and the entire Hawaiian congressional delegation. During that effort, the Marines initially offered to allow Yamashita to take the program again but he refused because he wanted to fight and clear his name. Then, the Marines offered to commission him as a second lieutenant if he agreed to attend six months of additional officer training and nine weeks of military legal training. He refused. A new Navy assistant secretary, Mr. Pang, had taken interest in Mr. Yamashita's case and followed the issue at the Senate Armed Service Committee. Mr Pang recommended the Navy Department's offer to Mr. Dalton and Dalton authorizes it because he thought that the outcome was fair for both Mr. Yamashita and the Department of Navy. On 18 March 1994, Bruce Yamashita was commissioned as a captain in the United States Marine Corps. Yamashita was 38 years old when, after 5 years of hard work and effort, he finally won his case against the Marine Corps . By that time, Yamashita was already an attorney in Washington and his fight resulted in a high level apology and the offer of the commission as a captain. In 1994, he stood in front of the crowd, with overwhelming joy and victory, and told the crowd that the victory means so more to him compared to five years ago. "His commissioning today is a tribute to his dedication, a tribute to his courage," said Rep. Norman Y. Mineta, a Japanese-American lawmaker and one of the members of Congress who backed Yamashita.

== Fighting Tradition ==
Fighting Tradition: A Marine's Journey to Justice is a book written by Yamashita about his struggle to fight and expose the racial discrimination against Asian Americans and other minorities within various levels of the Corps. The book covers in detail the story of Yamashita's 10 weeks of training and the racial harassment that he faced. In addition, Yamashita provides vignettes of life for second and third generation Japanese-Americans. Yamashita also tries to construct political meanings of Japanese-American identity in Hawaii. Yamashita did not intend to draw the stereotypes of Asian stoicism which has been part of the western thinking but some of his statements in the book indirectly points to that explanation. This is especially when he talked about how his parents never share with him about their experience of discrimination with hope to protect him from the harsh reality of the world or America. Overall, Fighting Tradition contributes to our understanding of the complexities of racism in a conservative society. It is a reminder of the power and importance of political mobilization by an individual to reach justice.

== A Most Unlikely Hero ==
A Most Unlikely Hero is a documentary in 2003 about Captain Yamashita and his battle against racism in the Marine Corps. It is a 60-minute film by Steve Okino and enfolds the story of the 10 weeks of training in the USMC, just like in the book, Fighting Tradition. Steve Okino was a member of the board of the Japanese American Citizens League (JACL). During Yamashita's battle against the Marines, the JACL was a lead supporter and Okino was involved with community relations and the media. After Yamashita won the case, Okino started directing and producing the film, A Most Unlikely Hero, which took him eight years.
