= Sang Hyun Lee =

American theologian

Sang Hyun Lee (1938 – 2023) was the Kyung-Chik Han Professor of Systematic Theology at Princeton Theological Seminary, and director of the institution's Program for Asian American Theology and Ministry. He specialized in systematic theology, Asian American theology, Jonathan Edwards, and God and the problem of evil. He held a Bachelor of Sacred Theology from Harvard Divinity School and a Ph.D. from Harvard University. He died on September 4, 2023.

== Publications ==
- The Philosophical Theology of Jonathan Edwards (Princeton University Press, 1988)
- The Works of Jonathan Edwards, volume 23, Writings on the Trinity, Grace, and Faith (Yale University Press, 2003)
- The Princeton Companion to Jonathan Edwards (Princeton University Press, 2005)
- From a Liminal Place: An Asian American Theology (Fortress Press, 2010)
