= Kamonegi (restaurant) =

Restaurant in Seattle, Washington, U.S.

- Interactive map of Kamonegi

Restaurant information
- Food type: Japanese
- Location: 1054 N 39th Street, Seattle, King, Washington, 98103, United States
- Coordinates: 47°39′14.7″N 122°20′39.7″W
- Website: kamonegiseattle.com

Kamonegi is a Japanese restaurant in Seattle's Fremont neighborhood, in the U.S. state of Washington.

The menu includes soba bowls and tempura. Kamonegi was the Seattle Metropolitan's 2018 Restaurant of the Year. Jessica Voelker and Stefan Milne included the business in Conde Nast Traveler's 2021 list of Seattle's 21 best restaurants. Naomi Tomky included the restaurant in Thrillist's 2022 guide to "where to eat in Seattle right now". Aimee Rizzo included Kamonegi in The Infatuation's 2023 overview of Seattle's 25 best restaurants.

The restaurant has been featured on Hulu's Eater's Guide to the World.

== See also ==
- List of Japanese restaurants
- Mutsuko Soma
