= Mutsuko Soma =

Japanese chef and restaurateur

- Born: Tochigi, Japan
- Education: Art Institute of Seattle
- Known for: handmade soba noodles
- Culinary career
- Current restaurant: Kamonegi
- Award won: Food and Wine Magazine's Best New Chefs

Mutsuko Soma is a James Beard Award finalist and Japanese chef and owner of Kamonegi and its sister bar, Hannyatou. She specializes in handmade soba noodles and is the only chef on the West Coast to roll soba by hand.

== Early life ==
Soma was born and raised in Tochigi, Japan. As a child, Soma watched her grandmother make soba by hand for her family. Throughout her interviews, she names this as a chief source of inspiration for incorporating handmade soba into her restaurants. Additionally, at age 16, she began working part-time at a restaurant, sparking her interest for a career path as a chef.

== Career ==
In 2002, Soma came to the United States to study at the Art Institute of Seattle. After graduation, she worked in various Seattle kitchens, including Harvest Vine, Saito, and Chez Shea in Pike Place Market. At age 25, Soma returned to Tokyo and became a WSET Level 3 certified kikizakeshi (sake sommelier). Soma got stuck in Japan due to issues with her visa, which prompted her to enroll in a two-year soba-making program. During this program, while learning all aspects of the process from grinding buckwheat to recipe adaptation, Soma learned that Washington state is one of the largest producers of buckwheat. This fact inspired her to create a soba restaurant in Seattle.

On November 4, 2012, Soma opened Miyabi 45th in Seattle's Wallingford neighborhood. The restaurant specialized in handmade soba and received praise from food critics and the wider community. Soma received a feature on Serious Eats for her work at Miyabi 45th, where she gave a step-by-step guide to her process for soba-making. Additionally, Miyabi 45th was featured in Bon Appetit Magazine's 2013 article, "Where to Eat in Seattle, Washington." In January 2016, Soma departed Miyabi 45th to go on maternity leave.

On October 13, 2017, Soma opened up Kamonegi in Fremont, which specializes in tempura and handmade soba noodles. The restaurant also received critical acclaim, earning positive reviews from The Seattle Times and The Stranger. Furthermore, Soma partnered with Washington State University's Bread Lab to experiment with different genetic variations of buckwheat in Kamonegi. In 2017, Soma was named Eater Seattle's Chef of the Year. In April 2019, Soma was named one of Food and Wine Magazine's Best New Chefs.

In 2019, Soma opened Hannyatou, a sake bar, next to Kamonegi. That fall, Soma was featured in The New York Times article, "The New Generation of Chefs Pushing Japanese Food in Unexpected Directions."

In 2020, Soma was named the winner of Starchefs Seattle Rising Stars Award Winner. That same year, Soma won a $50,000 grand prize for the best Original Cup Noodles flavor.

In 2022, Soma was named a finalist for the James Beard Award for Best Chef: Northwest and Pacific.

== Personal life ==
Soma is married and has a daughter.
