= Sam Chang =

Taiwanese-American businessman and developer

- 張善良
- Born: July 29, 1960 (age 65); Taipei, Taiwan
- Occupation: Real estate developer
- Children: Danny Chang; Kevin Chang; Jeffrey Chang; Jennifer Chang

Sam Chang
- Chinese: 張善良
Transcriptions
Standard Mandarin
- Hanyu Pinyin: Zhāng Shànliáng

Sam Chang (Chinese name: Shen Leong Chang) is a Taiwanese-American businessman and developer in New York City.

== Background ==
A native of Taiwan, Chang dropped out of high school to help his parents manage a Los Angeles hotel. Prior to becoming a developer in New York City, Chang operated hotels and restaurants in the suburbs of Baltimore, Maryland. His first New York project was in 1997.

== Business ==
Chang is the chairman of McSam Hotel Group, and is one of the largest hotel developers in New York City. His company has completed 25 hotels in the five boroughs of New York City, with a stated goal of at least 50. He currently has 4,000 rooms under development for a variety of national hotel chains. He is the first Asian American to build a high-rise hotel in Manhattan.

Many of Chang's hotels are designed by New York architects Gene Kaufman and Michael Kang. Tritel Construction (of which he is a 50% partner) handles much of the construction.

Chang was honored as a 2007 "Developer of the Year" by Hilton Hotels, for the multiple Hilton properties he is developing in Manhattan and Connecticut.

== Investments ==
Chang has a 7.5 percent stake in Trump Entertainment Resorts.

== Personal life ==
Chang has four children: Danny, Kevin, Jeffrey, and Jennifer.

== See also ==
- Chinese Americans in New York City
