= Cybernary =

- Cover of the first issue

Publication information
- Publisher: Wildstorm
- First appearance: Deathblow #1 (April 1993)
- Created by: Nick Manabat (artist); Steve Gerber (writer)

In-story information
- Alter ego: Katrina Cupertino/Yamiko Gamorra
- Team affiliations: Savant Garde
- Abilities: Cybernetic augmentation: Possesses enhanced physical attributes; Bionic augmentation; Dual Mind; Combat Expertise; Numerous functions (sensors, combat computers and advanced weaponry); Adaptive nanotechology; Pheromone manipulation; Blade shifting; Telempathy; Technopathy

Cybernary is a comic book series created by comic book artist Nick Manabat with writer Steve Gerber and published by American company Wildstorm Productions in 1995. It tells the story of Katrina Cupertino (Cybernary), a cybernetic anti-heroine carrying the consciousness of Yamiko Gamorra.

== Publication history ==
Cybernary began as a backup story to Jim Lee's run on Deathblow, but Nick Manabat's work on the series was cut short by his death from Hodgkin lymphoma. Gerber continued the storyline through a 1995 mini-series with art by Jeff Rebner and Richard Friend. On this post-Manabat series, Gerber remarked, "The artist, unfortunately, had no feel for the kind of cyber-civilization we were trying to portray. I admit, I lost interest a couple of issues into the series."

A second Cybernary, based on Yamiko Gamorra herself, was created in a short story written by Tommy Yune for the Wildstorm Thunderbook that overlapped with some of the events of The Authority. The story was continued by Joe Harris for a six-part Cybernary 2.0 limited series that started in 2001.

== Fictional character biography ==
Katrina's story takes place in the Wildstorm Universe on the fictional post-apocalyptic island of Gamorra. She is a member of the American colony. Her parents die in a suspicious accident and Katrina opts for a life on the street. With her 'street smarts' and low-level telepathy, she prospered in the criminal circles. She teams up with a male partner named Cisco. During one mission, there were mistakes and Vandalla, one of Gamorra's main scientists, ends up with custody of Cisco. Her rescue attempt seemingly works, but Cisco is not truly freed and Katrina herself is vastly altered. While her outside looks like a very carefully made nympho-droid, her insides are built for killing. Not only that, her mind also contains the consciousness of Kaizen Gamorra's lost daughter Yamiko. Intended as a present for Kaizen himself, she instead escapes and helps overthrow him.

Cybernary spends some time dimension-hopping with Savant's unofficial super-hero team called Savant Garde. There she fought side by side with Savant herself, Mr. Majestic, the cat-girl Sheba, and many other heroes, some of whom resembled Cybernary herself. Cicsco becomes part of the team, but he is now the large cyborg known as Met-L. Also joining the team is the murderous mercenary Innuendo, who assists the heroes despite his own dark nature.

After the World's End event, the Yamiko-Cybernary is able to make her way to the now floating island of Gamorra, trying to enact vengeance for her father. Kaizen Gamorra convinces her to join forces, taking her place at his side as the heiress of the ruined world that Gamorra intends to rule. As her first mission, Cybernary is sent to capture the last free stronghold on Earth, the ruins of the former Carrier. After having subdued Hawksmoor and taken him to Gamorra to be tortured by her father, her prisoner eventually escaped into the city itself since being in the last urban environment on earth had healed and strengthened him. Just before they could commence battle after having intercepted him as he rampaged through Gamorra city, he quickly disappears from view only to be accosted by Engineer later who removes all of her cybernetics and possibly along with the secondary persona of Yamiko Gamorra leaving her as Katrina Cupertino again.

Some time after an invasion by the Knights of Khera, Katrina somehow regained her cyborg additions, as noted by the antlers and outfit she sported as Cybernary. She served under Zannah as squad commander and combat instructor to the former's Coda in Zanzibar. She was on guard duty while a skulking Midnighter was prowling in the background. Although she took notice of him while training new coda recruits, she chose to continue the seminar instead of reporting him. She eventually called him out after finding the heart of their operation, stating Zealot wanted to see him.

=== DC Black Label ===
A revamped Cybernary is depicted in the Waller vs. Wildstorm series. In this continuity, Ivana Baiul is recruited by Deathstroke's private military outfit to work from the Pacific island of Gamorra. Quickly sidled with crushing debt, she is enticed to be a test subject for experimental enhancements for a large payout. She is then killed so that her cybernetics can be transferred to daughter of Kaizen Gamorra, President-Elect Yumiko Gamorra, who wants their power to kill the rebels that oppose her plan to open the country to US businesses. Here, "Katrina Cupertino" is a codename for the entire Cybernary cybernetic system. The investigation of Baiul's death by Jackson King leads to Lois Lane's expose about Checkmate's Cold War black ops.
