= Laura Chang =

American journalist

- Born: Seattle, Washington, U.S.
- Status: married
- Education: University of Washington (BS)
- Occupations: editor, New York Times Booming blog
- Notable credit(s): The New York Times, Seattle Times

Laura Chang (born in Seattle, Washington) is an American journalist.

== Education ==
Chang graduated from the University of Washington in 1984 with a Bachelor of Science in communications, with an emphasis in psychology.

== Career ==
Chang edited the Booming blog of The New York Times, a role she took on after spearheading the paper's coverage of the 10th anniversary of 9/11. Previously, she had been science editor since 2004; before that she was assistant science editor beginning in 1998, then deputy science editor.

Chang joined the Times in 1990. She began as a copy editor on the national desk, then became assignment editor. She also served as a special projects editor, where she handled projects on welfare reform, the erosion of privacy and the spread of E. coli contamination. She was also the Times editor who stayed up all night excerpting the Unabomber Manifesto.

== Personal ==
Chang plays violin with the Park Avenue Chamber Symphony in Manhattan and other chamber music groups.

== Bibliography ==
=== As editor ===
- Scientists at Work: Profiles of Today's Groundbreaking Scientists from Science Times. New York: McGraw-Hill Companies, 2000. ISBN 0-07-135882-X ISBN 978-0071358828

== See also ==
- Chinese Americans in New York City
- New Yorkers in journalism
