= Mara Huling Langevin =

- Born: August 20, 1969 (age 57); Hollywood, California
- Education: US Coast Guard Academy 1991
- Military career
- Branch: United States Coast Guard
- Service years: 1991-2001
- Rank: Lieutenant Commander

Mara Michelle Huling Langevin is the first woman of native American descent to graduate from the U.S. Coast Guard Academy and the first Asian American female aviator in the Coast Guard.

== Early life ==
Mara Michelle Huling was born 20 August 1969 in Hollywood, California to a U.S. Navy Aviation Boatswain's Mate and Korean War Veteran father and a kindergarten teacher mother. She is the youngest of five children and is of Japanese and Cherokee descent. She visited USCG Air Station Los Angeles as a teenager and was impressed by the rescue pilots. Huling applied to all the military academies and was accepted to the Merchant Marine Academy, West Point, Naval Academy and the Coast Guard Academy. She chose the USCGA because she wanted to save lives.

== Coast Guard career ==
Huling was an honor student at the Coast Guard Academy, Commandant of Cadets’ list all four years, captain of the volleyball team and All New England honors in the Pentathlon for indoor track and field. She graduated in 1991.

As an Ensign, Hulling was a deck watch officer on the USCGC Resolute (WMEC-620) stationed in Astoria, Oregon. In 1993 she went to flight school in Florida and became a helicopter pilot. In 1995, Huling was stationed at Coast Guard Air Station Barbers Point, Hawaii, flying search and rescue missions in the HH-65A Dolphin.

Lt. Commander Langevin became an instructor pilot and taught at the Coast Guard's Aviation Training Center (ATC) in Mobile, Alabama.

== Post guard career ==
After leaving the Coast Guard, Langevin was a Humanitarian Assistance Advisor to the Military with The U.S. Agency for International Development’s (USAID) and then an advisor to the US PACOM Geographic Combatant Command and the Department of Defense. She deployed to Kuwait in 2009 to support internally displaced persons response for three months. She has served as a Civil-Military Affairs Coordinator (CMAC) in Gaza, Turkey and Pakistan.

== Personal life ==
Langevin is married to Marine Corps Colonel Marc Langevin (retired) and has two children.
