= Ron J. MacLaren =

United States Navy officer (retired)

Ron J. MacLaren is a retired Rear Admiral who served in the United States Navy from June 1979 to October 2016. He had an extensive military and civilian career, serving as a Navy reserve officer while working in hospital management before being called to active duty and eventually retiring in 2016. MacLaren was the first Korean American to become an admiral in the Navy.

== Early life and education ==
Ron J. MacLaren was born in Seoul, South Korea. He was raised in Mexico, Peru, and the Panama Canal Zone. In high school, MacLaren enrolled in the Junior Reserve Officers' Training Corps at the urging of his mother.

MacLaren attended the University of Southern California, where he got his Bachelor of Arts in Economics. MacLaren then attended Auburn University, where he got his Master of Business Administration.

== Military career ==
=== Reserve Officers' Training Corps ===
While obtaining his undergraduate degree at the University of Southern California, MacLaren was a part of the Reserve Officers' Training Corps. In June 1979, he received his commission as a Navy Supply Corps officer, starting his military career. He served in this position until June 1983.

=== United States Navy Reserve ===
MacLaren was a Navy reserve officer from June 1983 to March 2010, specializing in logistics. During this time, he held command of the Navy Cargo Handling and Port Group 3, the Navy Supply Support Battalion 2, the Naval Operational Logistics Support unit, the Navy Cargo Handling Battalion (NCHB) 12 and the Naval Supply Center Pensacola 109. MacLaren also served as Chief of Staff of the Navy Expeditionary Logistics Support Force, Deputy Director of the United States Pacific Command Deployment and Distribution Operations Center, Deputy Director of Logistics, United States Joint Forces Command 206, and Logistics Response Cell Watch Chief of the United States Atlantic Command 206.

From 2007 to 2008, MacLaren supported Operation Iraqi Freedom and Operation Enduring Freedom as the Group Commander of the Navy Expeditionary Logistics Support Group Forward Golf. From October 2009 to March 2010, MacLaren served as the Assistant Deputy Chief of Staff for Logistics, Fleet Supply and Ordnance, US Pacific Fleet.

=== Active duty ===
MacLaren was recalled to active duty where he served as Rear Admiral from March 2010 to March 2016. He was the Director of the Defense Logistics Agency in Fort Belvoir, Virginia and the Director of the Joint Reserve Force (JRF) Defense Logistics Agency.

In his positions, MacLaren led the Joint Contingency Acquisition Support Office (JCASO), led the Central Asian States, Southern Caucasus and Baltic States Local Procurement Initiative, and spearheaded all strategic planning, direction and execution of a 700 joint reserve force consisting of Army, Navy, Air Force, Marine Corps and civilians.

=== Awards ===
MacLaren has won three Meritorious Service Medals, four Navy Commendation Medals, and two Navy Achievement Medals.

On August 20, 2011, the Asian Heritage Society of San Diego presented the first-ever "Diversity Pioneer Award" to MacLaren for his "illustrious naval career and his efforts to recruit more Asian Americans to flag officer ranks."

== Healthcare administration career ==
During his time as a reserve officer, MacLaren worked in the healthcare management industry. From August 1983 to August 1988, MacLaren was the Director of Materials Management at Humana Hospital in Enterprise, Alabama, and from August 1988 to February 1993, MacLaren was the Director of Materials Management at Humana Hospital in Montgomery, Alabama.

From March 1993 to December 1995, MacLaren was the Chief Operating Officer for the East Montgomery Medical Center in Montgomery, Alabama. In January 1996, he was promoted to Chief Executive Officer, where he worked until January 1998.

From May 1998 to January 2000, MacLaren was the Chief Executive Officer for the Select Specialty Hospitals in Houston, Texas before transitioning to be the Chief Executive Officer for the Cleveland Regional Medical Center in Cleveland, Texas in January 2004. MacLaren retired from his position in September 2004.

From February 2006 to March 2010, MacLaren was the Health Director for the Wampanoag Tribe of Gay Head on Martha's Vineyard in Aquinnah, Massachusetts. From April 2015 to April 2016, MacLaren was the Executive Director for the Martha Vineyard Camp Meeting Association.

== Other involvement ==
From July 2018 to October 2019, MacLaren served as a Board Member of the Caspian Policy Center. From October 2020 onwards, MacLaren has been on its Advisory Board, serving as a Senior Fellow. He has written policy briefs on Central Asia and the area surrounding the Caspian Sea, as well as a 30-year reflection.

From November 2019 to March 2020, MacLaren was the Executive Director for the Navy Supply Corps Foundation an organization that "provides programs and services to support the Navy Supply Corps Community and promote its heritage and traditions". He wrote several articles in their newsletter, the Oakleaf.

Additionally, MacLaren is a member of the National Security Leaders of America, a bipartisan group of retired public service officers with a career background related to the military or national security. Recently, he was a signatory of an endorsement letter for Abigail Spanberger's re-election as the Representative for Virginia's 7th congressional district.

== Personal life ==
Ron and his current wife, Asli MacLaren, have two children together. Asli serves as a Senior Executive in the Federal Government and holds the rank of Commander in the Navy Reserves.

In the 2024 United States presidential election, MacLaren endorsed Kamala Harris.
