= Maangchi =

Korean-American YouTuber (born 1957)

Emily Kim
- Born: Kim Kwang-sook; 1957 (age 68–69); Yeosu, South Korea
- Occupations: YouTuber; author
- Spouse: David Seguin (m. 2009)

YouTube information
- Channel: Maangchi
- Years active: 2007–present
- Genre: Cooking show
- Subscribers: 6.52 million
- Views: 785 million

Korean name
- Hangul: 김광숙
- RR: Gim Gwangsuk
- MR: Kim Kwangsuk

Online handle
- Hangul: 망치
- Lit.: hammer
- RR: Mangchi
- MR: Mangch'i
- Last updated: August 4, 2026
- Website: maangchi.com

Emily Kim (born 1957), born Kim Kwang-sook (Korean: 김광숙) and known by her online handle Maangchi (망치), is a South Korean-born American YouTuber and author. She is notable for producing cooking videos centered around Korean cuisine. She was described by The New York Times as "YouTube's Korean Julia Child".

== Life ==
Kim was born in Yeosu, South Korea. Her family was involved in the seafood industry, and Kim learned how to cook from her female relatives.

In 1992, Kim and her husband moved to Columbia, Missouri, where Kim worked as a teacher. In Missouri, she found the quality, variety, and availability of Korean food to be lacking, and so she often cooked for other members of the local Korean-American community. She immigrated to Toronto, Canada, in 2002.

In 2003, she and her husband divorced, and with her two fully-grown children out of the house, Kim started playing MMO City of Heroes using the character name Maangchi, meaning "Hammer" in Korean. After this and up until 2007, Kim worked as a family counselor for a nonprofit organization.

=== Culinary career ===
Kim was introduced to YouTube's online cooking scene in 2007, inspiring her to begin making videos about Korean food, using the channel name "Maangchi". Her channel quickly grew in popularity, attributed to her upbeat attitude and her strict adherence to traditional Korean recipes. Along with her cooking videos on YouTube, Kim also runs a website at maangchi.com that includes a request section and discussion board for fans, along with additional photos and a podcast. In 2013, Kim worked together with Top Chef winner Kristen Kish on a PBS program called Lucky Chow, where she gave Kish a cooking lesson in traditional Korean cuisine that focused on kimchi and japchae.

Prompted by her YouTube channel's success, Kim published her first cookbook in 2015, titled Maangchi's Real Korean Cooking. Her second cookbook named Maangchi's Big Book of Korean Cooking was made with co-author Martha Rose Shulman and published by Rux Martin in 2019. The book discusses recipes alongside how to use certain cooking utensils and a picture guide to Korean ingredients. In March 2018, the South Korean Ministry of Agriculture, Food and Rural Affairs announced it would be collaborating with Kim and her brand to better showcase Korean foods to North American consumers.

As of August 2026, Kim's YouTube channel has 6.52 million subscribers.

== Bibliography ==
- —; Shulman, Martha Rose (2019). Maangchi's Big Book of Korean Cooking: From Everyday Meals to Celebration Cuisine. Rux Martin. ISBN 9781328988126.
- —; Chattman, Lauren (2015). Maangchi's Real Korean Cooking: Authentic Dishes for the Home Cook. Houghton Mifflin Harcourt. ISBN 9780544129894.
