= Nick Manabat =

Comic artist

- Born: Nicholas Anthony Manabat; September 2, 1972; British Hong Kong
- Died: November 5, 1995 (aged 23)
- Occupation: Comic book artist
- Years active: 1992–1995
- Known for: Cybernary

Nicholas Anthony Manabat (2 September 1972 – 5 November 1995) was a Filipino comic book artist, best known for co-creating Cybernary.

== Early life ==
Manabat was born in British Hong Kong. He was raised and educated in Brisbane, Australia from 1983 to 1990.

== Career ==
Manabat co-created Cybernary with writer Steve Gerber in 1992 for Wildstorm Productions. His illustration technique was marked by bold use of blacks in a heavy metal style. Cybernary was launched as a back-up story to Jim Lee's Deathblow comic series.

== Death ==
Manabat died from Hodgkin's lymphoma in 1995.
