= Ritu Raj =

Ritu Raj Ritu Raj
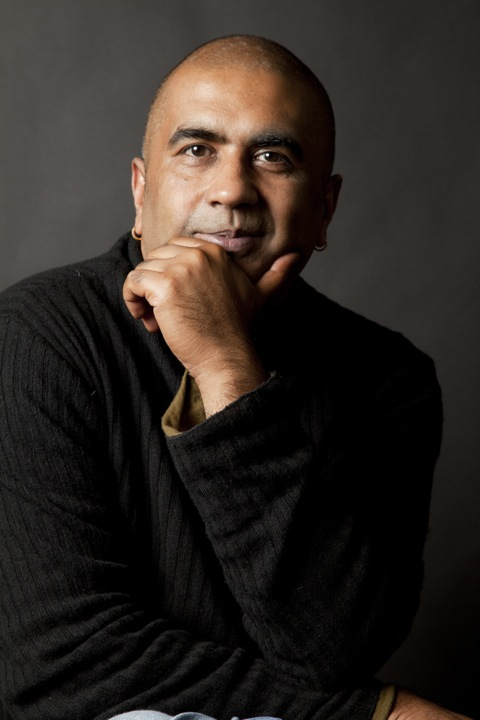
- Occupation: Entrepreneur
- Known for: Founder and CEO of Avasta, OrchestratorMail, Objectiveli and Wag Hotels

Ritu Raj is an entrepreneur based in California. Raj is the founder of Avasta, OrchestratorMail and Objectiveli, as well as Wag Hotels, a chain of luxury hotels for dogs and cats.

== Education and early career ==
Ritu Raj graduated from Kirori Mal College at Delhi University, and worked for IT consulting firms in Delhi before moving to the US in 1994. Upon his arrival in the US, he worked for a small startup, AT Systems, and was later an executive with TMP Worldwide.

== Chapter 2/Avasta ==
In 1999, Raj founded Chapter 2, an application service provider (ASP) that supports the business applications for companies as an outsourcing company running the companies' existing networks. The company based its name on the idea that chapter one of the internet was web site hosting, with chapter two being business application hosting. In 2000 the company secured $9.5 million in funding. That year they also opened offices that provided back-office operations, security management and call center operations services. As of 2001, the company had raised $50 million from investors. That year Chapter 2 was renamed Avasta - a name based on the Sanskrit word "vasta," meaning "to stand and remain" - in order to reflect the company's new services. In 2003, Avasta was acquired by NaviSite.

== Wag Hotels ==
Following Avasta, Raj was a partner with the information technology consulting firm Accenture. He was away from home and his dog frequently. This was the inspiration behind his venture Wag Hotels, a California-based line of luxury hotel for dogs and cats. In 2005, Wag opened its first location in West Sacramento. The company also operates Wag Store, a hotel-affiliated store. In 2007, Wag opened a location in San Francisco. In June 2007, the company also bought a stake in the Modesto-based pet quarterly publication, Wag Magazine.

== Other Ventures ==
In 2010, Raj co-founded OrchestratorMail, and serves as the company's CEO. An application that works on top of an existing user's email platform, OrchestratorMail organizes email into a set of categories. Users then use this differentiation to determine what emails to reply to first.

From 2011 to 2012, Raj was an Entrepreneur in Residence at Spring Ventures, LLC, a venture capital firm in San Francisco. While there, he helped launch SideCar, a ride-sharing app that connects drivers with people looking for rides. In exchange, passengers can give drivers a financial donation. The apps were initially banned, however new regulations have since allowed them to operate.

In 2012, Raj co-founded Objectiveli with Jonathan Yankovich. Objectiveli is a web application designed for companies to set and manage objectives and goals and track the outcomes in real-time.

== Artistic career ==
Ritu Raj began painting in 2020 during the COVID lockdowns in San Francisco, and began to paint on increasingly larger canvases and moved his practice to Phoenix, Arizona. His improvisational abstract art is based in various inspirations, such as the philosophy of Heidegger. Raj became a full time fine artist in 2024, after founding RituStudio in 2022. He has stated of his work that, “In my creative process, I let my intuition guide me, allowing images in my mind to take on a life of their own on the canvas. Foregoing sketches, I allow the colors to form their language - dynamic, unrestricted, and honest. This approach, coupled with my relentless pursuit of experimentation and medium exploration, gives my work a unique touch that defies pattern or style.”
