= List of Filipino Americans =

This is a list of Filipino Americans who have made significant contributions to the American culture, politics, or society. It also includes those with notable mentions in the American media.

To be included in this list, the person must have a Wikipedia article showing they are Filipino American or must have references showing they are Filipino American and are notable.

== List ==
=== Arts and letters ===
==== Dance ====
- Stella Abrera – ballet dancer
- Cheryl Burke – ballroom dancer, participant in Dancing with the Stars
- Ryan "Ryanimay" Conferido – member of Quest Crew and alumnus of So You Think You Can Dance
- Jeffrey Cirio – ballet dancer
- Napoleon D'umo – hip-hop choreographer on So You Think You Can Dance since season four and supervising choreographer for America's Best Dance Crew
- Angelica Generosa – ballet dancer
- Cris Judd – choreographer
- Charles Klapow – choreographer for all three High School Musical films, The Ice Tour, and The Cheetah Girls 2
- Sophia Laforteza – singer, dancer, and member of girl group Katseye
- Brian Puspos – choreographer
- Dominic "D-Trix" Sandoval – member of Quest Crew and alumnus of So You Think You Can Dance
- Ken San Jose – street dancer and singer

==== Education ====
- Craig Abaya. – Director of Digital Media & Entertainment Programs, San Francisco State University, 2000–2014
- Jeremy Castro Baguyos, M.Mus. – Professor of Music at the University of Nebraska Omaha and Principal Bass of the Des Moines Metro Opera Summer Music Festival Orchestra
- Catherine Ceniza Choy, Ph.D. – Professor of Ethnic Studies at University of California, Berkeley
- Leon O. Chua, Ph.D. – Contributor to both the nonlinear circuit theory and cellular neural network theory, and professor of electrical engineering and computer science at University of California at Berkeley and Purdue University
- Jose B. Cruz, Jr., Ph.D. – Distinguished Professor of Engineering, Ohio State University
- Talitha Espiritu, Ph.D. – Associate Professor of English at Wheaton College
- Raymundo Favila, Ph.D. – Mathematician contributing to stratifiable congruences and geometric inequalities
- Conrado Gempesaw, Ph.D. – 17th President, St. John's University, New York City
- Ruth Elynia S. Mabanglo, Ph.D. – Professor of Philippine Literature, University of Hawaii at Manoa; Presidential Citation for Meritorious Teaching, 1996
- Kevin Nadal, Ph.D. – Professor of Psychology, John Jay College of Criminal Justice; author, Filipino American Psychology: A Handbook of Theory, Research, and Clinical Practice; former president of Asian American Psychological Association
- Trinity Ordona, Ph.D. – Professor of American Studies, City College of San Francisco, 2001–present
- Baldomero Olivera, Ph.D. – Distinguished Professor of Biology, University of Utah in Salt Lake City, Utah; first Filipino American member of the United States National Academy of Sciences; 2007 Harvard University Scientist of the Year
- Rhacel Parrenas, Ph.D. – Professor of American Studies and Sociology at Brown University
- Vicente L. Rafael, Ph.D. – Professor of Southeast Asian history at Cornell University
- Robyn Rodriguez, Ph.D. –Professor and Chair of the Department of Asian American Studies at the University of California, Davis
- E. San Juan, Jr., Ph.D. – Fellow, W.E.B. Du Bois Institute, Harvard University
- Vivian M. Vasquez, Ph.D. – Multi-award-winning Professor of Education at American University in Washington, D.C.

==== Graphic arts ====
- Alfredo Alcala – comic book artist
- Lynda Barry – Filipino mestizo comic strip cartoonist and novelist; created prototype for TV hit series The Simpsons
- Don Figueroa – comic book artist for IDW Publishing and Dreamwave Entertainment, worked on various Transformers titles
- Rafael Kayanan – comic book artist and master level instructor in Sayoc Kali
- Nick Manabat – creator of Cybernary, comic book artist for Wildstorm Productions
- Dom Orejudos - graphic artist known as Etienne
- Van Partible – creator of Johnny Bravo
- Whilce Portacio – created Bishop of the X-Men, co-founder of Image Comics
- Romeo Tanghal – comic book artist
- Leo Zulueta – tattoo artist
- Tony DeZuniga – co-creator of Jonah Hex

==== Visual art ====
- Terry Acebo Davis (born 1953) – first Filipino American to exhibit art at the Asian Art Museum of San Francisco's Samsung Hall
- Michael Janis (born 1959) – glass artist, a director of the Washington Glass School
- Manuel Ocampo (born 1965) – painter, fuses Baroque religious iconography with inspirations from punk subculture
- Alfonso Ossorio (1916–1990) – abstract expressionism artist
- Mail Order Brides/M.O.B. (founded 1995) – artist trio of Eliza Barrios, Reanne Estrada, and (see below) Jenifer Wofford
- Nelfa Querubin (born 1941) – ceramic artist
- Lordy Rodriguez (born 1976) – contemporary artist who uses cartography and maps
- Stephanie Syjuco (born 1974) – conceptual artist; assistant professor at University of California, Berkeley
- Joseph Santos (born 1965) – contemporary artist, watercolorist
- Leo Valledor (1936–1989) – painter who pioneered the Hard-edge painting style
- Carlos Villa (1936–2013) – visual artist, curator, professor at California State University, Sacramento and San Francisco Art Institute
- Jenifer K. Wofford – member of Mail Order Brides, curator, assistant professor at University of San Francisco and University of California, Berkeley

==== History ====
- Belinda Aquino – author, professor, women's and civil rights activist, founder of the Center for Philippine Studies at the University of Hawaiʻi at Mānoa
- Dorothy Cordova – activist, professor, co-founder of the Filipino American National Historical Society
- Fred Cordova – author, Filipinos: Forgotten Asian Americans; co-founder, Filipino American National Historical Society
- Dawn Mabalon – activist, author

==== Journalism ====
- Byron Acohido – 1997 Pulitzer Prize in Beat Reporting, Seattle Times
- Leah Borromeo – journalist and documentary filmmaker
- Natasha Brown – anchor, KYW in Philadelphia
- Cher Calvin – anchor, KTLA Channel 5 Los Angeles
- Katherine Creag – reporter, WNBC in New York City
- Ernabel Demillo – TV host
- Veronica De La Cruz – MSNBC news anchor
- Rovilson Fernandez – TV host, model, editor
- Emil Guillermo – journalist, writer, and broadcaster; first Filipino American to anchor a regularly scheduled national news program, NPR's All Things Considered, May 1989
- Cassidy Hubbarth – ESPN Anchor
- Noel Izon – documentary filmmaker
- Kristine Johnson – anchor, WCBS-TV New York
- Lloyd LaCuesta – television journalist, KTVU South Bay bureau chief
- David Lat – legal commentator and author, founder of Above the Law news website
- Pat Loika – Comic podcaster
- Elita Loresca – former NBC4 and current KTRK-TV Los Angeles weathercaster and meteorologist
- Michelle Malkin – commentator on FOX News, author
- Jean Martirez – anchor for KTTV Fox 11 in Los Angeles
- Cheryl Diaz Meyer – 2004 Pulitzer Prize winner
- Libertito Pelayo – publisher and editor-in-chief, Filipino Reporter
- Maria Quiban – meteorologist and news anchor, KTTV/KCOP-TV in Los Angeles
- Elaine Quijano – correspondent at CBS News, formerly with CNN
- Victoria Recaño – correspondent on such programs as The Insider and Inside Edition
- Maria Ressa – Nobel Peace Prize laureate, journalist, author and co-founder of Rappler
- Frances Rivera – journalist, television news anchor for WHDH Boston, WPIX New York and NBC News
- Anne Quito – architecture and design critic for Quartz
- Alex Tizon – 1997 Pulitzer Prize in Investigative Reporting, Seattle Times; author of Big Little Man: In Search of My Asian Self (2014)
- Corky Trinidad (1939–2009) – Honolulu Star Bulletin editorial cartoonist
- Jia Tolentino – essayist and staff writer for The New Yorker
- Pablo Torre – sportswriter and columnist for ESPN.com and ESPN The Magazine
- Jose Antonio Vargas – 2008 Pulitzer Prize Winner in Journalism for his work with the Washington Post; DREAM Act advocate; undocumented immigrant
- Mona Lisa Yuchengco – founder, Filipinas magazine

==== Law ====
- Simeon R. Acoba, Jr. – former Associate Justice, Hawaii State Supreme Court
- Kiwi Camara – attorney; youngest person to enter Harvard Law School
- Tani Cantil-Sakauye – Chief Justice of California
- George Conway – attorney, Founder of the Lincoln Project
- Noel Francisco – 47th Solicitor General of the United States
- Dale Ho (born 1977) – U.S. district judge of the U.S. District Court for the Southern District of New York
- Mario Ramil – former Associate Justice, Hawaii State Supreme Court
- Sean Reyes – Utah Attorney General

==== Literature ====
- Maria Amapola Cabase – author of the Royal Palm Literary Award winning novel Coming Home, singer, actress
- Peter Bacho – author of the American Book Award winning novel Cebu
- Cecilia Manguerra Brainard – author of When the Rainbow Goddess Wept
- Carlos Bulosan – author of America Is in the Heart
- Regie Cabico – Slam poet and performer
- Elaine Castillo – author, America Is Not the Heart
- Gilbert Luis R. Centina III – novelist and award-winning poet
- Melissa de la Cruz – author of teen lit series The Au Pairs, The Ashleys, and Blue Bloods
- Alex Gilvarry – author of From the Memoirs of a Non-Enemy Combatant and Eastman Was Here
- Vince Gotera – poet and editor of the North American Review
- Jessica Hagedorn – playwright and author, Dogeaters, The Gangster of Love, Dream Jungle
- Tess Uriza Holthe – author of When the Elephants Dance
- Ma. Luisa Aguilar Igloria – award-winning poet
- Erin Entrada Kelly – author of the Newbery Medal winning novel Hello, Universe
- R. Zamora Linmark – author of Rolling the R's
- Aimee Nezhukumatathil – award-winning poet and professor
- Barbara Jane Reyes – poet
- Al Robles – activist and poet, author of Rappin' With Ten Thousand Carabaos in the Dark
- Randy Romero – writer
- Eileen Tabios – poet
- Lysley Tenorio – author of Monstress
- Alex Tizon – author of Big Little Man: In Search of My Asian Self, Pulitzer Prize-winning journalist
- Jose Garcia Villa – poet, writer, generationalist; pre-Beat Generation influence

==== Theatre ====
- Joan Almedilla – Broadway actor (Miss Saigon, Les Misérables)
- Isa Briones - Broadway actor (Eurydice in Hadestown, Just In Time), and daughter of Jon Jon Briones
- Jon Jon Briones – Broadway, West End and television actor (Miss Saigon, The Assassination of Gianni Versace: American Crime Story, American Horror Story: Apocalypse), and father of Isa Briones
- Laurie Cadevida – Broadway actress (Miss Saigon, Aida, The Pajama Game)
- Ali Ewoldt – Broadway actress, first woman of color to play lead role of Christine Daaé in The Phantom of the Opera on Broadway
- Van Ferro – BroadwayWorld award-winning actor from Chicago
- Arielle Jacobs – Broadway actor and singer (In The Heights, Aladdin, Here Lies Love)
- Jose Llana – Broadway actor, Drama Desk Award winner
- Robert Lopez – composer, Tony Award winner, writer of "Let It Go" from the movie Frozen
- Deedee Magno Hall – cast member, national touring and San Francisco cast of Wicked
- Paolo Montalban – Broadway and television actor
- Eva Noblezada – Broadway and West End actress (Kim in Miss Saigon, Éponine in Les Misérables, originated Eurydice in Hadestown
- Ralph Peña – founding member and artistic director, Ma-Yi Theater Company
- Jasmine Rafael – Broadway performer (originated the role of Imogen in & Juliet on Broadway)
- Conrad Ricamora – Broadway singer and actor (The King and I, Here Lies Love, Off-Broadway Revival of Little Shop of Horrors)
- George Salazar – Broadway actor (Godspell, Be More Chill)
- Lea Salonga – Broadway and West End actress; Tony, Olivier, Drama Desk, and OCC Award winner

=== Business ===
- Diosdado Banatao – Silicon Valley engineer and businessman
- Caterina Fake – half-Filipino co-founder of Flickr and Hunch
- Bobby Murphy – co-founder of Snapchat
- Josie Natori – founder of The Natori Company
- Loida Nicolas-Lewis – chairman and CEO of TLC Beatrice International Holdings, Inc.
- Peter Valdes – co-founder of Tivoli Systems Inc.
- Sheila Lirio Marcelo – entrepreneur and founder of Care.com
- DJ Rose – full name Roslynn Alba Cobarrubias, founder of mydiveo, helped launch Myspace
- Jennifer Rubio – co-founder and President of Away
- Jeremiah Abraham – founder and CEO of Tremendous Communications, advocate for Asian and Asian American visibility in Hollywood

=== Culinary arts ===
- Amy Besa and Romy Dorotan – activists and co-owners of Filipino restaurant Purple Yam in Brooklyn, New York, 2014 IACP Jane Grigson Award winners for their book Memories of Philippine Kitchens
- Alvin Cailan – chef and host of First We Feast's The Burger Show
- Cristeta Comerford – first woman executive chef at the White House
- Tom Cunanan – James Beard Award-winning chef of Filipino restaurant Bad Saint in Washington, D.C.
- Carlo Lamagna – chef and owner of Magna's Kusina, one of the Food & Wine Best New Chefs of 2021
- Melissa Miranda – James Beard Award semifinalist chef of Filipino restaurant Musang in Seattle
- Paul Qui – James Beard Award-winning chef and winner of Top Chef: Texas
- Dale Talde – Top Chef: Chicago and Top Chef: All Stars contestant and owner of the restaurant Talde in Brooklyn, New York

=== Education ===
- Flora Arca Mata – first Filipino American Teacher in California
- Kristoffer Toribio – first Filipino American President of the International Association for College Admission Counseling.
- Astrid S. Tuminez – first female president of Utah Valley University

=== Fashion and pageantry ===
==== Fashion ====
- Anna Bayle - Fashion Model, First Asian woman to achieve supermodel status
- Monique Lhuillier – Hollywood fashion designer
- Kelsey Merritt – fashion model, first Filipino woman to ever walk in the Victoria's Secret Fashion Show
- Josie Natori – Hollywood fashion designer
- Geena Rocero – transgender fashion model and activist, founder of the Gender Proud organization
- Leeann Tweeden – model, television personality

==== Pageants ====
- Ki'ilani Arruda – Miss Teen USA 2020
- Sonya Balmores – Miss Hawaii Teen USA 2004
- Angela Perez Baraquio – Miss America 2001
- Ginger Conejero – Miss Philippines-Air 2006, television host/reporter
- Katrina Dimaranan – Miss Supranational 2018 1st Runner Up, Miss Universe Philippines Tourism 2021, model, actress, and television personality
- Alice Dixson – Binibining Pilipinas-International 1986, actress and model
- Laura Dunlap – Miss Philippines Earth 2003
- R'Bonney Gabriel – Fashion designer, model crowned Miss Texas USA 2022, Miss USA 2022, first Filipino-American Miss USA, and Miss Universe 2022
- Chelsea Hardin – Miss Hawaii USA 2016 and Miss USA 2016 First Runner-Up
- Jamie Herrell – Miss Earth 2014 and Miss Philippines Earth 2014
- Kristina Janolo – Miss Florida 2011
- Krista Kleiner – Binibining Pilipinas-International 2010, actress, martial artist, singer, dancer and composer
- Kimberly "Kim" Layne – Miss Idaho USA 2020 and Miss USA 2020 First Runner-Up
- Audra Mari – Miss North Dakota Teen USA 2011, Miss Teen USA 2011 First Runner-Up, Miss North Dakota USA 2014, Miss USA 2014 First Runner-Up, Miss World America 2016, Miss World 2016 Top 11 Finalist
- Christi McGarry – Binibining Pilipinas-Intercontinental 2015
- Vanessa Minnillo – Miss Teen USA 1998, actress and television host
- Maureen Montagne – The Miss Globe 2021, Miss Arizona USA 2015 and model
- Jenny Ramp – Miss Philippines Earth 2022
- Katarina Rodriguez – Miss World Philippines 2018, model, athlete
- Patricia Tumulak – Miss Philippines-Fire 2009
- Robyn Watkins – Miss Oklahoma USA 2006
- Megan Young – Miss World 2013, Miss World Philippines 2013, actress, model, television host and VJ

=== Health science ===
- Fe del Mundo, MD – first Asian and female student at Harvard Medical School
- Kevin Nadal, Ph.D. – Associate Professor of Psychology, John Jay College of Criminal Justice, New York City; author, Filipino American Psychology: A Handbook of Theory, Research, and Clinical Practice
- Maria P. P. Root – psychologist
- Mariano Yogore (1921–2006) – Professor and Head of Institute of Public Health

=== Labor ===
- Larry Itliong – Co-founder of the Agricultural Workers Organizing Committee, assistant director of the United Farm Workers, co-leader of the Delano grape strike
- Philip Vera Cruz – Co-founder, Agricultural Workers Organizing Committee, which later became the United Farm Workers; Vice-president, United Farm Workers

=== Military ===
- Antonio A. Aguto Jr. –Major General, U.S. Army, Commanding General of First Army
- Babette Bolivar – Rear Admiral (Lower Half), U.S. Navy; Women Divers Hall of Fame inductee
- Raquel C. Bono – Rear Admiral (Lower Half), U.S. Navy; Command Surgeon, United States Pacific Command
- Brian Bulatao – Captain, U.S. Army, 75th Ranger Regiment; CIA Chief Operations Officer; Under Secretary of State for Management
- Jose Calugas – Captain, U.S. Army; Medal of Honor recipient, World War II
- Cary C. Chun – Brigadier General, U.S. Air Force, first U.S. Air Force General Officer of Filipino descent; Commander, 50th Space Wing, Schriever Air Force Base
- Anatolio B. Cruz – Rear Admiral (Lower Half), U.S. Navy. Former Deputy Commander, United States Fourth Fleet
- Rudolph Davila – First Lieutenant, U.S. Army. Medal of Honor recipient, World War II
- Leonard Dollaga – Rear Admiral, U.S. Navy, Commander, Submarine Group 7 and Commander, Task Force 74 and Task Force 54
- Florence Finch – Seaman second class, U.S. Coast Guard; Medal of Freedom recipient for actions during the occupation of the Philippine Islands in World War II
- Oscar Hilman – Brigadier General, U.S. Army; Commanding General of 81st Stryker Brigade Combat Team
- Eleanor Mariano – Rear Admiral (Lower Half), U.S. Navy, first Filipino American to be promoted to a flag officer rank; former White House physician
- Victorino Mercado – Rear Admiral (Lower Half), U.S. Navy; Director of Maritime Operations of U.S. Pacific Fleet; Assistant Secretary of Defense for Strategy, Plans and Capabilities; first Filipino American Surface Warfare Officer to achieve flag rank
- José B. Nísperos – Private, U.S. Army, first Asian Medal of Honor recipient
- Ronald Ravelo – Captain, U.S. Navy, first Filipino American commander of an aircraft carrier (USS Abraham Lincoln)
- Eldon Regua – Major General, U.S. Army Reserve; Commanding General, 75th Division (BCTD)
- Edward Soriano – Lieutenant General, U.S. Army, commanding General of I Corps
- Ramon S. Subejano – Private First Class, U.S. Army, Silver Star recipient, World War II
- Benigno G. Tabora – Sergeant Major, U.S. Army, Purple Heart recipient, World War II
- Antonio Taguba – Major General, U.S. Army, principal author of the US Army 15-6 Report of Abuse of Prisoners in Iraq
- Telesforo Trinidad – Fireman Second Class, U.S. Navy, only Asian American Naval Recipient of the Medal of Honor
- Eleanor Valentin – Rear Admiral (Lower Half), Medical Corps, U.S. Navy, Commander, Naval Medical Support

=== Politics ===
- Peter Aduja – State Legislature, Hawaii; first Filipino American elected in the United States
- Dennis Apuan – former member of the Colorado House of Representatives
- Larry Asera – First Filipino American elected to a city council in the continental United States (1973)
- Steve Austria – Former Republican congressman from Beavercreek, Ohio
- Rob Bonta – First Filipino American California State Legislator, first Filipino American Attorney General of California
- Thelma Buchholdt – First female Filipino American state legislator (1974); first Asian American to be elected President of the National Order of Women Legislators (1987)
- Brian Bulatao – Former CIA Chief Operations Officer, former Under Secretary of State for Management
- Christopher Cabaldon – Mayor of West Sacramento, California, born in 1965
- Romeo Munoz Cachola – former member of the Hawaii House of Representatives
- Jessica Caloza – first Filipina member of the California State Assembly
- Benjamin J. Cayetano – First Filipino American governor in the U.S., for the state of Hawaii
- Vicky Cayetano – Former First Lady of Hawaii
- TJ Cox – Former U.S. House of Representatives of California, his mother is Filipino
- John Ensign – Former U.S. Senator and U.S. Representative from Nevada; his great-grandmother is from the Philippines
- Jose Esteves – Former Mayor of Milpitas, California
- Tony Fulton – member of Nebraska State Legislature
- Sonny Ganaden – member of the Hawaii House of Representatives
- Mike Guingona – Council Member and Former Mayor of Daly City, California
- Greggor Ilagan – member of the Hawaii House of Representatives
- Lorraine Rodero Inouye – Hawaii state senator, former Mayor of Hawaii County and the first Filipino-American woman to serve as mayor of a U.S. County
- Ysabel Jurado – member of the Los Angeles City Council
- Donna Mercado Kim – Hawaii state senator, former President of the Hawaii Senate
- Trish La Chica – Filipino American State Legislator, Hawaii, 2023.
- Rolando Lavarro, Jr. – Jersey City council president, elected to city council in 2011.
- Marvin Lim, member of the Georgia House of Representatives
- Joey Manahan – former member of the Honolulu City Council, Vice Speaker of the Hawaii House of Representatives
- John W. Marshall, Virginia Secretary of Public Safety and Director of the U.S. Marshals Service, his mother is of Filipino descent
- Thurgood Marshall, Jr. – White House senior staff member during the Clinton Administration, his mother is of Filipino descent
- Rose Martinez – Filipino American State Legislator, Hawaii, 2022.
- Benjamin Menor – Filipino American State Legislator and Judge, Hawaii, 1962
- Jeff Moneda – City Manager of Foster City, California.
- Gonzalo Monte-Manibog - City councilmember and mayor of Monterey Park, California.
- Mona Pasquil – in November 2009, became the first woman to serve as acting lieutenant governor of California
- David Pendleton – former Minority Floor Leader, Hawaii House of Representatives
- Sean David Reyes – Utah Attorney General and first ethnic minority elected to state office in Utah; father is Filipino, father's first cousin was 7th President of the Philippines, Ramon Magsaysay
- Joy San Buenaventura – Member of the Hawaii Senate and former member of Hawaii House of Representatives
- Apolinar Sangalang - Mayor of Lathrop, California
- Bobby Scott – U.S. Representative from Virginia, maternal grandfather is Filipino
- Michele J. Sison – Assistant Secretary of State for International Organization Affairs
- Peter J. Urscheler – Mayor of Phoenixville, Pennsylvania, and a first-generation Filipino American honored among the Ten Outstanding Young Americans by JCI USA in 2019.
- Kris Valderrama – Member of the Maryland House of Delegates, representing the 26th District
- Ron Villanueva – Member of the Virginia House of Delegates, representing the 21st District; former member of the Coast Guard Reserves

=== Religion ===
- Alejandro D. Aclan – Auxiliary bishop of Los Angeles
- Rey Bersabal – Auxiliary bishop of Sacramento
- Anthony Celino – Auxiliary bishop of El Paso
- Efren V. Esmilla – Auxiliary bishop of Philadelphia
- Ruben Habito, Filipino Zen Master of the Sanbō Kyōdan lineage and founder of Maria Kannon Zen Center in Dallas, Texas
- Andres Cantoria Ligot – Auxiliary bishop of San Jose
- Oscar A. Solis – First Filipino American Catholic bishop and first to head a diocese, 10th Bishop of Salt Lake City
- Bruce Reyes-Chow – The first Filipino American head of a major denomination in the US, as Moderator of the Presbyterian Church (U.S.A.) (2008–2010)

=== Sports ===
- Jimmy Alapag – former PBA player and assistant coach for Stockton Kings
- Doug Baldwin (Filipina grandmother) – former NFL player, Super Bowl champion
- Tedy Bruschi – former NFL player, three-time Super Bowl champion
- Camryn Bynum - NFL safety for the Indianapolis Colts
- Jordan Clarkson – NBA player
- Kihei Clark – College basketball player
- Boogie Ellis – basketball player
- Roman Gabriel – former NFL quarterback, MVP
- Jalen Green – basketball player
- Vince Hizon – former professional basketball player of PBA
- Andrei Iosivas - NFL wide receiver for the Cincinnati Bengals
- Tim Lincecum – former MLB pitcher, World Series champion, Cy Young Award winner
- Mike Magpayo – NCAA basketball head coach
- Jared McCain – NBA player
- Jason Myers – American professional football placekicker for the Seattle Seahawks
- Jason Robertson – NHL player for the Dallas Stars
- Nicholas Robertson – NHL player for the Toronto Maple Leafs
- Raymond Sarmiento – tennis player
- Erik Spoelstra – NBA head coach
- Anthony Volpe – MLB player for New York Yankees

=== Television and film ===
- Ruthie Alcaide – MTV The Real World: Hawaii cast
- Benjamin Alves – actor
- Kaye Abad – actress
- Craig Abaya – film producer/director, musician, educator, and photographer
- Neile Adams – actress
- Gerald Anderson – actor, model
- Nicole Gale Anderson – actress (Jonas and Beauty & the Beast)
- Siena Agudong – actress (Star Falls, Alex & Me and No Good Nick)
- Ruben Aquino – Disney animator (The Lion King and The Little Mermaid)
- Ashley Argota – actress, singer, musician (True Jackson VP, Bucket & Skinner's Epic Adventures, The Fosters, How to Build a Better Boy)
- Cecilio Asuncion – director, host, producer, filmmaker, and executive
- Jon Jon Augustavo – award-winning filmmaker and music video director (Macklemore's "Thrift Shop", "Can't Hold Us", "Same Love")
- Alley Baggett – model, actress
- Brandon Baker – actor (Johnny Tsunami and Johnny Kapahala: Back on Board)
- Kimee Balmilero – member of the American version of Hi-5, a children's musical group
- Roxanne Barcelo – actress, model, singer
- Dante Basco – actor, dancer, rapper, poet
- Dion Basco – actor
- Ella Jay Basco – actress (Birds of Prey)
- Jacob Batalon – actor
- Dave Bautista – mixed martial artist, wrestler, actor (Guardians of the Galaxy, My Spy)
- Eric Bauza (born 1979) – Canadian-born actor (The Fairly OddParents, El Tigre: The Adventures of Manny Rivera)
- Paris Berelc – actress (Mighty Med, Lab Rats: Elite Force)
- Joy Bisco – actress
- Leann Bowen – writer
- Jameson Blake – actor, dancer and television personality
- Nida Blanca - actress
- Eileen Boylan – actress (South of Nowhere, General Hospital)
- Isa Briones – actress (Dr. Trinity Santos in The Pitt, Star Trek: Picard, Goosebumps), father is Filipino stage actor Jon Jon Briones
- Q. Allan Brocka – director (Eating Out and its sequel), producer, actor
- Cher Calvin – actress, news anchor (KTLA Morning News), Miss New York first runner up
- Louie del Carmen – story artist, DreamWorks Animation; storyboard artist (Kim Possible, Invader Zim, Rugrats)
- Ronnie del Carmen – story supervisor, Finding Nemo; storyboard artist, Batman: The Animated Series
- T.V. Carpio – actress
- Tia Carrere – actress (Relic Hunter, Wayne's World, Wayne's World 2) and singer
- Phoebe Cates – actress
- Christina Chang – actress (24, CSI: Miami, Private Practice)
- Pia Clemente – first Filipino to be nominated for a competitive Academy Award (for Our Time Is Up (2004))
- Emy Coligado – actress (Malcolm in the Middle)
- Max Collins – actress and model
- Michael Copon – actor (Power Rangers Time Force, Bring It On: In It to Win It)
- Eugene Cordero – actor
- Rik Cordero – director
- Billy Crawford - actor, dancer TV host and singer
- Darren Criss – actor/singer (Glee, The Assassination of Gianni Versace: American Crime Story), mother is an immigrant from the Philippines
- Christina Cuenca – Miss Louisiana USA 2006; actress
- Jake Cuenca – actor and soccer player
- Mark Dacascos – actor and martial arts expert
- Charles Michael Davis – actor and model
- Marpessa Dawn – actress
- Steffiana De La Cruz – actress and model
- Billy Dec – Emmy Award-winning actor/producer (Criminal Minds, Empire)
- Dean Devlin – screenwriter and producer (Independence Day, Godzilla, Stargate), also occasional actor
- Ivan Dorschner – actor, model and former Pinoy Big Brother: Teen Clash of 2010 5TH big placer
- Tippy Dos Santos – singer, actress
- Kyle Echarri – singer-songwriter, The Voice Kids
- Andi Eigenmann – actress
- Mar Elepano – filmmaker, production supervisor of the John C. Hench Lab, Division of Animation and Digital Arts, USC School of Cinematic Arts
- Tommy Esguerra – actor, model and former Pinoy Big Brother 737 2015 2nd big placer
- Matt Evans – actor
- Ava Fabian – actress, model
- Roshon Fegan – actor (Shake It Up)
- Von Flores – actor
- Joel de la Fuente – actor
- Karen Gaviola – television producer and director (Magnum P.I., Hawaii Five-0)
- Charles Gemora – Hollywood makeup artist
- Baron Geisler – actor, businessman, model, resource speaker, amateur artist and aspiring poet
- Raymond Gutierrez – actor and model, gay twin brother of Richard Gutierrez
- Richard Gutierrez – actor and model
- Deedee Magno Hall – actress and singer
- Melissa Howard – actress-comedienne, MTV Real World New Orleans cast
- Vanessa Hudgens – half-Filipino actress, singer, dancer and television star (High School Musical)
- Dan Inosanto – actor, martial arts instructor who is best known as a training partner of Bruce Lee
- Diana Lee Inosanto – actress, stuntwoman, film director (The Sensei)
- Cris Judd – actor, dancer, choreographer, former husband of Jennifer Lopez, lead dancer for Michael Jackson
- Tessa Keller, model and reality television personality
- Abigail Kintanar – actress, host
- Jo Koy – stand-up comedian
- Jennie Kwan – actress (California Dreams)
- Tony Labrusca – actor, model and singer
- Boom Labrusca – actor, model
- Lalaine – television actor (Lizzie McGuire).
- Liza Lapira – actress (Crazy, Stupid, Love, 21, Fast & Furious)
- Kris Lawrence – singer
- Sharon Leal – half-Filipino, half-African American actress (Boston Public, Dreamgirls)
- Reggie Lee – actor
- Matthew Libatique – cinematographer (Requiem for a Dream, Inside Man)
- Xian Lim – actor and model
- Tiffany Limos – actress
- BarBara Luna – actress
- Manila Luzon – drag queen, recording artist, comedian, and reality television personality (RuPaul's Drag Race and RuPaul's Drag Race All Stars)
- Tara Macken – actress
- Camille Mana – actress (One on One)
- Edu Manzano – actor and politician
- Luis Manzano – model and television host
- Alec Mapa – actor and comedian (Half & Half)
- Jessica Marasigan – actress, model, beauty queen and former Pinoy Big Brother 737 2015 housemate
- Anna Maria Perez de Taglé – actress (Hannah Montana, Camp Rock)
- Ayra Mariano – actress and model
- Marie Matiko – actress (The Art of War)
- Caitlin McHugh – actress and model (The Vampire Diaries)
- Chad McQueen – actor, producer, martial artist, race car driver (The Karate Kid, The Karate Kid Part II)
- Steven R. McQueen – actor (The Vampire Diaries)
- H.P. Mendoza – filmmaker, musician
- Sam Milby – actor, model
- Cymphonique Miller – singer and actress (How to Rock)
- Vanessa Minnillo – MTV VJ and former Miss Teen USA
- Jewel Mische – actress and model
- Derrick Monasterio – actor, singer and dancer
- Paolo Montalban – actor (Mortal Kombat: Conquest), model
- Troy Montero – actor
- Sofia Moran – actress (Women in Cages, Planet Terror), singer/recording artist
- Rex Navarrete – comedian, voice actor in Myx channel's cartoon The Nutshack
- Bert Nievera – singer and businessman
- Martin Nievera – singer, host and songwriter
- Robin Nievera – singer-songwriter and record producer.
- True O'Brien – actress (Days of Our Lives)
- Jazz Ocampo – actress and commercial model
- Raymond Ochoa – actor
- Belinda Panelo – MTV VJ
- Angelica Panganiban – actress and comedienne
- Van Partible – creator/director/writer of cartoon series Johnny Bravo
- Jennifer Paz – actress, voice of Lapis Lazuli (Steven Universe)
- Nia Peeples – actress and singer
- Lou Diamond Phillips – actor
- Charee Pineda – actress and politician
- Stef Prescott – actress and model
- Malia Pyles – actress (Pretty Little Liars: Original Sin)
- Jay R – R&B singer
- Shelby Rabara – actress (voice of Peridot in Steven Universe), dancer
- Sue Ramirez – Filipino actress, whose father is an American citizen
- Victoria Recaño – correspondent (The Insider), actress (CSI: Miami)
- Sheryn Regis – singer, actress
- Ernie Reyes Jr. – actor, martial artist
- Ernie Reyes Sr. – actor, martial artist, fight choreographer
- Conrad Ricamora – singer and actor (How to Get Away with Murder)
- Jackie Rice – actress
- Alden Richards (Richard Faulkerson) – actor, singer
- Ronnie Ricketts - actor, scriptwriter, film director, line producer, and martial artist
- Melissa Ricks – actress
- Tom Rodriguez – actor and former Pinoy Big Brother: Double Up housemate
- Jelynn Rodriguez – actress
- Vincent Rodriguez III – actor (Crazy Ex-Girlfriend)
- Jason Rogel – actor (Splinterheads, The Great State of Georgia)
- Donita Rose – actress
- Lea Salonga - singer and actress
- Tura Satana – actress (Faster, Pussycat! Kill! Kill!), father was a silent movie actor of Japanese and Filipino descent
- Rob Schneider – Saturday Night Live performer, actor, comedian
- Nicole Scherzinger – singer, actress
- Steven Silva – actor, model
- Pepe Smith — late rock star
- Liza Soberano – actress, model
- Paul Soriano – film director and producer
- Shannyn Sossamon – actress (40 Days and 40 Nights, A Knight's Tale)
- Hailee Steinfeld – actress, singer (Pitch Perfect 2, Barely Lethal)
- George Sunga – TV Producer and Writer, Three's Company, The Jeffersons
- Jon Timmons – actor, model, television personality
- Chuti Tiu – actress (Desire, 24)
- G. Toengi – actress, singer
- Whitney Tyson – actress and comedienne
- Michelle Vergara Moore – actress (Condor, The Unusual Suspects)
- Jade Villalon – actress, singer-songwriter
- Jillian Ward – actress, singer and model
- Marsha Garces Williams – film producer, mother of Zelda Williams, Filipino father
- Zelda Williams – actress, Filipino grandfather, daughter of Robin Williams and Marsha Garces Williams
- Lo Mutuc – actress (Knocked Up, Paper Heart)
- Megan Young – actress, beauty queen, crowned as Miss World 2013, sister of Lauren Young
- Lauren Young – actress, sister of Megan Young

==== Reality show ====
- Leah Cohen – contestant on Top Chef (Season 5)
- Angelica Hale – contestant on America's Got Talent (season 12)
- Charmaine Hunt – contestant on The Apprentice season 5
- Melody Lacayanga – So You Think You Can Dance contestant (Season 1 runner-up).
- Ongina – drag queen, contestant on RuPaul's Drag Race (Season 1), former contestant in RuPaul's Drag Race All Stars (Seasons 5), and spokesperson for MAC Cosmetics
- Manila Luzon – drag performer and runner-up on RuPaul's Drag Race (Season 3), former contestant in RuPaul's Drag Race All Stars (Seasons 1 and 4).
- Jiggly Caliente – drag performer, contestant on RuPaul's Drag Race (Season 4), former contestant in RuPaul's Drag Race All Stars (Seasons 6), and judge on Drag Race Philippines (Season 1).
- Sandra McCoy – actress, former contestant in Pussycat Dolls Present: The Search for the Next Doll.
- Asia Nitollano – Pussycat Dolls Present: The Search for the Next Doll winner; daughter of Joe Bataan.
- Ellona Santiago – FOX The X Factor U.S. finalist (Season 3).
- Josie Smith-Malave – contestant on the show Top Chef contestant (Season 2).
- Greggy Soriano – cast as "Greggy" Cake Boss: Next Great Baker on TLC and "Greggy, the Self Proclaimed 'Gaysian'" Beauty and the Geek contestant (Season 5) on The CW Network.
- Amy Vachal – NBC The Voice U.S. finalist (Season 9).

==== Internet ====
- Wil Dasovich – television personality, commercial model, celebrity endorser and famous YouTube vlogger. He won the Shorty Awards for Vlogger of the Year.
- Christine Gambito – American Internet personality, actress, and comedian; maintains one of the most-subscribed-to channels on YouTube; also appointed Ambassador of Philippine tourism
- Guava Juice - Filipino-American YouTuber, content creator, writer, and actor known for challenge vlogs, DIYs, experiments, and founding channel Wassabi Productions
- Anthony Padilla – famous YouTube celebrity; he is one half of the comedy duo Smosh and is one of the most subscribed YouTubers on YouTube
- Bretman Rock – US-based Filipino internet personality and beauty influencer; he stars in his own reality TV show on MTV
- Michael Reeves – A tech and comedy YouTuber currently streaming under the American media collective known as OfflineTV.
- Sneako - American videographer, political commentator and social media personality.
- Valkyrae – YouTube streamer and co-owner of lifestyle and gaming org 100 Thieves. One of the most-watched female streamers.
- Alex Burriss - (known online as Alex Wassabi) Filipino-American YouTuber, content creator, writer, and actor known for challenge vlogs, DIYs, experiments, and founding channel Wassabi Productions

=== Music ===
==== Disc jockeys ====
- DJ Babu (Chris Oroc) – disc jockey of the World Famous Beat Junkies and member of the hip hop group Dilated Peoples. Hails from Oxnard, California.
- DJ Bonics – disc jockey of rapper Wiz Khalifa
- Mix Master Mike (Michael Schwartz) – Beastie Boys disc jockey, founding member of the Invisibl Skratch Piklz; winner of 1992 and 1993 DMC World DJ Championships (Rocksteady DJ's) and winner of the 1992 New Music Seminar/Supermen Inc. DJ Battle for World Supremacy. Appears in the documentary film Scratch.
- DJ Qbert (Richard Quitevis) – San Francisco Bay Area hip-hop disc jockey and pioneering turntablist. Founding member of the Invisibl Skratch Piklz; winner of 1991 (solo) 1992 (Rocksteady DJ's), 1993, (Dreamteam) DMC World DJ Championships. Featured in the movie Hang the DJ. Appears in the documentary films Modulations and Scratch. Created animated pop film Wave Twisters
- DJ Riddler (Rich Pangilinan) – disc jockey at WKTU in New York, Sirius Satellite Radio, record producer, remixer and member of the group MYNT
- DJ Virman (Virman Coquia) of the group Far East Movement

==== Rock music ====
- Craig Abaya – award-winning songwriter, singer, musician, recording artist and producer
- Noah Bernardo – drummer – P.O.D.
- Melina Duterte – musician better known by her stage name Jay Som
- Jerome Fontamillas – Switchfoot guitarist and keyboardist
- Lowell George – songwriter, singer and slide guitarist of the rock band Little Feat
- Christopher Guanlao – drummer/songwriter for Silversun Pickups
- Kirk Hammett – lead guitarist for Metallica (Filipina mother)
- Haley Heynderickx – singer-songwriter from Portland, Oregon
- Anthony Improgo – drummer of the Band Metro Station
- Mike Inez – bassist of Alice in Chains
- Dan Layus – lead singer, guitarist of the band Augustana
- Jared Palomar – bassist, and pianist of the band Augustana
- Arnel Pineda – vocalist of the band Journey
- Joey Santiago – lead guitarist of the Pixies, credited by Kurt Cobain as influential to his music, albums include the classic Surfer Rosa and Doolittle. Later formed a band "The Martinis" with his wife
- Matthew Santos – rock and folk singer-songwriter, musician and painter, father of part-Filipino descent

==== Pop music ====
- Leah Dizon – model, singer, actress, and TV personality in Japan
- Enrique Iglesias – half-Filipino, half-Spanish pop music singer-songwriter
- Bruno Mars – half-Filipino, quarter-Puerto Rican, Hungarian-Ukrainian Jewish, singer
- Olivia Rodrigo – half-Filipina, quarter Irish and German, singer-songwriter, actress
- Sophia Laforteza – singer, dancer, and member of girl group Katseye
- Maile Misajon – singer of Eden's Crush
- Bella Poarch – singer, TikTok star
- Larry Ramos – guitarist, banjo player, and vocalist with the American pop band the Association and the New Christy Minstrels.
- Nicole Scherzinger – lead singer for the Pussycat Dolls. (Filipino father, Hawaiian/Russian mother, birth name was Nicole Valiente)
- Jasmine V – singer
- Jocelyn Enriquez – singer, 90's pop diva, Christian vocalist
- J. Rey Soul - singer, vocalist of the band Black Eyed Peas
- beabadoobee – Filipina-British singer-songwriter Beatrice Kristi Ilejay Laus

==== American Idol Contestants ====
- Reynaldo Lapuz – American Idol contestant (Season 7).
- Guji Lorenzana – alternative rock, pop rock solo artist, American Idol contestant (Season 3).
- Ramiele Malubay – American Idol contestant (Season 7).
- Thia Megia – American Idol contestant (Season 10).
- Jessica Sanchez – American Idol contestant; Father is Mexican, Mother is Filipina (Season 11), finished as the Runner-Up.
- Jasmine Trias – American Idol contestant (Season 3), finished in 3rd place.
- Camile Velasco – American Idol contestant (Season 3), finished in 9th place.
- Malaya Watson – American Idol contestant (Season 13), finished in 8th place.

==== Rap, hip hop ====
- DJ Qbert – turntablist, composer, producer
- Apl.de.ap - rapper, member of Black Eyed Peas
- Danny Brown – rapper who is half African American and half Filipino.
- Guapdad 4000 – rapper of African-American and Filipino descent
- Chad Hugo – music producer and musician; one-half of The Neptunes.
- Ruby Ibarra – rapper, music producer, and spoken word artist
- Allan Pineda Lindo – known as apl.de.ap. Member of the Grammy Award-winning hip-hop group The Black Eyed Peas
- Maliibu Miitch – rapper of African-American, Vietnamese and Filipino descent
- Travis McCoy – Gym Class Heroes singer; Haitian/Italian/Irish/Filipino/Native American
- Saweetie – rapper who is half African-American and half Filipino-Chinese
- Cassie Ventura – known as Cassie (born August 26, 1986, in New London, Connecticut), R&B and pop singer, model, and actress.
- Dominic Fike – rapper who is half African American and half Filipino.
- Antwon – rapper of mixed African American and Filipino descent
- Dok2 - Korean Filipino rapper

==== Music producers ====
- Chazwick Bradley Bundick – American recording artist and producer also known as Toro y Moi
- Illmind – hip hop producer
- Irv Gotti - Hip-Hop Producer (of African American and Filipino descent)
- Arian Leviste – electronic music artist, record producer and disc jockey
- Cha Cha Malone – music producer
- Shawn Wasabi – record producer

==== R&B ====
- Sugar Pie DeSanto – born as Umpeylia Marsema Balinton, Filipino-American rhythm and blues singer of the 1950s and 1960s
- Billy Crawford – R&B, pop and soul singer
- Asia Cruise (Filipina mother) - R&B singer
- H.E.R. (Filipino mother) – R&B
- Adrian Marcel – R&B singer, songwriter, and rapper from Oakland, California. Who is half African American and half Filipino

==== Jazz ====
- Bobby Enriquez – "The Wild Man", prodigious pianist
- Bob Parlocha – saxophonist and longtime host of a syndicated nightly jazz radio program
- Danny Barcelona – jazz drummer, part of Louis Armstrong's All-Stars from 1958 onward

==== International world music ====
- Joe Bataan – Latin soul legend

==== Classical music ====
- Manuel Kabajar Cabase – composer, arranger, conductor, multi-instrumentalist, movie musical director, Halad Museum Inductee
- Evelyn Mandac – soprano opera singer and winner of the Metropolitan Opera Auditions.
- Eugene F. Castillo – conductor, born in Hollywood, CA, is now the music director of the Philippine Philharmonic Orchestra, Cultural Center of the Philippines

==== Composers ====
- Craig Abaya – award-winning songwriter, singer, musician. Collaborator with JoAnne Lorenzana (1st cousin) and DJ Qbert. Same person as the filmmaker and photographer.
- Nilo Alcala – the first Filipino-American composer recipient of the prestigious Copland House Residency Award.
- Robert Lopez – composer, first Filipino American Oscar recipient; recipient of a Grammy Award, Emmy Award and a Tony Award; twelfth individual to achieve an EGOT

==== Other / miscellaneous genres ====
- Amapola Cabase – singer, actor, producer, TV Host of "Amapola Presents Show" KEMO-TV (now KOFY) San Francisco, California
- Kriesha Chu – K-Pop singer based in South Korea
- Frankie Cosmos – singer-songwriter
- Kate Earl – singer-songwriter
- Jocelyn Enriquez – techno and house singer of "Do You Miss Me?"
- Carlo Gimenez – lead guitarist for Dia Frampton
- Billy Hinsche – lead guitarist for Dino, Desi & Billy
- Steve Lacy – American musician, singer-songwriter, and record producer. Member of music group: The Internet.
- Rachael Lampa – Christian singer
- Gerard Damien Long – known as Hodgy Beats; member of the hip-hop collective OFWGKTA and the duo MellowHype, rapper and producer.
- Neal McCoy – country music singer.
- Sophia Montecarlo – singer, model, a "Born Diva", grand finalist
- Jaya Ramsey – freestyle artist
- Ana Roxanne – experimental musician and singer
- underscores – April Harper Grey, experimental and pop musician

==== Musical groups ====
- One Vo1ce – All-Filipina girl R&B/OPM singing group from the San Francisco Bay Area
- Blue Scholars – Geo aka. Prometheus Brown, MC of the duo, is Filipino-American
- Death Angel – thrash metal band
- Kai – San Francisco Bay Area boy band
- Moonpools & Caterpillars – Filipino American rock band based in California in the 1990s
- My American Heart – rock band
- The Rocky Fellers – group was composed of four Filipino brothers and their father. Their hit song: "Killer Joe" reached No. 16 on the Billboard Hot 100 in April 1963.
- Legaci – Filipino-American R&B band from the San Francisco Bay Area, California, formed in 1997. They were the backup singers for Canadian Pop-R&B singer Justin Bieber on the My World Tour.
- Q-York – Filipino-American hip hop record production duo composed of Flava Matikz (DJ/producer) and Knowa Lazarus (songwriter/MC).

=== Other ===
- Leandro Aragoncillo – former FBI intelligence analyst and retired Gunnery Sergeant in the United States Marine Corps who was charged with espionage and leaking classified information against President Gloria Macapagal Arroyo.
- Thomas Beatie – Filipino father, female-to-male transgender man who is legally male and married as a male. Beatie had chest reconstruction and testosterone therapy but kept his female reproductive organs intact. He is notable for having had had several pregnancies since becoming physically male.
- Helen Agcaoili Summers Brown (1915-2011), also known as Auntie Helen, a teacher, librarian, and founder of the Pilipino American Reading Room and Library. She was born in Manila to a Filipino mother and an Anglo father, and moved to America after her graduation from Manila Central High School.
- Andrew Cunanan – half-Italian, half-Filipino American gay alleged spree killer during the mid-1990s; allegedly murdered several of his lovers, including the Italian fashion designer Gianni Versace. Father was a retired United States Navy from the Philippines.
- Ralph Deleon – convicted of conspiracy to support terrorism.
- Pearlasia Gamboa – controversial business woman successfully sued by the United States Securities and Exchange Commission
- Asia Jackson – American actress, YouTuber, and activist
- Wesley So – chess grandmaster, World Fischer Random Chess Champion, and 3-time and the current U.S. Chess Champion.
- Christina Marie Williams (1985–1998) – murdered child.
