= De La Soulviet =

Remix album by TenDJiz
- Released: 2011
- Genre: Mash-up, hip hop
- Length: 42:24
- Label: Self-released
- Producer: TenDJiz

TenDJiz chronology
| De La Soulviet (2011) | Commonasm (2012) |

De La Soulviet is a mashup album produced and mixed by Miami-based producer and sound engineer TenDJiz. It uses acapellas of hip-hop trio De La Soul and couples it with instrumentals created from Soviet soul and jazz samples. The album was released on October 1, 2011.

== Reception ==
The album has received positive reviews from critics. Jeff Weiss of The Los Angeles Times stated "the blends are artfully done and the samples are tastefully chosen." The Miami New Times named the album "Mashup Revolution". Melissa Enaje, contributor of The Source Magazine, said "Once I heard the album, my neck muscles were probably strained from how much I was nodding my head in appreciation for the sound. It was def in tune with the essence of hip-hop...". Roslynn Cobarrubias, the Senior Director of Urban Marketing at MySpace Music posted the album on her blog. Edith Zimmerman of New York Magazine and Esquire described "De La Soulviet" as "great". Jarry L. Barrow, the editor-in-chief of Scratch Magazine, said that TenDJiz "ingeniously mixed them [De La Soul] with Soviet soul and jazz. The result is inspiring." DeVon Thompson from Creative Beach claims that "the mix sounds like it could be the original!". The album has been featured on many on-line magazines and music websites such as: Blurt Magazine, Peace Magazine, Rumba Magazine (Finland), Radio Nova (France), Rubyhornet.com, Thewordisbond.com, Fleamarketfunk.com, Bamalovesoul.com, Blockmuzikradio.com

== Track listing ==
| No. | Title | Length |
|---|---|---|
| 1. | "Oooh" | 4:10 |
| 2. | "The Grind Date" | 3:02 |
| 3. | "Stakes is High" | 3:33 |
| 4. | "Trouble in the Water" | 3:32 |
| 5. | "Shoomp" | 3:20 |
| 6. | "Hold Tight" | 3:37 |
| 7. | "All Good" | 3:33 |
| 8. | "More Than You Know" | 4:17 |
| 9. | "Jenifa Taught Me" | 4:16 |
| 10. | "Much More" | 3:18 |
| 11. | "Itzsoweezee" | 3:53 |
| 12. | "Rock Co.Kane" | 1:48 |
