= TenDJiz =

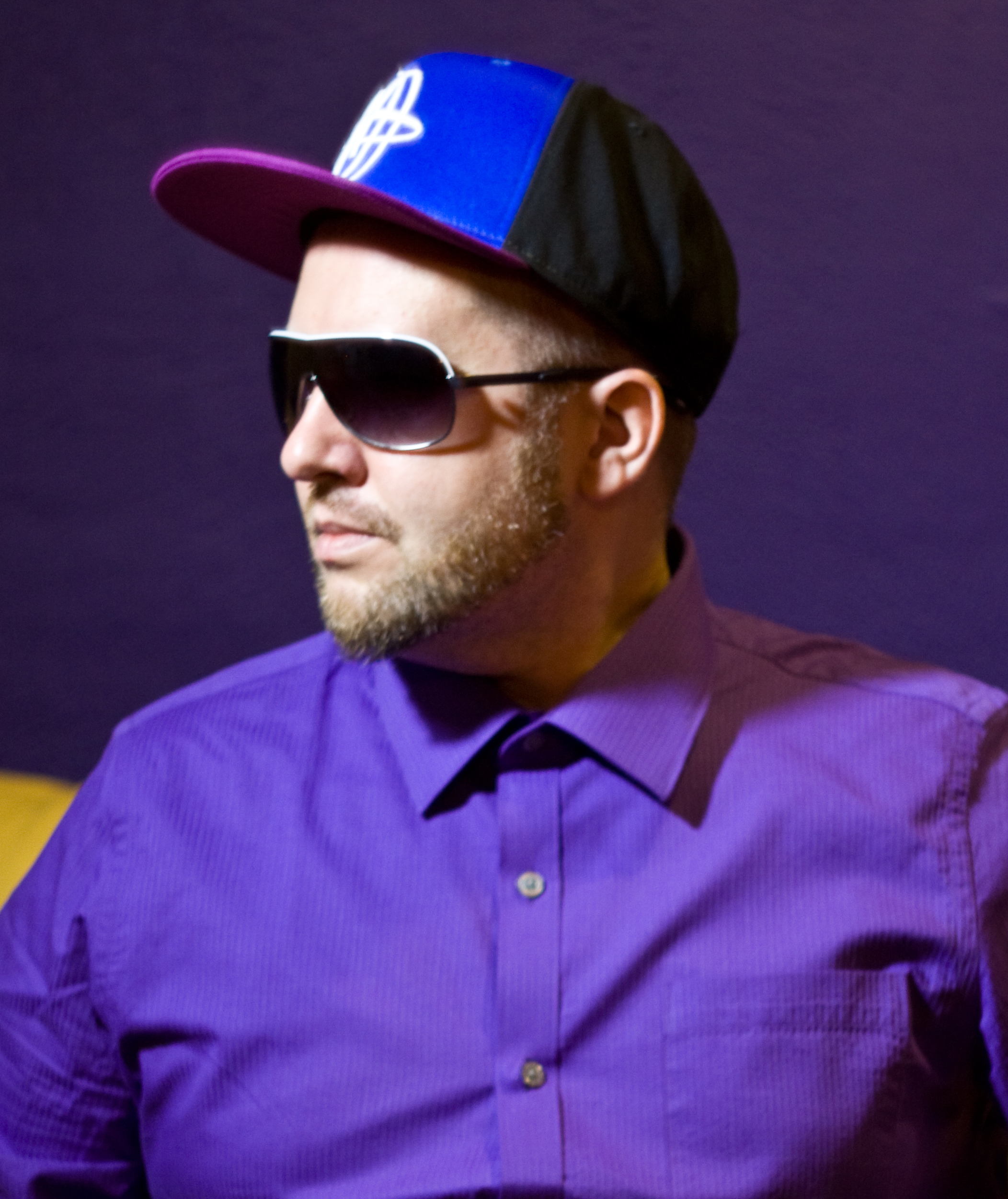

Background information
- Also known as: TenDJiz, DJ Tengiz
- Born: Denis Chernyshov
- Origin: Saint-Petersburg, Russia
- Genres: Hip-Hop, R&B, Synth-Soul
- Occupations: Record producer, Sound engineer
- Labels: TenDJiz Music
- Website: Official website

TenDJiz (born Denis Chernyshov) is a Russian-born, Miami-based producer and sound engineer, best known for his albums CommoNasm, De La Soulviet and Q-Tipokratiya, that were created by blending acapellas of Common and Nas, De La Soul, Q-Tip with instrumentals composed from Soviet Jazz samples.

== The Soulviet Trilogy ==
TenDJiz produced and mixed the Soulviet Trilogy which consists of 3 albums: De La Soulviet (2011), Q-Tipokratiya (2012) and CommoNasm (2012) that were created by blending acapellas of American hip-hop artists (De La Soul, Q-Tip, Common and Nas) with instrumentals composed from Soviet Soul and Jazz samples.

The albums from the Soulviet Trilogy have received positive reviews from critics and music industry's influential people. Jeff Weiss of The Los Angeles Times said about De La Soulviet: "the blends are artfully done and the samples are tastefully chosen." Roslynn Cobarrubias, the Senior Director of Urban Marketing at MySpace Music called the concept of De la Soulviet "awesome" and posted the album on her blog. The Miami New Times named De La Soulviet "Mashup Revolution". Okayplayer claims "TenDJiz made a splash with his De La Soulviet mixtape". Chris Salmon of The Guardian said about Q-Tipokratiya: "It works rather well." On-line magazine egotripland.com described Q-Tipokratiya as "pretty clever stuff." Common tweeted about CommoNasm and called it "Fresh" The Miami New Times named TenDJiz "the mastermind behind an awesome mixtape series". Soulbounce.com (winner of the 2010 Soul Train Awards) claims that "TenDJiz's production, mixing and scratching is near flawless."Respect magazine described CommoNasm as "an incredibly ambitious and awing project." CommoNasm was called "flawless mashup" by HipHopDX.com and described as "amazing" by 2dopeboyz.com. Fashion Nerrd Magazine claims that the Soulviet Trilogy is "a bridging of the gap between the two formerly antagonistic superpower nations"

The albums have been featured on many on-line magazines and music websites such as: Blurt Magazine, Peace Magazine, Nodfactor.com, Rumba Magazine (Finland), Radio Nova (France), Rubyhornet.com, Thewordisbond.com, Slang Magazine, Fleamarketfunk.com, Bamalovesoul.com, Blockmuzikradio.com, ProducersIKnow.com, Kevinnottingham.com

== Mixing ==
TenDJiz's mixing and mastering credits include work for two-time Grammy winner Federico Britos, Emmy winner Jorge Heilpern, Big Pooh, Chaundon, Rapsody, Killah Priest, Dynas (BBE Record Label), J.Nics, Skam2, Anjuli Stars, Vurn. IMF Magazine called TenDJiz "the very talented engineer and producer". The album "Elevation" by Vurn recorded and mixed by TenDJiz was named one of The Best 20 Free Albums of The First Half of 2011 on Kevinnottingham.com. "The Executive Suite" LP (mixed/mastered by TenDJiz) has earned a 4.8/5.0 rating on DJBooth.net

== Russian Projects ==
In Russia, TenDJiz has produced and mixed songs for Mister Maloy (in Russian), Ligalize (winner of the 2006 MTV Music Awards), CENTR (winner of the 2008 MTV Music Awards), Detsl (winner of the 2000 MTV International Viewer's Choice Awards), Bad Balance. He also produced music for the Sprite TV Commercial and soundtracks for video games (Nuclear Titbit (in Russian), winner of the 2004 Gameland Awards).

== Selected discography ==
Artist	Release	Year	Credit
TenDJiz	Synth Souls	2015	Production / Mixing
TenDJiz	CommoNasm	2012	Production / Mixing
TenDJiz	Q-Tipokratiya	2012	Production / Mixing
TenDJiz	De La Soulviet	2011	Production / Mixing
TenDJiz	2010GIZ	2011	Production (7 of 20) / Recording / Mixing / Mastering
Compilation (Big Pooh, Donny Goines, Raven Sorvino and more)	The Executive Suite	2012	Mixing / Mastering
Dynas (f. Killah Priest, Reks, Ty)	The Planet	2012	Mixing / Mastering
Vurn	Elevation	2011	Recording / Mixing / Mastering
YNG	No Sleep Till Boogie	2011	Production ("Miami" song) / Recording / Mixing / Mastering
Detsl	Ulichny boyets (translation: Street Fighter)	2001	Production / Mixing
Bad Balance	Kameniy Les (translation: Stone Forest)	2001	Mixing
