= Mail Order Bride =

A mail-order bride is a woman who advertises her willingness to marry internationally to better her standard of living.

Mail Order Bride may also refer to:

- Mail Order Bride (1964 film), starring Keir Dullea, Lois Nettleton, and Buddy Ebsen
- Mail Order Bride (1984 film), a 1984 Australian television film
- Mail Order Bride (2003 film), a 2003 American comedy film starring Danny Aiello
- Mail Order Bride (2008 film), a Hallmark Channel made-for-TV movie starring Daphne Zuniga
- Mail Order Brides (artist collaborative), a Filipina American artist trio
- "Mail Order Bride", a song by Dan Kelly & The Alpha Males on their album Drowning in the Fountain of Youth
- "Mail Order Bride", an episode of the first season of Aqua Teen Hunger Force

== See also ==
- "Mail Order Annie", a song by Harry Chapin on his album Short Stories
