= Edward Soriano =

American retired military officer (born 1946)

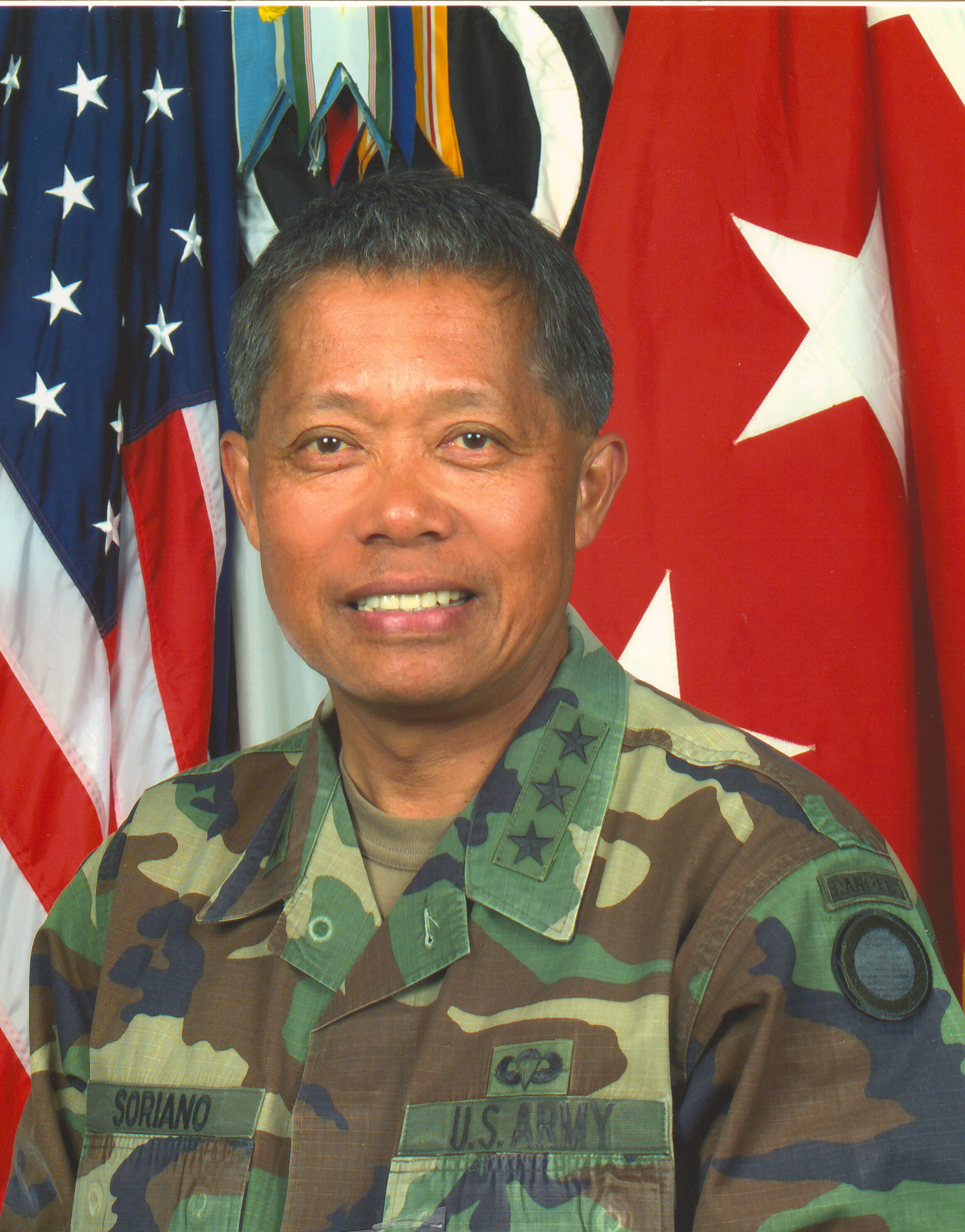
- Soriano in 2009
- Born: 12 November 1946 (age 79); Alcala, Pangasinan, Philippines
- Spouse: Vivian
- Military career
- Allegiance: United States
- Branch: United States Army
- Service years: 1970–2005
- Rank: Lieutenant general
- Units: 82d Airborne Division; 3d Infantry Division; 1st Infantry Division
- Commands: I Corps; 7th Infantry Division
- Conflicts: Operation Desert Shield; Gulf War; Operation Joint Endeavor
- Awards: Army Distinguished Service Medal (2); Defense Superior Service Medal; Legion of Merit (5); Bronze Star Medal

Edward Soriano (born 12 November 1946) is an American retired lieutenant general. He is the highest-ranking Filipino American officer to have served in the United States military, and the first promoted to a general officer. Born in the Philippines, Soriano moved with his family to the United States and graduated from Salinas High School before being commissioned as an officer through Army Reserve Officers' Training Corps at San Jose State University.

Soriano served with infantry units throughout the United States, Korea, and in West Germany. Later, Soriano was a liaison officer during operations Desert Shield and Desert Storm, and deployed during Operation Joint Endeavor; he retired in March 2005. Since retiring from the army, Soriano has worked for the aerospace and defense technology company Northrop Grumman and has sat on various boards of directors.

== Early and personal life ==
Born on 12 November 1946 in Pangasinan, Philippines, to Ilocos Sur natives, Soriano came to the United States in the early 1950s when his father, Fred Soriano, a soldier in the United States Army, was assigned to Fort Benning, Georgia; he was six when he left the Philippines. Soriano's mother's name was Encarnacion. Soriano's father was a corporal in the 57th Infantry (Philippine Scouts) during World War II. After the surrender of American forces on Bataan to the Japanese, the elder Soriano became a prisoner of war and was subjected to the Bataan Death March. The elder Soriano later served in the Korean War, and again became a prisoner of war. During the Korean War, young Edward and the rest of his family moved from Guam back to the Philippines. His father later retired from the army as a major. In the 1960s, his family moved to Salinas, California, and Soriano later graduated from Salinas High School. His father's service inspired Edward Soriano to join the military.

Soriano graduated from San Jose State University (SJSU) in 1970 with a Bachelor of Arts degree in Business Administration and General Management, and later earned a Master of Public Administration from the University of Missouri. Soriano is married to Vivian Guillermo, who was born in the United States to Laoag natives. The couple have two children, Melissa and Keith.

== Military career ==
Date of rank
Rank	Date
2LT	23 January 1970
1LT	23 January 1971
CPT	23 January 1974
MAJ	8 January 1981
LTC	1 April 1987
COL	1 June 1991
BG	1 October 1995
MG	1 November 1998
LTG	12 August 2002

Soriano was commissioned as an infantry officer through the Army Reserve Officers' Training Corps at SJSU, in 1970. Soriano's first assignment was at the Recondo School at Fort Bragg, North Carolina, which was followed by command of an anti-tank platoon in the 508th Infantry. Soriano was then sent to Korea where he commanded Combat Support Company, 1st Battalion, 23d Infantry, 2nd Infantry Division, before he was transferred to command Company A, 3d Battalion, 47th Infantry, 3d Brigade, 9th Infantry Division at Fort Lewis, Washington. After attending the United States Army Infantry School at Fort Benning, Soriano served with the United States Army Recruiting Command in Albany, New York, before commanding Company C, 1st Battalion, 39th Infantry Regiment, 8th Infantry Division in Germany. Following his service in Europe, Soriano attended the United States Army Command and General Staff College at Fort Leavenworth and University of Missouri, Kansas City, before serving in the Office of the Deputy Chief of Staff for Operations and Plans and in the Office of the Deputy Chief of Staff for Personnel at The Pentagon. After his service in The Pentagon, he commanded 2nd Battalion, 41st Infantry, 2nd Armored Division at Fort Hood, Texas, before attending the United States Army War College and returning to The Pentagon.

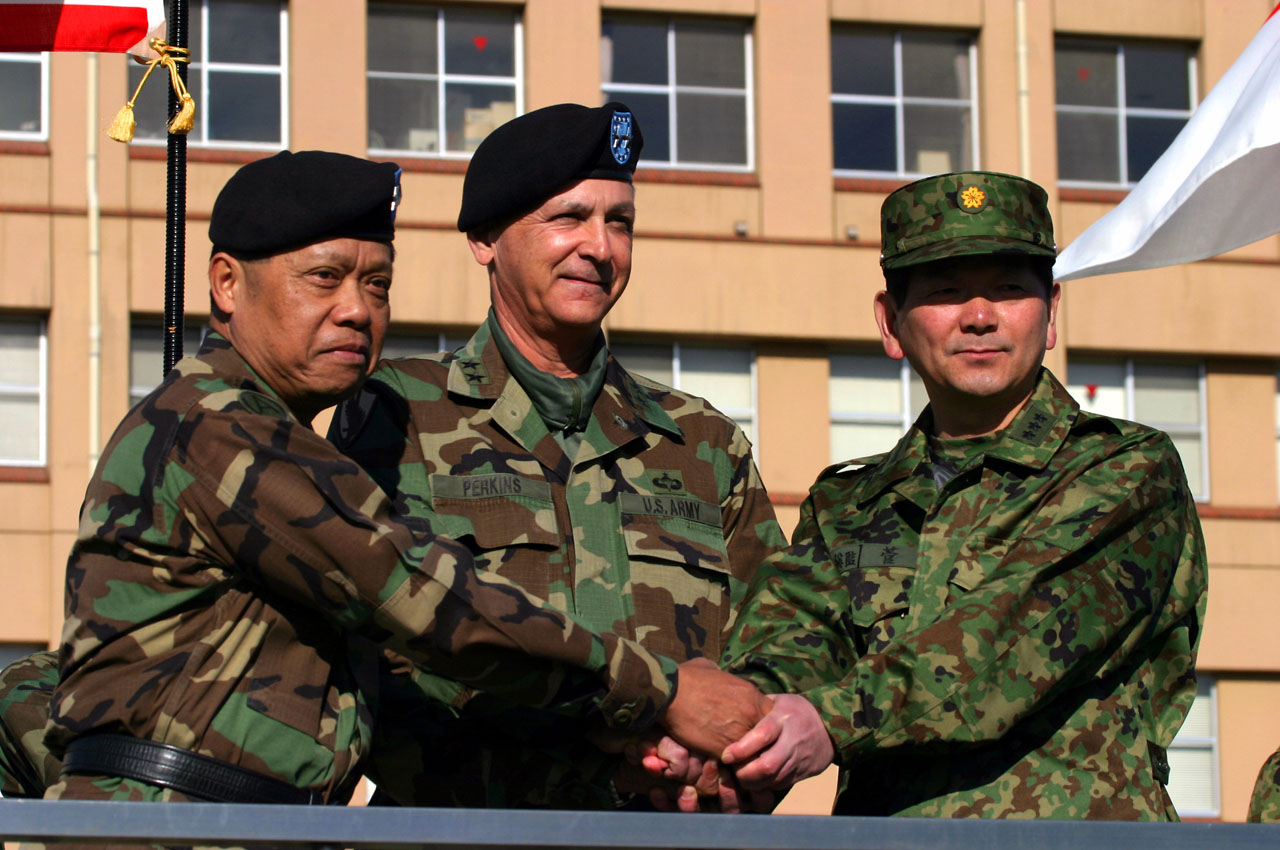
LTG Soriano, Chūshou Hirotoshi Kan, and MG Perkins shaking hands in 2004

During operations Desert Shield and Desert Storm, Soriano served as the chief of the liaison team to the 1st Marine Expeditionary Force. After the conflict ended, Soriano contributed to the Secretary of Defense's Gulf War Report as the chief of the army section while serving in the Office of the Chief of Staff. In 1992, Soriano received his first assignment at Fort Carson, Colorado, as the commander of the 1st Brigade, 4th Infantry Division. Following this command, Soriano returned to Germany to serve with the 3d and 1st Infantry Divisions, which included deployments to Bosnia for peacekeeping during Operation Joint Endeavor. Returning to the United States, he undertook various positions in Virginia and The Pentagon, including service as Director, Officer Personnel Management, within the Total Army Personnel Command. From 1999 to 2001, Soriano commanded the 7th Infantry Division and Fort Carson. Soriano served as Director of Homeland Security for United States Joint Forces Command from October 2001 to August 2002, which laid the foundations for what has become the Northern Command.

Soriano's final assignment was command of I Corps and Fort Lewis, beginning in August 2002. Under his leadership, Fort Lewis became a force provider for Operation Iraqi Freedom, including the first deployment of the Stryker with the 2nd Infantry Division. In June 2004, as the commander of Fort Lewis, Soriano ordered the court-martial of Ryan G. Anderson, who was convicted of providing aid to al-Qaeda and was sentenced in September 2004 to life in prison with the possibility of parole after Soriano removed the death penalty as a possible sentencing option. In September 2004, Soriano met with Philippine President Gloria Macapagal Arroyo at Malacanang, who he had met before during Arroyo's state visit in May 2003, after being invited by General Narciso Abaya, Chief of Staff of the Armed Forces of the Philippines. In November 2004, Soriano turned over command of I Corps and Fort Lewis to Lieutenant General James M. Dubik, and finally retired from active duty on 1 March 2005.

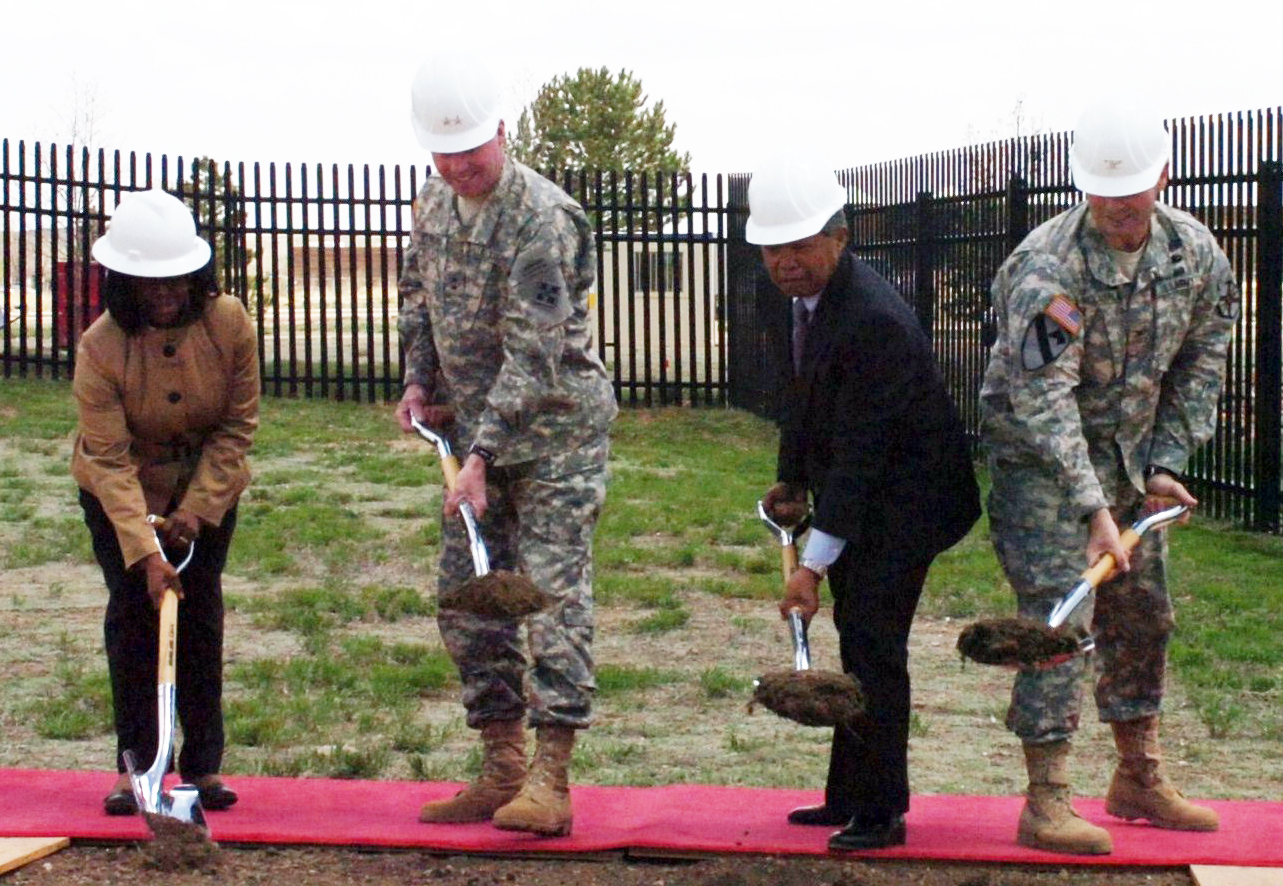
(from the left) Barbara Myrick, MG David G. Perkins, Soriano, and COL Robert McLaughlin at the Fort Carson Museum groundbreaking in 2010

== Post-military career ==
Since his retirement, Soriano has worked for Northrop Grumman as the Director of Training and Exercises for Homeland Security and Joint Forces Support. He has also sat on numerous boards of directors including Home Front Cares and Goodwill Industries of Colorado Springs. Additionally, Soriano is the current president of the board of directors of the Mountain Post Historical Center at Fort Carson, and the vice-chairman of the Colorado Springs Chamber of Commerce's military affairs committee. Along with retired Major General Antonio Taguba, Soriano has been active in ceremonies to provide facsimiles of Filipino Veterans of World War II Congressional Gold Medal to surviving veterans and their family members.

== Awards and decorations ==
Soriano received the following awards and decorations:

=== Medals and ribbons ===
Distinguished Service Medal with Oak Leaf Cluster
Defense Superior Service Medal
Legion of Merit with 4 Oak Leaf Clusters
Bronze Star Medal
Defense Meritorious Service Medal
Meritorious Service Medal with 3 Oak Leaf Clusters
Army Commendation Medal with Oak Leaf Cluster
Navy and Marine Corps Commendation Medal
Army Achievement Medal

=== Badges ===
Expert Infantryman Badge
Basic Parachutist Badge
Ranger Tab
Office of the Secretary of Defense Identification Badge
Army Staff Identification Badge

== See also ==
- Eldon Regua
- List of notable Filipino American servicemembers
