= Querubin =

Querubin is a surname. Notable people with this surname include:

- Ariel Querubin (born 1956), Philippine military official
- Nelfa Querubin (born 1941), Philippine Ceramic artist

== See also ==
- Tropical Depression Querubin
