= Rudolph B. Davila =

US Army officer and Medal of Honor recipient (1916–2002)

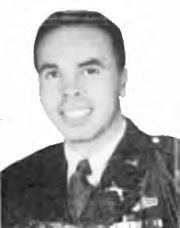
- First Lieutenant Rudolph B. Davila, Medal of Honor recipient
- Born: April 27, 1916; El Paso, Texas, US
- Died: January 26, 2002 (aged 85); Vista, California, US
- Burial place: Arlington National Cemetery
- Military career
- Allegiance: United States of America
- Branch: United States Army
- Service years: 1941–1945
- Rank: First Lieutenant
- Units: Company H, 7th Infantry Regiment, 3rd Infantry Division
- Conflicts: World War II
- Awards: Medal of Honor; Purple Heart
- Other work: Teacher

Rudolph Bianco Davila (April 27, 1916 – January 26, 2002), born in El Paso, Texas, was a United States Army officer, of Spanish-Filipino descent, who received the Medal of Honor for his actions in Italy during World War II. He was the only person of Filipino ancestry to receive the medal for their actions in the European theatre. He was initially awarded the Distinguished Service Cross. However, in 1998, after an extensive review, his medal was upgraded to the Medal of Honor.

== Early years ==
Davila was born to a Spanish father and a Filipino mother in El Paso, Texas. His family moved to Watts, California when he was a child. There he was raised and received his primary and secondary education. Davila enlisted in the Army from Los Angeles in March 1941.

== World War II ==
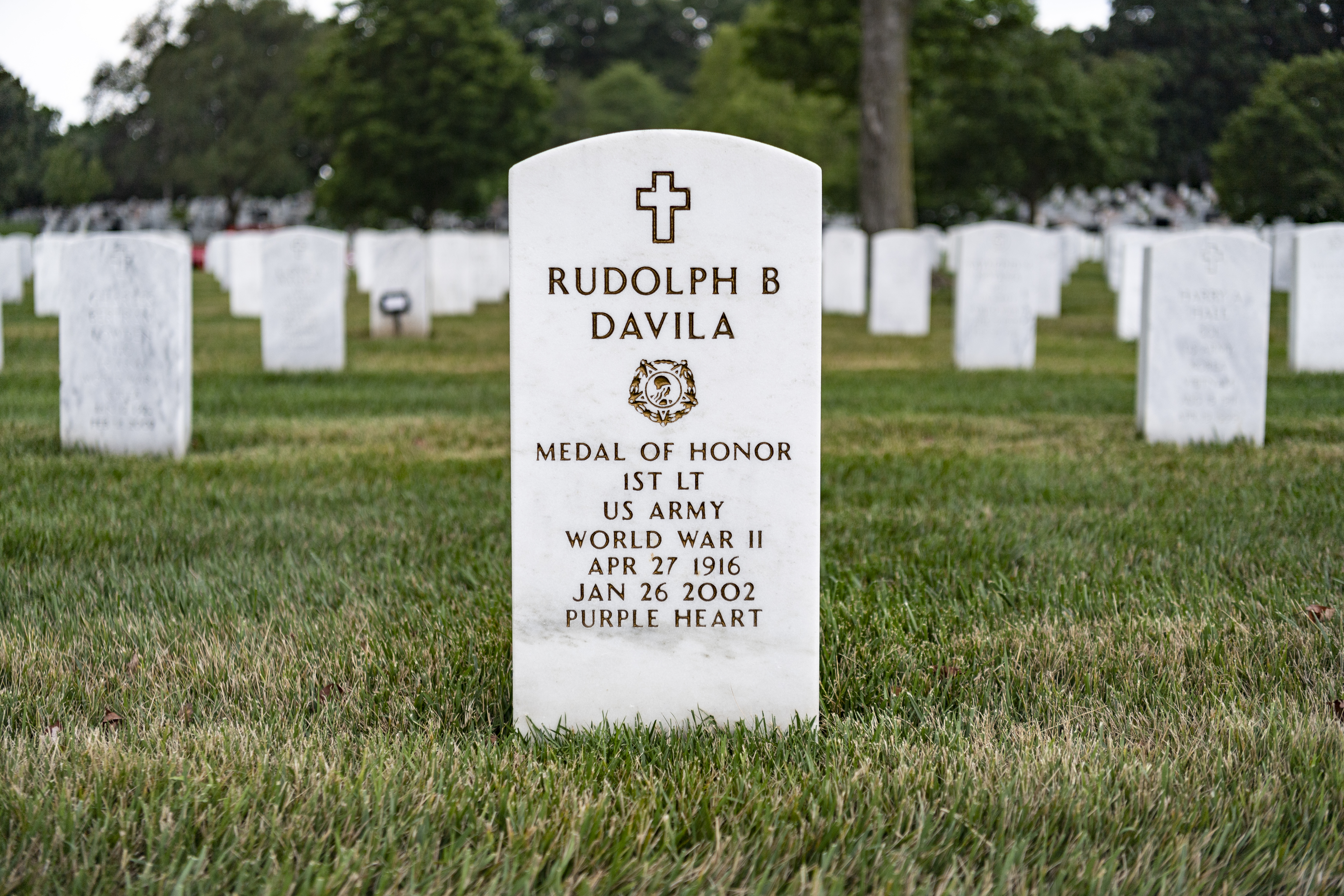
Grave at Arlington National Cemetery

Davila was a United States Army Staff Sergeant assigned to Company H of the 7th Infantry Regiment, 3rd Infantry Division. On May 28, 1944, his company was involved in an offensive, near Artena, Italy, which broke through the German mountain strongholds surrounding the Anzio beachhead. His company was under a heavy enemy attack and for an unknown reason his machine gunners were reluctant to risk putting their guns into action. Realizing that his company was in danger, Davila crawled 50 yards to the nearest machine gun and fired over 750 rounds into the enemy strongholds in the foothills.

His fellow machine gunners reacted and Davila directed their firepower with hand and arm signals until the two enemy hostile machine guns were silenced. Despite being wounded by the enemy, he continued his assault by engaging the enemy from the turret of a burnt tank.

Davila then spotted what he believed to be a rifle barrel in a farmhouse window. He grabbed a rifle and two grenades and went inside the farmhouse. He tossed the grenades at the attic and shot at the troops inside, destroying two more enemy machine gun nests. The enemy was forced to abandon their prepared positions.

Davila received a battlefield commission to Lieutenant and even though a Captain in the rifle company said he would recommend Davila for the Medal of Honor, the highest honor for battlefield valor, Davila was instead awarded the Distinguished Service Cross, the Army's second highest military honor.

Davila continued to serve with his company after he recovered from his leg wound. A few months after the Artena attack, Davila found himself in France's Vosges Mountains. He received a chest wound from a shell which ricocheted off a tree as he was ordering his men to storm a German tank. The tank shell caused injuries that left his right arm paralyzed.

== Back home ==
Davila was treated for his wounds at a hospital in Modesto, California. There he met a nurse by the name of Harriet and three months later they were married. He continued his education and earned a bachelor's and master's degrees from the University of Southern California, and became a high school history teacher in Los Angeles. He moved to Vista in 1977 with his wife after he retired from teaching.

His wife, Harriet Davila, lobbied Army officials to award the Medal of Honor to her husband based on the actions he performed during the Allied offensive in Italy, after she became aware of her husband's actions. For years, she petitioned the government for her husband's medal — making phone calls, writing letters and researching military records to prove her husband deserved the Medal of Honor. No reply ever came.

== DSC upgraded to Medal of Honor ==
In 1996, Hawaii Senator Daniel Akaka secured a Congressionally mandated review of records for Asian-Americans who had earned the Distinguished Service Cross in World War II. Congress reviewed the records to determine whether they were unfairly denied the military's highest award for valor.

On June 21, 2000, President Bill Clinton, bestowed the Medal of Honor on Davila and 21 other World War II servicemen of Asian descent at a White House ceremony. Only seven of 22 recipients were still alive when the medals were handed out. Previously only two of the 40,000-plus Asian-Americans who served in World War II had been awarded the Medal of Honor.

Army Secretary Louis Caldera inducted the soldiers into the Pentagon's Hall of Heroes on June 22. Harriet Davila, his wife, had died six months before, on December 25, 1999.

== Medal of Honor citation ==
Davila, Rudolph B.

Rank and organization: Staff Sergeant, U.S. Army, Company H, 7th Infantry.
Place and date: Artena, Italy, May 28, 1944
Entered service at: Los Angeles, Calif.
Born: April 27, 1916, El Paso, TX

Staff Sergeant Rudolph B. Davila distinguished himself by extraordinary heroism in action, on 28 May 1944, near Artena, Italy. During the offensive which broke through the German mountain strongholds surrounding the Anzio beachhead, Staff Sergeant Davila risked death to provide heavy weapons support for a beleaguered rifle company. Caught on an exposed hillside by heavy, grazing fire from a well-entrenched German force, his machine gunners were reluctant to risk putting their guns into action. Crawling fifty yards to the nearest machine gun, Staff Sergeant Davila set it up alone and opened fire on the enemy. In order to observe the effect of his fire, Sergeant Davila fired from the kneeling position, ignoring the enemy fire that struck the tripod and passed between his legs. Ordering a gunner to take over, he crawled forward to a vantage point and directed the firefight with hand and arm signals until both hostile machine guns were silenced. Bringing his three remaining machine guns into action, he drove the enemy to a reserve position two hundred yards to the rear. When he received a painful wound in the leg, he dashed to a burned tank and, despite the crash of bullets on the hull, engaged a second enemy force from the tank's turret. Dismounting, he advanced 130 yards in short rushes, crawled 20 yards and charged into an enemy-held house to eliminate the defending force of five with a hand grenade and rifle fire. Climbing to the attic, he straddled a large shell hole in the wall and opened fire on the enemy. Although the walls of the house were crumbling, he continued to fire until he had destroyed two more machine guns. His intrepid actions brought desperately needed heavy weapons support to a hard-pressed rifle company and silenced four machine gunners, which forced the enemy to abandon their prepared positions. Staff Sergeant Davila's extraordinary heroism and devotion to duty are in keeping with the highest traditions of military service and reflect great credit on him, his unit, and the United States Army.

— Home of Heroes

== Later years ==
Subsequently, Davila was honored by the city of Vista. He served as the guest speaker at the Veterans of Foreign Wars' Memorial Day ceremony in 2001.

Davila died of cancer on January 26, 2002, in Vista, California. He was buried at Arlington National Cemetery, Arlington, Virginia.

== Awards and recognitions ==
Among Davila's decorations and medals were the following:

| Badge | Combat Infantryman Badge | | |
| 1st row | Medal of Honor | | |
| 2nd row | Bronze Star Medal | Purple Heart | American Defense Service Medal |
| 3rd row | American Campaign Medal | European–African–Middle Eastern Campaign Medal with 1 Campaign Star | World War II Victory Medal |

Foreign unit decorations

- Fourragère cord

== See also ==
- List of Medal of Honor recipients
- List of Medal of Honor recipients for World War II
- Hispanic Medal of Honor recipients
- List of Filipino Americans
- Hispanic Americans in World War II
