= Asia Jackson =

American actress (born 1994)

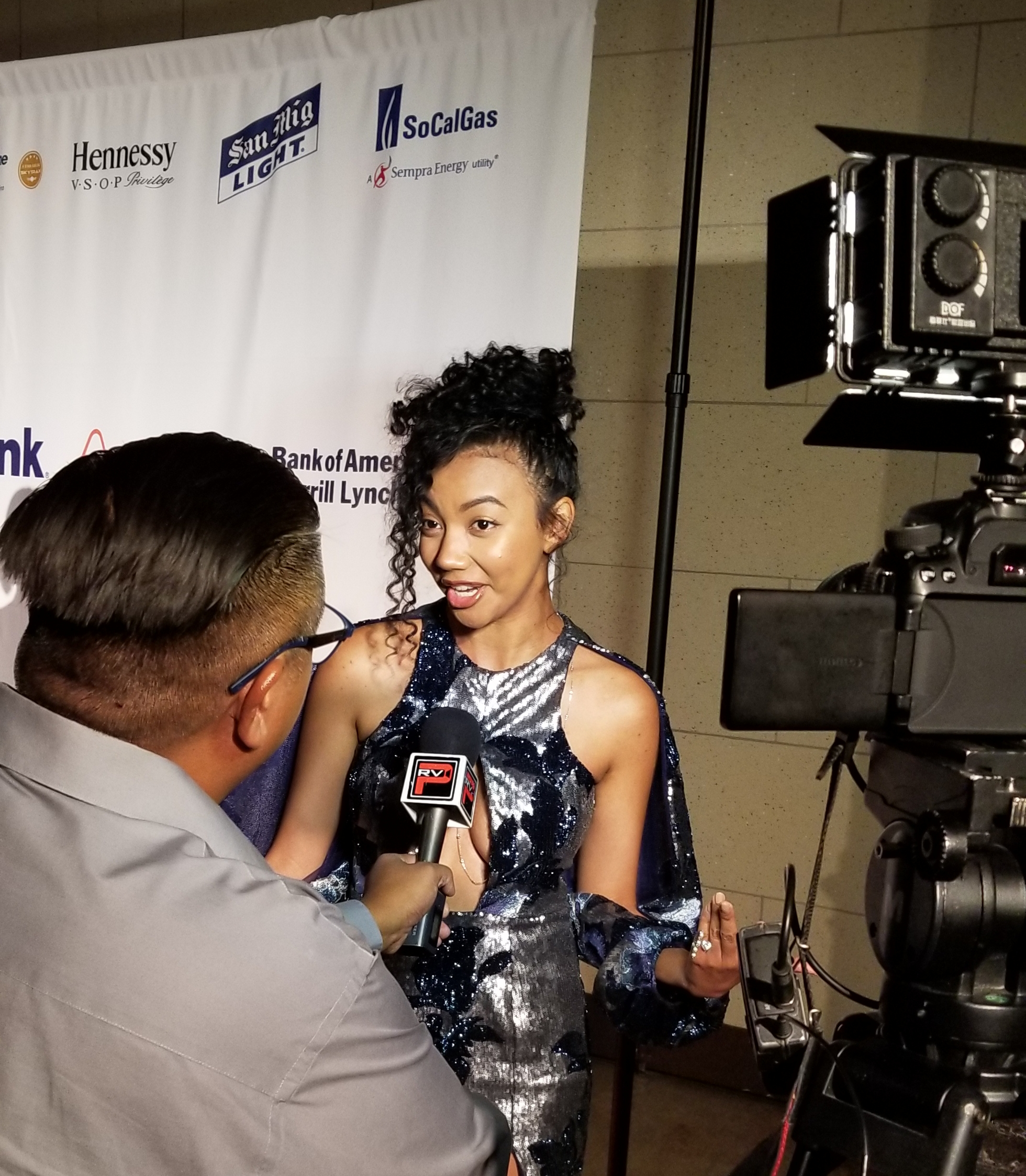
- Jackson in 2018
- Born: May 25, 1994 (age 32); California, United States
- Occupations: actress; YouTuber; activist
- Years active: 2016–present
- Website: http://www.asiajackson.com

Asia Jackson (born May 25, 1994) is an American actress, YouTuber, and activist of African-American and Filipino descent. In 2016, she created the #MagandangMorenx (literally translated to "beautiful brown skin") movement to combat colorism in Filipino communities worldwide.

== Early life and education ==
Jackson was born on May 25, 1994 in California. As a child of a member of the U.S. military she lived in various U.S. and Asia locations including Tokyo, Japan, and Baguio City, Philippines. Her father is Black-American and served in the United States Air Force. Her mother is ethnically Igorot from Baguio City, Philippines. She originally attended college for computer information systems before dropping out to become an actress. She attended Woodrow Wilson Classical High School in Long Beach, California.

== Career ==
=== Acting ===
After dropping out of college, Jackson began taking acting classes. In 2016, she appeared in her first billed television role on ABC's Modern Family. Her first feature film Stalked By A Reality Star premiered on Lifetime in 2018.

=== YouTube ===
In 2016, Jackson started uploading videos to her YouTube channel where she chronicles her day to day life as an actress and shares beauty and fashion tips.

As a beauty influencer, she has worked with brands such as Sephora, Armani, Neutrogena, and Laura Mercier. She was a Proactiv ambassador in 2018.

=== Fashion ===
In celebration of Filipino-American History Month, Jackson collaborated with the Asian-American woman owned streetwear brand UPRISERS in October 2019. She created a capsule collection of clothing and accessories with messaging like "MORENX" (translated to: "brown skin") and "You Can't Tell Me Who I Am" to empower people with marginalized identities.

As a fashion influencer, she has worked with brands such as Nike, Coach, and Farfetch.

== Activism ==
Jackson created the Twitter movement #MagandangMorenx in October 2016 to "celebrate the diversity of Filipino beauty", "reject long established and elitist beauty standards", and "promote self love and self acceptance". The movement seeks to challenge and dismantle colorism in Filipino and Asian communities. It originated on Twitter but has crossed over to platforms like Instagram and Facebook. She originally started #MagandangMorenx as a way to celebrate Filipino-American History Month. Jackson has spoken at numerous universities across the United States, such as UC Berkeley and Syracuse University, about colorism in Filipino communities as well as in Western media.

In 2023, in the wake of the Gaza war, she became involved with a public dispute with comedian Amy Schumer about the career ramifications of supporting Israel and Palestine, which was further amplified by actress Mia Khalifa.

== Filmography ==
=== Film ===
| Year | Title | Role |
|---|---|---|
| 2018 | Stalked By A Reality Star | Mischa |
| 2020 | Nocturne | Abigail |

=== Television ===
| Year | Title | Role | Notes |
|---|---|---|---|
| 2016 | Modern Family | Prom Dress Student | 1 episode |
| 2017 | The Young and the Restless | Emma | 1 episode |
| 2017 | Superstore | Kylie | 1 episode |
| 2017 | Speechless | Heather | 1 episode |
| 2018 | Alone Together | Charlene | 1 episode |

== See also ==
- List of African-Americans
- List of Asian-Americans
- List of Filipino-Americans
