= Commonasm =

CommoNasm
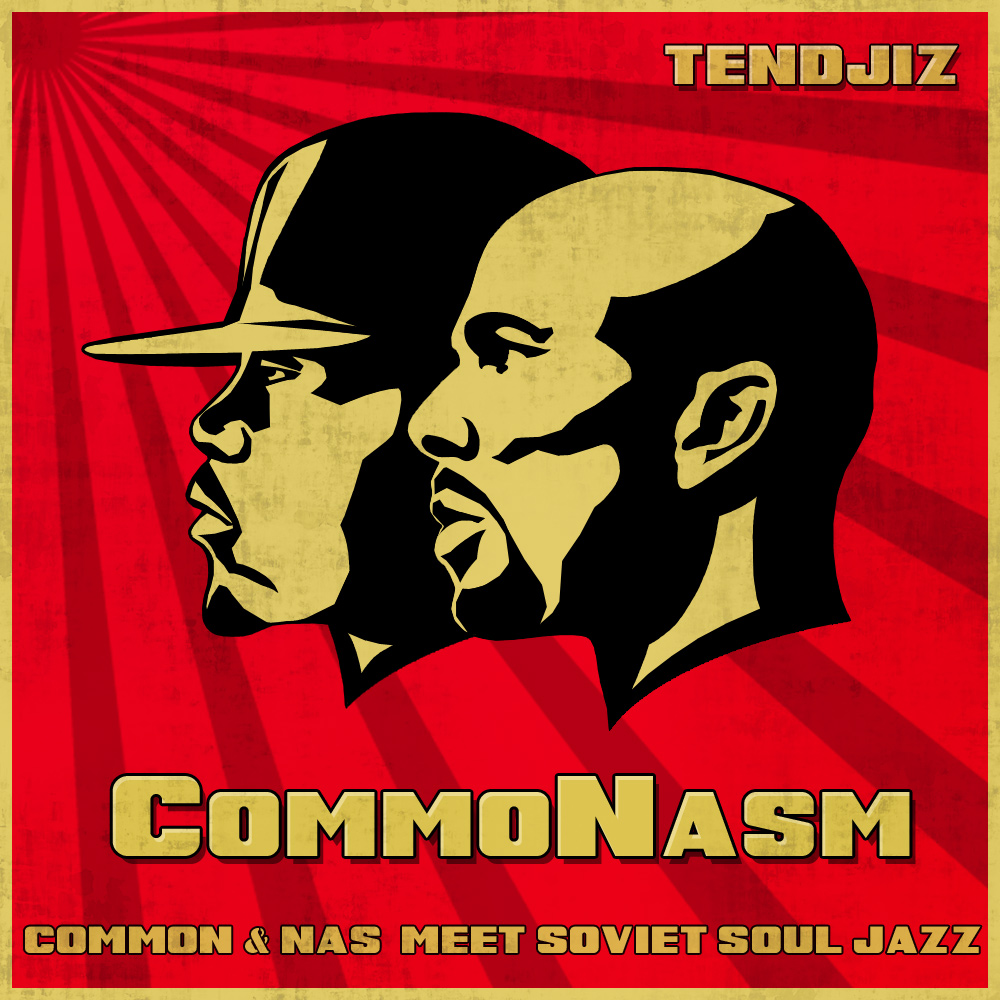

Remix album by TenDJiz
- Released: 2012
- Genre: Mash-up, hip hop
- Length: 32:19
- Label: Self-released
- Producer: TenDJiz

TenDJiz chronology
De La Soulviet (2011)	CommoNasm (2012)	CommoNasm (2012)

CommoNasm is a mashup album produced and mixed by Miami-based producer and sound engineer TenDJiz. It was created by blending the acapellas of Common and Nas with instrumentals composed from Soviet soul and jazz samples. The album was released on July 10, 2012.

== Reception ==
The project has received positive reviews from critics. The Miami New Times named TenDJiz "the mastermind behind an awesome mixtape series that mashes Soviet jazz instrumentals with American hip-hop.". Soulbounce.com (winner of the 2010 Soul Train Awards) claims that "TenDJiz's production, mixing and scratching is near flawless."Respect magazine described CommoNasm as "an incredibly ambitious and awing project." The album was called "flawless mashup" by HipHopDX.com and described as "amazing" by 2dopeboyz.com. Common tweeted about CommoNasm and called it "Fresh". Fashion Nerrd Magazine claims that the Soulviet Trilogy is "a bridging of the gap between the two formerly antagonistic superpower nations". The album has been featured on many on-line magazines and music websites such as: Okayplayer, Nodfactor.com, Rubyhornet.com, Kevinnottingham.com, Peace Magazine, ProducersIKnow.com, LiveAGL.com, Thewellversed.com, Artisticmanifesto.com, Spit-TV.de (Germany)

== Track listing ==
Commonasm track listing
No.	Title	Common's a cappella	Nas' a cappella	Length
1.	"Geto Heaven Can"	"Geto Heaven"	"I Can"	2:51
2.	"Shootouts 1999"	"1-9-9-9"	"Shootouts"	3:56
3.	"NastraDooinit"	"Dooinit"	"Nastradamus"	3:28
4.	"Gladiator Made U Look"	"Gladiator"	"Made You Look"	3:20
5.	"U Gotta Love the Corner"	"The Corner"	"U Gotta Love It"	3:09
6.	"Purple Sun God"	"The Sun God"	"Purple"	2:54
7.	You Gowe Me	"Go"	"You Owe Me"	3:21
8.	"Gold Moment"	"Gold"	"Just a Moment"	3:26
9.	"Reminding Me (of Rule)"	"Reminding Me (of Sef)"	"Rule"	2:49
10.	"One Mic"	—	"One Mic"	3:00
