= Jenifer K. Wofford =

American artist and educator

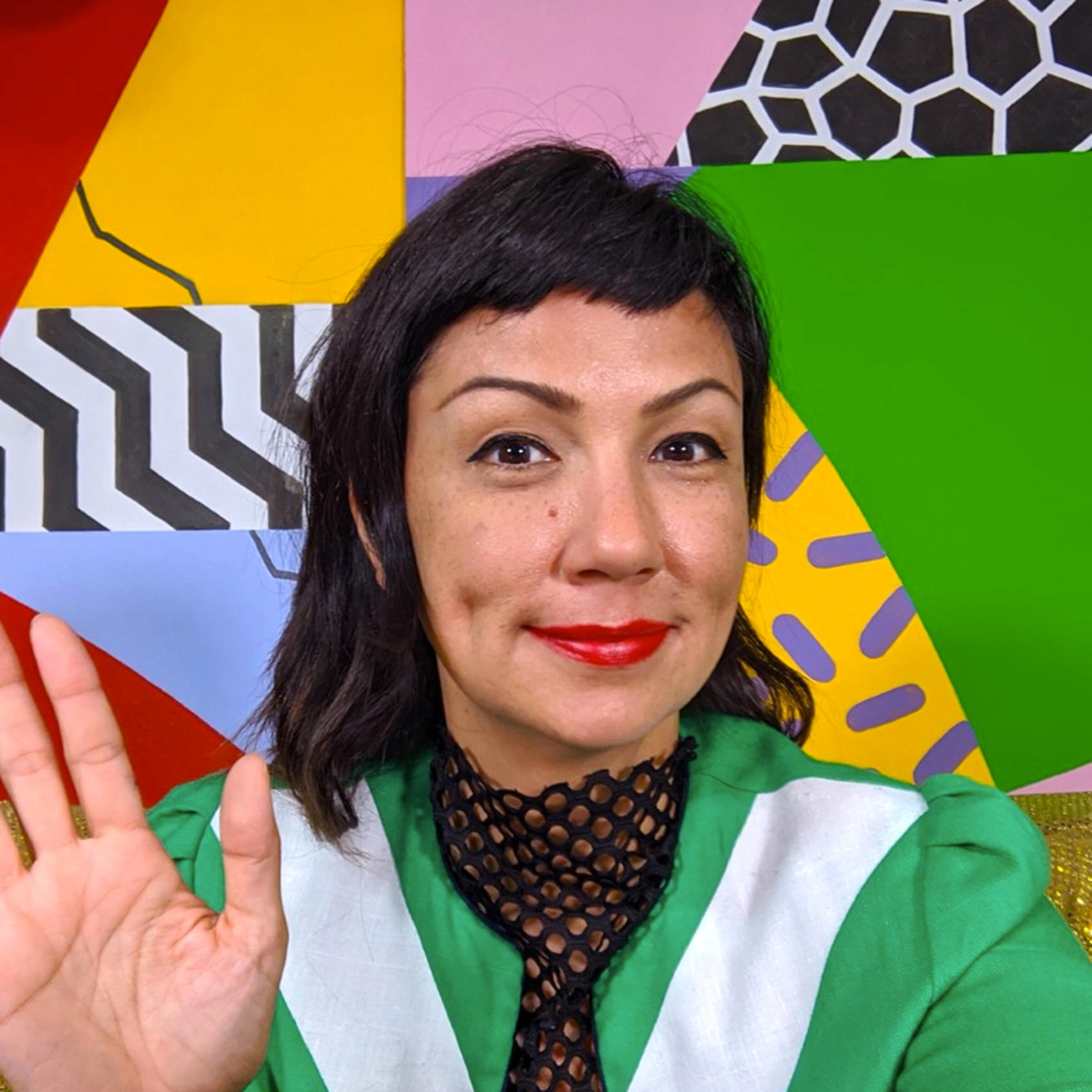
Jenifer K Wofford, 2022

Jenifer K Wofford is an American contemporary artist and art educator based in San Francisco, California, United States. Known for her contributions to Filipino-American visual art, Wofford's work often addresses hybridity, authenticity and global culture, frequently from an ironic, humorous perspective. Wofford collaborates with artists Reanne Estrada and Eliza Barrios as the artist group Mail Order Brides/M.O.B. She was also the curator of Galleon Trade, an international art exchange among California, Mexico and the Philippines.

== Background ==
Wofford was born in San Francisco, and raised in Hong Kong, Dubai, and Kuala Lumpur. Her family returned to California when she was a teenager. Wofford has lived and worked in San Francisco for much of her professional career.

While receiving her BFA degree from the San Francisco Art Institute, Wofford studied with Carlos Villa, whose Worlds In Collision project was of significant influence on her development as an artist and educator. While completing her MFA degree at UC Berkeley, Wofford worked with Catherine Ceniza Choy, whose book Empire of Care influenced the creation of Wofford's Filipina nurse- related art projects. This led to a large body of work featuring Filipina caregivers featured in a 2020 article in Women & Performance: a journal of feminist theory.

== Art ==
Wofford's visual art, performance art and curatorial projects have been presented in the United States, the Philippines, Malaysia, Turkey and Hong Kong. She has also been awarded artist-in-residence stays in France, the Philippines, Italy, Denmark and Norway. Wofford received a 2025 San Francisco Bay Area Artadia Award from Artadia and a 2017 Painters and Sculptors Grant from the Joan Mitchell Foundation.

Wofford's multidisciplinary project "Klub Rupturre!!" focused on Northern California's Loma Prieta earthquake and other cultural events from the year 1989 was presented at Black & White Projects in San Francisco in 2019. Variations on Klub Rupturre!! were subsequently presented at The Great Highway Gallery in San Francisco in 2021 and at Silverlens Gallery in Manila in 2022.

Wofford's 2020 mural, "Pattern Recognition," celebrating Asian and Asian American art, was displayed on the Asian Art Museum's Lui Hyde Street Art Wall in San Francisco from 2020 to 2023. Her mural was vandalized in 2021. A full-scale replica of "Pattern Recognition" was printed and presented on the exterior of the Asia Society in Houston in 2022.

Wofford's work was featured in Alon: Journal of Filipinx American Diaspora Studies in 2023.

Wofford's 2023 solo exhibition "Comfort Room" at Stanford University's Coulter Art Gallery addressed grief and solace. A version of "Comfort Room" was presented by Silverlens Gallery at the 2024 Frieze Art Fair in Los Angeles.

Wofford's SFMOMA mural, "VMD," inspired by Filipina American Olympic champion Victoria Manalo Draves, went on display in the museum in October 2024.

== Awards ==
- 2025 San Francisco Bay Area Artadia Awardee, Artadia, national organization
- 2023 YBCA 100 2023 Honoree, Yerba Buena Center for the Arts, San Francisco, CA
- 2022-24 Lucas Arts Residency Program Fellow, Montalvo Arts Center, Saratoga, CA
- 2021 Meta Open Arts installation commission, Facebook, San Francisco, CA
- 2021 Artist Grant, San Francisco Arts Commission, San Francisco, CA
- 2020 Artist Grant, Balay Kreative, San Francisco, CA
- 2019 Individual Artist Grant, San Francisco Arts Commission, San Francisco, CA
- 2017 Painters and Sculptors Grant, Joan Mitchell Foundation, New York, NY
- 2017 Americans for the Arts Public Art Network Year in Review Selection, Washington, DC
- 2016 Print Public Residency Program Fellowship, Kala Art Institute, Berkeley, CA
- 2012 Investing In Artists Grant, Center for Cultural Innovation, Los Angeles/San Francisco, CA
- 2011 Artist in Residence, Kino Kino, Sandnes, Norway
- 2010 Bogliasco Fellowship, Liguria Study Center, Bogliasco, Italy
- 2009 Eureka Fellowship, Fleishhacker Foundation, San Francisco, CA
- 2007 Guardian Outstanding Local Discovery Award for Visual Art, San Francisco Bay Guardian, San Francisco, CA
- 2007 Art Matters Grant, Art Matters Foundation, New York, NY

== Significant projects ==
- Galleon Trade (2007–08): international curatorial project in San Francisco and Metro Manila
- Flor 1973-78 (2008): public art project in San Francisco
- Manananggoogle (2013–2020): *as Mail Order Brides/M.O.B. installation and performance at San Jose Museum of Art, San Jose, Southern Exposure and SOMArts Cultural Center, San Francisco
- Earthquake Weather (2014): web project and installation
- Collapse (2015): painting series at Silverlens Galleries, Makati
- Limning the Liminal (2019): exhibition of drawings, paintings, prints and artists books at University of San Francisco’s Thacher Gallery
- Klub Rupturre!! (2019): installation, performance, video and paintings presented at Black and White Projects, San Francisco
- Pattern Recognition (2020): mural outside the Asian Art Museum, San Francisco
- Jiayou!! (2021): artwork displayed in collaboration with artist Christy Chan's project "Dear America"
- Fire Season (2021): artwork presented at Berkeley Art Center and Asian Art Museum
- Comfort Room (2023): exhibition at Stanford University's Coulter Art Gallery and Silverlens booth at Frieze LA
- VMD (2024): Mural inspired by Victoria Manalo Draves at SFMOMA

== Teaching ==
Wofford has taught Fine Arts and Philippine Studies courses at the University of San Francisco since 2007. She has also taught and/or advised students at University of California Berkeley, Stanford University, California College of the Arts, San Francisco Art Institute, San Francisco State University, Diablo Valley College and Vermont College of Fine Arts.
