= Manuel Kabajar Cabase =

- "Mahnee" Cabase, Manny Cabase

Background information
- Born: 1 January 1921; Cebu, Philippine Islands
- Died: 23 December 2003 (aged 82); San Francisco, California, United States
- Genres: Jazz, Pop, Latin, world
- Occupation(s): Composer, multi-instrumentalist, bandleader, singer
- Instrument(s): Vocals, piano, bass, drums, guitar, brasses, reeds, percussion

Manuel Kabajar Cabase a.k.a. Mahnee Cabase or Manny Cabase (January 1, 1921 in San Nicolas, Cebu City–December 23, 2003 in San Francisco, California) is a Filipino composer, instrumentalist, and musical director for Visayan movies. Cabase was a singer, songwriter, musical director, computer musician, instrumentalist of at least 28 musical instruments, arranger, conductor, bandleader and musical director. He is also known to his fans as Manny Cabase in the Philippines and/or Mahnee Cabase in the USA. Cabase is the father of the nationally known singer, author, actress, Amapola. Cabase's music is now included in the new Jose R. Gullas Halad Museum in Cebu City. The Halad Museum opened its doors and honoring Cabase and other awardees on February 2, 2010.

== Early life ==
Cabase was born in San Nicolas, Cebu City, to Roman Catholic parents, Sonsa (née Kabajar) and Ireneo Cabase. His father was an accordionist and a traveling musician with a Vaudeville group. Cabase was a child prodigy, learning to play piano on his own at 5 and learning guitar at age 6. Attending academic schools halted his self-education but at age 13 he was a guitarist, vocalist, and arranger for the local band of San Nicolas.

== Music career ==
In 1935 at the age of 15, Cabase became a member of the Cebu Swingmasters with his equally talented brothers Narding and Siux. His rapidly developing talents not only as a performer but as composer and arranger launched Cabase to the position of Bandleader at only 17 years of age.

In 1945, Cabase married his best friend, Priscilla Campogan at the end of the Japanese Occupation. Cabase organized the group Music Makers, together with his brother Siux. When the Music Makers disbanded, Cabase founded The Three Kings, which eventually evolved into the popular Vikings featuring Visayan singing stars: Stacs Huguete, Ramonito Del Rosario, Maning Aballe, and Art Maloy. The group disbanded in 1962. In 1963, Cabase founded The Sounds, a group of singing musicians and starred his daughter Amapola. He eventually turned over the leadership of the group to his daughter, and under his guidance, Amapola and the Sounds became the country’s biggest musical sensation. In 1972 his daughter Amapola joined a road tour of Hawaii, followed in 1973 by a stint at the Carlyle Hotel for the Philippines First Lady Imelda Marcos. With Amapola’s career firmly entrenched in the United States, Cabase and his wife, Sheila, joined their daughter and their group reunited at the Fairmont Hotel in San Francisco from 1977 to 1982.

== Legacy ==
Cabase composed close to a hundred songs (now considered Visayan classics) with Cebuano lyricist Saturio Alvarez-Villarino, also known as Toting Villarino, most notably: “Unsaon Ko,” “Patay’ng Buhi,” “Guihigugma Ko Ikaw,” “Carmen, Damgo Ko,” “Handumanan,” to name a few. Cabase's more recent compositions were co-written with his wife, lyricist - Sheila Campogan Cabase, most notably: “Awit Sa Damgo,” “Na-ibog Ako Kanimo,” “Unya Nahanaw Ka,” “Nahigwa-os,” Many of Cabase's compositions are considered classic Cebuano "serenades" in the Visayas.

== Discography ==
Visayan Songs:

- Unsaon Ko
- Patayng' Buhi
- Guihigugma Ko Ikaw
- Awit Sa Damgo
- Na-ibog Ako Kanimo
- Unya Nahanaw Ka
- Nahigwa-os
- Carmen, Damgo Ko
- Asa Padulong ang Gugma
- Kulibing
- Handumanan
- Handuma Intawon
- Gugma Sa Inahan
- Paradista
- Harana
- Guipukaw Mo
- Sa Among Kusog
- Lilongon Ko
- Iluom Ko Lamang
- Kanunay
- Sugilanon
- Harana
- Ang Mausab Dili Gayod Ako
- Guianod Ako
- Nagahilak Ako
- Bisan Anino Mo

English Songs

- If You'd Only Love Me
- It's Great To Be Young
- Tender Breeze
- Dream Melody
- Mother
- Complete Siete Palabras Collection
- Complete Misa Cantata in Visayan
- Ever Faithful
- A Beggar In The Hands Of Time
- Empty Dream
- Sunset In My Heart
- Again and Again
- Alone Again
- Forever Mine
- The Moon And A Memory

Other Languages

- Rhumba Cabase
- Sa Dulo Ng Ating Landas

Albums

- CD: Mahnee Cabase Compositions
- CD: Love Without A Name, Vocals: Amapola
