= Tess Uriza Holthe =

Filipino-American writer (born 1966)

- Born: 1966 (age 59–60); San Francisco, California
- Education: Golden Gate University
- Occupations: Writer; Accountant
- Writing career
- Notable work: When the Elephants Dance
- Website: tessurizaholthe.net

Tess Uriza Holthe is a Filipino-American writer who was born and raised in the Bernal Heights neighborhood of San Francisco and is best known for her nationally bestselling novel When the Elephants Dance.

== Biography ==
Holthe graduated from Golden Gate University in 1996 with a degree in accounting. While working full-time as an accountant, she began writing her first novel When the Elephants Dance during lunch breaks, evenings, and weekends.

When the Elephants Dance is inspired in part by her father's experiences growing up in the Philippines during World War II.

== Bibliography ==
- The Five-Forty-Five To Cannes was published in 2007 and cited as an American Library Association Notable Book, as well as named a 2007 notable book by the San Francisco Chronicle.
- When the Elephants Dance was published in 2002 and won the National Best-seller award, crowned the #1 Bestseller by the San Francisco Chronicle, Book Sense Top Ten, Ingram Premier Pick, Barnes & Noble Discover, and Borders Original Voices Selection. The novel explores the retelling of supernatural tales based on indigenous Filipino mythology and Spanish-influenced novels, told from the perspective of a family hiding in a cellar during the last weeks of the Japanese occupation in the Philippines.
