= Pat Loika =

San Diego–based podcaster and photographer

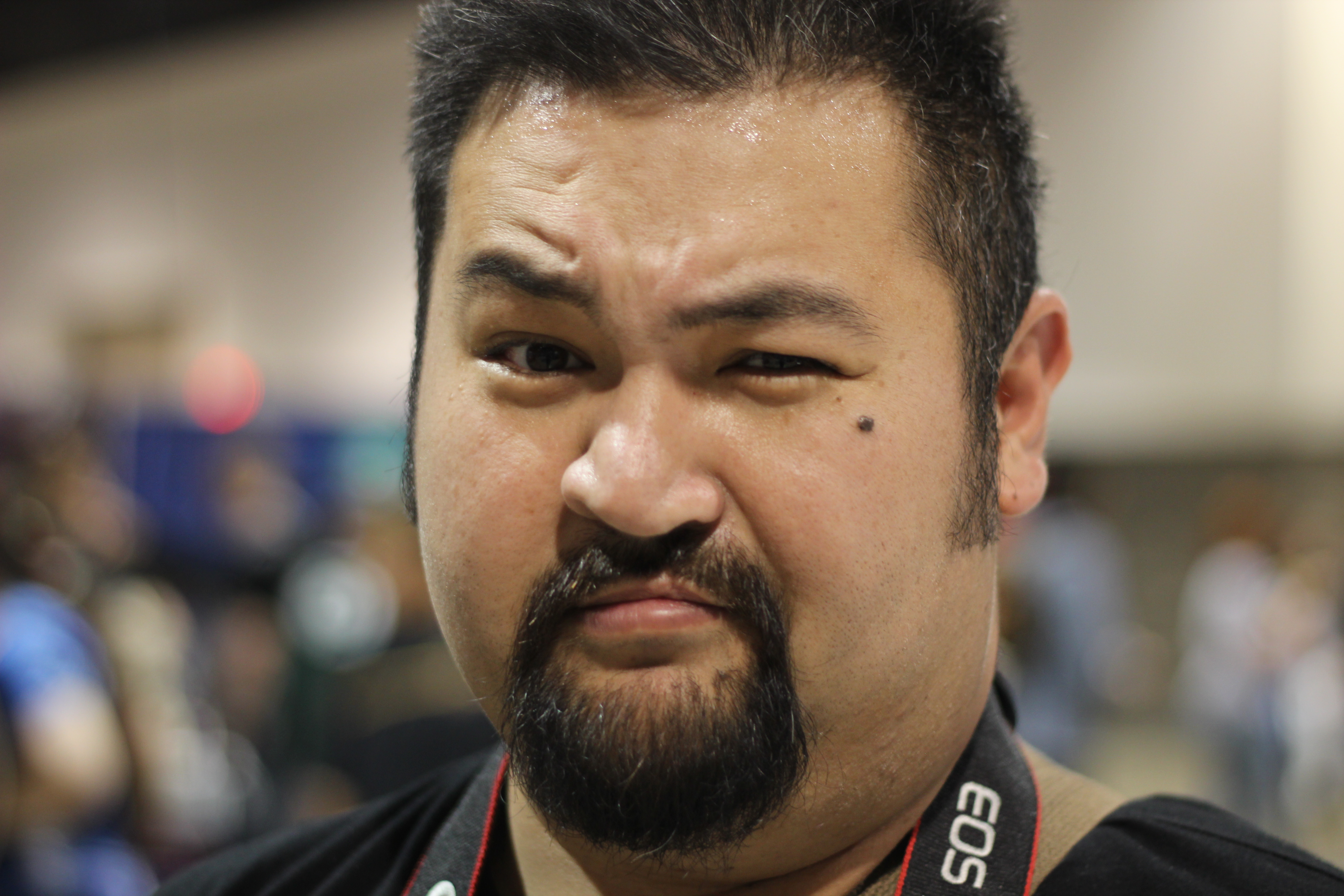
- Loika at Long Beach Comic Con in 2012
- Born: 1979 (age 46–47); Philippines
- Occupations: Podcaster, photographer
- Known for: Podcasts, Photography

Pat Loika (born 1979) is a San Diego–based podcaster and photographer. He has created artwork for comics and featured in discussions about the comic book industry. His photography, focusing largely on cosplay, has been featured in magazines and broadcasts.

== Biography ==
Born in the Philippines in 1979, Loika moved to San Diego after his mother married a United States Navy officer in 1996. During his high school years Chris Maze, Loika's other best friend, described Loika as "quiet and reserved."

== Comics ==
Loika's affinity for comics began when his mother, who worked as a flight attendant, brought home Marvel cards from the United States. Loika would sneak out of school in order to read comic books. Later, Loika attended over 300 fan conventions, where he socialized with many comic book creators. Loika hosted a podcast titled Loikamania, where he would interview individuals involved in the comic industry, until it ended in 2016. BuzzFeed described his efforts in interviewing comic book creators as being "the closest thing comics has to an Oprah". After completing his final episode of Loikamania, Loika hosted a panel at San Diego Comic-Con. Loika, had previously been a panelist at the same convention in 2014.

During the first decade of the 21st century, after having his artwork reviewed by Marvel, Loika went on to write a western story in Image Comics' Outlaw Territory. The project involved Garry Henderson and Michael Woods.

In early July 2013, Comic Book Resources featured his collection on a segment called "Shelf Porn". Later that month, Loika was stuck in an elevator, tweeting about his experience. Bleeding Cool published an article about this event. Due to his efforts of being a booster in the comic book industry, Playboy Philippines interviewed Loika and published the interview in their July 2014 issue.

In addition to creating a podcast, Loika is also a photographer. His photographs, largely of cosplay, have been featured or utilized on Vanity Fair, The Mary Sue, Nerdist, and MTV.

=== Appearances in fiction ===
Pat's name appears in a fictional comic within the comic story, as a creator on 'Ultimate Amazing Fantasy #14' in Ultimate Comics Spider-Man vol. 2, #26.

Also in the Ultimate Marvel universe, Pat appears in a scene with Steve Rogers before he becomes Captain America, in Ultimate Origins #2.

Pat appears in multiple issues of Uncanny X-Men (2013 series), in issue 15, and as a SHIELD agent in issues 26 and 28.

He eventually graduates from SHIELD to SWORD agent as he appears in Captain Marvel (2016 series) issue 1, taking photos of Captain Marvel and Puck.

He would also appear in Tom King and Mitch Gerads' Vertigo series, The Sheriff of Babylon in issue 5 sharing a scene with a cat.

Loika's podcast, Loikamania also gets a cameo in a subway scene from X-Men (2013 series) issue 14.
