= When the Elephants Dance =

When the Elephants Dance is a historical fiction novel written by Tess Uriza Holthe and published in 2002. It is set in February, 1945 in the Philippines during the final week of the battle for control between the Americans and the Japanese during World War II. The story is divided into four parts, each told from a character's perspective and detailing events that occur in the moments leading up to the Japanese surrender. Within each part are multiple short stories that contain mythological elements and important themes of unity and loyalty and the downfall of innocence.

== Historical context ==
The Philippines is an archipelago located southeast of China and north of Indonesia. In the late 13th century, Arab traders introduced Islam to the Philippines and the religion spread throughout the country between the 14th and 15th centuries. In 1521, Spanish colonizers led by Ferdinand Magellan “discovered” the Philippines while trying to circumvent the world and named it after King Philip II. However, it was not formally colonized until forty-four years later when Miguel Lopez de Legaspi began settling in Cebu. The Spaniah Empire sent missionaries, including the Jesuits, to spread Catholicism and used the country as a strategic refueling stop for trading with Mexico and China. The Spanish pushed Muslims to the southern region of the country, known as Mindanao.

Spanish colonial rule continued for nearly 300 years until the United States won possession with its victory in the Spanish–American War in 1898. In her introduction to When the Elephants Dance, Uriza Holthe writes that “Public schools were opened with American, Spanish, and Filipino teachers. The Spanish language was kept as a means of communication, but the Spanish legal system was exchanged for the American system.” The United States placed troops on the archipelago and established a military government.

From 1899 to 1902, the Philippine–American War for Philippine independence ensued. It ended with an American victory, but nationalism continued rising. Political organizations and parties developed as a bicameral legislature that consisted of a popularly-elected Philippine Assembly and US-appointed Philippine Commission oversaw the country.

On December 7, 1941, Japan bombed Pearl Harbor and the following morning attacked the Philippines. General Douglas MacArthur of the United States retreated and declared Manila an open city. Japan continued to bomb the city and forced 70,000 Filipino and American troops on the Bataan Death March. The Japanese continued bombing until MacArthur surrendered on May 6, 1942, and retreated to Australia, thus leaving the Philippine people to fend for themselves. The Japanese arrived with propaganda that they were merely ending Western imperialism as they destroyed American books and burned American schools. In October 1944, MacArthur returned to the Philippines with more troops and supplies. On September 2, 1945, Japan surrendered, and the Philippines gained independence on July 4, 1946, with the Treaty of Manila between the United States and the Philippines.

== Plot summary ==
=== Part 1 ===
The book begins in February, 1945 and is told from the perspective of thirteen-year-old Alejandro Karangalan. Alejandro and his ten-year-old brother Rodrigo are on their way home from exchanging cigarettes for medicine when they are corralled by Japanese soldiers. The soldiers are searching for the Filipino who murdered their officer, and it appears that Alejandro's friend Nesto is the culprit. Alejandro is suspended by his thumbs along with other civilians and interrogated while soldiers take away Domingo Matapang behind the woods and shoot him. Alejandro is ultimately freed as the Japanese admire his unwillingness to reveal the murderer's identity. Upon returning home to the family cellar where a total of thirteen family friends coexist, he learns that his sister, Isabelle, has been missing since the morning. The morning after, Carlito, Roman, and Mang Pedro leave in search of food. Roman and Pedro return with little success, but Carlito is nowhere to be found.

=== Part 2 ===
The second part of the novel is told from Isabelle's point of view. Isabelle, Alejandro's older sister, is hiding behind a bush when she sees Domingo shot by the Japanese soldiers. Despite being injured, Domingo overtakes the soldiers and then sees Isabelle and asks for help. She ultimately agrees to assist him in returning to his guerilla camp headquarters, where she meets Domingo's mistress Nina and honorary son. After meeting with his troops, Domingo takes Isabelle back to the Karangalan cellar, but his wound becomes infected on the way home. Isabelle sprints away from Domingo when he cries out in pain to distract Japanese soldiers from the noise, but they order her to follow them. She is then taken to a hotel in Manila to serve as a comfort woman, where she runs into Feliciano, a family friend who is a Japanese sympathizer, or Makapili, who hides her in a separate room. Unfortunately, Isabelle is discovered and sexually assaulted by three soldiers. Feliciano returns and brings Isabelle back to cellar, where he is called a traitor and attacked by Domingo. After the dust settles, Aling Ana tells Isabelle a story to help her find peace within herself and prevent bitterness from engulfing her.

=== Part 3 ===
The third part of the story is told from Domingo's point of view. Domingo decides to not kill Feliciano as he needs him to circumvent Japanese guards in order to find his son. Throughout the journey for his son, who has been captured along with three members of the cellar inhabitants, Domingo contemplates his failing marriage with Lorna, strained relationship with his son, and his bond with Nina. Upon prompting by Feliciano, Domingo discusses and thinks about his father, who is a wealthy senator and Japanese sympathizer that rejects Domingo because he is his illegitimate son. Domingo's view of love and family are skewed as there is a constant battle between blood family and the feeling of true family inside of him. Once the two locate the missing group members, Feliciano presents Domingo as his prisoner to the Japanese guards. Feliciano then kills the guards, and the group returns to the cellar. Soon after, Japanese soldiers find the cellar, burn it down, and order the inhabitants to begin marching towards Manila, which is currently being bombed by the Americans. Everyone is ushered into a warehouse with other Filipino prisoners, where Lorna begs Domingo to stay and not return to the guerilla fighters. Mang Pedro tells a story about his experience learning the importance of family and not wasting it. Ultimately, Domingo decides to leave and finds that Nina was at the warehouse planning his rescue. They return to the guerilla camp in the mountains, only to be attacked by the Japanese the day after their arrival. Nina is badly wounded in action, and Domingo is forced to shoot her to end her suffering.

=== Part 4 ===
The final part of the novel is told by Alejandro, who is still held captive in the warehouse along with several other Filipinos. The bombing in Manila intensifies and most of the Japanese soldiers are fighting outside. When the Japanese try to take Lorna's baby away from her, Lorna fights back and is stabbed several times. Soon after, the building begins burning down and everyone rushes to break through the locked doors until an American soldier opens it from the other side because Domingo told him civilians were inside. Everyone rushes out to find that the Americans have overcome the Japanese and taken back the Philippines. Domingo discovers that his wife, son, and infant were all killed in the chaos and collapses in sadness.

The surviving members of the warehouse are driven back to their homes on American jeeps. Everyone stays with Aling Ana, as her extravagant home was one of the few preserved in the war. The next day, everyone feasts and reunites with friends and family. Domingo, too haunted by the ghosts of his dead mistress, family, and guerilla fighters, announces his departure. The novel ends with Alejandro describing his gratitude for survival and pride for being a Filipino.
