= Craig Abaya =

American singer-songwriter

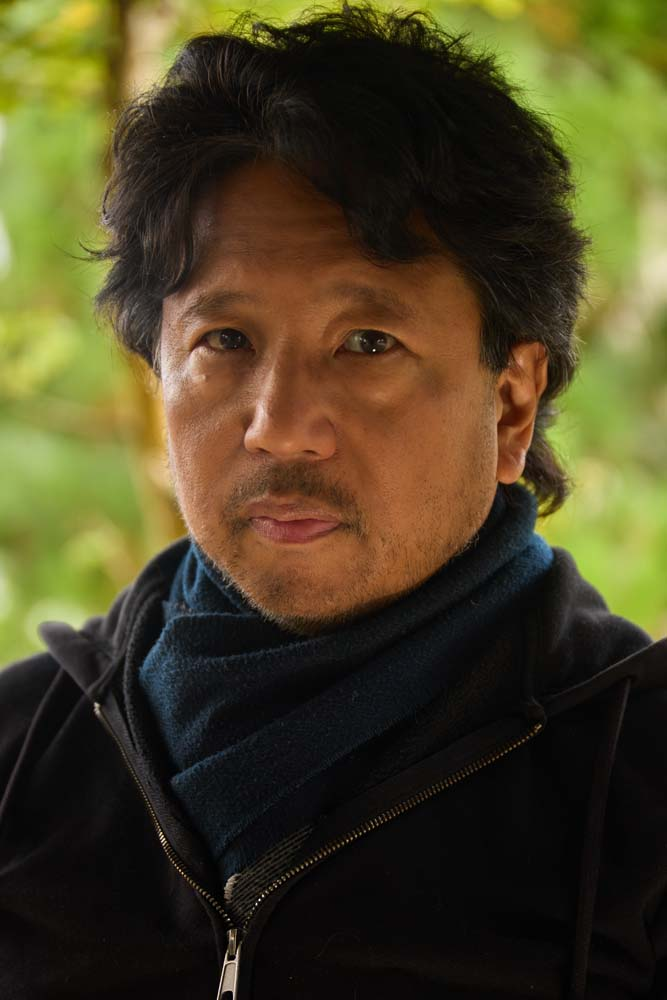
- Craig Abaya

Background information
- Born: Bernal Heights, San Francisco, California
- Occupations: Filmmaker, Musician, Songwriter, Photographer
- Website: abaya.com

Craig Abaya is an American multi-artist who served as director of Digital Media & Entertainment Programs for San Francisco State University College of Professional and Global Education from 2000 through 2014. He was the featured artist at Macworld/iWorld Expo in San Francisco, California where his film and photography were displayed in the gallery titled: "Craig Abaya: The Art of Rock and Roll from Analog to Digital."

== Early life ==
Abaya is a native of San Francisco's Bernal Heights neighborhood. He became involved in music during childhood, taking up the piano at age six, the drums at age eleven, and the guitar at age twelve. He became involved in film and photography at the age of nine.

At seventeen, Abaya enrolled at San Francisco State University where he proposed and earned a special major in multimedia, combining studies in film, audio, video, computers and electronics.

== Music and recording artist ==
Abaya is a singer and cites his main instruments as guitar, piano, and drums. He also took up recording at a young age, moving from 2- and 4-track analog tape to ADAT and eventually to DAWs (digital audio workstations). At 17, he formed his first professional band, the grunge/metal trio Apparition. At this time, he also wrote and performed music with the local church youth choir. After disbanding "Apparition," he founded the 4-piece group "The Basics" and later, "Abaya," in an attempt to merge his divergent musical interests. He has won songwriting awards in various genres, including 10 from Billboard Magazine.

== Filmmaker ==
Although he became involved in filmmaking at age 9, his true entree into the craft began 3 years later. After selling his rare copy of Famous Funnies #212 and financial support from his parents, Craig bought his first movie camera, which helped him earn him his first screen credit from, then, NBC affiliate, KRON-TV. His footage included the funeral procession of San Francisco Mayor, George Moscone.

== Educator ==
Abaya served as Director of Digital Media and Entertainment Departments and instructor at San Francisco State University College of Professional and Global Education from 2000-2015.

== Discography ==
=== Studio albums ===
- ‘’The Fine Art of Politics” (2009)
- ‘’One Bus to Mercy” (2019)
- ‘’Fashion Statement” (2022)

=== Singles ===
- “This Jail I Made” (2018)
- ‘’Truth” (2018)
- ‘’Will I Walk on Water” (2019)
- ‘’Behind Blue Eyes” (2020)
- ‘’Laze the Day Away” (2021)
- ‘’Q&A” DJ Qbert and Craig Abaya (2021)
- ‘’Topsy Turvy” (2022)
- ‘’Sex Sells” (2022)
- ‘’Living in Analogy” (2022)
- ‘’HATE” (2024)

=== Guest Appearances ===
- DJ Qbert “Bloom (Plantoids)” from the album Extraterrestria (2014) - song composition, lead and rhythm guitars, bass guitar

=== Musical Scores ===
- "Bridge School News" series (2008 -)
- "Retrogirl" (2016)
- "Retrogirl 2" (2017)
- “Ambush” (2017)
- "Cortical Visual Impairment" mini series (2020)
- "Communication with First Responders During Emergencies and Disasters" (2021)
- "Clearly Through the Mist" (2023)

== Filmography ==
Directed features
Year	Title	Credits
2002	‘’Bruce Hornsby Live at Villa Montalvo"	Producer/Director
2003	"Joan Armatrading: All the Way from America”	Producer/Director
2006-2020	‘’The Stern Grove Festival Videos” (series)	Producer/Director, Camera Operator, Editor, Music Mixer
2008-2019	‘’Bridge School News” (series)	Producer/Director, Editor, Composer
2015-2016	‘’Marissa Anne the Media Fan”	Producer/Director, Writer, Camera Operator, Editor
2016	‘’Retrogirl”	Producer/Director, Writer, Camera Operator, Editor, Composer
2016	‘’If I Had a Twin”	Producer/Director, Writer, Camera Operator, Editor, Composer
2016	"Ambush"	Director of Photography, Camera Operator, Line Producer, Editor, Visual Effects, Composer
2017	‘’Retrogirl 2”	Producer/Director, Writer, Camera Operator, Editor, Composer
2018	‘’The Nutcracker”	Director, Camera Operator
2018	"The Bammies Reunion Concert"	Producer, Director, Editor
2019	‘’Restless Soul”	Producer/Director, Camera Operator, Editor, Composer
2020	‘’Cortical Visual Impairment” (mini series)	Director, Editor
2020	‘’Stern Grove - Best of the Fest" (mini series)	Producer/Director, Camera Operator, Editor
2020	"Behind Blue Eyes"	Producer/Director/Editor
2021	"Regret"	Producer/Director, Camera Operator, Editor, Composer
2021	"Will I Walk on Water"	Producer/Director, Camera Operator, Editor, Composer
2021	"Q&A"	Producer/Director, Camera Operator, Editor, Composer
2021	"Laze the Day Away"	Producer/Director, Editor, Composer
2021	"Communication with First Responders During Emergencies and Disasters"	Editor, Composer
2022	"Thank You"	Producer/Director, Camera Operator, Editor
2022	"From the Ground Up"	Producer/Director, Writer, Editor
2023	"Clearly Through the Mist"	Producer/Director, Editor, Composer
2024	"Shout to God with Cries of Gladness"	Producer/Director, Camera Operator, Editor
