= Jeremy Castro Baguyos =

Filipino academic (born 1968)

Jeremy Castro Baguyos (born 1968 in Quezon City, Philippines) is a musician-researcher specializing in the realization of live interactive computer music. Based at the University of Nebraska at Omaha (USA), he is a Professor of Music.

His most notable contributions to the field are in the area of live performance combined with interactive computer technology. For the state of Nebraska (USA), Baguyos established the state's first interactive computer music ensemble, Ensemble A.M.I. (Artificial Music Initiative), in conjunction with its first and only electronic music festival featuring interactive computer music, Virtual Music Week. For his own instrument, the double bass, he was one of the early practitioners of interactive computer music performance on the double bass. Inspired by the early electronic pioneers such as Robert Black and Bertram Turetzky and building on foundational studies at the Indiana University Jacobs School of Music, Baguyos studied computer music at the Peabody Conservatory of Johns Hopkins University. It was at Peabody where he performed with the Peabody Computer Music Consort and collaborated with other students of computer music and established composers of computer music who shared his enthusiasm for the emerging art form. The result was the creation and performance, between 2002 and 2005, of some of the first significant repertoire for double bass and interactive electronics and probably the very first double bass repertoire to utilize the MSP extensions to the Max (software) digital audio programming language. It is for this reason, his work differed from the few earlier experiments in interactive computer music for double bass. His realizations in public presentation were implemented in software as opposed to reliance on the much more limited hardware-based synthesis. He performed repertoire that utilized real-time audio capture and DSP, the use of automation in live performance, and simulations of musical machine intelligence. His experimental work in this area has been recorded on the "Music From SEAMUS" annual CD series of the Society for Electroacoustic Music in the United States as well as his own solo CD released in 2005, "Uncoiled Oscillations," (OCD).

He appears frequently at notable academic conferences such as the International Computer Music Conference the Society for Electroacoustic Music in the United States., and the Seoul International Computer Music Festival. He is also the Principal Double Bassist of the Des Moines Metro Opera Summer Festival Orchestra, and has performed with the National Symphony (Washington, DC), the Kennedy Center Opera House Orchestra (Washington, DC), and the DC-based early music group the Washington Bach Consort.
