= Nelfa Querubin =

Ceramic artist

Nelfa Querubin (born 1941) is a ceramic artist from the Philippines living in the United States. She is also known as Nelfa Querubin-Tompkins.

The daughter of a fisherman, she was born in Concepcion, Iloilo and began working in clay in 1973. She came to the United States in 1985 and now lives in Golden, Colorado with her husband Michael Tompkins.

In 1980, she received the Cultural Center of the Philippines Thirteen Artists Award for her contributions to Philippine contemporary art. In 2015, she published A Passion for Clay, co-authored with Patrick Flores and Imelda Cajipe-Endaya.

Querubin has participated in a number of national and international exhibitions and has been the subject of three retrospectives. Her work is held in the collections of the University of the Philippines Visayas, the Kirkland Museum of Fine & Decorative Art in Denver, the Cultural Center of the Philippines, the Design Center of the Philippines and the Bangko Sentral ng Pilipinas, as well as various public and private collections.
