= Mail Order Brides (artist collaborative) =

Filipino-American artist trio

Mail Order Brides/M.O.B., “United We Sit,” (2003)

Mail Order Brides/M.O.B. is a Filipina American artist trio active since 1995. They are known for their use of humor and camp to explore issues of culture and gender. Founded in San Francisco by artists Eliza Barrios, Reanne Estrada, and Jenifer K. Wofford, the group's full name, Mail Order Brides/M.O.B., conflates a once-common stereotype of Filipina women as "mail order brides" with an acronym suggestive of an organized crime organization. The group has often been referred to in shorthand as "M.O.B.".

M.O.B. is known for their multidisciplinary projects which span video, photography, installation, sculpture and performance. Their work has been written about in critical publications including Decolonizing Culture (Anuradha Vikram), Pinay Power (Melinda de Jesus), Tropical Renditions (Christine Bacareza Balance), and Queering the Global Filipina Body (Gina K. Velasco).

M.O.B.’s work has been exhibited at the Asian Art Museum, the San Jose Museum of Art, the M.H. de Young Museum, Yerba Buena Center for the Arts, the Triton Museum of Art, the Chinese Culture Center, Kearny Street Workshop, the Luggage Store Gallery, and with the San Francisco Art Commission. They have presented performances for Southern Exposure art space, SOMArts, and at the 2018 Manila Biennale. Their film/video works have screened at the San Francisco International Asian American Film Festival, the International Gay and Lesbian Film Festival, the Mix Festival and the International Film Festival in Detroit.

== Projects ==
=== Market Street Art In Transit, 1998 ===
Mail Order Brides/M.O.B. created a series of posters for the San Francisco Art Commission’s Market Street Art In Transit project that were displayed along Market Street.

=== Museum Pieces: Bay Area Artists Consider the de Young, 1999 ===
Prior to the 2nd demolition and new construction of the M.H. de Young Museum in Golden Gate Park, guest curator Glen Helfand selected 18 site-specific works to be commissioned and included in the exhibition Museum Pieces that opened in 1999. As part of the exhibition the Mail Order Brides/M.O.B. surveyed visitors to learn how to make the museum space more inviting. Based on the responses they collected, the artists created an installation that incorporated decorating solutions for the museum.

=== Mail Order Bride of Frankenstein, 2002 ===
As part of their residency at the McColl Center for Visual Art in Charlotte, North Carolina the collaborative team filmed the karaoke horror film “Mail Order Bride of Frankenstein” (video) as part of their “Karaoke Trilogy” that included “What Now My Love” and “Holiday” (video). The work screened at the 23rd Annual SF International LGBT Film Festival; SF International Asian American Film Festival, Mix Festival (NY)

=== Always A BridesMaid Never A Bride, 2005 ===
Satirical project created in the wake of the same-sex marriage movement, offering "Professional Bridesmaid" services to those in need. The project consisted of performance, installation and infomercial-style videos created for Yerba Buena Center for The Arts' signature Bay Area Now 4 exhibition.

=== Manananggoogle, 2013-ongoing ===
Inspired by the Manananggal, a mythical, vampire-like creature from Philippine mythology, the collective created an installation and performance piece parodying corporate culture. This project was commissioned by curator Monica Ramirez-Montagut at the San Jose Museum of Art.

Manananggoogle later hosted an "Onboarding" performance event at the Global Fund for Women's office in San Francisco for Southern Exposure's 'Long Conversation' exhibition. Manananggoogle also hosted recruitment events in the San Diego/Tijuana border area, team-building activities at San Francisco's SOMArts, and in Intramuros, Philippines, as part of the Manila Biennale. Gallery presentations of Manananggoogle have also included exhibitions at the Wing Luke Museum (Seattle), Root Division (San Francisco) and Project 1A Space (Hong Kong).

=== Chatsilog Revisited, 2022 ===
A multimedia installation in video, sculpture and photography addressing MOB's connection to Filipino American artist Carlos Villa, subject of the San Francisco Asian Art Museum’s retrospective exhibition that year. Variations on the original installation have since been presented at the University of San Francisco's Thacher Gallery and the San Jose ICA.
