= Eldon Regua =

American army general (born 1955)

Eldon P. Regua
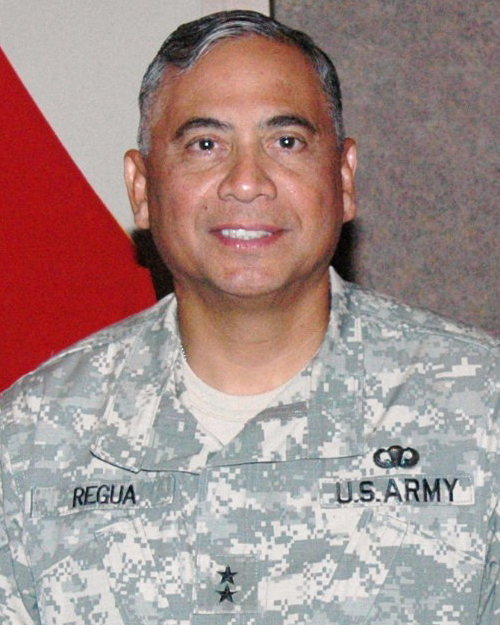
- MG Regua in September 2008
- Born: 1955 (age 70–71); San Jose, California
- Military career
- Allegiance: United States of America
- Branch: United States Army; *United States Army Reserve
- Service years: 1977-2013
- Rank: Major General
- Commands: 75th Division (Battle Command Training Division)
- Conflicts: Operation Iraqi Freedom; Operation Enduring Freedom - Afghanistan
- Awards: Distinguished Service Medal Legion of Merit with Oak Leaf Cluster Meritorious Service Medal with Silver Oak Leaf Cluster Army Commendation Medal Army Achievement Medal

Eldon Philip Regua (born 1955) is a retired major general in the United States Army Reserve, who last served as Deputy Commanding General/Chief of Staff (Wartime) (Individual Mobilization Augmentee) for Eighth United States Army headquartered in Yongsan, Korea, having just completed an assignment as Commanding General, 75th Division (Battle Command Training Division) in Houston, Texas in July 2011. As of 2010, he was the senior most active, or reserve, non-retired flag or general officer of Filipino American ethnicity. He is also half Mexican American ethnicity.

== Biography ==
Born and raised in San Jose, he grew up with his parents and four brothers and two sisters. His father Felipe (Philip), dropped out of school in the fifth grade, and became a Filipino agricultural laborer who emigrated from the Philippines in 1929. His mother Evangeline, a Mexican American, was born in El Paso, Texas met his father, in 1951. His family eventually settled in the Evergreen District of San Jose in 1968.

As a young boy he and his family and worked the fields picking prunes, walnuts, green beans and apricots also working in an apricot dry yard. In 1973 he graduated from Silver Creek High School. After high school he was admitted to Santa Clara University where he participated in the Army ROTC program and graduate in 1977 earning a B.S. in Commerce in accounting. Eventually he would go on and earn Master of business administration degree from Chapman University, and a Master of strategic studies degree from the United States Army War College. All four of his brothers would also go on to earn college degrees.

Following SCU, he became a newly commissioned officer in the Air Defense Artillery Branch, serving initially in Giessen, Germany during the Cold War after his Officer Basic Course at Fort Bliss. He would also work with a tactical evaluation team under Allied Air Forces Central Europe evaluating allied Improved Hawk units.

Following this stint on active duty, he joined the Army Reserve, being promoted several times, serving in multiple units to include 91st Division (Training Support), 63rd Regional Support Command, and the 104th Division (Institutional Training). He was briefly activated in support of Operation Iraqi Freedom during the first half of 2003, and oversaw certification of units heading downrange; this activation also fell under Operation Noble Eagle. His deactivation from active duty, in 2003, was connected to the selection as Chief of Staff and later approval of his promotion to brigadier general by then President George Bush, to the position of Assistant Division Commander (Operations) as well as Commanding General of the 104th Division from 2007 to 2008. He has visited in both Iraq and Afghanistan on several occasions.

He serves as vice president of US Army Programs for NextStep Technology, Regua recently served on the Secretary of the Army's Reserve Forces Policy Committee. Regua retired from the Army in 2013.

On December 2, 2020, President Donald Trump nominated Regua to be the next Representative of the United States to the Association of Southeast Asian Nations. On January 3, 2021, his nomination was returned to the President under Rule XXXI, Paragraph 6 of the United States Senate.
