= Roslynn Cobarrubias =

American presenter and musician (1980–2023)

- Also known as: DJ Roslynn, DJ Ros
- Born: Roslynn Alba Cobarrubias; March 12, 1980; Los Angeles, California, U.S.
- Died: November 19, 2023 (aged 43) Walnut, California, U.S.
- Occupations: Television presenter and producer, speaker, author, businesswoman, radio presenter and DJ
- Years active: 1999–2023

Roslynn Alba Cobarrubias (March 12, 1980 – November 19, 2023), known as DJ Roslynn and DJ Rose, was an American television presenter, producer, author, speaker, DJ, radio host, businesswoman, event producer and marketing executive. She was the co-founder of global talent discovery video platform, mydiveo, that was acquired by Engage:BDR for $7.4M in August 2016.

She founded Little B-Girl Clothing line and the boutique marketing agency, Third Floor Network. She hosted and co-produced "mydiveo LIVE" and cable network, MyxTV, which premiered on January 11, 2016. alongside TFC's 'Balitang America' with Cher Calvin.

Roslynn was a host at several globally live-streamed events including the Grammy/CBS 2010 red carpet live stream. In 2009, Roslynn was the co-host of the Alice in Wonderland "Almost Alice" concert broadcast. Most recently, she was featured in Billboard Magazine after co-producing a concert for Adweek 2011.

In 2009, she was named one of Billboard Magazine's "Top 30 Music Industry Professionals Under 30" with Spotify Founder Daniel Ek & Justin Bieber manager Scooter Braun. In 2007, Roslynn was featured in The Source Magazine "Power 30" with the MySpace.com Co-Founders, Chris DeWolfe & Tom Anderson alongside Diddy and Russell Simmons. In 2009, she was featured on the cover of the Filipino newspaper, the Asian Journal.
