= List of Chinese Americans =

This is a list of notable Chinese Americans, including both original immigrants who obtained American citizenship and their American descendants who have made exceptional contributions to various facets of American society.

To be included in this list, the person must have a Wikipedia article showing they are Chinese American or must have references showing they are Chinese American and are notable.

== Art and design ==
=== Architecture ===
- Poy Gum Lee (李錦沛) – Art Deco architect in New York City
- Roger Lee – Modernist architect in California and Hawaii
- Maya Lin (林瓔) – Minimalist architect (Vietnam Veterans Memorial)
- Liu Jipiao (刘既漂) – Art Deco architect and painter in China and later in U.S.
- I. M. Pei (貝聿銘) – Modernist architect based in New York City

=== Dance ===
- Goh Choo San (吴诸珊) – ballet dancer and choreographer
- Shen Wei (沈伟) – dancer, choreographer and visual artist; MacArthur fellow
- Fang-Yi Sheu (許芳宜) – principal dancer of the Martha Graham Dance Company

=== Fashion design ===
- Malan Breton (马兰·布莱顿) – fashion designer
- Luly Yang – fashion designer
- Angel Chang – fashion designer
- Monika Chiang – fashion designer
- Wenlan Chia (賈雯蘭) – fashion designer
- Doug Chiang (江道格) – movie designer and artist
- David Chu (朱欽騏) – co-founder of clothing company Nautica
- Diana Eng – fashion designer
- Joe Allen Hong – fashion designer for Neiman Marcus
- Jen Kao – fashion designer
- Jonathan Koon – fashion designer, business entrepreneur
- Derek Lam – fashion designer
- Phillip Lim – fashion designer
- Peter Mui – fashion designer, actor, and musician
- Mary Ping – fashion designer
- Peter Som – fashion designer
- Anna Sui (蕭志美) – fashion designer
- Vivienne Tam (谭燕玉) – fashion designer
- Yeohlee Teng – fashion designer
- Alexander Wang (王大仁) – fashion designer
- Kaisik Wong – fashion designer
- Vera Wang (王薇薇) – fashion designer
- Jason Wu (吳季剛) – fashion designer
- Joe Zee – creative director of Elle magazine; host of fashion TV series All on the Line

=== Literature ===
- Bette Bao Lord (包柏漪) – writer, novelist
- Eileen Chang (张爱玲, a.k.a. 张煐) – writer
- Kang-i Sun Chang (孫康宜) – writer and literary scholar
- Lan Samantha Chang – writer; director of the Iowa Writer's Workshop
- Victoria Chang – poet, children's writer, and essayist
- Ted Chiang (姜峯楠) – speculative fiction writer
- Frank Chin (趙健秀) – novelist, playwright, and essayist
- Marilyn Chin (陈美玲) – poet
- Ben Fee (张恨棠/木云) – writer and labor organizer
- David Henry Hwang (黃哲倫) – playwright
- Gish Jen (任璧蓮) – writer, novelist
- Ha Jin (哈金) – novelist, winner of the National Book Award for Waiting
- Maxine Hong Kingston – novelist, The Woman Warrior
- R. F. Kuang (匡灵秀) – fantasy novelist, The Poppy War
- Jean Kwok – writer, novelist
- Edward Michael Law-Yone – writer, journalist; father of Wendy Law-Yone
- Wendy Law-Yone – writer
- Chin Yang Lee - writer
- Gus Lee (李健孫) – writer
- Carolyn Lei-Lanilau – writer
- Yiyun Li (李翊雲) – winner of the 2006 PEN/Hemingway Award
- Ed Lin (林景南) – writer, first author to win three Asian American Literary Awards
- Tao Lin (林韜) – writer
- Eric Liu (劉柏川) – author and speechwriter for former US President Bill Clinton
- Malinda Lo – writer, young adult novels, Ash
- David Wong Louie (雷祖威) – writer
- Marie Lu (陸希未) – writer
- Ling Ma – writer, Severance
- Adeline Yen Mah (馬嚴君玲) – author and physician
- William Marr (馬為義,非馬) – engineer, poet, translator, and artist
- Chanel Miller – artist and author of Know My Name
- Anchee Min (閔安琪) – author, Red Azalea
- Celeste Ng (伍綺詩) – writer, novelist
- Lisa See – writer
- Sui Sin Far (水仙花) – late 19th/early 20th century Chinese-English American author and journalist
- Arthur Sze - poet
- Mai-mai Sze - writer and artist
- Amy Tan (譚恩美) – best-selling author, The Joy Luck Club
- Jade Snow Wong (黃玉雪) – writer
- Shawn Wong – novelist, Homebase, American Knees; writer; professor
- Timothy C. Wong (黃宗泰) – sinologist, translator, and literary theorist
- Xu Xi (許素細) – English language novelist based in Hong Kong
- Geling Yan (严歌苓) – novelist and screenwriter
- Gene Luen Yang (楊謹倫) – graphic novelist, whose book American Born Chinese was the first graphic novel to be nominated for a National Book Award
- Laurence Yep (叶祥添) – two-time winner of the Newbery Honor
- Connie Young Yu – writer, historian, lecturer, and 2016 "Woman of the Year" California Senate District 13
- Judy Yung – writer
- Kat Zhang – author of young adult and middle grade novels
- Jenny Zhang – essayist, poet, novelist
- Jenny Tinghui Zhang – novelist

=== Theater ===
- Ping Chong (張家平) – contemporary theater director
- Dan Kwong – playwright
- BD Wong – Tony Award-winning actor, M Butterfly, Law & Order: Special Victims Unit

=== Visual arts ===
- Bernice Bing – painter
- Cai Guo-Qiang (蔡國強) – artist and gunpowder works designer
- Ernie Chan – comic book artist/inker for Marvel Comics and DC Comics.
- Ching Ho Cheng – Cuban–born contemporary artist
- Alan Chin – multidisciplinary artist
- Mel Chin – artist
- Lenore Chinn – realist painter
- Han Hsiang-ning (韓湘寧) – painter
- Hon Chew Hee – Chinese–Hawaiian painter
- Tessa Hulls - artist
- Haven Lin-Kirk – artist and designer, Dean of the USC Gayle Garner Roski School of Art and Design
- Hung Liu (劉虹) – painter
- Reagan Louie – American photographer
- Seong Moy – painter and printmaker
- Mimi So – jewelry designer
- May Sun – artist, public art
- Fan Tchunpi – painter, ceramicist
- Frank Wong – dioramist
- James Wong Howe (黃宗霑) – nominated for ten Academy Awards for cinematography, won twice (1955, 1963)
- Marjorie Wong Hee – Chinese–Hawaiian painter, teacher
- Martin Wong – painter
- Tyrus Wong (黃齊耀) – artist
- Frank Wu – science-fiction illustrator
- Xu Bing – artist
- Zhao Suikang - artist

== Business ==
=== Financial ===
- Gerald Chan (陳樂宗) – son of T.H. Chan, property investments
- Ida Liu (劉宏敏) – Global Head of Citi Private Bank
- Tim Chen – co-founder and CEO of NerdWallet
- Yan Huo (霍焱) – co-founder of Capula Investment Management, 8th largest hedge fund in Europe by assets
- Alfred Lin (林君叡) – venture capitalist at Sequoia Capital
- Ken Lin – founder and CEO of Credit Karma
- Norman Liu (柳澈漯) – CEO and president of GECAS (2008–2015)
- Look Tin Eli (陸潤卿) – co-founder of the Canton Bank of San Francisco (1907-1926) and one of the prime movers in the rebuilding of Chinatown after the 1906 quake
- Li Lu (李录) – hedge fund manager and founder and chairman of Himalaya Capital
- Dominic Ng (吴建民) – CEO and president of East West Bank (1992– )
- Lou Pai (白露龍) – CEO of Enron Xcelerator, a venture capital division of Enron
- Donald Tang – former vice-chairman of Bear Stearns
- Oscar Tang (唐騮千) – financier and philanthropist
- Gerald Tsai (蔡至勇) – financier, former chairman and CEO of Primerica
- Gary Wang – co-founder of the collapsed cryptocurrency exchange FTX
- Mun Charn Wong (黃門贊) – former executive of Transamerica Corporation
- Peng Zhao (赵鹏) – CEO of Citadel Securities

=== Food ===
- Roger H. Chen (陳河源) – founder of Tawa Supermarket Inc., also known as 99 Ranch Market
- Andrew Cherng (程正昌) – co-founder of Panda Express
- Bob Chinn – owner of Bob Chinn's Crab House, highest grossing restaurant in America
- Johnny Kan – founder of Kan's Restaurant
- Ping Tom (譚繼平) – Chicago-based food industry businessman; uncle of Lauren Tom

=== Industrial ===
- Ting Tsung Chao – founder of The Chao Group and Westlake Chemical
- Albert Chao – co-founder of Westlake Chemical, son of Ting Tsung Chao
- James Yuan Chao – chair of the Westlake Chemical Corporation, son of Ting Tsung Chao
- Allen Chao – founder of Allergan, plc pharmaceutical and medical device co.
- David T. Hon – founder and CEO of Dahon bicycle co.
- Noel Lee – founder and CEO of Monster Cable
- Cyrus Tang – scrap metal and furniture magnate

=== Internet ===
- Fred Chang – founder of Newegg
- Pehong Chen – founder of Gain Technology and Broadvision
- Perry Chen – co-founder of Kickstarter
- Steve Chen – co-founder of YouTube
- Ben Chiu – founder of KillerApp.com
- Tracy Chou – Project Include, former Pinterest and Quora engineer
- Daniel Ha – co-founder of Disqus
- Tony Hsieh (謝家華) – co-founder of LinkExchange, later CEO of Zappos online shoe store
- Chris Hulls - co-founder of Life360
- Jameson Hsu – co-founder and CEO of Mochi Media
- Justin Kan – co-founder Twitch
- Kai-Fu Lee – founding president of Google China
- Ellen Pao – Reddit's CEO from 2014 to 2015, filed gender and race discrimination lawsuit against Perkins and lost
- Ben Silbermann – co-founder and CEO of Pinterest
- Greg Tseng – co-founder and CEO of Tagged
- Yishan Wong – CEO of Reddit (2012–2014); director of engineering of Facebook (2005–2010)
- Jerry Yang – co-founder of NASDAQ-100 component Yahoo!

=== Technology ===
- John S. Chen (程守宗) – CEO of BlackBerry; former CEO of Sybase
- Steve Chen (陳世卿) – founder and CEO of Galactic Computing
- James Chu – founder, CEO and chairman of ViewSonic, one of the largest computer monitor brands
- Alfred Chuang (庄思浩) – co-founder BEA Systems (acquired by Oracle in 2008)
- Weili Dai (戴伟立) – co-founder of Marvell Technology Group
- Ping Fu (傅苹) – co-founder of Geomagic
- Ming Hsieh (謝明) – co-founder Cogent Systems (sold to 3M in 2009)
- Jensen Huang (黃仁勳) – co-founder and former CEO of NASDAQ-100 component NVIDIA
- Kai Huang – co-founder of Guitar Hero franchise
- Robert T. Huang – founder of Fortune 500 company Synnex
- David Ji – founded Apex Digital
- Min Kao (高民環) – co-founder of Garmin
- David Lam (林杰屏) – founder of Lam Research
- Deb Liu – CEO of Ancestry.com
- Patrick Soon-Shiong (黄馨祥) – founder of Abraxis BioScience and NantHealth
- Lisa Su (蘇姿豐) – CEO and president of NASDAQ-100 component Advanced Micro Devices
- David Sun (孫大衛) – co-founder and COO of Kingston Technologies
- Sehat Sutardja (周秀文) – co-founder of Marvell Technology Group
- Lip-Bu Tan (陈立武) – president and CEO of Cadence Design Systems
- Victor Tsao (曹英偉) – co-founder of Linksys (sold to Cisco Systems)
- John Tu (杜紀川) – co-founder of Kingston Technologies
- Alexandr Wang – founder and CEO of Scale AI
- An Wang (王安) – co-founder of Wang Laboratories
- Charles Wang (王嘉廉) – founder of CA Technologies, owner of the New York Islanders
- William Wang (王蔚) – founder and CEO of Vizio
- Ken Xie (谢青) – founder of Fortinet and NetScreen (acquired by Juniper Networks in 2004)
- Bing Yeh (葉炳輝) – founder of Silicon Storage Technology and Greenliant Systems
- Eric Yuan (袁征) – founder and CEO of Zoom
- Min Zhu (朱敏) – co-founder of WebEx (sold to Cisco Systems)

=== Other ===
- Sam Chang – New York real estate and hotel developer
- James S.C. Chao – New York shipping magnate and father of Elaine Chao
- John Chuang – co-founder and CEO of staffing consultancy Aquent
- Andy Fang – co-founder of DoorDash
- Lew Hing – shipping, hotel, and canning tycoon
- Andrea Jung (鍾彬嫻) – Chair of Avon
- Christine Poon – business executive at Bristol Myers Squib and Johnson & Johnson, former dean of Ohio State University Fisher College of Business
- Stanley Tang – co-founder of DoorDash
- Tony Xu (徐迅) – co-founder of DoorDash

== Entertainment ==
- Stephen Chao – media executive
- Dan Lin – Hollywood film producer and former SVP at Warner Bros.
- Mynette Louie – producer and co-founder of Gamechanger Films
- John J. Sie – founder of Starz Inc.
- Andrea Wong – president of International Production for Sony Pictures Television and president of International for Sony Pictures Entertainment

=== Actors ===
- Awkwafina (林家珍) – actress and rapper
- Tyson Beckford – model and actor
- Ross Butler - actor
- Chloe Bennet (汪可盈) – actress and singer
- T. V. Carpio – actress and singer
- Tina Huang — stage, television actress
- Tia Carrere – actress, singer
- Flora Chan (陳慧珊) – actress
- JuJu Chan – actress
- Michael Paul Chan - actor
- Emily Chang - actress
- Louis Ozawa Changchien – actor
- Rosalind Chao – actress
- Zoë Chao – actress and writer
- Fala Chen – actress
- Hank Chen – actor and comedian
- Joan Chen (陳冲) – actress, The Last Emperor, director
- Lynn Chen – actress, Saving Face
- Kevin Cheng (鄭嘉穎) – actor and singer
- Cheng Pei-pei (鄭佩佩) – actress, known for films Come Drink with Me and Crouching Tiger, Hidden Dragon
- Karin Anna Cheung – actress, Angela, in Quentin Lee's feature film The People I've Slept With (2009)
- Feodor Chin – actor, writer, director
- Lori Tan Chinn – actress
- Annabel Chong – adult film actress
- Peter Chong – film and stage actor
- Tommy Chong, Canadian-American comedian, actor, writer, director, activist, and musician, part of comedy duo Cheech & Chong
- China Chow – actress, model
- Kelsey Chow – actress
- Michaela Conlin – actress
- Auliʻi Cravalho – actress and singer
- Darren Criss – Broadway and television actor, singer and songwriter
- Tiffany Espensen - actress
- Roger Fan – actor
- James Hong – actor and director
- George Hu (胡宇威) – actor
- Kelly Hu – actress
- Madison Hu – actress, Bizaardvark
- Celina Jade – actress, singer and martial artist
- Malese Jow – actress and singer on Unfabulous and The Vampire Diaries
- Archie Kao – actor and model
- Lawrence Kao - actor
- Matthew Yang King - actor
- Michelle Krusiec – actress
- Nancy Kwan – first Chinese-born star in Western cinema
- Brandon Lee (李國豪) – actor, son of Bruce Lee
- Bruce Lee (李小龍) – kung fu actor, son of Lee Hoi-chuen
- Jason Scott Lee – actor
- Michelle Lee – actress, martial artist and stuntwoman
- Peyton Elizabeth Lee - actress
- Shannon Lee (李香凝) – actress, and daughter of Bruce Lee
- Kaylani Lei – pornographic actress
- Al Leong - actor and stuntman
- Ken Leung – actor, Lost, X-Men: The Last Stand
- Telly Leung - actor and singer
- James Hiroyuki Liao – actor
- David Lim — actor
- Julia Ling (林小微) – actress, Chuck
- Dyana Liu – actress
- Lucy Liu (刘玉玲) – actress, Charlie's Angels, Kill Bill
- Liu Yifei – actress and singer
- John Lone – actor, most notable for his role as Puyi in The Last Emperor
- Jodi Long – actress
- Keye Luke – actor
- Tzi Ma (馬泰) – actor
- Byron Mann – actor, notable for playing the role of Ryu in Street Fighter
- Marie Matiko – actress
- Meiling Melançon – actress
- Matthew Moy – actor, 2 Broke Girls, most notable for the voice of Lars Barriga (Steven Universe)
- Olivia Munn – actress, model and television personality
- Irene Ng – actress, played the title character in Nickelodeon's The Mystery Files of Shelby Woo
- Melissa Ng – actress
- Haing S. Ngor – actor; won an Oscar for Best Supporting Actor in The Killing Fields
- Julia Nickson-Soul – actress, most notable for playing the role of Co-Bao in Rambo: First Blood Part II
- Jimmy Ouyang (歐陽萬成) – actor, writer and comedian
- Will Pan (潘瑋柏) – singer and songwriter
- Janel Parrish – actress and singer
- Ke Huy Quan – actor and stunt choreographer; played Short Round in Indiana Jones and the Temple of Doom
- Chester See – YouTube personality, musician, and Broadway actor.
- Ivan Shaw – actor
- Freda Foh Shen - actress
- Parry Shen – actor
- Robin Shou (仇雲波) – actor, stuntman, martial artist
- Harry Shum, Jr. (岑勇康) – actor, dancer, and singer in Glee and Shadowhunters
- Soo Yong (岑勇) – Hollywood and television actress.
- Kaiji Tang (唐凯吉) – voice actor
- Will Tiao (刁毓能) – actor and producer
- Jennifer Tilly – actress, Bound (born in California)
- Meg Tilly – actress
- Chuti Tiu – actress, Desire, 24, Dragnet, Beautiful, The Specials; former America's Junior Miss (first non-Caucasian winner)
- Kiana Tom – actress, television host, and exercise instructor
- Lauren Tom – actress, The Joy Luck Club, "Julie" on Friends
- Jessika Van – actress, singer, portrays "Becca" on MTV's Awkward
- Garrett Wang – actor in Star Trek: Voyager
- Ming-Na Wen (溫明娜) – Macanese-born actress, ER, Mulan
- Samantha Win - actress, martial artist, stuntwoman and wushu taolu athlete
- Anna May Wong (黃柳霜) – first female Asian-American star of the screen
- Grace Wong (王君馨) – actress
- Michael Wong (王敏德) – actor
- Russell Wong (王盛德) – actor
- Victor Wong (黃自強) – actor
- Constance Wu (吳恬敏) – actress
- Daniel Wu – actor
- Jade Wu – actress, screenwriter, director
- Kevin Wu (吳凱文) – YouTube star, once #1 all-time most subscribed comedian
- Leonard Wu – actor, producer and writer
- Bowen Yang – actor and writer, Saturday Night Live
- Welly Yang – actor and artist
- Michelle Ye (葉璇) – actress
- Kelvin Han Yee – actor
- Gwendoline Yeo – musician and actress
- Suzie Yeung – voice actress
- Keone Young – actor
- Eugenia Yuan (原麗淇) – actress and daughter of Cheng Pei-pei
- Catalina Yue – actress, singer, model
- Victor Sen Yung – actor, portrayed Hop Sing in Bonanza
- Nan Zhang (张楠) – actress, Gossip Girl

=== Directors ===
- Arvin Chen – director and screenwriter
- Tze Chun – writer, director
- Esther Eng – director
- Dayyan Eng - writer, producer, director
- Ang Lee – Academy Award-winning director
- Quentin Lee (李孟熙) – Canadian / American director, known for gay Asian stories
- Justin Lin – director, Better Luck Tomorrow, The Fast and the Furious: Tokyo Drift, Fast & Furious
- Freida Lee Mock – Academy Award-winning documentary filmmaker and co-founder of the American Film Foundation
- David Ren – film director, Shanghai Kiss
- Wayne Wang – Hollywood director; won the Golden Shell
- Ruby Yang – film director
- Jessica Yu – Academy Award-winning documentary filmmaker; film and television director

=== Musicians ===
- Jin Au-yeung – rapper, songwriter, actor
- Carmit Bachar – singer and member of the Pussycat Dolls
- Baiyu – singer, songwriter, actress, mtvU VJ
- Foxy Brown – rapper
- Dennis Ruowei Cao (曹偌伟) – a.k.a. One Child Policy, electronic musician
- Jaycee Chan – Hong Kong singer-songwriter, actor
- Robert Chen – violinist, concertmaster of Chicago Symphony Orchestra
- Chi Cheng – bassist of alternative metal band, Deftones
- Andrew Chou – member of hip-hop group Machi
- Chou Wen-chung - composer
- Dawen – singer, songwriter
- Leah Dizon – model and singer
- Khalil Fong – singer, songwriter
- Nichkhun Buck Horvejkul – singer and rapper member of the K-pop group, 2PM
- Hao Huang (pianist), composer, writer and professor at Scripps College
- Lucia Hwong – composer, musician, known for ethereal music and pipa (Chinese lute)
- Jon Jang – jazz pianist, composer, band leader
- Kelis – singer 1/4 Chinese
- Fei Xiang (费翔) – a.k.a. Kris Phillips, pop singer and theater actor
- Larissa Lam – singer-songwriter, television host, music executive, film director
- Chihchun Chi-sun Lee – composer
- CoCo Lee – singer
- Dai-Keong Lee – composer
- Cho-Liang Lin – violinist
- Jenny Lin – pianist
- Joseph Lin – first violinist for Juilliard String Quartet
- Amber Liu – rapper and singer of K-pop group f(x)
- Kate Liu – classical pianist
- Justin Lo – Hong Kong singer-songwriter, actor
- Zhou Long – winner of the 2011 Pulitzer Prize for Music
- Yo-Yo Ma (馬友友) – cellist
- Charles Mingus – jazz double bassist, composer, band leader
- Chino Moreno – vocalist and guitarist of Deftones
- Fats Navarro – jazz trumpeter
- Ne-Yo – R&B artist, 1/4 Chinese
- Richard On – guitarist-songwriter for rock band O.A.R.
- Will Pan – singer-songwriter, rapper and actor
- Saweetie – rapper
- Bright Sheng – composer, conductor, and pianist
- Shunza – singer
- Tan Dun - composer
- Vienna Teng – singer-songwriter
- Kenneth Tse – classical saxophonist
- Sam Tsui – YouTube singer
- Mark Tuan – Taiwanese rapper of K-pop group Got7
- Lara Veronin – vocalist
- Wang Leehom – singer-songwriter, record producer, actor and film director
- Joanna Wang – singer
- Kiki Wong, guitarist of Smashing Pumpkins
- Chris Wong Won ("Fresh Kid Ice", 'The Chinaman") – Chinese Trinidadian rapper, member of 2 Live Crew
- Only Won – rapper, actor, martial artist, producer of Finding Cleveland
- Vanness Wu – actor, singer, director, producer
- Sophia Yan – classical pianist
- Catalina Yue – singer, songwriter, model
- Nancy Zhou – violin player

=== Other ===
- Chang and Eng Bunker (暹羅雙胞胎) – Siamese twins, pioneer immigrants
- Francesca Fiorentini – comedian and activist
- Ken Hom – chef, author and British television show presenter
- Lindy Li — political commentator
- Steven Ho – martial artist and stunt man
- Janet Hsieh – model and travel host of Fun Taiwan
- Eddie Huang (黃頤銘) – writer, celebrity TV chef
- William Hung – musician of American Idol fame
- Carrie Ann Inaba – judge on Dancing with the Stars
- Rupert Jee – owner of the Hello Deli next to the Ed Sullivan Theater; regular on Late Show with David Letterman
- Zach King - American Internet Personality; father is of half Chinese ancestry
- Miranda Kwok – screenwriter
- Shin Lim (林申) – close-up magician
- Afong Moy – "The Chinese Lady," pioneer immigrant
- May Pang (庞凤仪) – personal assistant and arts producer for John Lennon and Yoko Ono, romantic partner with Lennon.
- Ming Tsai – chef and restaurateur (Blue Ginger); host of Emmy Award-winning television show East Meets West
- Shen Wei – choreographer, stage designer
- Kristina Wong (黄君儀) – comedian
- Martin Yan – chef, host of Yan Can Cook
- Janet Yang (杨燕子) - film producer
- Vern Yip – interior designer and TV host

== Journalism and news media ==
- Ben Calhoun – radio journalist with This American Life
- Melissa Chan – journalist with ABC News (2002-2004) and Al Jazeera America (2013-2016)
- Sewell Chan – journalist, The New York Times
- Emily Chang – journalist from CNN
- Iris Chang (張純如) – historian and journalist, Thread of the Silkworm and The Rape of Nanking
- Jeff Chang – journalist, hip-hop historian
- Laura Chang – science editor, The New York Times
- William Y. Chang – founder of the Chinese-American Times newspaper
- Adrian Chen – investigative journalist, staff writer at The New Yorker
- Christine Chen – journalist and anchor
- Julie Chen Moonves – newsreader on The Early Show and host of Big Brother
- Anna Chen Chennault (陳香梅) – journalist, spouse of Claire Chennault, of the Flying Tigers
- Ron Chew – former editor International Examiner, founding member of Seattle Chapter of the Asian American Journalists Association
- Howard G. Chua-Eoan – news director, Time magazine
- Connie Chung – became the second woman to co-anchor a major network national news broadcast
- Veronica De La Cruz – journalist, NBC News (2010–2014); alternating anchor on both Early Today on NBC and First Look on MSNBC
- Ben Fong-Torres (方振豪) – journalist, Rolling Stone
- Cindy Hsu – news reporter at WCBS-TV in New York City
- Weijia Jiang (姜偉嘉) - White House correspondent, CBS News
- Jennifer 8. Lee (李競) – journalist, The New York Times
- Melissa Lee – Emmy award-winning journalist, CNBC, NBC News, MSNBC, Bloomberg Television, CNN Financial News
- Portia Li (李秀蘭) – journalist
- Dion Lim – Emmy Award winning journalist
- Carol Lin – news anchor
- Sam Chu Lin (趙帝恩) – journalist, one of the first Asian Americans on network TV news
- Jo Ling Kent
- Laura Ling – journalist, sister of Lisa Ling
- Lisa Ling (凌志慧) (1973- ) – journalist, known for her role as a co-host of ABC's The View and host of National Geographic Ultimate Explorer
- Betty Liu – news anchor, Bloomberg Television
- Richard Lui – news anchor of MSNBC
- Chiang Nan (江南) – newspaper editor
- Kaity Tong – news anchor for WPIX-TV in New York City
- Edward Wong – journalist, former writer for The New York Times
- Sheryl WuDunn – Pulitzer Prize–winning journalist and author
- Jeff Yang – columnist for The Wall Street Journal
- John Yang – Peabody Award winning news correspondent and commentator for NBC Nightly News with Brian Williams, Today, and MSNBC
- Angela Yee - radio personality at Power 105.1FM
- Al Young journalist, 1st Asian American Mainland U.S. newspaper sportswriter, editor, columnist.
- Anthony Yuen (阮次山) – journalist

== Military ==
- Danny Chen (陳宇暉) – Private, United States Army Infantryman, was found shot to death after being racially harassed and beaten by his fellow soldiers in Afghanistan
- Arthur Chin (陳瑞鈿) – World War II pilot and fighter ace with Canton Provincial Air Force, National Revolutionary Army
- Larry Wu-tai Chin (金无怠) – CIA and Army translator and intelligence analyst 1944–1981, spy for China.
- David S. C. Chu – United States Army Captain (retired), Under Secretary of Defense for Personnel and Readiness (2001–2008), president/CEO of the Institute for Defense Analyses
- Gordon Pai'ea Chung-Hoon – United States Navy Rear Admiral (Upper Half)
- John Liu Fugh – first Chinese American officer to be promoted to the rank of major general in the United States Army; first Chinese American to serve as Judge Advocate General of the Army
- Lau Sing Kee - United States Army; for heroism in World War I he became the first Chinese American to be awarded the Distinguished Service Cross, the military's second highest award for valor.
- Wah Kau Kong – United States Air Force Second Lieutenant, first Chinese American fighter pilot
- Hazel Ying Lee (李月英) – first Chinese American woman to earn a pilot's license; flew for the United States Army Air Forces during World War II as a Woman Airforce Service Pilot (WASP)
- Kurt Lee – Major, US Marine Corps.; first Asian American Marine Corps officer, Navy Cross recipient
- Coral Wong Pietsch – United States Army Reserve Brigadier General, first female Asian American general officer
- Suzanne Vares-Lum - United States Army Major-General, served in Iraq War
- Francis B. Wai – United States Army Captain, only Chinese American to have been awarded the Medal of Honor
- Mun Charn Wong – United States Air Force Lieutenant Colonel, friend of Wah Kau Kong
- Ted Wong – United States Army Major General, Chief of the U.S. Army Dental Corps (2011–2014)
- Xiong Yan – student leader during the Tiananmen Square protests of 1989 and now a chaplain in the United States Army
- James Yee – United States Army Captain and chaplain, formerly charged with sedition; author of the memoir For God and Country: Faith and Patriotism Under Fire
- Jonathan A. Yuen – United States Navy Rear Admiral and commander of Naval Supply Systems Command
- Fang Wong – National Commander of The American Legion (2011–2012)

== Politics and government ==
=== National politics ===
- Elaine Chao (赵小兰) – former Secretary of Transportation (2017-2021) and former Secretary of Labor (2001–2009) (Republican)
- Lanhee Chen (陳仁宜) – conservative government policy academic, policy director in Mitt Romney's 2012 presidential campaign (Republican), news media political commentator
- Steven Chu (朱棣文) – physicist, former Secretary of Energy (2009–2013), winner of 1997 Nobel Prize in Physics for research in laser cooling (Democratic)
- Nancy-Ann DeParle – Director of the White House Office of Health Reform (Democratic)
- Gary Locke (骆家辉) – United States Ambassador to China (2011–2014); United States Secretary of Commerce (2009–2011); Governor of Washington (1997–2005), first and only Chinese American to serve as a state governor (Democratic)
- Chris Lu (卢沛宁) – Assistant to former President Barack Obama and Cabinet Secretary (Democratic)
- Julie Su - acting United States Secretary of Labor (2023-2025)
- Katherine Tai (戴琪) – 19th United States Trade Representative (2021-2025)
- Tina Tchen (陈远美) – Chief of Staff to the First Lady of the United States, director of Office of Public Liaison during Obama administration (Democratic)
- Andrew Yang (杨安泽) – unsuccessful 2020 presidential candidate

=== Congress ===
- Daniel Akaka – former US Senator from Hawaii; first Native Hawaiian US Senator; Democrat
- Judy Chu (趙美心) – first Chinese-American woman to serve as US Representative (2009–present); Democrat
- TJ Cox – US Representative from California (2019–2021); Democrat
- Charles Djou (周永康) – US Representative from Hawaii (2010–2011); Republican
- Tammy Duckworth – US Senator from Illinois; former Representative from the 8th District of Illinois, Assistant Secretary of Veterans Affairs, and Director of the Illinois Department of Veterans Affairs; Democrat
- Hiram L. Fong (鄺友良) – former US Senator from Hawaii; first US Senator of Chinese ancestry; Republican
- Vince Fong (方文思) – Republican representing the 20th District of California; former member of the California State Assembly
- Ted Lieu (劉雲平) – Democrat representing the 33rd District of California
- Grace Meng (孟昭文) – Democrat representing the 22nd District of New York
- Antonio B. Won Pat – US Delegate from Guam (1973–1985); Washington Delegate to Guam (1965–1973); Speaker of the Guam Legislature (1951–1955; 1957–1965)
- David Wu (吳振偉) – first Taiwanese American US Representative, Democrat from Oregon

=== Local and state ===
- Duke Aiona – former Lieutenant Governor of Hawaii (2002–2010); Republican
- Vicky Cayetano – former First Lady of Hawaii (1997–2002)
- Elisa Chan – former member of the San Antonio City Council (2009–2013)
- Steve Chan – member of the New York State Senate (2025–Pres); Republican
- Wilma Chan – first Asian American California State Assembly Majority Leader (2002–2004); Democrat
- Ling Ling Chang – member of the California State Senate (2018–2022), member of the California State Assembly (2014–2016); Republican
- Ed Chau – member of the California State Assembly (2012–2021); Democrat
- John Chiang – California State Controller (2007–present); Democrat
- Lily Lee Chen – Mayor of Monterey Park, California; first female Chinese-American mayor in the United States
- Doug Chin – Lieutenant Governor of Hawaii (2018); Attorney General of Hawaii (2015-2018); Democrat
- Margaret Chin – member of the New York City Council representing Chinatown
- David Chiu – Democrat representing the 17th Assembly District, California State Assembly
- Iwen Chu – member of the New York State Senate (2023–2024); Democrat
- Kansen Chu – member of the California State Assembly (2014–2020), member of the San Jose City Council (2007–2014), member of the Berryessa Union School District Board of Trustees
- Jake Fitisemanu – member of the Utah House of Representatives (2025–Pres); Democrat
- March Fong Eu – former Secretary of State of California (1975–1994), elected in 1974, she won reelection four times; United States Ambassador to the Federated States of Micronesia (1994–1996); Democrat
- Matthew K. Fong – California State Treasurer (1995–1999), adoptive son of March Fong Eu; Republican
- Allan Fung – Mayor of Cranston, Rhode Island (2009–2021); Republican
- Karen Goh – Mayor of Bakersfield, California; Republican
- Tony Hwang – State Representative of the Connecticut General Assembly; Republican
- Andrew T.F. Ing – Lieutenant Governor of Hawaii (1966); Democrat
- Ed Jew – former member of the San Francisco Board of Supervisors; Democrat
- James Kealoha – Lieutenant Governor of Hawaii (1959–1962); Republican
- Peter Koo – member of the New York City Council representing Flushing, Queens
- Ed Lee – Mayor of San Francisco (2011–2017)
- Harry Lee – longtime sheriff of Jefferson Parish, Louisiana; first elected in 1979, he was re-elected six times and served 27 and a half years (Democratic)
- Susan C. Lee – Senator, Maryland Senate of Maryland General Assembly;first Asian American elected to Maryland Senate and first Chinese American elected to Maryland House of Delegates and Maryland General Assembly.
- John Liu – New York City Comptroller (2010–2013)
- Jimmy Meng – fNew York State Assembly (2005–2006); Democrat
- Kaleo Moylan – Lieutenant Governor of Guam (2003–2007), Member of the Guam Legislature (1999–2003); Republican
- Kurt Moylan – Lieutenant Governor of Guam (1971–1975), Secretary of Guam (1969–1971); Republican
- Lily Qi – Member of the Maryland House of Delegates (2019–Pres); Democrat
- William S. Richardson – 16th Chief Justice of the Hawaii Supreme Court, 2nd Lieutenant Governor of Hawaii; Democrat
- Sandra Ung – member of the New York City Council
- Alex Wan – member of the Atlanta City Council, first openly gay and first Asian American member
- Shien Biau Woo (吳仙標) – Lieutenant Governor of Delaware (1985–1989), current president of the 80-20 Initiative; Democrat
- Gene Wu – Minority Leader of the Texas House of Representatives, member since 2013; Democrat
- Lily Wu – Mayor of Wichita, Kansas; Libertarian
- Michelle Wu (吳弭) – Mayor of Boston
- Rui Xu – member of the Kansas House of Representatives
- Leland Yee (余 胤 良) – California State Assembly (2006–2014), California State Senate (2002–2006), San Francisco Board of Supervisors (1997–2002); Democrat
- Yiaway Yeh – mayor of Palo Alto, California; first Chinese American to hold the office
- Mae Yih – Oregon House of Representatives (1977–1983), Oregon State Senate (1983–2003), first Chinese American to serve in a state senate; Democrat
- Janice Zahn – Member of the Washington House of Representatives (2025–Pres); Democrat

=== Law and judiciary ===
- Norman Bay – former United States Attorney for the District of New Mexico (2000–2001); first Chinese American United States Attorney
- Denny Chin – judge of the United States District Court for the Southern District of New York (1994–present), first Asian American appointed as a United States district court judge outside of the Ninth Circuit
- Ming Chin – Associate Justice, Supreme Court of California
- Dorothy Chin Brandt – Acting Justice, New York Supreme Court, Criminal Term, Queens County
- Morgan Chu (朱欽文) – Partner, Chair of Litigation, former Co-Managing Partner of Irell & Manella; former president (2014–15) and board member (2009–15) of Harvard Board of Overseers
- Amy Chua – professor of law; author of Battle Hymn of the Tiger Mother
- Dolly M. Gee – federal district judge, United States District Court for the Central District of California
- Joyce Kennard – Associate Justice, Supreme Court of California
- George H. King – federal district judge, United States District Court for the Central District of California
- William F. Lee – co-managing partner of WilmerHale and fellow of the Harvard Corporation
- Ronald Lew – federal district judge, United States District Court for the Central District of California; first Chinese-American federal judge outside of Hawaii
- Goodwin Liu – Associate Justice of the Supreme Court of California
- Nicole Shanahan – attorney
- Brian Sun – trial lawyer
- Thomas Tang – judge of the United States Court of Appeals for the Ninth Circuit; first Chinese American federal judge
- Jan C. Ting (丁景安) – professor of law; expert on immigration, national security, and taxation; 2006 Republican candidate for Senate (DE)
- Qian Julie Wang (王乾) – Lawyer and memoirist
- Delbert Wong – judge

=== Community and civil rights ===
- Grace Lee Boggs (陳玉平) – community activist in African-American community; leftist writer
- Chin Lin Sou – community leader
- Hung Wai Ching – community leader and businessman
- Goo Kim Fui (古今辉) – President, United Chinese Society in Hawaii, 1892–1898; played an instrumental role in uniting the Chinese and fighting for their rights during the anti-Chinese agitation in Hawaii in the 1880s
- Charles Goodall Lee – first licensed Chinese American dentist in the United States, financier of Chinese American Citizens Alliance in Oakland Chinatown, spouse of Clara Elizabeth Chan Lee
- Clara Elizabeth Chan Lee – first Chinese American woman voter in the United States
- Mabel Ping-Hua Lee – Chinese advocate for women's suffrage in the United States, community organizer in New York City's Chinatown, and leader of the First Chinese Baptist Church in Chinatown.
- Wong Chin Foo (王清福) – 19th-century civil rights activist and journalist
- Wong Kim Ark (黃金德) – his lawsuit established the principle of citizenship by virtue of birth on US soil
- Harry Wu (吴弘达) – human rights activist, focuses on Laogai prison camps and human rights in China
- Sherman Wu – civil rights activist, famous racial discrimination incident by university fraternity
- Xiao Qiang (萧强) – MacArthur Fellowship for human rights activism, publisher of China Digital Times covering rights and censorship in China, journalism professor
- John C. Young (容兆珍) – San Francisco Chinatown leader
- Helen Zia (謝漢蘭) – community activist and writer

== Science and academia ==
=== Nobel Prize ===
- Chen Ning Yang (楊振寧) – 1957 Nobel laureate, Physics, Yang–Mills theory
- Tsung-dao Lee (李政道) – 1957 Nobel laureate, Physics
- Samuel C. C. Ting (丁肇中) – 1976 Nobel laureate, Physics
- Yuan T. Lee (李远哲) – 1986 Nobel Prize, Chemistry
- Steven Chu (朱棣文) – 1997 Nobel Prize in Physics, US Secretary of Energy (2009)
- Daniel Chee Tsui (崔琦) – 1998 Nobel laureate, Physics
- Roger Y. Tsien (錢永健) – 2008 Nobel laureate, Chemistry
- Charles K. Kao (高锟) – 2009 Nobel laureate in Physics who pioneered the development and use of fiber optics in telecommunications

=== Mathematics award winners ===
- Terence Chi-Shen Tao (陶哲軒) – Fields Medal (2006), Clay Research Award (2003), Crafoord Prize (2012)
- Shing-Tung Yau (丘成桐) – Fields Medal (1982), Wolf Prize (2010), Crafoord Prize (1994)
- Andrew Yao (姚期智) – Turing Award (2000)
- Shiing-Shen Chern (陳省身) – Wolf Prize (1983)
- Wei Zhang (张伟) – Clay Research Award (2019)
- Xinyi Yuan (袁新意) – Clay Research Award (2008)

=== Chemistry ===
- Ching W. Tang – inventor of the organic light-emitting diode(OLED) and the hetero-junction organic photovoltaic cell (OPV); winner of the 2011 Wolf Prize in Chemistry; known as the "father of organic electronics"
- Roger Y. Tsien (錢永健) – 2008 Nobel laureate, chemistry
- Peidong Yang – chemist; founding member of the scientific advisory board at Nanosys, a nanomaterials company; co-founder of Alphabet Energy
- Xiaowei Zhuang – Professor of Chemistry and Chemical Biology and of Physics at Harvard University, member of National Academy of Sciences, MacArthur Fellow (2003)
- Zhijian Chen (陈志坚) - Professor in the Department of Molecular Biology at University of Texas Southwestern Medical Center. He is best known for his discovery of mechanisms by which nucleic acids trigger innate and autoimmune responses from the interior of a cell, work for which he received the 2019 Breakthrough Prize in Life Sciences.
- Xiaoliang Sunney Xie (谢晓亮) - biochemist, considered a founding father of single-molecule biophysical chemistry and single-molecule enzymology

=== Computer science ===
- Danqi Chen (陈丹琦) – AI professor at Princeton University working in Natural language processing, PhD from Stanford University, former student of Andrew Yao
- Jianlin Cheng (程建林) – computer and data scientist; Associate Professor in the Computer Science Department at the University of Missouri, Columbia
- Wen Tsing Chow (周文俊) – missile guidance scientist, digital computer pioneer
- Leon Chua – professor in the Department of Electrical Engineering and Computer Sciences at the University of California, Berkeley
- Feng-hsiung Hsu (許峰雄) – IBM developer of Deep Blue, which beat World Chess Champion Garry Kasparov in 1997
- Fei-Fei Li (李飞飞) – AI researcher, Stanford University professor
- Kai Li – Princeton University
- Ming C. Lin – former Distinguished Professor of Computer Science at the University of North Carolina at Chapel Hill, now at U. Maryland.
- Andrew Ng (吴恩达) – AI researcher and entrepreneur: Google Brain, Baidu research, Coursera, Stanford University professor
- Carol E. Reiley: entrepreneur in health, robotics and AI, Andrew Ng's wife
- Pei-Yuan Wei (魏培源) – creator of ViolaWWW
- Wen-mei Hwu – professor at University of Illinois at Urbana–Champaign specializing in compiler design, computer architecture, computer microarchitecture, and parallel processing
- Andrew Yao (姚期智) – 2000 Turing Award recipient, Yao's principle, former professor at Princeton University
- Frances Yao (储枫) – computer scientist, researcher in computational geometry and combinatorial algorithms; wife of Andrew Yao
- Yuanyuan Zhou – Princeton University PhD, currently UC San Diego

=== Engineering ===
- Huajian Gao – Walter H. Annenberg Professor of Engineering at Brown University
- Tung Hua Lin (林同驊) – professor (UCLA), aerospace and structural engineer
- Tung-Yen Lin (林同棪) – (Berkeley) structural engineer who was the pioneer of standardizing the use of prestressed concrete, founded T. Y. Lin International
- Lee Yuk-Wing (李郁榮) – Professor of Electrical Engineering at Massachusetts Institute of Technology

=== Mathematics ===
- Terence Chi-Shen Tao (陶哲軒) – child genius, Fields Medal winner (2006), professor (UCLA), MacArthur Fellow (2006), Crafoord Prize (2012), Breakthrough Prize in Mathematics (2014). He is the youngest participant to date in the International Mathematical Olympiad, first competing at the age of ten; in 1986, 1987, and 1988, he won a bronze, silver, and gold medal. He remains the youngest winner of each of the three medals in the Olympiad's history, winning the gold medal shortly after his thirteenth birthday. Tao received graduated from university at the age of 16 obtaining his bachelor's and master's degrees, received his PhD at the age of 20.
- Lenhard Ng – child prodigy who was once thought to be the "smartest kid in America". At age 10, he earned a perfect score of 800 on the math portion of what is now called the SAT, a feat considered to be a “remarkable achievement” when a high school junior or senior did it. Ng is a professor of mathematics at Duke University.
- Jeffrey Yi-Lin Forrest (林益) – professor of mathematics, systems science, economics, and finance at Pennsylvania State System of Higher Education (Slippery Rock campus)
- Wei Zhang (张伟) – Professor of Mathematics at the Massachusetts Institute of Technology
- Sun-Yung Alice Chang (张圣容) – professor of mathematics and former chair of the department at Princeton University
- Chen Wen-chen (陈文成) – professor of math at Carnegie Mellon, victim of Taiwan KMT persecution of dissidents (see White Terror)
- Shiing-Shen Chern (陳省身) – Wolf Prize, considered one of the greatest mathematicians of the 20th century; worked on differential geometry and topology; known for Chern-Simons theory, Chern-Weil theory, Chern classes
- Chia-Kun Chu (朱家琨) – applied mathematician, Fu Foundation Professor Emeritus of Applied Mathematics at Columbia University
- Chia-Chiao Lin (林家翹) – applied mathematician
- Tian Gang (田刚) – Princeton University professor emeritus, student of S.T. Yau
- Paul Tseng – applied mathematician, professor at the Department of Mathematics at the University of Washington in Seattle
- Paul C. Yang (杨建平) – Princeton University, husband of Alice Chang
- Shing-Tung Yau (丘成桐) – Fields Medal winner (1982); MacArthur Fellow (1984), Crafoord Prize (1994), National Medal of Science (1997), Wolf Prize (2010)
- Yitang Zhang – mathematician, known for establishing the first finite bound on gaps between prime numbers
- Stephen Shing-Toung Yau – Distinguished Professor Emeritus at the University of Illinois at Chicago
- Mu-Tao Wang (王慕道) – Professor of Mathematics at Columbia University, received a PhD in Mathematics in 1998 from Harvard University

=== Medicine and biosciences ===
- Priscilla Chan (陈Priscilla) – Harvard-graduated pediatrician, Chan-Zuckerberg foundation
- Min Chueh Chang (張明覺) – co-inventor of the first birth control pill; made significant contributions to the development of in vitro fertilisation
- Gilbert Chu (朱築文) – biochemist and Professor of Medicine (Oncology) and Biochemistry at the Stanford Medical School; older brother of Steven Chu
- Yuan-Cheng Fung (馮元楨) – founder of modern biomechanics
- Lue Gim Gong (呂金功) – horticulturalist
- David Ho – scientific researcher and the Irene Diamond professor at Rockefeller University in New York City
- Alice S. Huang – virologist
- Lin He – biochemist, received the MacArthur Fellowship in 2009
- Yuet Wai Kan – pioneer of using DNA to diagnose human diseases, research enabled the Human Genome Project, recipient of Lasker Foundation award in 1991
- Henry C. Lee – forensic scientist
- Sandra Lee – dermatologist and Internet celebrity as "Dr. Pimple Popper"; now star of the TLC series Dr. Pimple Popper
- Ching Chun Li – population geneticist and human geneticist
- Choh Hao Li (李卓皓) – biochemist, discovered growth hormone, beta-endorphin and isolated luteinizing hormone
- Min Chiu Li – first scientist to use chemotherapy to cure widely metastatic, malignant cancer
- Anna Chao Pai – geneticist
- Joe Hin Tjio – cytogeneticist, first person to recognize the normal number of human chromosomes
- Chang Yi Wang – immunologist; NYIPLA Inventor of the Year Award in 2007 for her work on UBITh peptide immunogens
- James C. Wang – discovered DNA topoisomerases
- Sam Wang – neuroscientist and author
- Shih-Chun Wang – neuroscientist and pharmacology professor
- Xiaodong Wang (王晓东) – biochemist best known for his work with cytochrome c, won the 2000 Eli Lilly Award in Biological Chemistry, and 2006 Shaw Prize recipient
- Leana Wen (温麟衍) – physician; director of Planned Parenthood, Health Commissioner of Baltimore, author
- David T. Wong – discovered drug Fluoxetine and atomoxetine, duloxetine and dapoxetine
- Flossie Wong-Staal – virologist and AIDS researcher
- Junying Yu – stem cell biologist; recognized as one of the 2007 "Persons of the Year" by TIME magazine
- Kang Zhang – ophthalmologist known for resigning from University of California, San Diego due to unethical behavior

=== Physics ===
- Sow-Hsin Chen – nuclear physicist
- Alfred Y. Cho – the "father of molecular beam epitaxy" and co-inventor of quantum cascade lasers
- Paul C. W. Chu (朱經武) – physicist, superconductivity
- Qian Xuesen (钱学森) – professor of aeronautics, a founder of NASA Jet Propulsion Laboratory, exiled to China
- Frank Shu – professor of astronomy at the University of California, Berkeley and University of California; San Diego and 2009 Shaw Prize recipient
- Chien-Shiung Wu (吳健雄) – Manhattan Project scientist; considerable contribution to Nobel Prize work by Tsung-dao Lee
- Yang Yang, physicist, solar cells. Professor at UCLA. Fellow, American Association for the Advancement of Science, American Physical Society, Materials Research Society, Royal Society of Chemistry, and Society of Photo-Optical Instrumentation Engineers.
- Nai-Chang Yeh – physicist specialized in condensed matter physics; Fellow, American Association for the Advancement of Science; Fellow, American Physical Society
- Shoucheng Zhang – Stanford physicist
- Chen Ning Yang (楊振寧) – 1957 Nobel laureate, Physics, Yang–Mills theory
- Tsung-dao Lee (李政道) – 1957 Nobel laureate, Physics
- Samuel C. C. Ting (丁肇中) – 1976 Nobel laureate, Physics
- Steven Chu (朱棣文) – 1997 Nobel Prize in Physics, US Secretary of Energy (2009)
- Daniel Chee Tsui (崔琦) – 1998 Nobel laureate, Physics
- Charles K. Kao (高锟) – 2009 Nobel laureate in Physics who pioneered the development and use of fiber optics in telecommunications
- Xiaoxing Xi (郗小星) – Physicist at Temple University]

=== Economics, Finance, Statistics, OR ===
- Anthony Chan – chief economist, JPMorgan Chase; former economist at the Federal Reserve Bank of New York and economics professor at the University of Dayton
- Gregory Chow (鄒至莊) – Class of 1913 Professor of Political Economy at Princeton University, known for Chow test
- Jianqing Fan (范剑青) – professor of finance and statistics at Princeton University
- William C. Hsiao (萧庆伦) – economist, professor at Harvard T.H. Chan School of Public Health
- Ann Lee (李淯) – professor, author and commentator on global economics and finance issues
- Bin Yu (郁彬) – Chancellor's Professor in the Departments of Statistics and of Electrical Engineering & Computer Sciences at University of California, Berkeley

=== Social sciences ===
- Angela Lee Duckworth – professor of Psychology at the University of Pennsylvania, MacArthur Fellow; wrote Grit: The Power of Passion and Perseverance
- Peter Kwong – professor of Asian American studies at Hunter College and professor of sociology in the City University of New York system
- Yu Xie – Bert G. Kerstetter '66 University Professor of Sociology at Princeton University; known for applying quantitative data science methods to sociology as well as Chinese studies

=== Humanities ===
- Wing-tsit Chan (陳榮捷) – professor in Chinese philosophy, wrote influential translations
- Him Mark Lai (麥禮謙) – professor of Chinese American studies
- Lin Yutang (林語堂) – Hokkien Chinese writer
- Huping Ling (令狐萍) – professor of History at Truman State University, author
- Liu Kwang-ching (劉廣京) – Historian of late imperial China; University of California, Davis.
- Betty Lee Sung (宋李瑞芳) – former professor of Asian-American Studies at City College of New York; 'leading authority' on Chinese Americans
- Andrew Lih (酈安治) – associate professor of Journalism at American University
- Teng Ssu-yu (鄧嗣禹) – Historian of late imperial China, at University of Indiana.
- Tim Wu (吳修銘) – professor at Columbia Law School, in 2014 ran to become the first Chinese-American lieutenant governor of New York State but lost.
- C.K. Yang (楊慶堃) – Sociologist at University of Pittsburgh.
- Yang Lien-sheng (楊聯陞) – Sinologist. Harvard University.
- Yu Ying-shih (余英時) – Historian of China; Harvard, Yale, and Princeton Universities.
- Zhao Yuanren (Yuen Ren Chao) (趙元任) – Linguist at Harvard and University of California, Berkeley.

=== University administration ===
- Jim Chen – professor and former dean at the University of Louisville Brandeis School of Law
- Stephen Z.D. Cheng – Professor and former Dean in the College of Polymer Science and Polymer Engineering at the University of Akron, member of National Academic of Engineering
- David Jung-Kuang Chiu – former Director of Asian Studies and Dean of University Advisement, Hofstra University
- Way Kuo (郭位) – President and University Distinguished Professor of the City University of Hong Kong, University Distinguished Professor and former Dean of Engineering at the University of Tennessee
- Robert C. T. Lee (李崇道) – former president of National Chung Hsing University, veterinarian and brother of Tsung-dao Lee
- Wallace Loh (陸道逵) - Former President of University of Maryland College Park
- Chang-Lin Tien (田長霖) – Chancellor of University of California, Berkeley (1990–1997)
- Frank H. Wu (吳華揚) – Chancellor and Dean of the University of California, Hastings College of the Law (2010–2015)
- Henry T. Yang (楊祖佑) – former chancellor of UC Santa Barbara

=== Earth Sciences ===
- Sherry Chen (陈霞芬) – Hydrologist working for National Weather Service

== Sports ==
- Nathan Adrian (倪家骏) – Olympic medal winner, swimming
- Shayna Baszler – professional wrestler and mixed martial artist
- Johnny Chan (陳金海, 陳強尼) – professional poker player
- Michael Chang (張德培) – youngest male tennis player to win a Grand Slam tournament
- Ray Chang – baseball player
- Karen Chen (陳楷雯) – figure skater
- Nathan Chen (陳巍) – figure skater, 2022 Olympic gold medalist
- Andrew Chin – professional baseball player
- Tiffany Chin (陳婷婷) – figure skater and 1985 U.S. national champion
- Brian Ching (程拜仁) – soccer player for Houston Dynamo and the United States national team
- William Kwai-sun Chow – martial arts instructor
- Mark Chung – first American-Chinese soccer player to play for the United States national team
- Patrick Chung – Strong Safety for the New England Patriots
- Amy Chow (周婉儀) – gymnast and Olympic medal winner
- Norm Chow (周友賢) – UCLA Bruins offensive coordinator
- Julie Chu (朱慧雯) – Olympic medal winner, ice hockey
- Mark Foo – professional surfer
- Christina Gao (高昊) – figure skater
- Chau Giang – poker player
- Eileen Gu (谷爱凌) – Free style skier and Olympic gold medalist
- Rudy Gunawan (郭宏源) – badminton player
- Tony Gunawan (吳俊明) – badminton player
- Ivana Hong – gymnastics
- Jerry Hsu – skateboarder
- Michelle Jin (米歇尔·金) – professional bodybuilder
- John Juanda – poker player
- Phillip King – tennis player, brother of Vania King
- Vania King – tennis player who won both the 2010 Wimbledon Women's Doubles and 2010 US Open Women's Doubles titles
- Jonathan Klinsmann – soccer goalkeeper for LA Galaxy
- Theodore Ku-DiPietro – soccer player
- Karen Kwan – former figure skater, sister of Michelle Kwan
- Michelle Kwan (關穎珊) – Olympic medal winner, figure skating
- Alice Lee – chess player, FIDE Master
- Jeremy Lin (林書豪) – professional basketball player, NBA (NY Knicks, Toronto Raptors, etc.), Linsanity
- Alysa Liu – figure skater and 2026 Olympic champion
- Corrie Lothrop – gymnastics
- Tyson Mao – speedcuber
- Kim Ng (伍佩琴) – Major League Baseball executive
- Karlee Perez – professional wrestler known as Catrina and the WWE as Maxine (Chinese ancestry)
- Chuck Sun – professional Motocross racer
- Kevin Tan (谭凯文) – Olympic medal winner, gymnastics
- Ed Wang – professional American football player
- Lisa Wang – rhythmic gymnastics
- Joey Wong – professional baseball player
- Kevin Wong – professional beach volleyball player and Olympian
- Raymond Wu (吳紹綱) – professional poker player
- Don Yee – sports agent
- Al Young – World Champion drag racer
- Jennifer Yu (于潤荷) – U.S. women's chess champion in 2019 and 2022
- Caroline Zhang (张圆圆) – figure skater
- Lily Zhang (张安) – table tennis player
- Rose Zhang – professional golfer on the LPGA Tour

== Other ==
=== Astronauts ===
- Leroy Chiao (焦立中) – NASA astronaut
- Kjell N. Lindgren (林其兒) – NASA astronaut
- Edward Lu (盧傑) – NASA astronaut
- Taylor Wang (王赣骏) – first ethnic Chinese scientist to go into space, in 1985 on space shuttle Challenger

=== Gang leaders and criminals ===
- Wing Yeung Chan – leader of New York Ghost Shadows street gang
- Raymond Kwok Chow (周國祥) – also known as "Shrimp Boy", mobster, leader of the San Francisco chapter of Chinese Freemasons and San Francisco Chinatown
- Peter Chong (莊炳強) – leader of San Francisco area Wo Hop To gang
- David Chou (周文偉) – perpetrator of 2022 Laguna Woods church shooting
- Mock Duck (世荣模拟) – New York Chinatown mobster, leader of the Hip Sing Tong
- Johnny "Onionhead" Eng (伍少衡) – leader of New York Flying Dragons street gang
- Joe Fong – founder of San Francisco Chung Ching Yee (Joe Boys) street gang
- Katrina Leung (陈文英) – Spy for MSS
- Wayne Lo (駱文) – murderer who perpetrated the shooting at Simon's Rock College of Bard on December 14, 1992, in Great Barrington, Massachusetts
- Danny Pang – private equity manager, accused of running a Ponzi scheme
- Little Pete (馮正初) – San Francisco Chinatown mobster
- Elliot Rodger – of mixed English and Malaysian Chinese descent who perpetrated the 2014 Isla Vista shootings
- Ming Sen Shiue (薛明升) – committed notorious 1980 murder, rape, stalking
- Stephen Tse – leader of Boston Ping On street gang

=== Crime victims ===
- Bow Kum – her murder was the precipitating event for infamous New York Tong war
- Vincent Jen Chin (陳果仁) – beaten to death in 1982 racial hate incident by two White men considered by Chinese-American advocacy groups to be miscarriage of American justice
- Wenjian Liu – first Chinese American officer in the New York City Police Department to die in the line of duty in 2014
- Betty Ong (鄧月薇) – flight attendant on American Airlines Flight 11, alerted ground crews and kept the world informed of the hijacking in progress

=== Religious leaders ===
- Francis Chan – preacher, founder of Cornerstone Community Church in Simi Valley, CA
- Witness Lee --- Preacher for the Local Churches, founder of the Living Stream Ministry
- Chow Leung – Baptist missionary in Chicago, Chinese school founder, co-author of Chinese Fables and Folk Stories
- Gerrit W. Gong – Member of the Quorum of the Twelve Apostles of The Church of Jesus Christ of Latter-day Saints
- Jian Tan (見曇) – Buddhist monk and current abbot of the Chung Tai Zen Center of Houston
- Jakusho Kwong – Zen Buddhist Master of Shunryu Suzuki lineage, founder and head abbot of Sonoma Mountain Zen Center
- Jacqueline Mates-Muchin – world's first Chinese-American rabbi
- Ignatius C. Wang – Auxiliary Bishop of San Francisco (2002–2009)
- Shi Yan Ming (釋延明) – 34th generation Shaolin monk and founder of the USA Shaolin Temple
- Jimmy Yu (Guo Gu or 果谷) – Chan teacher of Sheng Yen lineage, Associate Professor of Religion at Florida State University and founder of Tallahassee Chan Center in Tallahassee, Florida

=== Other ===
- Bei Bei Shuai (帅贝贝) – Prosecuted for murder and feticide due to a pregnancy loss after a suicide attempt.
