= Purvi Patel =

Indian American

Purvi Patel (born c. 1982) is an Indian American whose conviction and sentence to 20 years in prison in Indiana for feticide and child neglect was overturned by the Indiana Court of Appeals. The court pointed out that the lower court's ruling had been an "abrupt departure" from the intent of the feticide law as shown by prior usage, which consisted of cases in which a pregnant woman and her unborn child were the victims of violence. The court also said that it was not possible to claim that lawmakers had intended the feticide law to be used to prosecute women trying to abort because the state abortion laws had already since the 1800s explicitly protected pregnant women from prosecution. "The state's about-face in this proceeding is unsettling, as well as untenable" under prior court precedent, Judge Terry Crone wrote in the ruling. The court said that Patel endangered the child by not seeking medical care but that prosecutors failed to prove that her failure to do so resulted in the child's death.

Patel's case had caused international controversy because the overturned conviction had opened the door for any woman who expresses doubt about her pregnancy to be charged if she miscarries or has a stillbirth. If her conviction had not been overturned, she would have been the first woman in the United States to be charged, convicted, and sentenced on a feticide charge. Her case has also been compared to the prosecution of Bei Bei Shuai under similar circumstances.

== The events on July 13, 2013 ==
On July 13, 2013, Patel "delivered a baby boy measuring thirty-one centimeters (approximately one foot) long and weighing 660 grams (slightly less than one and a half pounds)" at home in her bathroom. After sending a text to a friend stating "Just lost the baby", Patel "placed the baby in a plastic shopping bag containing bathroom trash and an airline boarding pass with Patel's name." On her way to a medical facility to get help for her uninterrupted bleeding, Patel "put the bag containing the baby into a dumpster". At St. Joseph Regional Medical Center in Mishawaka, Indiana, "[b]ased on the size of the umbilical cord...[examining physicians] Ob/gyn Dr. Tracy Byrne and OB/GYN Dr. Kelly McGuire...determined that 'there had to have been a baby'". After questioning by both doctors, Patel "finally acknowledged that she had given birth to a baby and stated that she had put it in a paper bag and placed it in a dumpster behind a Target store". "Because '[i]t was a warm night and based on the size of the umbilical cord[,]' Dr. McGuire 'thought that [they] could find a baby that was far enough along that could still be alive' and left the hospital to search for it". "Officers searched dumpsters in that area and finally found the plastic bag containing Patel's baby at 12:06 a.m."

== Criminal proceedings ==
The prosecution alleged that the miscarriage had been caused by an abortifacient per her documented text messages exchanged with her friend, even though doctors found no trace of the drugs in her body. Prosecutors charged Patel with feticide for allegedly inducing an abortion, as the pills in question had been purchased online overseas, which was illegal in the United States. The prosecutor claimed that Indiana's law allows for women to be convicted of feticide for attempting to end a pregnancy even if the fetus survives. They also charged her with child neglect after claiming that the fetus had been alive when born.

=== Lung float test ===
The defense pathologist testified that the 23- or 24-week fetus was stillborn, with lungs insufficiently developed to breathe, while the prosecution pathologist testified that the fetus was at 25 to 30 weeks and was born alive. The prosecutors used a widely discredited lung float test to determine whether the fetus took a breath after birth. The procedure tests the buoyancy of the lungs in the belief that lungs that float suggest that the fetus took a breath, and the lungs in this case did float. Forensic experts discredit the use of such a test in criminal proceedings because of the number of false positives on record. The jury in Patel's case determined the fetus had been alive and found Patel guilty of child neglect.

=== Appeal ===
On April 22, 2015, Patel filed an appeal to the ruling. Her lawyers aimed to challenge the feticide charge and the lung float test evidence. On January 28, 2016, the Indiana Court of Appeals agreed to hear oral arguments in the appeal. A three-member panel of judges heard arguments from both sides on May 23.

On July 22, 2016, the court ruled in her favor and specified that the legislature had not intended for the feticide statute to be applied to illegal self-induced abortion, and so it vacated the feticide charge. The court also ruled that while the state had proven that the child was born alive, it did not prove that the child would not have died if she had sought immediate medical attention. It therefore vacated the Class A neglect charge and remanded the case to the trial court with instructions to enter judgment of conviction for class D felony neglect of a dependent and resentence her accordingly. The trial court then changed the sentence to 18 months. She had already served more time than this, so she was then released.
