= Fang Wong =

National Commander of The American Legion (in office from 2011 to 2012)

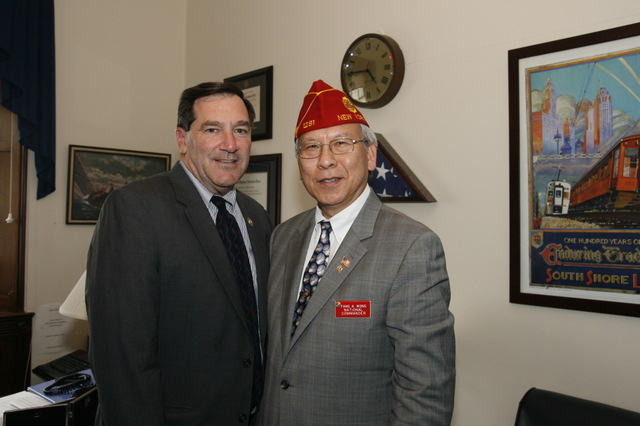
- Joe Donnelly and Wong in 2011
- Born: Fang A. Wong; February 27, 1948 (age 78); Canton, China
- Education: New York Institute of Technology (BS)
- Title: National Commander of The American Legion
- Term: 2011–2012
- Predecessor: Jimmie L. Foster
- Successor: James E. Koutz
- Spouse: Barbara Lam
- Children: Eric Wong (son)
- Military career
- Allegiance: United States of America
- Branch: Army
- Service years: 1969–1989
- Rank: Chief Warrant Officer 3
- Conflicts: Vietnam War
- Awards: Bronze Star Medal

Fang A. Wong (born February 27, 1948) is a retired United States Army warrant officer who served as the National Commander of The American Legion from 2011 to 2012.

== Early life and career ==
Fang A. Wong was born in Canton, China, and immigrated to the United States in 1960 at the age of 12. Wong's military career began in 1969 when he enlisted in the United States Army and deployed to the Republic of Vietnam, serving for 25 months. Wong retired from the Army as a Chief Warrant Officer 3 in 1989.

== The American Legion ==
Wong was elected National Commander on September 1, 2011, and promptly set out on a whirlwind tour of the 55 state-level departments of The American Legion. Issues he lobbied for included promoting participation in the Legion for younger veterans and healthcare for older veterans. Other initiatives included improving the efficiency of the VA disability claims process through greater digitization of paperwork and speeding up the transition between military training and civilian employment qualifications like requirements for a commercial truck driving license ("Don't tell me they can't drive a truck down an interstate").

== See also ==
- List of Chinese Americans

Non-profit organization positions
Preceded by Jimmie L. Foster	National Commander of The American Legion; 2011–2012	Succeeded by James E. Koutz
