= John Chuang (American businessman) =

American entrepreneur and investor

- Education: Harvard University (BA, MBA)
- Known for: Aquent

John Chuang is a Taiwanese-American entrepreneur and investor. He is the co-founder and CEO of Aquent, a staffing company for the marketing and creative industries, and chairman of the board of Angie's List, a crowd sourced review website, of which he is a lead investor. He is also the co-founder of the litl webbook, a device and cloud-based OS, geared for Internet browsing.

== Education ==
He is a graduate of Harvard College and Harvard Business School. He still drove the same 1987 Toyota Corolla he had in college when interviewed by Entrepreneur magazine in 2003.

== Aquent ==
Along with other Harvard College students Mia Wenjen and Steve Kapner, he co-founded in 1986 a typesetting business from the Harvard dorm. That business went into temporary staffing related to Mac training, and it later expanded into other areas of staffing before becoming one of the largest staffing agencies in the US for creative and marketing industries.

== TRI Investments ==
He is CEO of TRI Investments, an investment fund. The fund is the lead shareholder of Angie's List, a crowd sourced review website, holding 20% of the stock. Chuang has served on the board of Angie's List since 1996 and assumed the role of chairman of the board in 2014. Through the fund he has founded companies related to recruiting. In 2007 he was a minority partner with Sean Bisceglia in the creation of TalentDrive, a resume search platform, and in 2013 again with Sean Bisceglia, he co-founded Scout, an executive search startup.
