= Litl =

litl webbook
- Developer: litl LLC
- Manufacturer: First International Computer
- Type: Webbook
- Released: November 9, 2009
- Introductory price: $699
- Operating system: litl OS
- CPU: 1.86 GHz Atom Z540
- Website: litl.com

The litl webbook is a webbook developed, marketed, and sold by litl LLC.

The webbook features the ability to stand upright in an inverted-V position and a cloud-based operating system called litl OS.

== Origins ==
Litl's CEO John Chuang, also co-founder of Aquent, has said that the origins of the litl webbook lay in his observation that while his family was increasingly using web applications, their home computer was made for pre-web scenarios.

== Engineering partners ==
The industrial design of the litl webbook was made by Fuseproject with engineering design by MOTO Development Group. The FIC manufactures the device.

== Operating system ==
Litl OS is a cloud-oriented operating environment of the Litl webbook.

=== User interface philosophy ===
The litl OS interface removes several conventional elements of general-purpose desktop environments. Litl states that a set of principles were developed to guide the design of the interface, including using a rule that any computer task that had the word "management" next to it was removed.

=== User interface structure ===
Litl OS's user interface utilizes graphic elements called "cards" to organize browsing sessions and content instead of the tabs and menus found on conventional desktops.

Flicking through cards in an inverted-V position is done using a blue-colored click-wheel (called the "litl wheel") on the litl webbook or remote control. The card concept, easel mode and general usage of the interface are demonstrated in litl's videos.

The interfaces to some web content are also customized by litl or third parties to integrate with litl OS and are referred to as litl channels. Litl OS's optional display method for RSS feeds is also referred to as a "litl channel". Customizations and settings are minimal in keeping with the design goals of simplicity and ease of use.

=== Software details ===
The underlying operating system is a mobile/embedded distribution of Ubuntu provided by Canonical. The user interface is written largely in Mozilla's dialect of JavaScript using the gjs binding to access GNOME and Clutter UI elements. litl automatically performs nightly software updates, and the OS stores browser cards, web channels, settings, and contacts online at Amazon S3 using a web service running on Google's App Engine and the Django framework. Open source components of the operating system's source code can be obtained on DVD from litl.

== Specifications ==
Model	Nov 2009
Release date	November 4, 2009
Model name	litl webbook
OS	litl OS
Display	Matte 12.1 inch AFFS LCD WXGA display (1280×800) with LED backlighting and a 178° field of view
Front side bus	533 MHz
Processor	1.86 GHz Intel AtomTM Z540 Processor (512KB L2 Cache)
Memory	1 GB 533 MHz DDR2 SDRAM
Graphics	Intel Integrated Graphics Media Accelerator 500
Chipset	Intel US15W
Storage	Local: Compact Flash 2 GB SLC local cache Internet: main storage is provided on the web by Amazon S3 accessed via a custom web service running on Google's App Engine with the Django framework.
Ports	HDMI (Type A); USB 2.0 (1); Audio jack (1 line out); AC adapter connector
Battery	3-cell 28-watt-hour lithium-ion battery
Camera	Built in 300kP, 640×480 VGA webcam
Microphone	Built in
Wireless	802.11 b/g PIFA/Gain: 0.67 dBi; 2 Internal IR receivers compatible with litl remote
AC	120-240 V AC; DC 20 V @ 2 A
Weight	3.38 lb (1.53 kg)
Dimensions	1.06 in × 12.6 in × 9.25 in (27 mm × 320 mm × 235 mm)

== See also ==
- Webbook
- Netbook
