= Jocelyn Seagrave =

American film and television actress

- Occupation: Actress
- Years active: 1990–present
- Spouse: Ted Fundoukos (m. 1993)
- Children: 2
- Parents: Sterling Seagrave (father); Wendy Law-Yone (mother)
- Relatives: Gordon Seagrave (paternal grandfather)

Jocelyn Seagrave is an American film and television actress, best known for playing Julie Camaletti on Guiding Light and Jessica Mitchell on Fox's Pacific Palisades.

== Early life ==
Seagrave's father was American author and historian Sterling Seagrave and her paternal grandfather, Gordon Stifler Seagrave, was the author of Burma Surgeon. Seagrave's mother, Wendy Law-Yone, was born in 1947 in Mandalay, Burma, she was raised and educated in Bangkok, Thailand is now living in the United States. Seagrave has English, Chinese and Burmese ancestry on her maternal side. Her maternal grandfather, Edward Michael Law-Yone, was a journalist and writer, as well as the founder of The Nation, once the leading English-language newspaper in Burma. Seagrave grew up in Thailand and later in the US. She studied martial arts, and earning her black belt in Tae Kwon Do, and English literature at the University of Virginia.

== Personal life ==
In 1993, Seagrave married Ted Fundoukos.

== Filmography ==
Film
Year	Film	Role	Notes
1996	If Looks Could Kill	Amanda	TV; AKA If Looks Could Kill: From the Files of "America's Most Wanted"; AKA If Looks Could Kill: The John Hawkins Story
1996	Assault on Dome 4	Lily Moran (Chases' Wife)	TV; AKA Chase Moran
1997	Moonbase	Dana Morgan	
2000	Yup Yup Man	Jillian	AKA Dark Justice
2003	Thoughtcrimes	June McAllister	AKA Clairvoyance (French Canadian TV title)
2005	A Lot Like Love	Bridget’s BFF	Uncredited
Television
Year	Title	Role	Notes
1990	Designing Women	Sylvie	1 episode ("Payne Grows Up")
1990	The Hogan Family (formerly Valerie)	Janet Reynolds	1 episode
1990	They Came from Outer Space	Molly Meecham	1 episode ("The Beauty Contest")
1991–1994	Guiding Light	Julie Camalletti	Series regular from 1991 to 1994
1994	The George Carlin Show	Vicki	1 episode
1994	Days of Our Lives	Tanya Hampstead	1994
1995	Silk Stalkings	Elizabeth "Liz" Faraday	1 episode
1995	Pointman	Lillie	2 episodes ("Take the Points", "Adios Roberto")
1996	Savannah	Rita Winsler	Unknown Episodes
1996	Wings	Princess Fala	1 episode ("A Tale of Two Sister Cities")
1997	Pacific Palisades	Jessica Mitchell	13 episodes
1998	Fantasy Island	Leslie Wolf	1 episode
1999	Charmed	FBI Agent Ashley Fallon	1 episode ("The Wendigo")
2001	V.I.P.	Patty Del Florio	1 episode ("Val on Fire")
