= Bei Bei Shuai =

Chinese immigrant to the United States

Bei Bei Shuai (Chinese: 帅贝贝) is a Chinese immigrant to the United States who became the subject of international public attention from 2011 to 2013, when the authorities of the state of Indiana charged her with murder and attempted feticide after her suicide attempt allegedly resulted in the death of the fetus with which she was pregnant. In Britain, The Guardian described Shuai's case, as well as those of other women who lose their pregnancies in cases of maternal drug addiction or a suicide attempt, as part of a "creeping criminalisation of pregnancy across America".

== Suicide attempt ==
Shuai, a Shanghai native, immigrated to the U.S. in the early 2000s with her then-husband. Years later, she entered into an affair with a married coworker. By late 2010, after her marriage fell apart, she became pregnant by the coworker. After their breakup and her severe depression, Shuai attempted suicide by taking rat poison. She survived, but the fetus died on 3 January 2011 – 33 weeks after her conception, ten days after the poisoning and two days after its birth in an emergency cesarean section.

== Criminal proceedings ==
On 14 March 2011, Shuai was charged with the murder and attempted feticide of her child, and was jailed for 435 days. In May 2012, the Indiana Supreme Court declined to dismiss the charges against her, but allowed her release on bail.

Shuai declined a plea deal that would have her plead guilty to the feticide charge (with a sentence of up to 20 years imprisonment) in return for the withdrawal of the murder charge. She faced a trial for murder with a possible sentence of 45 years to life imprisonment. In June 2012, the prosecution filed a motion to admonish her lawyer, Linda Pence, for prejudicing the potential jury pool by conducting a public campaign for the support of her client. This caused alarm among defense lawyers nationwide, one of whom criticized the motion as a possible attempt at intimidation or to prevent Pence from raising money for her client; chief prosecutor Terry Curry denied this.

In 2013 Shuai pled guilty to a misdemeanor charge of criminal recklessness and was released, having been sentenced to time served. Prosecutor Terry Curry said of the law under which she was initially charged for murder: "There was never any intention to monitor pregnancies."

== Legal context ==
Shuai's case was the first in the history of Indiana in which a woman was prosecuted for murder due to a pregnancy loss after a suicide attempt while pregnant. The feticide statute under which she was also prosecuted was intended, when enacted in 1979, to cover acts by violent third parties such as abusive boyfriends and drunk drivers. Women's groups in the U.S. warned that Shuai's prosecution could set a precedent for criminalizing a pregnant woman's actions, such as smoking or drinking, or having a miscarriage.

At least 38 U.S. states have similar "fetal homicide" laws, which are increasingly used to prosecute the pregnant women themselves. Recent similar cases in other states include that of Rennie Gibbs (charged with murder in Mississippi for having a stillborn daughter while addicted to cocaine) and at least 40 cases of pregnant women charged in Alabama under a "chemical endangerment" statute originally intended to protect children from the fumes of illicit meth labs run by their parents.

== See also ==
- Purvi Patel
