= Assault on Dome 4 =

- Directed by: Gilbert Po
- Written by: Hesh Rephun
- Produced by: Jimmy Lifton; Brian Shuster
- Starring: Joseph Culp; Bruce Campbell; Jocelyn Seagrave; Brion James
- Cinematography: David Mackay
- Edited by: Kirk M. Morri
- Music by: Peter Waldman
- Distributed by: Avatar Filmworks; The Sci-Fi Channel
- Release dates: October 8, 1996 (United Kingdom); February 15, 1997 (United States)
- Running time: 91 minutes
- Country: United States
- Language: English

Assault on Dome 4 is a 1996 American science-fiction film directed by Gilbert Po and starring Joseph Culp, Bruce Campbell, Jocelyn Seagrave, and Brion James. The film was written by Hesh Rephun.

== Premise ==
Intergalactic extremist Alex Windham (Bruce Campbell) has seized control of Dome 4, a scientific outpost on another planet, after escaping from a penal colony on Mars. Windham is forcing the staff of Dome 4 to construct new weapons that he can use to destroy his enemies, but he doesn't know that one of his captives is married to interstellar lawman Chase Moran (Joseph Culp) — and Moran will allow no harm to come to his wife.

== Cast ==
- Joseph Culp as Chase Moran (Peace Keeper)
- Bruce Campbell as Alex Windham
- Jocelyn Seagrave as Lily Moran (Chase's Wife)
- Brion James as Chairman
- Ray Baker as Dan Block, Chief of Staff
- Jack Nance as Mellow (Dome 4 Oldtimer)
- Mark Bringleson as Sigmund (Windham Henchman)
- James Lew as Quaid (Windham Henchman)
- Jay Arlen Jones as Goon #1
- Rudolf Weber as Goon #2
- Matthew Chontos as Goon #3 / Peace Keeper #3
- Shawn Hoffman as Peace Keeper #1
- Brandon Scott Peterson as Peace Keeper #2
- Michael Auteri as Bob Bowen (Dome 4 Administrator)
- B.J. Barie as JD
