= Brian Sun =

American lawyer from California (born 1954)

Brian Alfred Sun
- Born: Brian Alfred Sun; August 12, 1954 (age 72); Monterey, California, U.S.
- Education: JD, University of Southern California
- Occupation: Trial Lawyer

Brian Sun
- Chinese: 孫自華
Transcriptions
Standard Mandarin
- Hanyu Pinyin: Sūn Zìhuá

Brian Alfred Sun (born August 12, 1954) is an American trial lawyer and partner of the law firm Norton Rose Fulbright in the Los Angeles office. His areas of practice are white collar criminal defense, LA-based entertainment litigation, and political sagas, and has been involved in high-profile criminal trials.

== Early career ==
Sun went to the University of Southern California for his undergraduate studies and for law school. In 1976, he graduated magna cum laude from University of Southern California and obtained his juris doctor degree in 1979. His work experience in law school included internships at the Securities and Exchange Commission and US Attorney's Office, both experiences helped him develop an interest in criminal law. After his graduation, Brian clerked for the Honorable A. Andrew Hauk, United States District Court Judge for the Central District of California. In 1982, Brian became an Assistant United States Attorney, where he prosecuted drug and related money laundering crimes. The latter experience would be put to use when he gave Congressional testimony to Congress on the subject in 1982 and helped draft a bill to counter such money laundering. Between 1984 and 1986, he served as the section chief of the Financial Investigations Unit for the United States Department of Justice.

== Espionage and foreign government influence cases ==
The Justice Department investigated fundraising activities related to the 1996 election campaigns, leading to allegations of a covert plot by the Chinese government to influence American politics. Sun represented Democratic Party fundraiser Johnny Chung one of the key figures subject to the investigation. Chung was charged with funneling illegal campaign contributions through use of straw donors for the Clinton reelection campaign. As part of a plea agreement, Chung pleaded guilty to charges of tax evasion, bank fraud, and conspiracy related to the illegal contributions and although faced with 37 years was able to avoid any prison time.

Sun formed part of the team that represented Wen Ho Lee, who in 2000 was accused by the US government of espionage. He led the civil suit side of legal efforts, charging the Department of Energy for violation of Lee's privacy in a lawsuit. The criminal case against Lee later ended with his release and an apology from the federal judge who presided over the proceedings to Lee for unfair treatment. Lee initiated his civil action against the government for invasion of privacy in 1999 and settled in 2006 for $1,645,000, with five media organizations paying for half the settlement amount. Sun noted to The New York Times that the settlement had the unusual stipulation imposed by the government that the government half of the settlement amount could not go to Lee but would instead go to pay "lawyers' fees, litigation costs, and taxes."

The particular expertise Sun gained in the Wen Ho Lee defense on the rules for the disclosure of classified information in criminal cases was put to use again in 2003 when he defended James J. Smith, an FBI counterintelligence agent on the China squad, who was charged with providing classified information to Katrina Leung, a businesswoman in Los Angeles.

The US Senate Subcommittee on Investigations published a report in 2010 detailing the findings of a probe on transfers of corruption tainted funds from African countries. Sun represented an American lawyer alleged by the committee to have helped the son of Equatorial Guinea President Teodoro Obiang Nguema in making transfers when the attorney was called to testify before the Senate panel.

== Entertainment business law ==
In Blix Street Records v. Gelbard, a licensing dispute between Blix Street Records and Eva Cassidy Partners, a business partnership that included the parents of Eva Cassidy, Sun represented Eva Cassidy Partners.

Sun was criminal counsel to Elie Samaha during an FBI investigation tied to his dispute with Intertainment, a German financier of movies produced under his company Franchise Pictures.

== White collar criminal defense ==
In the wake of the 1994 Orange County bankruptcy, several public officials faced criminal and civil charges including Steve E. Lewis, the then auditor-controller of the county, who was represented by Sun.

Sun represented Mike Carona, a former sheriff of Orange County, who was put on trial for conspiracy and mail fraud charges. The government's case relied on damning statements made by Carona while taped by a government informant. Sun portrayed the statements made on the tapes as false chest thumping and argued the government witnesses were white collar felons looking to escape punishment by testifying against Carona. The outcome was favorable to Carona who was acquitted of five of the six charges and convicted of the remaining charge of witness tampering. Carona called the acquittals an "absolute miracle."
