= Mun Charn Wong =

American businessman

- Traditional Chinese: 黃門贊
- Simplified Chinese: 黄门赞
Transcriptions
Standard Mandarin
- Hanyu Pinyin: Huáng Ménzàn
Yue: Cantonese
- Jyutping: Wong^{4} Mun^{4} Zaan^{3}
- IPA: [wɔŋ˩ mun˩.tsan˧]

Mun Charn Wong (Chinese: 黃門贊; January 24, 1918 – September 17, 2002) was an American businessman. Wong served in the U.S. Army Air Force during World War II along with his friend, Wah Kau Kong, the first Chinese American fighter pilot. He played football on the Air Force team and was a noted quarterback. After the war, Wong became a successful life insurance executive for the Transamerica Corporation. In 1989, the company recognized him as a "Legend of Transamerica", the highest honor awarded by the company.

Wong was active in his community, serving as president of several Chinese cultural organizations and on the board of the Cerebral Palsy Association. In his free time, Wong enjoyed playing with celebrity golfers, and his amateur team won the 1987 U.S. Open Preview Pro Am golf tournament with the help of Larry Ziegler. Throughout the years, Wong kept Kong's memory alive, publishing an educational booklet, working with U.S. Senator Daniel Akaka to educate the public, participating in a television program about Kong on KHON-TV, and giving interviews to historians. To preserve Kong's memory, Wong helped establish the Wah Kau Kong Memorial Award Scholarship in Aerospace Studies at the University of Hawaii.

== Early life ==
Mun Charn Wong was born in Honolulu, Hawaii on January 24, 1918. He was raised on the island of Oahu along with four brothers and two sisters. Wong attended Ka'ahumanu Elementary School and Washington Intermediate School, and graduated from McKinley High School in 1936. He studied chemistry at the University of Hawaiʻi and was a member of the university chapter of the ROTC and the Hawaii National Guard. Wong graduated from UH in 1940 with a Bachelor of Science degree.

== Military service ==
After college, Wong joined the U.S. Army Air Force, where he was eventually promoted to the rank of lieutenant colonel. Long's decision to join the Air Force was inspired by that of his childhood friend, Wah Kau Kong. During World War II, Wong was stationed across Western Europe and flew several missions over Germany. Wong played football on the Air Force team and was a noted quarterback. Although he had never played football before joining the Air Force, Wong tried out for the team in 1943; 300 players showed up and 36 were chosen, with Wong making the team. Coach Captain Charles Erb, Jr. helped improve his game, and his skills were noticed:

this slender, unimposing chap has been coming along fast under Coach Erb's tutelage. His specialty is the rifling of a forward pass. Wong is one of those gridiron technicians who can add airmail to special delivery, to the great delight of the fans who like their football out in the open.

In 1944, Wong learned of the demise of his friend, Wah Kau Kong, who had flown 14 missions with two kills before becoming engaged in an air battle with a German fighter pilot over Blomberg, Germany. However, no further information was available. Determined to find out what happened to Kong, and out of respect for Kong's family, Wong vowed to discover details of the duel and return any of his friend's belongings to the Kong family. Thus, Wong embarked on his own mission to Blomberg with the permission of his commanding officer. Through interviews of local residents, Wong was able to find the specific location that Kong's P-51 Mustang (the "Chinaman's Chance") was shot down. Wong made contact with the man who carried Kong's body from the crash site and was able to recover his friend's remains, sending them home to Honolulu for proper burial.

== Career ==
Wong spent two decades in life insurance, beginning in 1953 with Lawrence Takeo Kagawa's Security Insurance Agency, which later became known as Occidental Underwriters of Hawaii as part of the Transamerica Life company. Wong was immediately successful, achieving the Million Dollar Round Table and Leading Producers Club in just his first year. In September 1989, Wong attended the Transamerica convention in Stockholm, Sweden where he was named the "Legend of Transamerica," the highest honor bestowed by the company. Wong was one of only twelve life insurance agents to be named a legend in the history of Transamerica Occidental Life Insurance Company.

== Personal life ==
Wong was married to Mew Choy, and together they raised four sons and two daughters. One of Wong's eight grandsons, exotica musician and composer Randy Wong, credits his grandfather with giving him his initial interest in the music genre. Mun Charn Wong sold life insurance to exotica pioneer Arthur Lyman, and he used to take his grandson to see Lyman perform on Friday nights. Wong enjoyed golf and was known to play with notable PGA golfers. In 1986, Wong played with Larry Ziegler and a team of amateurs to win the '87 U.S. Open Preview Pro Am golf tournament against competing team captains Johnny Miller, George Archer, and Gil Morgan.

Wong died in Honolulu on September 17, 2002, at the age of 84. His final resting place is in the National Memorial Cemetery of the Pacific.

== Associations ==
Wong was president of the Wong Kong Har Tong society from 1959-1960 and the president of the Association of Life Underwriters of Hawaii in 1962. He was also on the board of the Cerebral Palsy Association, and belonged to several fraternal and service organizations, including the Shriners, the Masons, Lions Clubs International, and Rotary International.

== Publications ==
- Mun Charn Wong (1977). The World of Mun Charn Wong: The challenge of change, LUA Convention '77 (Videorecording). Kensington, New South Wales: Life Underwriters Association Convention and Prudential Video Productions.
- "Power Phrases That Sell Money". (May 1988). Insurance Sales 131, pp. 17–18.
- Wah Kau Kong: America's First Chinese-American Fighter Pilot (1993). With Dean C. Sensui.
- Ray Lovell (host), Wah Kau Kong (subject), Mun Charn Wong (1995-02-21). Fighter Pilot (Ray Lovell's Journal) (Television program). Honolulu, Hawaii: KHON-TV. "Profile of America's first Chinese-American fighter pilot, Wah Kau Kong."

== Further resources ==
- Los Angeles Examiner Negatives Collection, 1950-1961. (1951-08-23) Air Force Convention, 1951. Public domain image of Mun Charn Wong.
- Men and Women of Hawaii; A Biographical Dictionary of Noteworthy Men and Women of Hawaii. Vol. 9. Honolulu: Star-Bulletin Print. Co. 1972. p. 623.
- Wong, Kevin Scott (2005). Americans First: Chinese Americans and the Second World War. Harvard University Press. ISBN 0-674-01671-8.
