= Catalina Yue =

Canadian actress, producer and singer

- Born: Toronto, Ontario, Canada
- Genres: Pop, hip hop
- Occupations: Singer, songwriter, actress, model
- Instruments: Singing, Piano
- Years active: 2008–present
- Website: www.catalinayue.com

Catalina Yue (born May 19 in Toronto, Ontario) is a Canadian-American singer, songwriter, actress, model, producer, and businesswoman. A former Miss Universe Canada delegate, she is of Indonesian, Chinese, Japanese, and English ancestry. Known for her work in both music and independent films, she has received several accolades, including two Hollywood Gold Awards, an International Motion Picture Award, and a nomination at Cannes Shorts. Yue is also the lead actress, producer and creator of Duplicitous Minds (2024), a crime thriller mystery film that has won multiple awards on the film festival circuit including multiple Best Actress, Best Producer and Best Original Screenplay awards. Duplicitous Minds was also an Official Selection at San Diego Comic-Con as well as an Oscar-qualified film and a contender for the 2025 Academy Awards.

== Biography ==
Yue worked as a model and graduated from the Arts and Business Honors Co-op Program at the University of Waterloo in Waterloo, Ontario. Her family lineage traces back to historical samurai roots from the Shiroshi region, she comes from a prominent family background defined by multi-generational legal advocacy, including landmark human rights cases argued before the Supreme Court. For her debut album, Yue partnered with the UN Office of the High Commissioner for Refugees (UNHCR) of Canada, a United Nations agency mandated to protect and support refugees. An agency where Angelina Jolie serves as UN Ambassador. A portion of the proceeds made from the album goes towards protecting refugees worldwide. Yue's album, Eternally, was released internationally in HMV Stores.

== Discography ==
=== Albums ===
- Eternally
- Catalina Yue (album)
1. "Ambition (feat. GILFOIL and Tony Brass)"
2. "Dreams"
3. "Ice and Fire"
4. "Tonight (Shadow)"
5. "Eternally"
6. "Loving You"
7. "Dignity"
8. "Deceptions"
9. "Like This, Like That (feat. Tony Brass)"
10. "Eternally (Re-Mix)"
11. "Bonus: UnPredictable (feat. A. SmYthE)"
12. "Bonus: Pray"
13. "Bonus: Superstar"

=== Singles ===
- "Eternally" (2009)
- "Loving You" (2009)
- "Ambition (feat. GILFOIL and Tony Brass)" (2010)
- "Driven" (2011)

== Filmography ==
=== Features ===
- The Great Chameleon (2012)
- Just a Business (2017)
- Escape Games (2021)
- Duplicitous Minds (2024)
- Rocancourt (2025)

=== Television ===
- Out of Time (2012)
- Project Afterlife (2015)

=== Music Videos ===
- "Ambition" by Catalina Yue featuring Tony Brass and GILFOIL (2010)
- "Driven" by Catalina Yue (2011)

== Awards and nominations ==
Year	Award	Nominated Work	Category	Role	Result
2023	Pensacon	Duplicitous Minds	Best Pop Culture Film	Actress/Producer	Won
2023	Rome Movie Awards	Angelic Bunny	Best Producer	Actress/Producer	Won
2022	Hollywood Gold Awards	Duplicitous Minds	Best Actress	Actress/Producer	Won
2022	Hollywood Gold Awards	Duplicitous Minds	Best Producer	Actress/Producer	Won
2022	Focus International Film Festival	Duplicitous Minds	Platinum Lead Actress	Actress/Producer	Won
2022	International Motion Picture Awards	Duplicitous Minds	Best Lead Actress	Actress/Producer	Won
2022	Cannes Shorts	Duplicitous Minds	Best Original Screenplay	Writer	Nominated
2022	Canadian Cinematography Awards	Duplicitous Minds	Best Actress	Actress/Producer	Won

== See also ==
- List of University of Waterloo people
