= Wah Kau Kong =

United States Army Air Forces officer

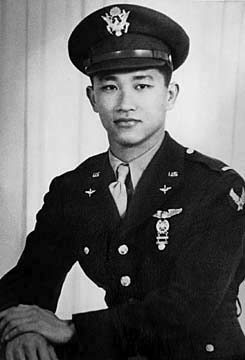
- Born: January 17, 1919; Honolulu, Hawaii
- Died: February 22, 1944 (aged 25) over Blomberg, North Rhine-Westphalia, Germany
- Burial place: National Memorial Cemetery of the Pacific
- Military career
- Allegiance: United States of America
- Branch: United States Army Air Forces
- Service years: 1942–44
- Rank: Second Lieutenant
- Units: 353rd Fighter Squadron; 354th Fighter Group
- Conflicts: World War II
- Awards: Purple Heart; Air Medal

Wah Kau Kong
- Traditional Chinese: 江華九
- Simplified Chinese: 江华九
Transcriptions
Standard Mandarin
- Hanyu Pinyin: Jiāng Huájiǔ
Yue: Cantonese
- Jyutping: Gong^{1} Waa^{4} Gau^{2}
- IPA: [kɔŋ˥ wa˩.kɐw˧˥]

Wah Kau Kong (Chinese: 江華九; January 17, 1919 – February 22, 1944) was the first Chinese American fighter pilot. Born in Honolulu, Hawaii, Kong became a chemist after graduating from the University of Hawaii and joined the United States Army Air Forces after the Attack on Pearl Harbor.

After completing flight school, Kong became a P-51 Mustang fighter pilot in England. He claimed 1.5 victories before being killed in action on a mission over Germany in late February 1944. In 1994, he was posthumously honored in the congressional record by Hawaiian Senator Daniel Akaka, who shared his story on the Senate floor.

== Early life ==
Kong was born on January 17, 1919, in Palama, a neighborhood of Honolulu, Hawaii. He was one of the five children of Yip Hoon Kong and May Wong Shee Kong. He graduated from McKinley High School in 1936.

Kong studied at the University of Hawaii, from which he graduated in 1940 with a bachelor's degree in chemistry, with honors. During his time at the university, Kong participated in the ROTC program. He competed in swimming, basketball, and track, while also taking flying lessons. Kong was working towards his master's degree in chemistry when he volunteered for military duty in early 1942, after the Attack on Pearl Harbor.

== Military career ==
He recorded the highest national score in his entrance examination and was accepted into the aviation cadet training program. Kong graduated from flight school in May 1943, becoming the first Chinese American fighter pilot. He subsequently trained on the P-39 Airacobra, and on October 23 Kong boarded a convoy for England.

He was assigned to the 353rd Fighter Squadron of the 354th Fighter Group at RAF Boxted, flying a P-51B Mustang, which he named "Chinaman's Chance" on one side and "No Tickee No Washee" on the other. On February 11, 1944, Kong claimed his first victory, an Fw 190, while returning from a bomber escort mission to Frankfurt, which was his twelfth mission. His victory was mentioned in Time magazine on February 28.

=== Final mission ===
On his fourteenth mission, Kong was shot down over Blomberg, Germany on February 22. Kong shared in a kill of a Messerschmitt Me 410 with squadron leader Jack T. Bradley and was apparently hit by a stray bullet by the aircraft's rear gunner as Kong finished the plane off. Kong's aircraft exploded and disintegrated in the air, and his remains were buried by the Germans two days later.

In the early summer of 1945, after the end of the war in Europe, his childhood friend, Mun Charn Wong located his remains which were then re-buried at the Netherlands American Cemetery. After the war, Wau Kau Kong was re-buried in the National Memorial Cemetery of the Pacific. His friend Wong initiated the Wah Kau Kong Memorial Award Scholarship at the University of Hawaii in his honor.

=== Military awards ===
Kong's military decorations and awards include:

Badge	Pilot Badge		
1st row	Purple Heart		Air Medal
2nd row	American Campaign Medal	European-African-Middle Eastern Campaign Medal w/one bronze service star for the Air Offensive, Europe campaign.	World War II Victory Medal
Unit Award	Presidential Unit Citation		

== See also ==
- Art Chin, Chinese-American ace fighter pilot
