= Zhao Suikang =

Chinese-American artist

- Born: Shanghai, China
- Education: School of Visual Arts
- Website: www.zhaosuikang.com

Zhao, Suikang (赵穗康) is a Chinese-American artist who works on different media and genres including painting, sculpture, site-specific installation, interdisciplinary art and monumental public art projects.

== Early life ==
Zhao was born in Shanghai, China in 1956. He went to Haifeng farm after staying at home for three and half years of self-education after graduating from middle school. He went to the countryside as part of the Chinese re-education program of the time, and was part of the first generation of Chinese students who attended college after 13 years of closure of higher education during the Cultural Revolution.

In 1979, he went to study at the Art Department, Shanghai Normal College. Upon his graduation in 1983, he was assigned a teaching job at Shanghai No.6th Normal School in 1983. A year later he was expelled from the school, becoming one of few jobless independent artists at the time in China. Zhao left China and went to graduate school at the Academy of Art College in San Francisco in 1986. Dissatisfied with the program, he dropped out, and left San Francisco for New York in 1987. From 1988-1990, Zhao enrolled in the graduate program at the School of Visual Arts, where he received the MFA degree. Zhao joined as a faculty member at the Fine Arts Department off the Fashion Institute of Technology, State University of New York in 1996.

== Career ==
After his relocation to the United States in 1986 and upon his graduation from the School of Visual Arts in 1990, Zhao was one of the first artists trying to transform Bushwick, Brooklyn into an artist's community. While in Bushwick he worked and exhibited extensively, producing many sculptures and installations over the following six years. In 1996, he created his first earth art project for the Djerassi Foundation in California during a temporary artist's residency. A year later, he had his first major solo exhibition at the Neuberger Museum of Art in 1997. Throughout his career Zhao has received many awards, including the New York Foundation for the Arts, the Pollock-Krasner Foundation, the New York State Council on the Arts, and the Individual Artist Media Production Award.

Since 1998, Zhao has created numerous, large-scale, permanent artworks for the public all over the country. Many of Zhao's public art projects involve the general public.

== Works ==
Zhao has done many paintings, sculptures, and media-site-specific installations that involve moving images and sound, which includes:

Public Artwork

- The Gatevine 2016 A permanent wall sculpture extends on 800 ft-long retaining wall on West Ave. city of Norwalk, CT. The artwork used the words collected from residents.
- Skin of Languages 2014. A permanent wall sculpture with layers of languages at Nuskin Headquarter, Provo, Utah.
- Taokonick 2013. A series of permanent artworks in different locations for Engine 38 firehouse, Tacony, PA. The artworks capture the grittiness and romance of firefighting with historical detail, and reverence towards the community.
- We have a dream 2011. Three permanent artworks that work with residents at Johnson County Juvenile Detention Center, Kansas. 1, working with residents, a 96' relief on retaining wall by entrance, 2, glass security window with writings from residents, 3, glass installation at entrance, and other 4 rooms.
- Wisdom of Rainbow & Knowledge Exile 2009. Two permanent projects for the Marriott Library, University of Utah. Wisdom of Rainbow is in Atrium space. Knowledge Exile 50 books objects are placed in & outside of library.
- Winds of Aphrodite 2008 Kansas City Bartle Hall Convention Center North Dock project. Collaborated with Crawford architect KC. Architectural artwork locate at 12th Street & Broadway.
- Three permanent outdoors sculptures. for Central Phoenix / East Valley Light Rail Transit Stations. 2008. Hands: two cast bronze hand sculptures at Dorsey Station. Weaving Texts, two forged steel panels at Smith-Martin Station. Text Columns, two cast Fortom MG columns with glass at McClintock Station
- Script of Vine-a trilogy of prelude and fugue 2007 A permanent site-specific public art project for the University of Oregon Health and Counseling Center—Eugene, OR. The artworks consist of three parts and are in three different sites throughout the facility. Basic designed elements are writing that submitted by students and staff.
- Dreams of Sky 2005 A permanent site-specific public art project for Celentano School, New Haven, CT.
- Portland Pamphlets 1999 A permanent site-specific public art project for Oregon Bureau of General Service, City of Portland, OR
- Two outdoor site-specific projects 1996 at Djerassi Foundation, Woodside, CA. Floating Poetry deals with the memory of life and death. 68 floating objects are installed along two miles of the estate's creek. Burning Green is two rubber hand sculptures on a huge burned redwood tree. The rubber hands are etched written poetry in Chinese and English.

=== Media and installations ===
- La Pastorale—G major 2017 is an integrative sound installation that produces the harmonic G major triad. Three singing bowls are placed in different locations of the space, so that sound will be produced by chance either single or combine notes of G, B or D, which the vibration directly connects the body.
- Polyphonic Realities 1997 an integrated and interactive internet related sound installation.
- Internal Heliocentric Parallax 1996 An installation with synchronized computer and sound controlled slides projection on layered mash.
- Fumbling 1996 A sound and video sculpture.
- Mask of Identities 1994 Two mask objects with alternative dissolved slide projection.
- Impossibility of Intimacy 1997 an site specific installation.
- Bathroom 1996 A site specific installation with interactive sound, water and paint.
- Neighborhood 1995 A synthesis of sound installation and electronic performance. The impetus of the work springs from a recreation of the Celebration of Cultural Wars, which was staged on the site of the burning truck in 1994. The project was collaborated with artist Hu Bing.
- Hunted Stair 1994. Projected installation on industrial building in the Bushwick neighborhood in Brooklyn. Location: 47 Thames Street, Brooklyn, NY
- The Feast of Belshazzar 1994 A Dissolve controlled multi-slide projection and sound installation.
