= Lung float test =

The lung float test, also called the hydrostatic test or docimasia, is a controversial autopsy procedure used in determining whether lungs have undergone respiration. It has historically been employed in cases of suspected infanticide to help determine whether or not an infant was stillborn. In the test, lungs that float in water are thought to have been aerated, while those that sink are presumed to indicate an absence of air.

The test is not infallible and many factors can cause the test to give false positive or negative results. Decomposition may result in postmortem gas formation, allowing a non-aerated lung to float. During labor, air can be introduced to a deceased infant's lungs while moving through the birth canal. Lungs exposed to air do not always float. Große Ostendorf et al. showed the procedure gave a false result in 2% of cases. In a 1997 paper, J.J. Moar emphasises the risk of misdiagnosing live birth, writing that the "majority of new born infants seen at autopsy show signs of varying degrees of decomposition, as they are often found in garbage, wrapped in newspaper or plastic bags, or lying in an open field. Even microscopic putrefaction can cause unexpanded lungs to float, when gas formation may not be macroscopically apparent. Naturally, any attempts at resuscitation may partially expand the lungs of a new born infant, leading to further difficulty in establishing live birth."

The difference between the lungs of a foetus and those of an infant was noted by the Ancient Greek physician Galen. The lung float test was described in the 1670s by Hungarian botanist Károly Rayger and first performed in 1681. German physician Johannes Schreyer performed a lung float test in 1690.

The application of the lung float test to determine breathing and live birth has many spurious medico-legal considerations. In South Africa a foetus must have breathed to be considered a person under the law.

Lung float tests are also used by forensic pathologists to determine if a subject drowned.

== See also ==
- Born alive rule
- Neonaticide
