= Chemical endangerment =

Crime of exposing a child to a controlled substance

Chemical endangerment is the crime of exposing a child to a controlled substance or an environment in which it is produced. It was added to the Alabama legal code in 2006, with the intention of protecting children from methamphetamine laboratories. Since then, it has been used to prosecute women who give birth to children that test positive for harmful drugs and also THC, the active ingredient in marijuana.

== Definition ==
Section 26-15-3.2 of the Alabama legal code discusses the crime of "chemical endangerment of exposing a child to an environment in which controlled substances are produced or distributed." It is defined to be an act in which a person "knowingly, recklessly, or intentionally causes or permits a child to be exposed to, to ingest or inhale, or to have contact with a controlled substance, chemical substance, or drug paraphernalia." The crime is classified as a class C felony; if the child suffers serious injury, it is a class B felony; if the child dies as a result, it is a class A felony.

== Fetal personhood cases ==
The chemical endangerment law, which passed in 2006, was originally created as a means of protecting children from methamphetamine laboratories. Although the original wording of the law made no mention of unborn children, Alabama state prosecutors began filing charges against mothers who had used illegal drugs during their pregnancies, under the assumption that the definition of "environment" should include the womb, and that the definition of "child" should include the fetus. In 2006, Covington County resident Tiffany Hitson gave birth to a daughter who was found to have traces of cocaine and marijuana in her system, and Hitson was convicted of chemical endangerment shortly thereafter. Similar prosecutions have failed in other states: two Maryland women were convicted because their newborn babies tested positive for cocaine, but the convictions were overturned; a similar child abuse conviction in New Mexico was overturned on the grounds that a fetus is not a child. However, when Hope Elizabeth Ankrom appealed her chemical endangerment conviction using a similar argument, the Alabama Court of Criminal Appeals upheld her conviction, stating that "Not only have the courts of this State interpreted the term 'child' to include a viable fetus in other contexts, the dictionary definition of the term 'child' explicitly includes an unborn person or a fetus."

Between 2006 and 2012, approximately 60 new mothers were prosecuted under the chemical endangerment law. One case in particular attracted the attention of mainstream media, human rights groups, and addiction experts. In April 2008, Amanda Kimbrough gave birth to her son Timmy after only 25 weeks of pregnancy; Timmy died 19 minutes later. When Kimbrough tested positive for methamphetamine, which she admitted to having used once during her pregnancy, she was arrested, charged with chemical endangerment, and sentenced to 10 years in prison after pleading guilty. The National Advocates for Pregnant Women, the American Psychiatric Association, American Society of Addiction Medicine, and several other organizations prepared amicus briefs in support of both Ankrom and Kimbrough. They argued that the court's decisions were not supported or justified by scientific research, and that they were made without any understanding of the nature of drug addiction. Other critics argued that these court decisions detract from the rights and value of pregnant women.
