= One Child Policy (musician) =

Chinese-American electronic musician

- Birth name: Dennis Ruowei Cao (Chinese: 曹偌伟)
- Genres: Electronic; Ambient techno; Acid techno; House; Drum and bass; Techno; Industrial
- Years active: 2017–present
- Labels: Dian Nao
- Website: soundcloud.com/one-child-policy

Dennis Ruowei Cao (Chinese: 曹偌伟), better known as One Child Policy, is a Chinese-American electronic musician, record producer, and DJ based in Los Angeles.

== Career ==
Cao was raised by two electrical engineers brought up in China, who sparked his fascination with electronic music at an early age. In 2017, Cao formed a duo, "Belligerents", with Simonowsky to create the track "Crack99", which was featured on LA-based party and record label The Black Lodge's second compilation album and as XLR8R's 3 January 2018 track download. His work was included on Arca's Mutants Mixtapes Vol 1 and 2, which consist of tracks by Arca and artists from her Discord community.

Cao's debut EP, Cultural Transmissions, was released in November 2017 via Droid Behavior’s sister label VRV. Mixmag praised its "kinetic production [...] paired alongside a pensive aesthetic which aims to explore the artist’s Asian American heritage", rating it 8/10. It was also well received by Andrew Ryce of Resident Advisor, who called the lead single, "Only Me || 孝", "a track that'll get stuck in your head along with a lot of eerie synth work."

In late 2020, he debuted his electronic record label, Dian Nao (Chinese: 电脑; lit. 'electronic brain', meaning "computer"), with the two-track EP It Mirrored Me, which was featured on Apple Music's Editorial Techno Playlist, Magnetic Mag, and De Subjectivisten.

== Discography ==
=== EPs ===
- Cultural Transmissions (2017), VRV

=== Singles ===
- "Crack99" (2017), The Black Lodge − released on Spirits Of The Black Lodge Vol. 2 as "Belligerents" together with Simonowsky
- "Only Me || 孝" (2020) − also released on Arca's Mutant Mixtapes
- Hallucination Step (2020)
- It Mirrored Me / Absence (2020), Dian Nao
- Machine User (2024), Acid Camp Records − released on Acid Camp: 10 Year Anniversary

=== Remixes ===
- Rawdio – Trippin' (2019), Guangzhou Underground − released on Label Sampler Vol.4 & Come Together EP
- Melted Bodies − Ad People (2021) – released on Enjoy Yourself with Friends by Melted Bodies
