= Norman Liu =

Chinese-American executive President & CEO of Nordic Aviation Capital

Norman C.T. Liu
- Education: Harvard University (MBA); Yale University (BS)
- Occupation: Business executive
- Employer: Nordic Aviation Capital
- Title: President & CEO

Norman C.T. Liu
- Chinese: 柳澈漯
Transcriptions
Standard Mandarin
- Hanyu Pinyin: Liǔ Chè Tà

Norman C.T. Liu is a Chinese-American business executive and former Senior Advisor to ICBC Leasing based in Beijing, China. During the fall of 2021, he was named President & CEO of Nordic Aviation Capital, the world's largest regional aircraft leasing firm, with operations in Ireland, Singapore, Denmark, Dubai and Toronto. He led the restructuring of the firm’s fleet, operations and balance sheet to enable a successful merger with Dubai Aerospace in May 2025.

Liu also served as a Senior Advisor to Global Infrastructure Partners and currently is a Senior Advisor to Blackstone Credit & Insurance, a Board Member of GA Telesis , a Trustee of the ISTAT Foundation and an Adjunct Professor at the Graduate Business School of University College Dublin.

He was formerly the Chairman, President & CEO of GE Capital Aviation Services (GECAS) based in London and Singapore until his retirement in December 2016. He was a veteran of GE Capital, a primary unit of General Electric to which GECAS was grouped. He assumed the CEO position at GECAS in July 2009. GECAS was the world's largest aircraft financing firm during his tenure with AUM of over $55 billion.

Liu graduated from Yale in 1979 and obtained an MBA from Harvard in 1982.
