= Junying Yu =

American biologist

Junying Yu (born 1975) is a Chinese stem cell biologist. She is a researcher at the University of Wisconsin–Madison.

== Biography ==
Yu was born in 1975 in Zhejiang, China. In 1997, Yu graduated from the Department of Biology of Peking University. She then went to the United States to continue her research and obtained a PhD from the University of Pennsylvania in 2003.

In 2003, Yu joined James Thomson's lab at UW–Madison as a researcher. Yu is an important leader in developing novel method of reprogramming adult cells to create pluripotent cells which are not from embryonic stem cells. In Nov 2007, a study done by Yu et al. achieved the production of induced pluripotent stem cells by genetic reprogramming of human dermal fibroblasts (from a baby's foreskin). This groundbreaking result was published in Science.

== Recognition ==
Yu, along with Thomson and Shinya Yamanaka, was recognized as one of the "Person of the Year" for 2007 by the Time magazine.
