= Edward Michael Law-Yone =

Burmese journalist

- Born: February 5, 1911; Kamaing, Myitkyina District, British Burma
- Died: June 27, 1980 (aged 69); Silver Spring, Maryland
- Other names: Ed Law-Yone
- Occupations: Journalist, government official
- Known for: Founder and chief editor of The Nation
- Spouse: Eleanor Law-Yone
- Children: 3 sons, 3 daughters (including Wendy Law-Yone)

Edward Michael Law-Yone (Burmese pronunciation: [lɔjòʊɰ̃], nicknamed Ed Law-Yone; February 5, 1911 – June 27, 1980) was a Burmese journalist and official of Burma and then of the Burmese government-in-exile, as well as an author.

He was born in Kamaing, Myitkyina District (now part of Kachin State), British Burma. Educated at Saint Peters' School (now Basic Education High School No. 9) in Mandalay, at 16 he went to work as a clerk in the Burma-China border frontier service. He joined the Burma Railways in 1930 as a probationer and by 1938 was in charge of the rates and commercial section, traveling in that year over the recently constructed Burma Road to survey the route proposed for linking the Burma and Yunnan-Indochina Railways. In August 1948, he founded The Nation, Burma's most influential English language newspaper, and served as its chief editor, until his 5-year detention, following Ne Win's coup d'état in 1962.

In a 1957 interview with American news broadcast See It Now, he said:

It will be realized that although we have a parliamentary form of government, Parliament is not, in fact, well-established in this country. There is a preponderance of a one-party rule, which to me, is in the long run, is as dangerous as having autocracy...I hold entirely with the view that power corrupts, that absolute power corrupts.

Law-Yone was one of the first recipients of the Ramon Magsaysay Award for Journalism, Literature and Creative Communication Arts, in 1959. The Nation was shut down in May 1963, the first to be closed by the new government.

In 1970, Law-Yone left Burma with his family. In exile, he lived near Lumpini Park in Bangkok, Thailand before settling in Silver Spring, Maryland. His daughter, Wendy Law-Yone, is a journalist and writer, and his granddaughter, Jocelyn Seagrave, is an actress.

Law-Yone was a member of the Executive Committee of the Union of Burma Boy Scouts, and was an active promoter of Scouting, taking the lead in fundraising activities and traveling to international Scouting meetings.
