= Jonathan A. Yuen =

American admiral (born 1961)

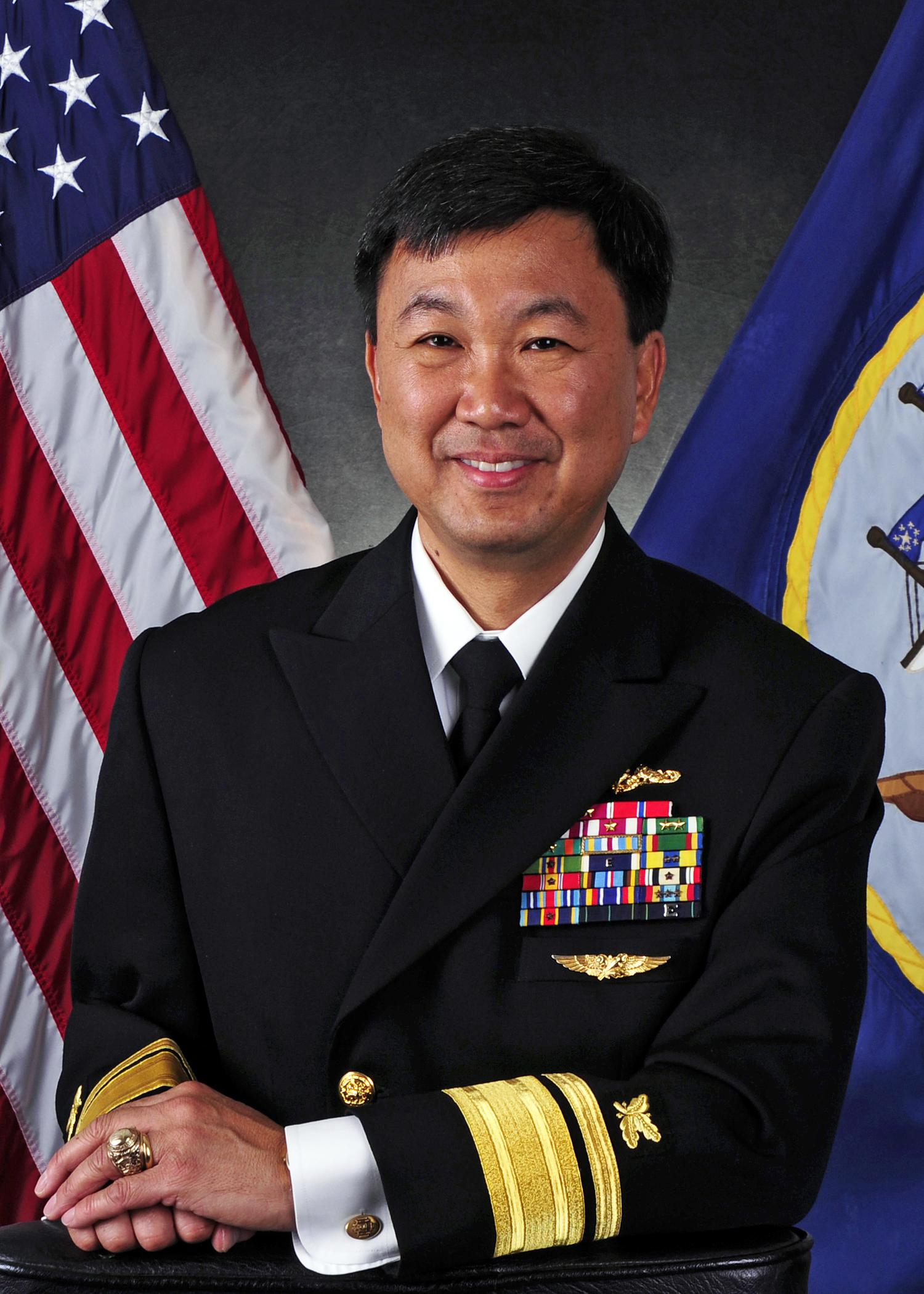
- Born: February 17, 1961 (age 65); San Francisco, California, U.S.
- Military career
- Allegiance: United States
- Branch: United States Navy
- Service years: 1983–2018
- Rank: Rear Admiral
- Commands: Naval Supply Systems Command
- Awards: Legion of Merit

Rear Adm. Jonathan Alex Yuen (born February 17, 1961) is a retired American admiral, who last served as the 47th chief of Supply Corps and commander of the Naval Supply Systems Command.

== Background and education ==
A native of San Francisco, Yuen is the grandson of Chinese immigrants who became naturalized American citizens. He graduated from Lowell High School in 1979. His father and several uncles served in the United States Army and Yuen had been accepted to both West Point and Annapolis, ultimately choosing the latter.

Yuen graduated with distinction from the United States Naval Academy in 1983. While a midshipman, he attended the U.S. Military Academy at West Point as an exchange student in the fall of 1981. He has a Master of Business Administration from The Wharton School of Business, University of Pennsylvania. He attended Executive Education Programs at the Stanford Graduate School of Business and the University of Virginia, Darden School of Business. He also attended the Navy Executive Business Course at the University of North Carolina's Kenan-Flagler Business School.

== Career ==
His Supply Corps sea duty assignments include tours on USS Narwhal (SSN 671) and USS Constellation (CV 64) and as supply officer on USS Nassau (LHA 4).

His shore assignments include Navy acquisition contracting officer intern; aide to the director of the Supply, Programs and Policy Division in the Office of the Chief of Naval Operations; career counselor and community manager, Navy Supply Corps Personnel; executive assistant, Defense Logistics Support Center, Defense Logistics Agency; executive officer, Naval Supply Systems Command (NAVSUP) Fleet Logistics Center Yokosuka; deputy commander of Corporate Operations, Naval Supply Systems Command; deputy commander for Ships and Submarines, NAVSUP Weapon Systems Support; fellow on the Chief of Naval Operations' Strategic Studies Group and deputy chief of staff for Logistics, Fleet Supply and Ordnance, U.S. Pacific Fleet.

His joint assignments include serving as deputy commander/chief of staff of the Joint Contracting Command - Iraq/Afghanistan, headquartered in the International Zone of Baghdad with 18 regional offices throughout both theaters. He also completed a Navy individual augmentee (IA) assignment as director, U.S. Central Command Deployment and Distribution Operations Center (CDDOC), Camp Arifjan, Kuwait.

A member of the Acquisition Professional Community, Yuen has earned supply warfare qualifications in submarine, aviation and surface warfare.

Yuen became commander, Naval Supply Systems Command and 47th chief of Supply Corps Oct. 3, 2013. Previously, he served as commander, NAVSUP Global Logistics Support, headquartered in San Diego, California.

Personal awards include Navy Distinguished Service Medal, four Legions of Merit, a Bronze Star, two Defense Meritorious Service Medals, two Meritorious Service Medals, three Navy and Marine Corps Commendation Medals, and two Navy and Marine Corps Achievement Medals, among unit and campaign commendations. On Oct. 2, 2015, he was officially designated by the Master Chief Petty Officer of the Navy as an honorary chief petty officer.
