= Lily Lee Chen =

Chinese-American politician

- Born: Li Wanrou (李琬若); May 27, 1936 (age 89); Tianjin, China
- Education: San Francisco State University (BA); University of Washington (MSW)
- Spouse: Paul Chen (1930-2019)
- Children: 2

Lily Lee Chen (born May 27, 1936) is an American politician and former mayor of Monterey Park, California. She was the first Chinese American woman mayor in the United States of America. Lily Lee Chen is a founding board member of Committee of 100.

== Early life and education ==
Chen was born on May 27, 1936, in the port city of Tianjin, China. She was the second daughter of Li Yaolin (李曜林) and Zhang Shuzhen (张淑眞).

Chen's father was a professor and member of the Kuomintang (KMT) during the Japanese occupation of China in the late 1930s. After the Chinese Communist Revolution in 1949, he fled with his family to Taiwan.

In 1957, Chen visited the U.S. as an ambassador as a part of the International Youth Leadership Program, a group established by the U.S. State Department to promote and strengthen relations between the U.S. and China.

Chen attended San Francisco State University majoring in communications. Subsequently, she earned her master's degree in social work at the University of Washington.

== Professional career ==
Chen served a 27-year career for the Los Angeles County Department of Public Social Services. She created the first APA (Asian Pacific American) human services program, the Asian Pacific Community Outreach Program, developing outreach centers. As Director of Social Services Planning and Resource Development for the county, Chen managed federal funding and planned human services programs for the 88 cities in LA County. Chen retired as an administrator of the Department of Children and Family Services in 1993.

In 1981, Chen made a first run for Monterey Park City Council. She lost by 28 votes, however rejected a recount.

In 1982, in accordance with the regular election cycle, Chen ran again for City Council. She worked with multiethnic communities and published a bilingual voter registration handbook. Chen won the election with 4,754 votes, the largest number of votes in Monterey Park history.

While serving as Mayor, Chen lobbied Coca-Cola to sponsor the field hockey games of the 1984 Olympics in Monterey Park, which was PRC China’s first participation in the Summer Olympics since 1952. Under her leadership, Monterey Park won the National Civic League’s All-America City Award in 1985, which was featured in USA Today.

== Recognitions ==
- In 1998, Secretary of State Madeleine Albright appointed Chen to the board of governors of the US State Department’s East-West Center.
- In 2017, The Los Angeles Times featured Chen in the article “On International Women’s Day, here are 8 L.A. Women You Should Know”.
- In 2018, Chen was the closing keynote speaker at the “Women: Retelling the China Stories” conference at the Yenching Global Symposium, Peking University.

== Personal life ==
Chen was married to Paul Chen, aerospace electrical engineer, on April 17, 1960.

Chen has two children. Her daughter is a medical director of radiation oncology at City of Hope/South Pasadena.
