= Portia Li =

Chinese-American journalist

- Born: Hong Kong
- Education: Utah State University (MS)
- Occupations: Journalist, newspaper publisher
- Known for: Founder of Wind Newspaper

Portia Li (李秀蘭; Lǐ Xiù Lán) is a Chinese-American journalist. Until 2020, she was a senior reporter in the Millbrae, California office of the World Journal, the largest Chinese-language newspaper in the United States. Li is known for the 2001 expose of a Chinatown extortion ring. She has also reported on the 2002 SARS (bird flu) crisis and the 2015 Ellen Pao gender discrimination lawsuit.

In 2020, Li founded the weekly Chinese-English bilingual Wind Newspaper / 風報, covering the San Francisco region. Li serves as publisher and editor.

== Biography ==
Li, a native of Hong Kong, is the daughter of a Hong Kong businessman. After graduating from journalism school in Taiwan, she worked for three years for Hong Kong's largest daily newspaper Oriental Daily News. Li came to the US in 1984, continued her education with a master's degree from Utah State University, and started reporting in San Francisco for the World Journal in 1986. She was one of the speakers at the Ascend conference sponsored by the Asian Pacific Islander American Public Affairs Association (APAPA), the Asian Studies Department of the City College of San Francisco, the Japan Policy Research Institute and the Center on the Pacific Rim at USF, and the Stanford Center for East Asia Studies. Li has twice been awarded for her journalism by the Northern California Chinese Media Association and the Society for Professional Journalists.

== Investigative and campaigning journalism ==
A Wall Street Journal leader column described Li as one of the "firebrand journalists" of the American ethnic press. Among the stories she has investigated was a series of fires in San Francisco in 2001 that destroyed restaurants owned by ethnic-Chinese businessmen. According to the Wall Street Journal, Li's interview with one of the owners who informed her that gang members had demanded protection money and her subsequent reports identifying gang links to the arson generated tips leading to the Federal Bureau of Investigation arrest of several suspects on charges of extortion. San Francisco Police Chief Fred Lau said, "Portia was going 120 miles an hour," during a press conference, "We said, 'Hey, maybe this [her investigation] is something that people are interested in.'"

Li is active in highlighting the issue of Chinese ethnic discrimination to Chinese communities worldwide in articles published by the World Journal. According to the Wall Street Journal column, Li raised questions about racial bias in her articles on behalf of Rep. David Wu, a Democrat from Oregon who was denied entry to the U.S. Energy Department by guards who questioned his nationality. She also challenged an inflammatory editorial likening the Chinese-American physicist Wen Ho Lee to "Fu Manchu". During his investigation, she published many articles described as helping to "galvanize the Chinese-American community". "Portia was way out in front," stated Policy Director of Chinese for Affirmative Action Ted Wang.

Reporters and editors from three Chinese-language American newspapers, including Li, received an apology in 2007 by then presidential hopeful Hillary Clinton for an apparent snub at a fund raiser when the reporters were considered "foreign press".

In 2015 Li covered the gender discrimination case brought by the Chinese-American executive Ellen Pao. According to Li it was one of the World Journal's top stories, measured by hits on the paper's website.
