= Wendy Law-Yone =

Burmese-born American author

- Born: April 1, 1947 (age 79); Mandalay, British Burma
- Occupation: writer
- Spouse: John Randall
- Children: Jocelyn Seagrave; Sean Seagrave; Chad O'Connor; Bess O'Connor
- Relatives: Edward Law-Yone (father)

Wendy Law-Yone (Burmese pronunciation: [lɔ́ jòʊɰ̃]; born 1947) is the critically acclaimed Burmese-born American author of A Daughter's Memoir of Burma (Columbia University Press, 2014), Golden Parasol (Chatto & Windus, 2013), The Road to Wanting (Chatto & Windus, 2010), Irrawaddy Tango (Knopf, 1994), and The Coffin Tree (Knopf, 1983).

== Biography ==
The daughter of notable Burmese newspaper publisher, editor and politician Edward Michael Law-Yone, Law-Yone was born in Mandalay but grew up in Rangoon. Her background is diverse, with one grandfather a merchant from Yunnan and another a colonial officer from Great Britain. Law-Yone states that she is "half Burman, a quarter Chinese and a quarter English".

Law-Yone has indicated that her father's imprisonment under the military regime limited her options in the country. She was barred from university, but not allowed to leave the country. In 1967, an attempt to escape to Thailand failed and she was imprisoned, but managed to leave Burma as a stateless person. She relocated to the United States in 1973, attending Eckerd College for comparative literature and modern languages before receiving a Carnegie Fellowship and settling in Washington, D.C. for thirty years. In 1987, she was the recipient of a National Endowment for the Arts Literature Award for Creative Writing. In 2002, she received a David T.K. Wong Creative Writing Fellowship from the University of East Anglia. Her novel The Road to Wanting was long-listed for the Orange Prize 2011. In 2015, she was Dürrenmatt guest professor at University of Bern, Switzerland.

Law-Yone cites as a strong influence on her writing career her father's love of language, noting that his work as the founder of Burmese English-language newspaper The Nation was a daily factor in her childhood.

== Selected bibliography ==
- The Coffin Tree (1983)
- Irrawaddy Tango (1993)
- The Road to Wanting (2010)
- Golden Parasol: A Daughter's Memoir of Burma (2013)
- Dürrenmatt and me. Eine Passage von Burma nach Bern (2021, German-English edition)
- Aung San Suu Kyi: Politician, Prisoner, Parent (2023)

== Sources ==
- Yoo, Nancy; Tamara Ho (2000). "Wendy Law-Yone". In King-Kok Cheung (ed.). Words Matter: Conversations with Asian American Writers. University of Hawaii Press. pp. 283–302. ISBN 0824822161.
