= Katrina Leung =

FBI Informant and Ministry of State Security agent (born 1954)

Katrina Leung (simplified Chinese: 陈文英; traditional Chinese: 陳文英; pinyin: Chén Wényīng; born 1954) is a former high value Federal Bureau of Investigation (FBI) informant and Ministry of State Security (MSS) agent who, on April 9, 2003, was indicted by the United States Department of Justice for "Unauthorized copying of national defense information with intent to injure or benefit a foreign nation". Her case was later dismissed on January 6, 2005, because of prosecutorial misconduct, but an appeal by the U.S. Attorney resulted in a plea bargain of guilty to lesser charges on December 16, 2005. She was alleged by the United States government to have contaminated twenty years of intelligence relating to the People's Republic of China, as well as critically compromising the FBI's Chinese counterintelligence program. She was known by a variety of aliases, including Chan Man Ying, Chen Wen Ying, Luo Zhongshan, and Parlor Maid.

== Early life ==
Leung immigrated to the United States in 1970 using a fake Republic of China passport stating that she was born on May 1, 1954, in Guangzhou. Leung enrolled at Washington Irving High School in New York City, New York, and graduated in June 1972. She became a permanent resident alien on August 7, 1972.

== Education ==
Leung attended and earned an undergraduate degree from Cornell University in 1976. She then went on to earn a Master of Business Administration from the University of Chicago. It was somewhere during this time as a student that Leung was contacted by the FBI for information on some of her acquaintances.

She was appointed by philanthropist Caroline Leonetti Ahmanson as President of the Los Angeles-Guangzhou Sister City Committee and raised funds for the Republican Party.

== Involvement with the FBI ==
In 1980, Leung moved to Los Angeles and occupied an apartment building which contained numerous tenants that were subjects of other FBI investigations. She developed a close relationship with a pro-PRC activist who was under FBI investigation for illegally transferring technology from the U.S. to the PRC. Leung became the general manager of an import-export company which in late 1980 had become the subject of an FBI investigation dealing with the illegal transfer of technology from the U.S. to the PRC. On February 10, 1981, the FBI launched an investigation into Leung, believing that she was engaging in clandestine intelligence-gathering on behalf of the PRC. Leung eventually left her job at the import-export company, closing the FBI investigation on her. The PRC activist was arrested in China, closing that investigation as well.

In 1982, FBI Special Agent James J. Smith re-opened the FBI investigation into Leung hoping that she could provide him with additional information on the PRC activist as well as other miscellaneous information. Smith was so impressed with the information Leung provided that he converted her into an FBI asset codename "Parlor Maid" in December of the same year.

=== Career as a double agent ===
On March 16, 1984, Leung became a U.S. citizen with the help of Smith. The FBI had developed a plan for her to be recruited by the Chinese Ministry of State Security as an asset working as a double agent for the United States. In June 1984, Leung was recruited by the MSS believing that she was a low-level source of information at the FBI's Los Angeles office. Leung began receiving money from the FBI to pay for her expenses (the majority going towards flights to and from China). She passed two polygraph examinations: one in September 1984 and one in June 1986.

Between 1985 and 1990, Leung's profile within the West Coast Chinese community and the FBI had risen significantly. Her connections within the community became so extensive that she entertained Chinese diplomatic officials and organized high-profile banquets for visiting PRC officials from the mainland. During this time, she met and charmed President of China Yang Shangkun who eventually became her patron. As a sign of her growing influence in the PRC, she advised the Chinese government in 1998 on a new location for their Los Angeles consulate.

Up to this point, Leung's reports were well received by the Central Intelligence Agency, and much of her reporting during this time had also been verified by a Chinese defector. A sign of her growing influence within the FBI could be seen when she was sent to China shortly after the Tiananmen Square Massacre to report on the country's political climate during a time when the country's information flow had virtually ceased.

In June 1990, the FBI learned that Leung had revealed to MSS officials the existence and location of a classified operation as well as classified details of the FBI's counterintelligence program. The FBI headquarters chief questioned Leung's handler Smith, who denied the allegations and successfully convinced his superior that she would never do such a thing without his authorization. Smith privately confronted Leung on May 31, 1991, about the unauthorized disclosure of information. In response, she told him that her Chinese handler "Mao" had discovered her double-agent identity and had coerced her into giving additional information.

In April 1991, the FBI obtained an audio recording of a conversation between a woman identifying herself as "Luo" and a known PRC intelligence official identifying himself as "Mao". Special Agent William Cleveland, Jr. was brought in to listen to the tape and immediately recognized the woman's voice as Leung's. Leung had, among other things, detailed without authorization the itinerary of a recent trip that Cleveland had taken with the State Department to the PRC. Cleveland immediately notified Smith of the breach and in May of the same year, the two traveled to FBI headquarters in Washington, D.C. for a high-level meeting concerning herself. In addition to the analyst’s recommendations, Smith defended the suspicious activities of Leung and managed to convince his superiors that terminating her as an asset was not the best course of action. The FBI accepted his recommendation based on his extensive experience handling Leung, as well as his experience in the FBI and the analyst's recommendation. Federal prosecutors alleged Leung engaged in a 20-year extra-marital affair with Smith. The MSS handler was Mao Guohua (毛国华) who is alleged to be the MSS's leading U.S. expert. (Note: Mao Guohua (毛国华) headed the MSS's Social Affairs Bureau (社会联络局 or 社会调查局), also known as the 12th bureau, and was also the secretary-general of the China International Cultural Exchange Center which allegedly was an important part of the MSS's overseas operations.)

=== Investigation ===
==== December 12, 2001 ====
The FBI obtained a warrant under the Foreign Intelligence Surveillance Act to surveil Leung as part of an investigation into her activities. They conducted a limited consensual search of Leung's residence and found an FBI telephone directory, a telephone list relating to an FBI investigation codename "Royal Tourist", a secret FBI memo concerning Chinese fugitives, and an FBI legal directory.

==== November 11, 2002 ====
The FBI conducted a covert search into Leung's luggage at Los Angeles International Airport before and after a trip she had taken to the PRC. Six photographs of FBI agents, two of whom were on active duty, were missing from her baggage upon her arrival back into the U.S.

==== December 20, 2002 ====
The FBI learned that Leung had surreptitiously copied a top-secret document that her handler Smith had checked out overnight from the FBI and transmitted the information to her MSS handler.

=== Arrest ===
Leung and Smith were arrested by the Department of Justice on the morning of April 9, 2003 at her residence in San Marino, California, and charged with "Unauthorized Copying of National Defense Information with Intent to Injure or Benefit a Foreign Nation in violation of 18 U.S.C. § 793(b)". Smith allegedly had an affair with Leung for 20 years, and allegedly brought classified materials to their trysts. Smith admitted to having a sexual relationship with Leung. Smith and Leung pleaded not guilty.

She was not charged with either treason or espionage presumably because her prosecutors did not feel they had adequate evidence to guarantee a conviction that historically had been notoriously difficult to secure. She was denied bail because she was deemed a flight risk. Leung spent three months in jail and 18 months in house arrest.

== 2004 plea agreement ==
Smith pleaded guilty to a charge of falsely concealing his alleged affair with Katrina Leung, from the FBI. He was sentenced to three months' home confinement for lying to the FBI about his affair. He also was ordered to perform 100 hours of community service. The plea allowed Smith to avoid prison time. Prosecutors also agreed to drop three other charges, including two counts of gross negligence in his handling of national security documents.

=== Case dismissed ===
On January 6, 2005, U.S. District Judge Florence Marie Cooper dismissed Leung's case on the grounds of prosecutorial misconduct. Judge Cooper found that Leung's constitutional right to a witness necessary to her defense had been violated in the language of retired Special Agent Smith's plea agreement, specifically that he "could not share further information relating to the case with Leung or her counsel".

=== Appeal and subsequent plea agreement ===
The U.S. Attorney's office appealed the case to the United States Court of Appeals for the Ninth Circuit, and entered plea negotiations with Leung concerning illegal tax returns that had been revealed as a result of this case. On December 16, 2005, Leung pleaded guilty to one count of lying to the FBI and one count of filing a false federal tax return. Leung was sentenced to the terms of her plea agreement, which stated that she must cooperate in full debriefings, three years probation, 100 hours of community service, and a US$10,000 fine.

== See also ==
- Chinese intelligence operations in the United States

== Additional sources ==
- Thomas, Randall.. Affidavit supporting an arrest warrant for Katrina Leung. (PDF)
- Indictment against Katrina Leung. Indictment against Katrina Leung for Unauthorized Copying of National Defense Information with Reason to Believe That It Will Injure the United States or Benefit a Foreign Nation. (PDF)
- Kan, Shirley A. CRS Report for Congress Congressional Research Service Report for Congress - China: Suspected Acquisition of U.S. Nuclear Weapon Secrets] (PDF)
- DOJ Review of Handling of Katrina Leung. (PDF) U.S. Department of Justice Office of the Inspector General - A Review of the FBI's Handling and Oversight of FBI asset Katrina Leung. (U) Unclassified Executive Summary
- Order Granting Defendant's motion to Dismiss (PDF)
- Kirk, Michael (Director). (2004). Frontline: From China with Love [Documentary]. Melbourne, Florida: PBS Video
