= Aquent =

Consulting firm

- Type: Private
- Industry: Professional services
- Founded: 1986
- Headquarters: Boston
- Area served: Worldwide
- Key people: John Chuang (co-founder and CEO)
- Services: Employment agencies
- Operating income: $500 million (2006)
- Number of employees: 10,000
- Website: aquent.com

Aquent is a staffing company specializing in placing temporary employees in marketing and creative industries. According to Staffing Industry Analysts, it is among the "largest marketing/creative staffing firms in the United States". Aquent also operates internationally with offices in Japan, Canada, Australia, France, UK, and the Netherlands.

== History ==
Harvard College students John Chuang, Mia Wenjen and Steve Kapner in 1986 founded a typesetting business called Laser Designs from their Harvard dorm. The business grew and they added temporary staffing related to Mac training as an offering and called it MacTemps. MacTemps grew, adding non-Mac as well as permanent placements. With MacTemps no longer reflecting the business, they changed their name to Aquent, intended to mean "not a follower" in Latin.

The company has grown substantially and entered into new business areas through acquisitions.

The company saw a drop in revenue in 2001 in the aftermath of the dot-com bubble with revenue dropping in 2001 compared to 2000. To counter the drop off in business, Aquent purchased Renaissance Worldwide Inc., an IT consultancy and staffing firm, for $106 million. Aquent at that time had been known for offering staffing of print and web designers. The deal allowed Aquent to also offer back end support staffers, which was considered by the company to complement well as a package solution. The acquisition of Renaissance also included a municipal and state government IT consulting subsidiary, which as initially planned was sold months later in 2002 to EOne Global for $45 million.

In 2003, Aquent Studios was launched as a marketing division within Aquent that provides companies with an on/off site studio, which produces creative and marketing content. Aquent Studios also operates internationally.

In 2003 the company made a hostile takeover offer for Computer Horizons Corporation, a computer network services company with a staffing business segment. Aquent through its investment banker Robert W. Baird & Co. had initially approached Computer Horizon's management on April 3, 2003 with an invitation to have dinner, which was rejected by Bill Murphy, the president and CEO of Computer Horizons. Aquent then proceeded to launch a cash tender offer on April 14, 2003 that valued Computer Horizons at $154 million. This proposal was opposed by management and in May the offer was rejected.

Aquent acquired Corporate Project Resources Inc. (CPRi), a staffing agency for marketing jobs, in 2005 for $25 million and renamed it Aquent Marketing Staffing while keeping its operations in Chicago.

In 2006, Aquent acquired Seattle-based Sakson & Taylor, a content design and development consulting and staffing firm with a significant presence at Microsoft, along with offices in several cities. The Sakson & Taylor brand (with "an Aquent company" appended) was retained for some years, but is no longer used. The former Sakson & Taylor headquarters are now Aquent's Seattle offices.

== New Divisions ==
In 2011, Aquent launched a new division, Vitamin T, which focuses on placing "digital creatives" with marketing departments and advertising agencies for contract assignments.

In 2012, Aquent launched Gymnasium offering free online courses for creative talent.

In November 2022, Aquent announced that its talent and recruiting business and its Vitamin T brand will together become Aquent Talent.

== Company Structure ==
In November 2022, Aquent announced a restructuring. The restructuring positions Aquent LLC as the parent brand of these global work solutions products:

- Aquent Talent
- Aquent Studios
- Aquent Robohead
- Aquent Scout
- Aquent Employer of Record
- Aquent Gymnasium

== Sustainability ==
Aquent announced a goal to erase its entire carbon footprint of 35 years. From 2019 to 2021 the company reported a 90% reduction of its carbon footprint.

== Diversity+ ==
Aquent launched a diversity recruiting solution for hiring managers called Diversity+. This solution provides diversity recruiting strategies to clients.

== Publications ==
Aquent releases a yearly Salary Guide for marketing, creative, and design talent. The 2023 Salary Guide revealed that despite inflation peaking at 9.1% in 2022, salaries across these positions increased by just 1.1%, and gender and ethnicity wage disparities are still prevalent.

== Recognition ==
- Aquent ranks as one of the top firms on the Best Temp Staffing Firms list and Best Professional Recruiting Firms list.
- Aquent CEO, John Chuang, named to SIA’s 2022 staffing 100 for North America.
- PRO Unlimited is a global innovator of contingent workforce management software and services. When it announced its Global Supplier Awards for Service, Aquent was singled out as the sole Platinum winner.
- Aquent received recognition for offering health insurance to part-time workers.
