= Al Young (dragster driver) =

American drag racer

Alfred John Young
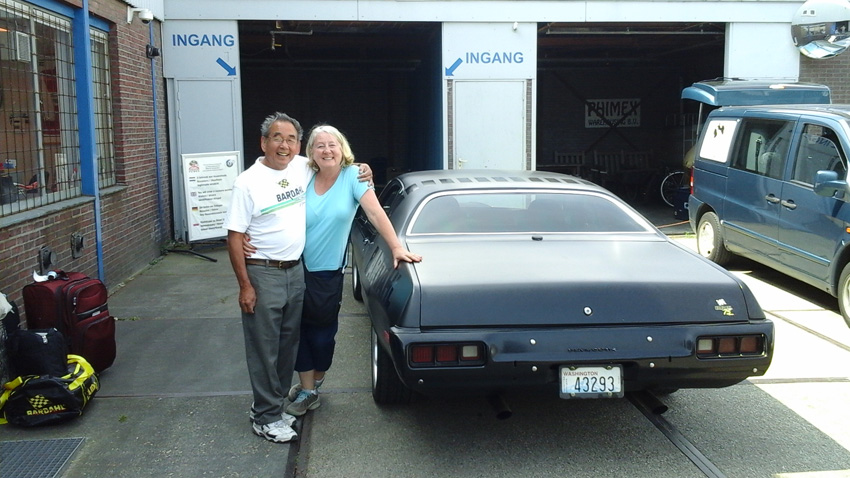
- with wife, Vicki Young, and the "Ultimate Road Trip" 1973 Plymouth Roadrunner
- Nationality: American
- Born: April 28, 1946 Whittier, California, U.S.
- Died: December 11, 2022 (aged 76) Shoreline, Washington, U.S.
- Relatives: Vicki Young (wife); Chase Young (son); Ashley Durant (daughter)

Sportsman, Pro, Super Pro, Super Street, Super Gas, Super Comp
- Years active: 1972 – 2022
- Teams: Al Young Racing, Bardahl Racing, 104 Octane Boost, Gaines Markley & Bob Gage's Custom Machine

Alfred John Young (April 28, 1946 - December 11, 2022) was a former World Champion Drag Racer and National Hot Rod Association Hall of Famer who competed in professional Bracket racing, and the heads-up categories from Super Street and Super Gas to Super Comp. He taught high school in Seattle, Washington, for 37 years, and was involved in the preparation of classic high-performance race cars. After campaigning his 1970 Dodge Challenger for over 25 years, winning the American Hot Rod Association (AHRA) World Championship and numerous other National Hot Rod Association and AHRA titles, he donated his drag racing car to the Museum of History and Industry (MOHAI) in Seattle, Washington, in 2007. During the majority of his auto racing career, he was sponsored by Ole Bardahl, founder of Bardahl Manufacturing Corporation. In 2019, he was inducted into the National Hot Rod Association, Northwest Division, Hall of Fame. He was the first Asian American World Champion race car driver.

== Biography ==
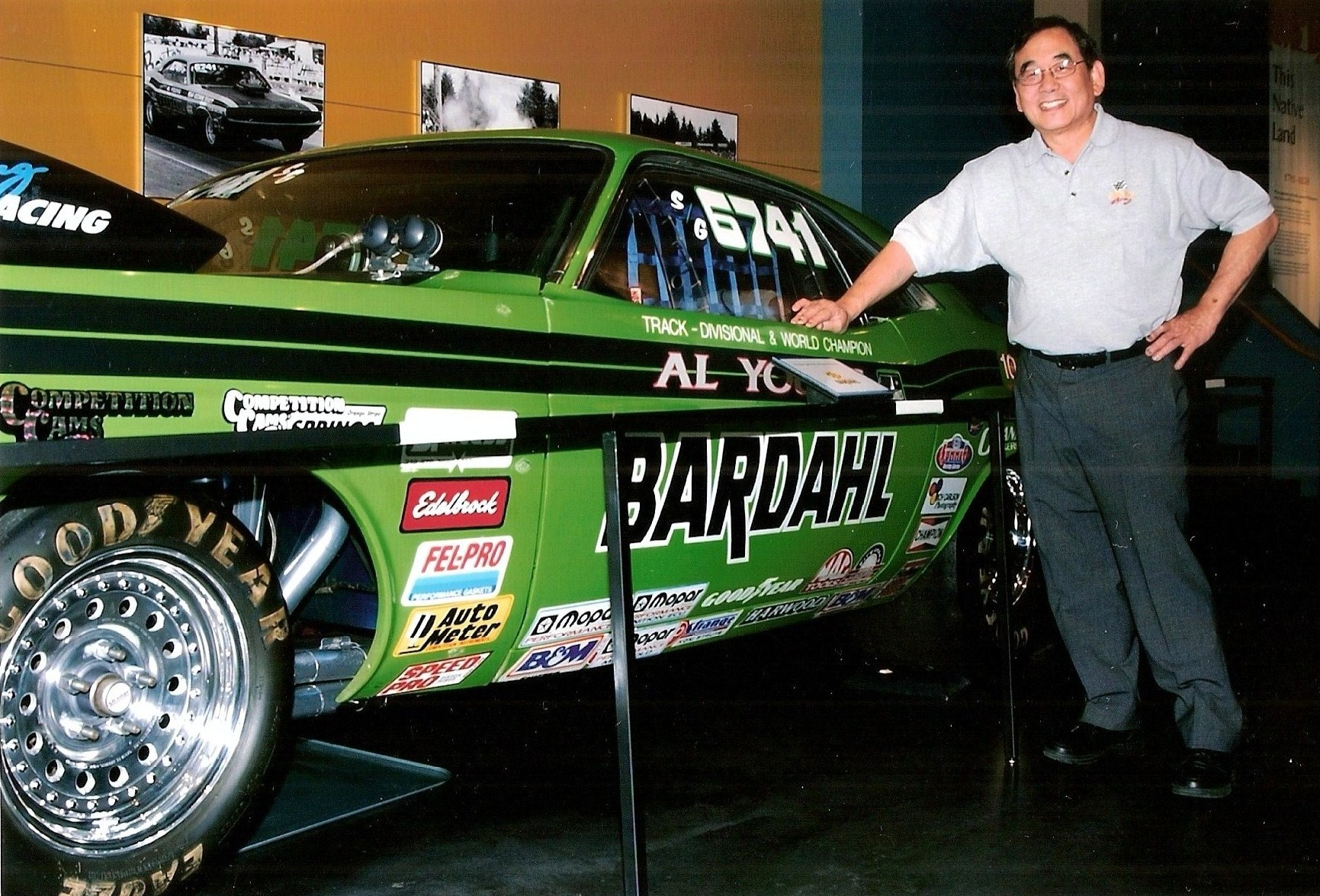
Al Young with Championship Dodge Challenger at MOHAI

Young, a Chinese American, grew up in San Francisco, California, the youngest of three children. His sisters are Janey Young Cheu, and Connie Young Yu. His father was Col. John C. Young, a Colonel in the United States Army Reserve and businessman, and mother was Mary Lee Young, an artist and art collector.

Young was married to Vicki Johnson Young, who retired from Seattle Public Schools after teaching elementary school for over 28 years. They have two children, Chase Johnson Young and Ashley Victoria Durant, and six grandchildren.

Young graduated from George Washington High School (San Francisco), studied English literature at the University of Washington, and received a BA in 1968 and MA in 1972. He was an Upward Bound tutor/counselor, teacher, and an advocate for the program since 1968.

A founder of one of Seattle's first alternative schools, the Summit K-12 School, in 1973, Young taught high school for 37 years in the Seattle Public Schools system, instructing subjects ranging from auto shop, physical education, film studies, and Chinese cooking, as well as honors courses in history, and college-level AP United States government and politics, and AP comparative government and politics.

Young was the adviser to school teams that participated in the Chrysler Trouble Shooting contests, YMCA Youth and Government mock trial competitions, and Junior State of America conventions, ad led high school groups to the South Pacific and Washington D.C. for close-up learning. During his teaching career, he also coached volleyball, softball, and basketball. The Seattle Committee for Excellence in Education named him as a nominee for their 1985 award.

Young was recognized as one of Seattle Public Schools' "Heroes in the Classroom" by Vulcan Inc., Russell Investments, and the Seattle Seahawks at Seahawks Stadium in 2004. Leaving Roosevelt High School (Seattle, Washington) in 2008, he retired from teaching.

From 2011-18, Al & Vicki drove over 60,000 miles in their classic 1973 Plymouth Roadrunner muscle car touring the U.S., Canada, and Europe. In 2014, they completed a 14-country, 45-day, 8,000-mile roadtrip around Europe in the same muscle car. On a repeat touring road trip in 2015, Vicki & Al visited 24 countries in 50 days, driving again over 8,000 miles in the Roadrunner (from Amsterdam to Greece, Istanbul, Bulgaria, and Sweden). In June/July 2016, they completed an unprecedented 3rd road trip in Europe in their Plymouth Roadrunner, driving over 7,000 miles through the United Kingdom, the Atlantic Ocean Road and National Tourist Routes of Norway, and making guest appearances at Brands Hatch and the Power Big Meet classic car events.

A member of the Seattle Kung Fu Club for over 48 years, Young practiced the traditional Chinese style of martial arts known as Hung Ga Kuen taught by Sifu John S.S. Leong. He was also active with the Chinese Historical Society of America (CHSA), narrating the documentary "Dr. Sun Yat-sen at Liberty's Door." (2011)

Young was a member of the Board of Trustees for the Museum of History and Industry (MOHAI) in Seattle, Washington from 2012 until his death.

== Racing accomplishments ==
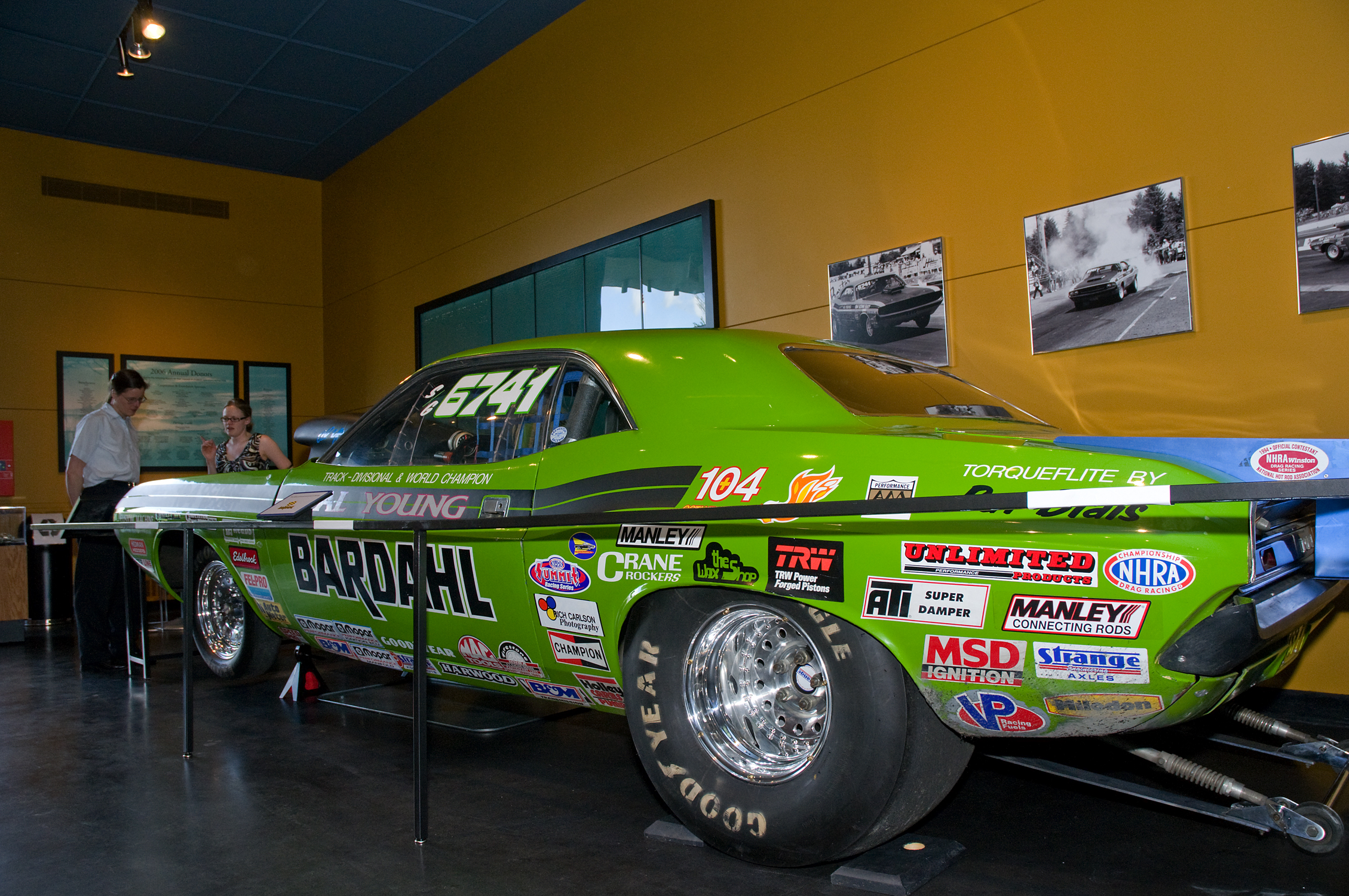
A.Young Challenger rear

American Hot Rod Association (AHRA) World Champion (1981)
National Hot Rod Association (NHRA) Division Champion (1978)
National Hot Rod Association (NHRA) Division Champion (1979)
National Hot Rod Association (NHRA) Division Champion (1983)
American Hot Rod Association (AHRA) World Finals Champion (1978)
American Hot Rod Association (AHRA) World Finals Champion (1981)
American Hot Rod Association (AHRA) World Finals Champion (1983)

Car Craft Magazine All Star Drag Team (1983)

Firebird Raceway (Boise, Idaho) Bracketeer All-Star Inductee (1988)

Twice winner of every major Championship E.T. Drag Race National event in the Pacific Northwest from 1976 to 1996.

A three-time winner of Bremerton Raceway's annual Day Fire Nationals

Donated his 1970 Dodge Challenger to the Museum of History and Industry (MOHAI) in Seattle

Winner of the "Long Distance" Award at the Power Big Meet, Vasteras, Sweden (July 2014)

Winner (repeat) of the Long Distance Award at the Power Big Meet, Vasteras, Sweden (July 2015, July 2016)

Winner NHRA Division 6 National Open, receiving The Wally at Bremerton Raceway, 2018

NHRA Hall of Fame, National Hot Rod Association, Northwest Division, 2018

== Publications ==
Hemmings Motor News (Sept 2021), article: https://www.hemmings.com/stories/2021/09/08/how-a-slice-of-detroit-muscle-opened-doors-while-traversing-the-planet

Hot Rod (magazine) (February 2018), article: "Road-Trippin' 'Round Europe" ("How to Take the Ultimate Road Trip in Europe") pp. 72–76.

Hot Rod (magazine) "Drag Racing" (May 1988), articles: "How to Win at Drag Racing" – A Champion's Guide to Winning Races – and Sponsors; and "Paying the Way (How to get a sponsor)".

Mopar Action Online: http://www.moparaction.com/2015/10/22/road_trip/

Car Craft Magazine (Dec 1981), p. 50: "The American Way:" (Photo) "Al Young 'doubled" at Spokane, clinching the Super Street event and World Championship titles the same day".

Super Stock & Drag Illustrated (Sept 1984), articles: "Kung Fu Fighter – Al Young applies his martial arts training to bracket racing".

University of Washington Alumni Association: Viewpoints Magazine: "Road Runner" pg. 2, 2008.
