= Connie Young Yu =

Chinese American writer, historian, and lecturer

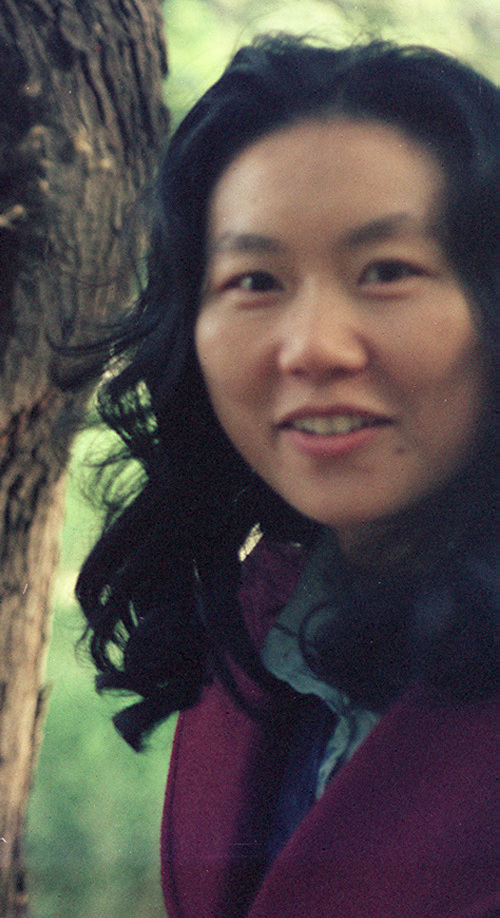
- Connie Young Yu on Angel Island, San Francisco Bay in 1975. Photo by Nancy Wong.
- Born: Connie Mary Young; June 19, 1941 (age 85); Los Angeles, California, U.S.
- Education: Mills College
- Occupations: writer, historian, lecturer
- Years active: 1969–present
- Spouse: Dr. John Kou Ping Yu

Connie Young Yu (born June 19, 1941) (Chinese: 虞容儀芳; pinyin: Yú Róng Yífāng) is a Chinese American writer, activist, historian, and lecturer.

She has written and contributed to many articles and books, notably including Profiles in Excellence: Peninsula Chinese Americans, Chinatown San Jose, U.S.A., and Voices from the Railroad: Stories by Descendants of Chinese Railroad Workers. Through her work, she uncovers forgotten or hidden facets of Chinese and Asian American history.

Yu played a central role in getting the Angel Island Immigration Station designated a National Historic Landmark, therefore preserving the detention barracks that had Chinese poems carved on the walls.

== Early life ==
Yu was born in Los Angeles, California on June 19, 1941. She spent the first six years of her life in Whittier, California.

Her father was John C. Young, a Colonel in the United States Army Reserve and a businessman. He left to fight in World War II when she was six months old, and returned when she was four. In 1947, Yu and her family moved to Chinatown in San Francisco, California where she grew up with her older sister, Janey Young Cheu, and younger brother, Alfred John Young. Her mother was Mary Lee Young, an artist and art collector, and a descendant of a Chinese railroad worker involved in the dangerous task of building the Transcontinental Railroad. Yu's grandparents lived with the family in San Francisco as well.

Growing up, Yu was surrounded by the robust Chinese American community in San Francisco and was influenced by the many generations of Chinese Americans who were family friends and would regularly visit her family and home.

Yu graduated from George Washington High School (San Francisco). She studied literature and journalism at Mills College. She graduated in 1963 with a degree in English, and she was the valedictorian of her class. While in her senior year, she wrote a final paper on the interactions between Mark Twain and the Chinese, an early example of Yu's work to seek out untold stories around the Chinese American experience.

Yu returned to the Bay Area in 1967 where she began to write articles for local Asian American publications.

== Career ==
Yu's article on Chinese railroad workers, "The Unsung Heroes of the Golden Spikes," gained her local recognition for her writing when it was published in the San Francisco Examiner on May 10, 1969.

Throughout the 1960s and 1970s, Yu was involved in many activist movements including the anti-war movement and the ethnic studies movement. She assisted in founding Asian Americans for Community Involvement (AACI) in 1973, for AACI's twentieth anniversary in 1993, she was awarded the group's Freedom Award. Her initial work with the AACI was critical to Asian American and minority representation in school textbooks.

Yu served on the Board of Trustees for Mills College from 1970 to 1972.

In 1970, after California State Park Ranger Alexander Weiss discovered Chinese poems carved on the walls of Angel Island Immigration Station, Yu worked to designate the site as a National Historic Landmark. She helped found the Angel Island Immigration Station Historical Advisory Committee in 1974. Angel Island became a National Historic Landmark in 1997. The National Historic Landmark designation prevented the Station from being demolished by the California State Parks Administration.

Yu is a member and former chairperson of the Board of Trustees of the Hakone Gardens Foundation in Saratoga, California. She is also a Trustee Emeritus Board member of the Chinese Historical Society of America.

In 2012, the Chinese Historical Society of America recognized Yu in addition to U.S. Congresswoman Judy Chu and China Daily founding member Manli Ho (daughter of Ho Feng-Shan) at their annual Voice and Vision Gala.

Yu spoke on behalf of all the descendants of Chinese Transcontinental Railroad workers at the United States Department of Labor induction of the Chinese Railroad Workers into the Labor Hall of Honor on May 9, 2014.

On April 24, 2016, she was presented the State of California's 13th Senate District "Woman of the Year" award by Senator Jerry Hill at Folger Stables Speakers Series in Woodside, California.

At the 150th anniversary of the completion of the Transcontinental Railroad on May 10, 2019, Connie Young Yu gave the opening Commencement speech at Promontory Point, Utah's "Golden Spike" Ceremony.

Most recently in 2021, she publicly co-accepted an apology to Chinese Americans by the City of San Jose, California for its violence, terrorism, and systemic racism towards Chinese in that city during the latter part of the 19th and beginning of the 20th Centuries.

In addition to her activism and writing, Yu has taught fencing for over 25 years at the Fencing Center of San Jose, California and serves on the board of directors of this non-profit club. Connie was chosen Western Region Coach of the Year, 1999, by the U.S. Fencing Coaches Association, and presented the "Award of Merit," by the USFCA in 2010.

== Personal life ==
Yu is married to Dr. John Kou Ping Yu, an oncologist, and together they have 3 children: Jennifer Yu, Jessica Yu, Marty Yu, and 3 grandchildren.

== Selected works ==
- Profiles in Excellence: Peninsula Chinese Americans (1986)
- Making Waves: An Anthology of Writings by and About Asian American Women (1989)
- Chinatown San Jose, U.S.A. (1991)
- Patchwork History the People's Bicentennial Quilt (2010)
- "Lee Wong Sang, Laying Tracks to Follow" in Voices from the Railroad: Stories by Descendants of Chinese Railroad Workers (2019)
- Hakone Estate and Gardens (2021)
