= Johnny Kan =

Chinese-American restaurateur and author

John Joseph Kan
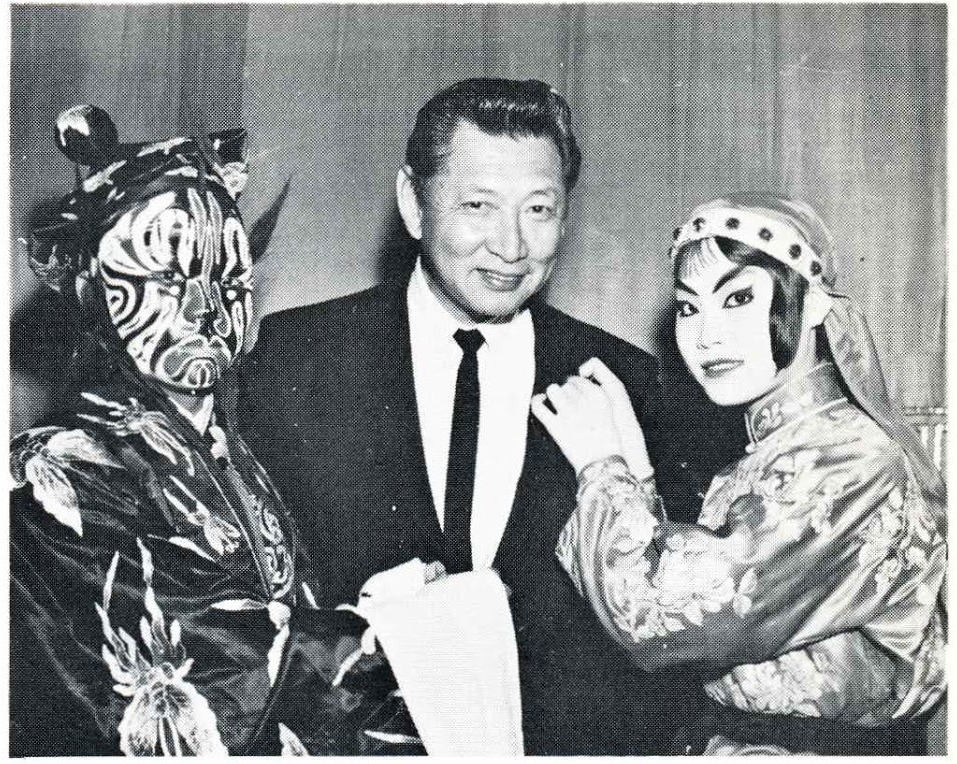
- Kan (center) c. 1963
- Born: 1905 or 1906
- Died: December 7, 1972
- Known for: Chinese restaurant (Kan's) in Chinatown, San Francisco
- Spouse: Helen

Johnny Kan (1906–1972) was a Chinese American restaurateur in Chinatown, San Francisco, ca 1950–1970. He was the owner of Johnny Kan's restaurant, which opened in 1953, and published a book on Cantonese cuisine, Eight Immortal Flavors, which was praised by Craig Claiborne and James Beard. Kan and Cecilia Chiang (proprietor of the Mandarin in Ghirardelli Square) are credited with popularizing authentic Chinese cuisine as a fine dining option, displacing the stereotypical chop suey American Chinese cuisine prevalent in the 1950s and 60s.

== Life and career ==
Kan was raised in Grass Valley, Oregon and moved to San Francisco with his family when he was nine. Because his parents could not afford the tuition, he began working at a grocery store (Sam Hing and Company, 1040 Grant) instead of attending junior high school. Sam Hing also roasted peanuts; Kan advertised in Variety at his brother's suggestion, and earned a lucrative contract with Barnum and Bailey. Kan went on to manage the Fong Fong soda fountain and bakery, introducing ice cream with traditional Chinese flavors in 1935. Fong Fong became a magnet for local Chinese-American youths, drawing weekend crowds from Berkeley and Stanford.

Kan is credited with opening the Chinese Kitchen restaurant at the corner of Mason and Pacific in 1939. It offered the first Chinese food delivery service in America; food was kept hot with the help of stainless steel hot water tanks in the back of a fleet of Chevrolet trucks.

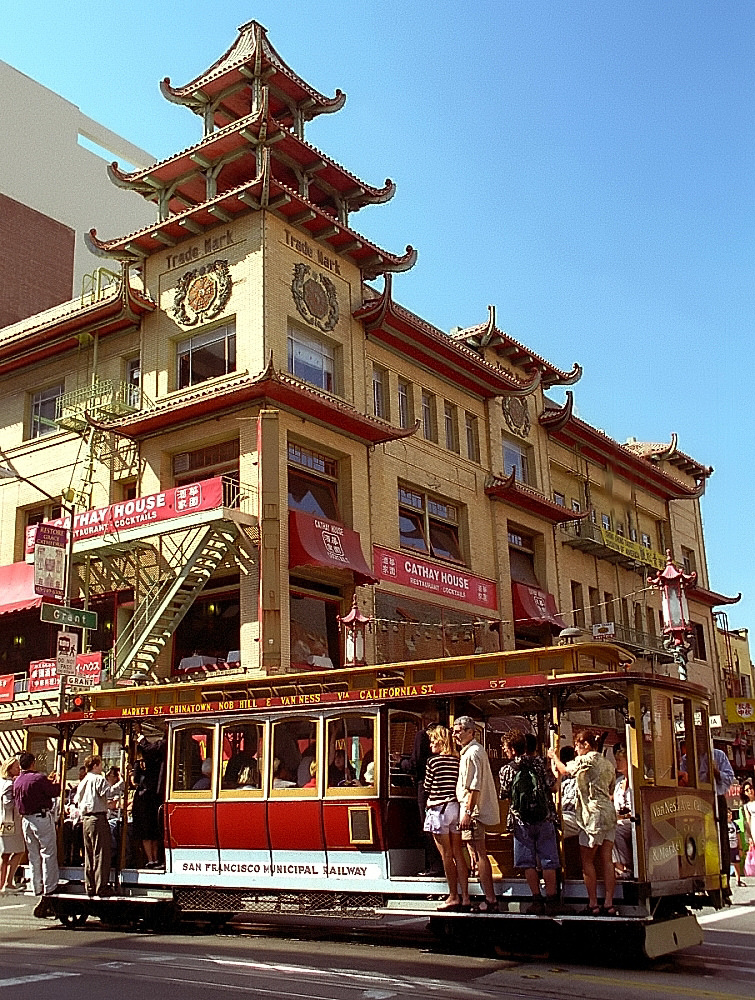
Sing Chong Building and Cathay House Restaurant at Sacramento and Grant (2008)

Kan and Dr. Theodore Lee jointly founded the Cathay House restaurant, housed in the landmark Sing Chong building at Sacramento and Grant, on September 28, 1939; the largest single investor was Ernest Tsang, who contributed US$5,500 of the US$9,700 in capital raised. Kan left the restaurant to serve in the Army during World War II, enlisting on July 23, 1943, and being honorably discharged on November 26 of the same year. After his discharge, Kan expected to be restored as co-manager of Cathay House, but Tsang refused and Kan sued him in 1944. According to Tsang's testimony, he had offered Kan the co-manager job at his previous salary of US$500/month upon Kan's return from the Army, but Kan had refused and asked for a salary equivalent to Tsang's, at US$750/month. The initial suit was not successful, and a subsequent state-level appeal was also unsuccessful, but the verdict was later overturned in federal court.

=== Kan's ===
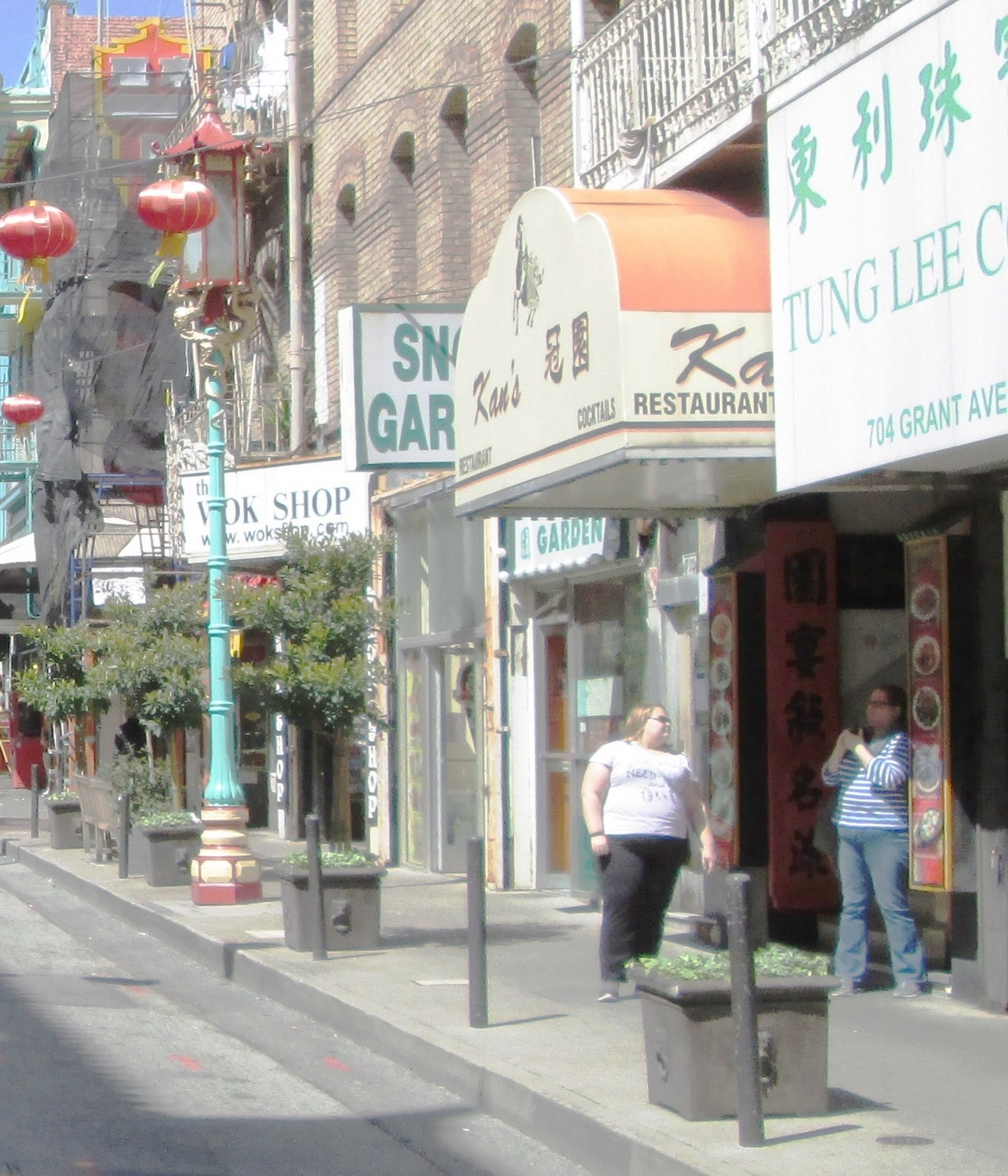
Kan's at 708 Grant (2017)

The eponymous restaurant "Kan's" operated at 708 Grant Avenue. In Kan's words, he wanted to "launch the first efficiently operated and most elaborate Chinese restaurant [in Chinatown] since the collapse of the old Mandarin [Restaurant on Bush]." According to the Chinese Historical Society of America, "Kan's was the first restaurant in Chinatown to win the Holiday (magazine) Award for fine dining; that award was given to Kan's for 14 consecutive years. Its name was frequently on top ten lists of San Francisco restaurants. World-famous celebrities, movie stars, the rich and the powerful came to Kan's, and their appearances were written up by San Francisco columnist Herb Caen." Don Clever was credited with designing the interior at Kan's.

To tourists (and natives) who would innocently order chop suey, Johnny would purr, 'I'm sorry, we serve only Chinese food here.'

— Herb Caen, Eulogy for Johnny Kan

The introduction of an innovative version of the Lazy Susan to Chinese restaurants has been attributed to Kan's: "The trail of the Chinese Lazy Susan finally picks up in the 1950s, which is when Chinese food got its makeover. The hub of Chinese American cuisine was San Francisco's Chinatown, where a new generation of entrepreneurial restaurant owners was trying to better adapt Chinese cooking to American tastes. One of them was Johnny Kan, who opened a Cantonese-style restaurant in 1953. He worked with three Chinese-American friends (George Hall, John C. Young (brothers-in-law who started Wing Nien Foods, a soy sauce company) and George Chow who had helped acquire the very important liquor license - to try to make his restaurant both respectable and modern...In the mid-1950s, Hall...put together a revolving tabletop that became the pivotal element of Kan's new banquet room."

... in a party of six or eight persons, there would always be one who disliked Chinese food. No matter what the captain or waiters may say to him, his answer is, 'I hate Chinese food, bring me a steak!' Then what?
Well, with our glass-enclosed kitchen, we could say to the difficult guest, 'Will you please do us a favor? Come and watch us prepare fresh food and see our woks.' It usually took me about fifteen minutes to educate a disliker when I could have him smell the aroma of fresh, barbecued pork coming out of the oven, or sizzling filet of chicken breasts in a wok with beautiful, fresh vegetables around, snow peas or chard toss-cooked for just a few seconds. Usually a man like this will end up being a real enthusiast. Why? Because he never knew how real Chinese food was prepared. Now he was no longer a chop suey believer. And of course, in the years since that initial education period, we've introduced our friends to Peking Duck and many other complex dishes enjoyed by Cantonese people on the mainland, in Hong Kong, and here in San Francisco.

— Johnny Kan, interviewed c.1963 for Longtime Californ' (1972)

Celebrities who dined at Kan's regularly included Frank Sinatra, Dean Martin, Sammy Davis Jr., Marilyn Monroe, and Herb Caen, who helped to publicize the restaurant in his column. Jeanne Phillips, best known for helping her mother with and then taking over the advice column Dear Abby, confesses she "had a huge crush on the maitre d', and the food was good, too." While covering the 1964 Republican National Convention, Walter Cronkite dined at Kan's; after Kan asked if he would like to meet the chef, Cronkite was ushered into the kitchen and introduced to Danny Kaye, who had been studying at Chinese cooking at Kan's for years.

Following the immediate success of Kan's Restaurant, the four partners recruited a fifth partner, Dan Lee, and opened another premium Chinese restaurant in 1956 named Ming's, located on El Camino Real near Stanford University in Palo Alto, on the San Francisco Peninsula. Ming's moved to 1700 Embarcadero Road in 1968, and was subsequently sold in 1991 to Vicky Ching. That restaurant closed at the end of 2014, and the land was intended to be redeveloped as an extended-stay hotel which would host a smaller Ming's in the lobby by 2016. However, those plans fell through. The City of Palo Alto adopted a mitigated negative declaration for plans to redevelop the site as an auto dealership in 2016.

=== Gum Shan paintings by Jake Lee ===
Kan commissioned twelve paintings from Jake Lee in 1959, and hung them in the Gum Shan (金山) private dining room at Kan's. After Kan died in 1972, the paintings were thought to be lost; the succeeding owner, Guy Wong, had kept the paintings up until he closed the restaurant in the early 1990s, after which he stored them in the garage of one of his busboys, Bloor Chau. Chau later ran out of space and threw them away in 2008. Eleven of the twelve later surfaced at an auction in Pasadena in 2010. The Chinese Historical Society of America acquired seven of the eleven that were on auction after hurriedly raising $60,000 from donors. After CHSA tracked down Guy Wong and Bloor Chau, they found the twelfth painting, depicting the champion Chinese fire-hose team of Deadwood, South Dakota in 1888, hanging in Chau's business, an automotive repair shop in the Bayview district of San Francisco. The remaining four paintings were acquired by a private collector in Kern County.

== Death and legacy ==
Kan died on December 7, 1972, aged 66, from cancer, at Saint Francis Memorial Hospital. Funeral services were held in Oakland on December 11.

Kan and his wife Helen were one of six couples who purchased the neglected Hakone Gardens in 1961 and restored the site before selling it to the city of Saratoga in 1966.
