= John C. Young =

Chinese American community leader (1912–1987)

- Col. John C. Young and Mary Lee Young
- Born: June 16, 1912; San Jose, California, U.S.
- Died: October 27, 1987 (aged 75)
- Occupation: Businessman
- Known for: Chinese American community leader, businessman, and military service
- Title: Colonel, U.S. Army Reserve

John Chew Young (Chinese: 容兆珍; pinyin: Róng Zhàozhēn; June 16, 1912 – October 27, 1987), a Chinese American businessman and community leader, was born in San Jose, California. A key figure in the development of Chinatown, San Francisco, he was one of the original board members of the Chinese Historical Society of America, and a decorated American World War II army veteran of the China Burma India Theater.

He was celebrated as one of the 20 individuals from San Francisco history "who was heroic in stature and who contributed significantly to the building of the San Francisco we know today" as part of the Called to Rise monument by Thomas Marsh in the Financial District. The monument's inscription describes Young as "an Engineer from Stanford University [who] devoted himself to the improvement of San Francisco's Chinatown and helped found the annual Chinese New Years Parade."

== Early and personal life ==
John C. Young was the second son of Mr. and Mrs. Young Soong Quong. John's father came to California as a farm laborer in 1881, at the age of 11. John was born in 1912 and grew up in San Jose Chinatown; he attended public schools in San Jose. After graduating with a degree in petroleum engineering from Stanford University in 1937, he married Mary Lee Young (Chinese: 李心如 Pinyin: Li Ruxin. December 1, 1908 – January 14, 2002), a San Francisco born Chinese American, and they had three children: Janey Young Cheu, Connie Young Yu, and Alfred John Young.

== Military career ==
Commissioned in the United States Army at the outbreak of World War II, Young served in the China Burma India Theater—initially to organize the airdrop of supplies to troops and to Dr. Gordon Seagrave, "the Burma Surgeon"; and then as a member of the liaison group under General Joseph Stilwell. Young spent more than two years along the Burma Road, training and advising Chinese troops in ordnance activities and participated in the Salween campaign. At the Battle of Mount Song (Songshan Mountain), he and other U.S. Army engineers (Peter S. Hopkins and Carlos Spaht), helped design and implement the strategy of tunneling and placing TNT charges that destroyed the core of that Japanese stronghold. After the road was opened, he helped equip the Chinese armies with new American weapons. "John Young was awarded one of China's highest decorations, the Grand Order of the Cloud and Banner, for his aid in opening the man-made, 1,000-mile lifeline. For his service as a U.S. Army Combat Liaison Officer in World War II, he was awarded the Asiatic-Pacific Campaign Medal. (Military Record and Report of Separation, Certificate of Service, National Personnel Records Center, 29 Dec 45.)

"After graduating in engineering from Stanford University in 1937, John Young became active as a businessman and consultant in San Francisco. Commissioned in the United States Army at the outbreak of World War II, Young served in the China Burma India Theater as a liaison officer between Chinese and American Troops. Leaving the service with the rank of a major, Young returned to San Francisco to run his own manufacturing business and to serve on the Chinese Chamber of Commerce. For more than thirty years, Young devoted himself to the improvement of San Francisco's Chinatown. Among other things, he helped found the annual Chinese New Year's Parade (and the Miss Chinatown USA Pageant), worked for low-cost federal housing in Chinatown, and worked with the city government to upgrade the Chinatown infrastructure. Rising to the rank of colonel in the United States Army Reserve, Young played an important role in the Chinese-American Veterans' affairs, including the establishment of a memorial to Chinese veterans of World War II placed in St. Mary's Square."

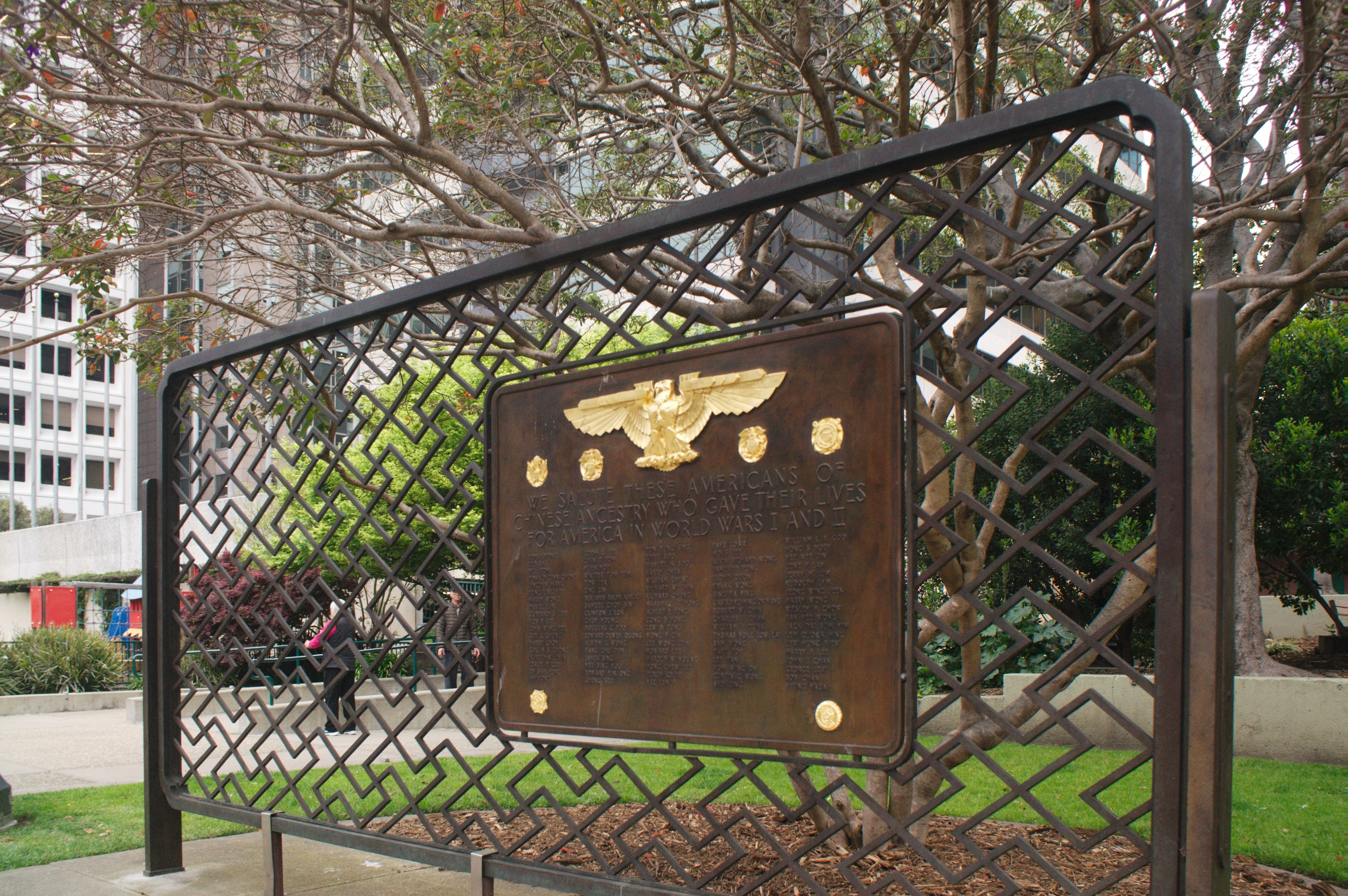
Memorial for fallen Chinese American Veterans of World Wars I and II, St. Mary's Square, Chinatown, San Francisco

As a commander of the American Legion Post No. 384 (Cathay Post), Young helped to establish the San Francisco memorial to the fallen Chinese American Veterans of World War I and World War II, and along with his former commanding officer, General Albert Wedemeyer, helped to preside over its dedication.

During the Korean War, Young was recalled to active duty and served as the chief of the Inspection Division of the San Francisco Ordnance District from 1951 to 1953. He retired as a reserve officer in June 1972 with the rank of full colonel.

== Wing Nien ==
John C. Young and his brother-in-law, George Hall "....set up the first factory in the United States that manufactured soy sauce (Wing Nien Brand) using the old Chinese fermentation process." They organized the U.S. Enterprise Corporation which handled property development, import, and exporting. Young and Hall also were part owners with Johnny Kan in Kan's Restaurant, as well as Hakone Gardens, Saratoga, California. After George Hall's death in 1966, John C. Young became president of the U.S. Enterprise Corporation and headed Wing Nien Soy Sauce Co. until his retirement in 1977.

== Legacy ==
Col. Young and his wife Mary donated their extensive collection of Chinese Imperial Robes and Chinese jade to the Stanford University Cantor Center for Visual Arts and to the Tacoma Art Museum.

Shortly after Young's death, Mary funded the building of a museum in China near Young's father's ancestral village in Doumen District, Zhuhai, Guangdong, China. The museum bears Young's Chinese name: The Zhaozhen Museum.

== See also ==
- Al Young (dragster driver)
- Carlos Spaht
- Connie Young Yu
