= Power Big Meet =

Car meet-up in Lidköping, Sweden

Power Big Meet (sometimes shortened "Power Meet") is a classic car show held in Lidköping, Sweden, for American cars (especially those from the 1950s and 1960s). It is held each summer during the first weekend of July and is a major event for people who hold an interest for old American cars from all over the world. While initially held Friday to Sunday, it has been changed to Thursday to Saturday.

Power Big Meet is one of the biggest car events in the world. Every year between 55 and 75 thousand people visit Power Big Meet to look at other and show their own cars at Hovby airfield in Lidköping.

The Power Big Meet began in 1978, and celebrated its largest crowd on record ever in 2007 during its 30th gathering.

During the Power Big Meet 2004 the police reported that an estimated 12,000 cars had participated in the festivities, breaking all previous records. During 2014 17,000 cars participated and 200,000 visitors showed up.

The 2017 Power Big Meet in Lidköping drew approximately 22,000 automobiles. Despite this, the newly instated Västerås Summer Meet only saw a minor decrease of cars and visitors compared to the previous year.

== Move to Lidköping and Västerås Summer Meet ==
The night of 8 July 2016, during Power Big Meet, Kjell "Kjelle Power" Gustafsson was robbed while carrying over 1 million SEK in cash that were supposed to be deposited at a nearby bank, something he had done the previous 30 years. According to Gustafsson, who owns the Power Big Meet trademark, there would be no more Power Big Meet, and the only ones who would be able to arrange it, besides himself, would be "Jesus and his buddies". A few days later Klas "Brinken" Brink, a local entrepreneur who had been a part of the Power Big Meet team for 15 years, hoping that Gustafsson would have a change of heart, booked the airfield for a 2017 car meet. After a week of silence from Gustafsson about Power Big Meet, Brink stated in the press that he was prepared to save PBM and hoped that Gustafsson would join him and make the 40th Power Big Meet something special. Gustafsson stated that the booking of the airfield was an act of treason, and that Brink would be unable to organize anything as big as Power Big Meet. He also claimed that Brink had used the Power Big Meet brand without permission, threatening him with a lawsuit. As of July 2017, no suit has been filed.

On 19 July Gustafsson apparently changed his mind, stating there would indeed be a Power Big Meet in Västerås 2017, on the condition that Brink, one of the contacts between PBM, its sponsors and the city of Västerås, would not be allowed to get involved in any way whatsoever.

On 30 October, Gustafsson confirmed a recent rumor that Power Big Meet would move to Lidköping, stating that the event had outgrown the Johannisberg airfield. Brink then started working on bringing a car meet to Västerås, and following a public poll the name of this meet was decided 2 November: Västerås Summer Meet.

== Gallery ==
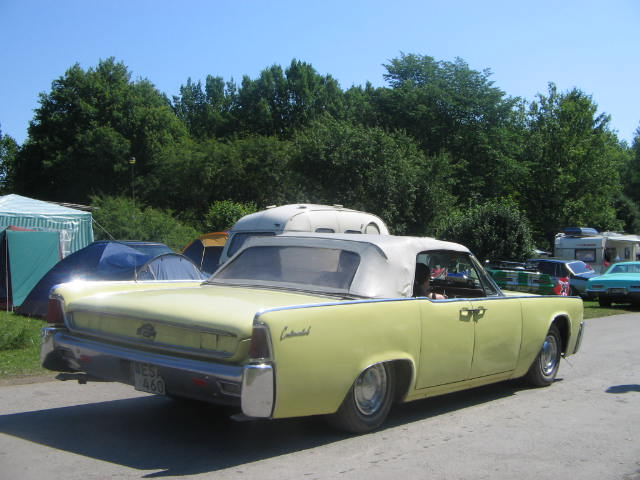
A 1961 Lincoln Continental.

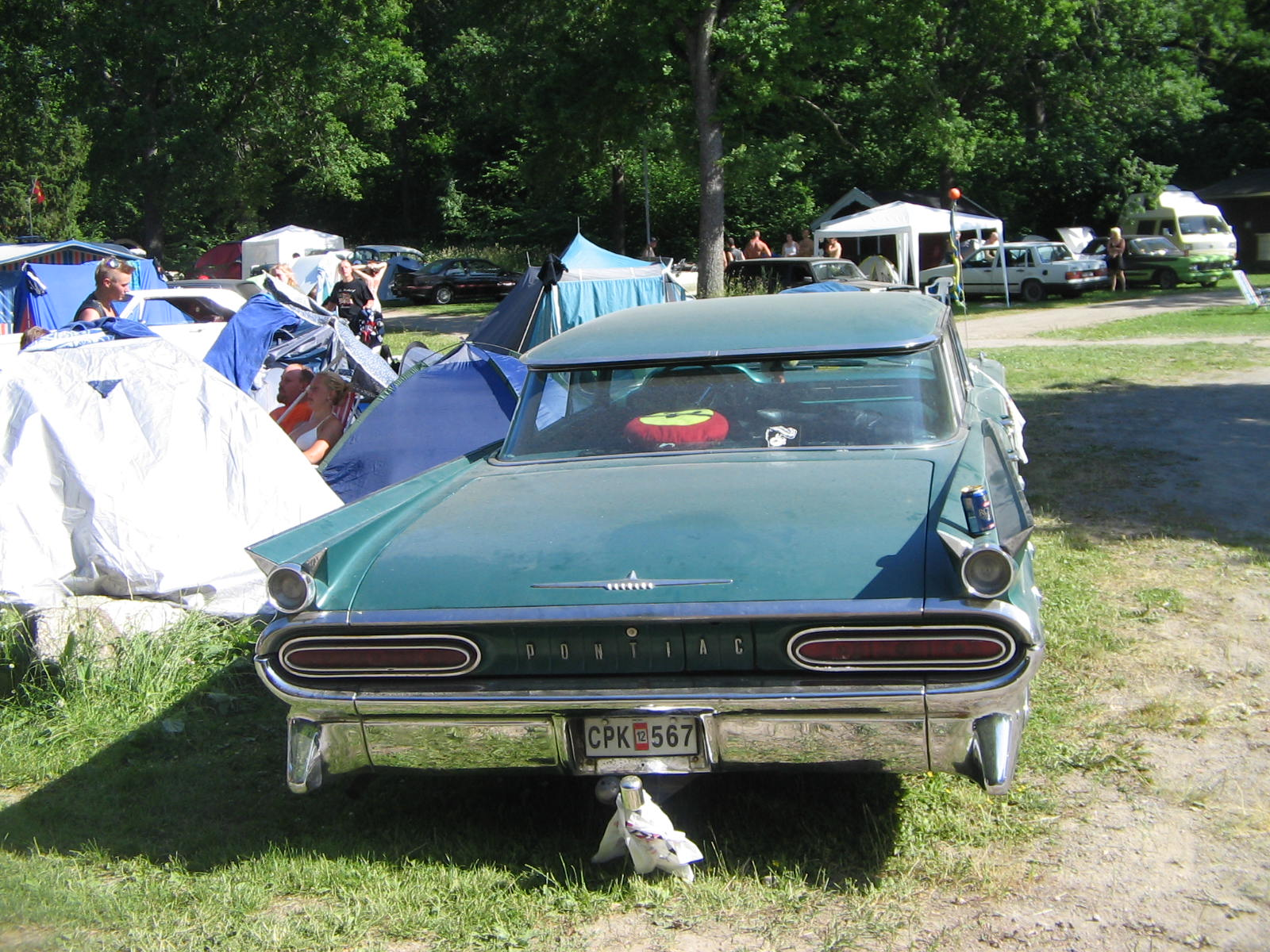
A 1959 Pontiac Starchief 4DHT.

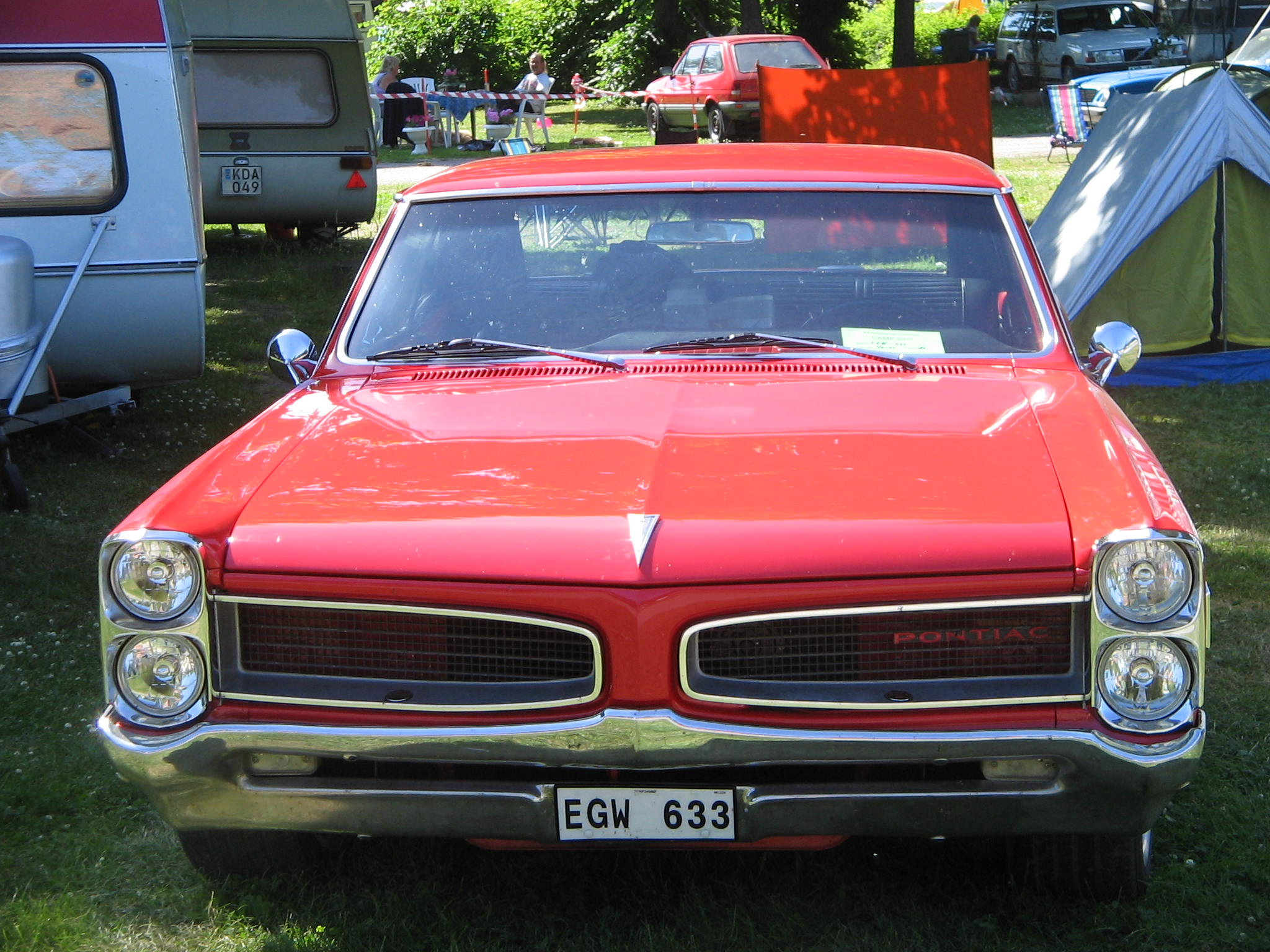
1966 Pontiac Tempest 23717.

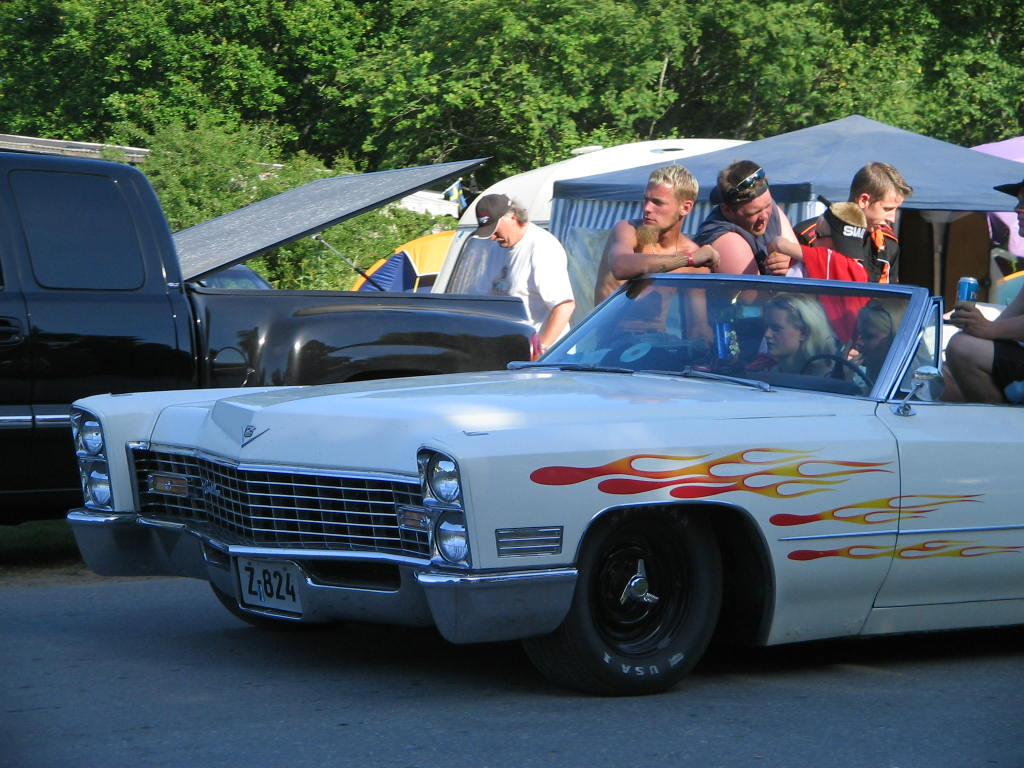
White Cadillac with flames

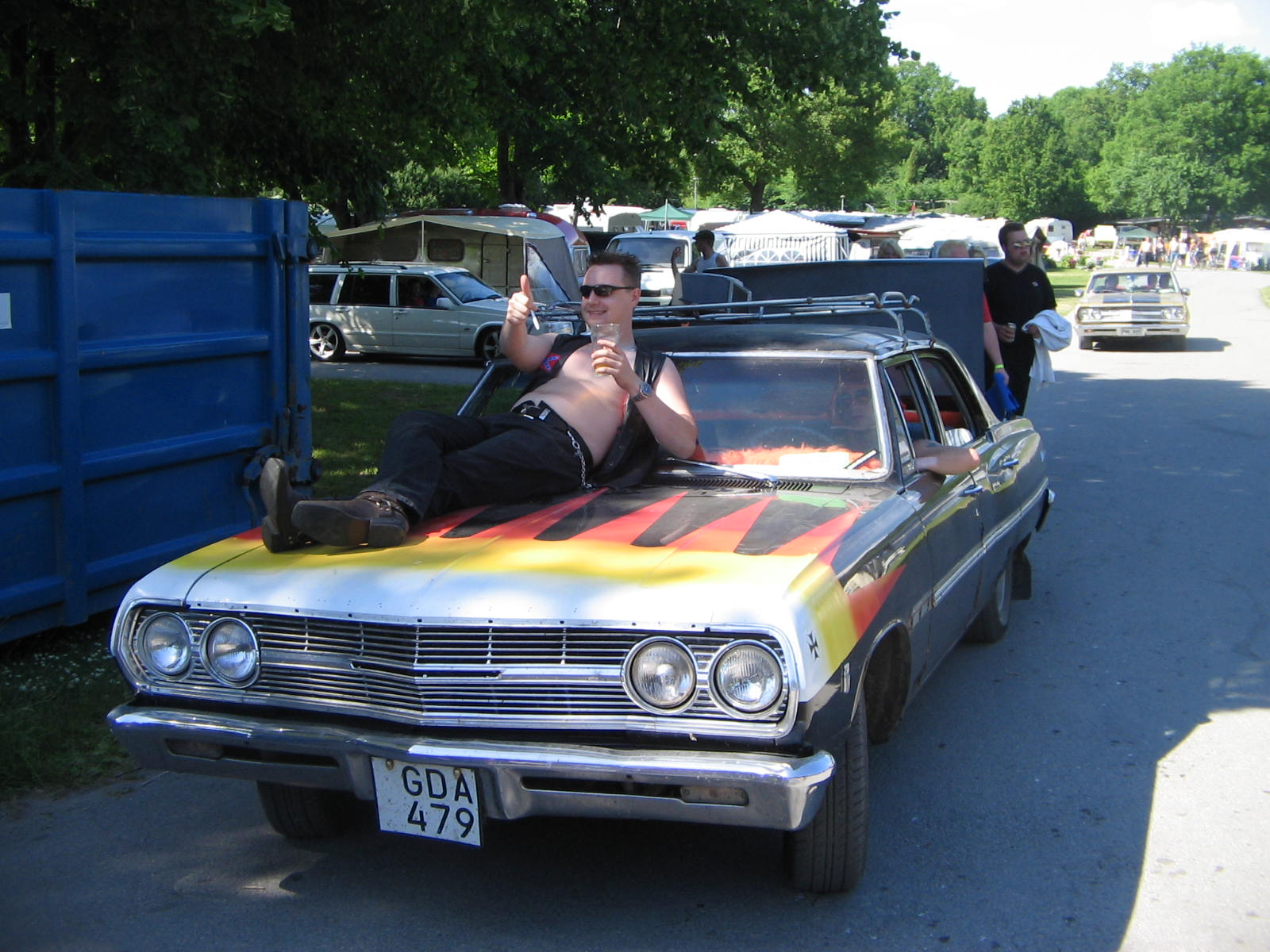
A 1965 Chevrolet Chevelle 13569.
