= Super Comp =

Class of car racing

Super Comp (or Quick Rod) is the fastest of the heads-up Super classes (8.90 index). Super Comp is composed primarily of dragsters. Engine, chassis and body modifications are virtually unlimited, though all entries must adhere to NHRA or IHRA safety standards. Four and six-cylinder-powered entries may have a minimum weight of 1,000 pounds; all others cannot weigh less than 1,350 pounds.

Most Super Comp or Quick Rod cars are capable of running well under the 8.90 index, but they use a number of electronic aids, including a timer and an adjustable throttle (also known as a throttle stop), to run as close to the index as possible without breaking out. In the IHRA, the class is called Quick Rod. It is the fastest of the three Rod Classes. Besides dragsters, there are also doorslammers, altereds and roadsters.

At race tracks where the altitude is above 1,500 feet above sea level (mostly in Divisions 5, 6, and 7 in the NHRA), tracks will have an Altitude Correction Factor multiplied into the index time. The index time will be multiplied by the Altitude Correction Factor to obtain the official time used by the NHRA. At The Strip at Las Vegas Motor Speedway, the index is 9.05 seconds.
