= Hakone Gardens =

Traditional Japanese garden in Saratoga, California

Coordinates: 37.252384°N 122.04095°W

- Hakone Historic District
- U.S. National Register of Historic Places
- U.S. Historic district
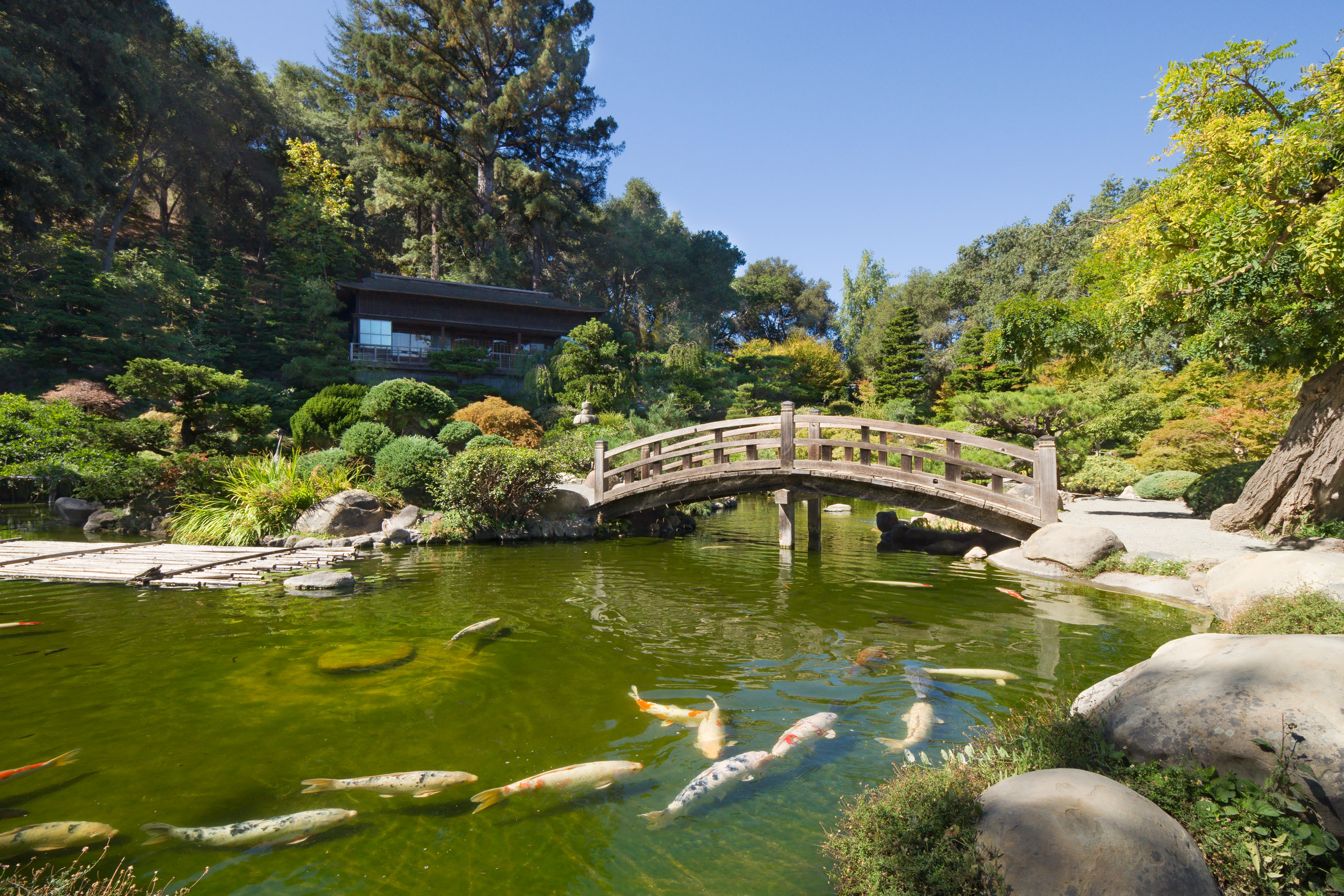
- Hakone Gardens
- Location: 21000 Big Basin Way, Saratoga, California
- Area: 18 acres (7.3 ha)
- Built: 1917-1991
- Website: www.hakone.com
- NRHP reference No.: 13000181
- Added to NRHP: April 23, 2013

Hakone Gardens is an 18-acre (7.3 ha) traditional Japanese garden in Saratoga, California, United States. A recipient of the Save America's Treasures Award by the National Trust for Historic Preservation, it is recognized as one of the oldest Japanese-style residential gardens in the Western Hemisphere. Notable features include a bamboo garden, a Zen garden, a strolling garden (the Hill and Pond Garden), tea houses, and the Cultural Exchange Center, which is an authentic reproduction of a 19th-century Kyoto tea merchant's house and shop.

== History ==
In 1915, two San Francisco arts patrons, Oliver and Isabel Stine, intending to build a summer retreat, purchased the 18-acre (7.3 ha) site on which Hakone now stands. Inspired by the Panama–Pacific International Exposition and her subsequent 1916 trip to Japan, Isabel Stine modeled the gardens upon (and named them after) Fuji-Hakone-Izu National Park. She hired Japanese landscape artists and architects to design the gardens (credited to Naoharu Aihara) and the Upper "Moon Viewing" House (credited to Tsunematsu Shintani). Construction proceeded between 1917 and 1929. In 1923, the west coast premiere of Puccini's Madama Butterfly was held in the gardens; Isabel Stine was a co-founder and patron of the producing company, the San Francisco Opera.

In 1932, ownership passed to financier Major Charles Lee Tilden who hired landscape gardener James Sasaki and added the main gate to the gardens. When he died, Hakone was inherited by his sister, Mrs. Walter Gregory. After her death in 1959, Hakone was left untended, and the property was put up for sale by her son.

In 1961, Joseph and Clara Gresham, their son Eldon and his wife Deon, and four Chinese American couples (George and Marie Hall, Johnny Kan and Helen Kan, Dan and June Lee, Col. John C. Young and Mary Lee Young) purchased the estate. This partnership restored Hakone, keeping its traditional Japanese authenticity while using it as a private retreat. In 1966 the partners offered Hakone for sale to the City of Saratoga. By purchasing the property, Saratoga saved it from potential redevelopment.

The City of Saratoga hired landscape gardener Tanso Ishihara, who cooperated with architect Kiyoshi Yasui to develop a master plan to expand the gardens over the full property. The original main gardens, ponds, waterfalls, and walkways were restored, and a new series of trails on the southwest hillside were constructed. A new garden (the Bamboo Garden) was added in 1987 to commemorate the sister city relationship between Saratoga and Mukō in Kyoto Prefecture.

Today Hakone is administered by The Hakone Foundation, a non-profit organization, which was established in 2000 to restore and enhance the gardens independently of public funding. The gardens are open to the public and the various community facilities are often used for cultural events.

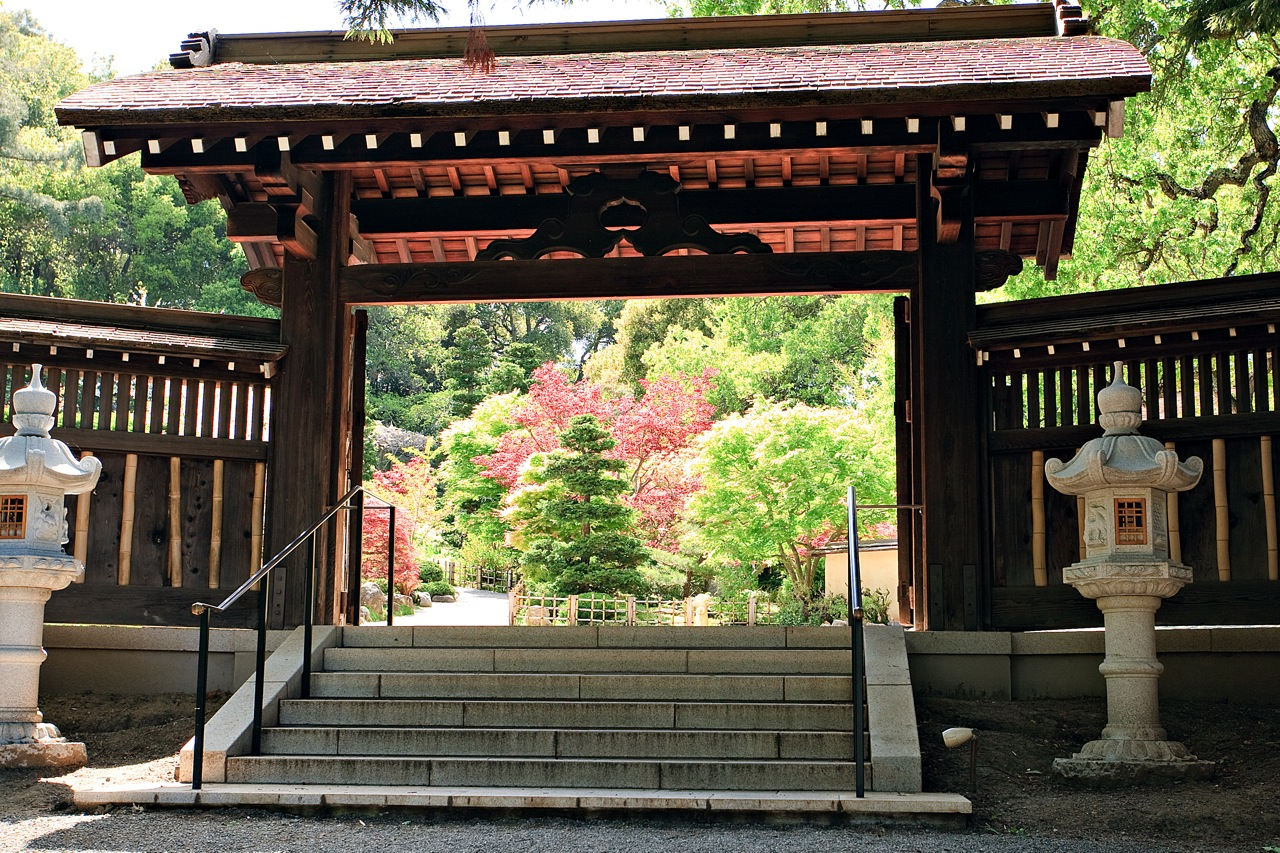
1941 Main Gate (Mon)

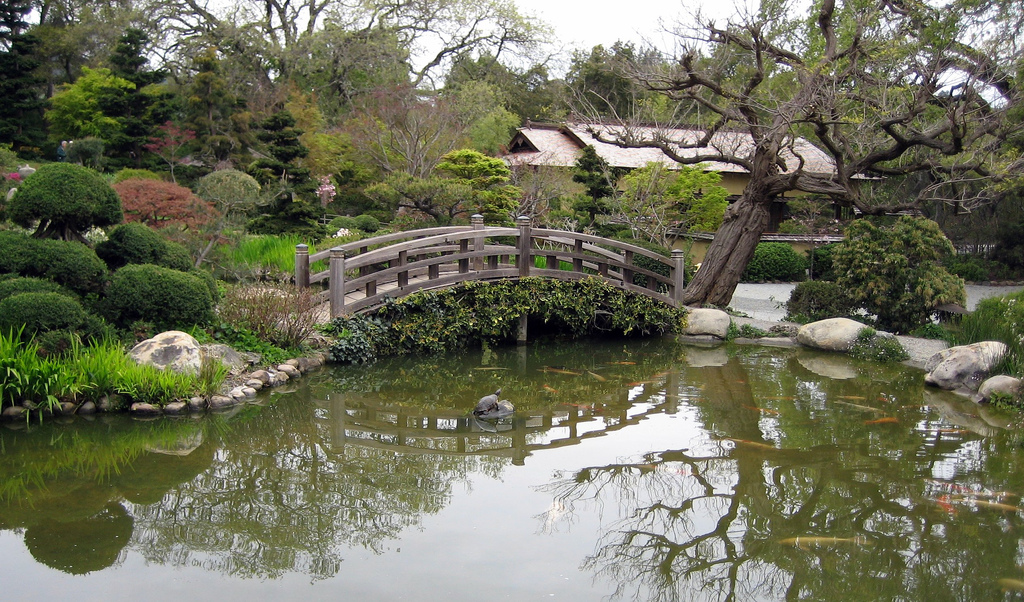
The Moon Bridge over the koi pond in the Hill and Pond Garden

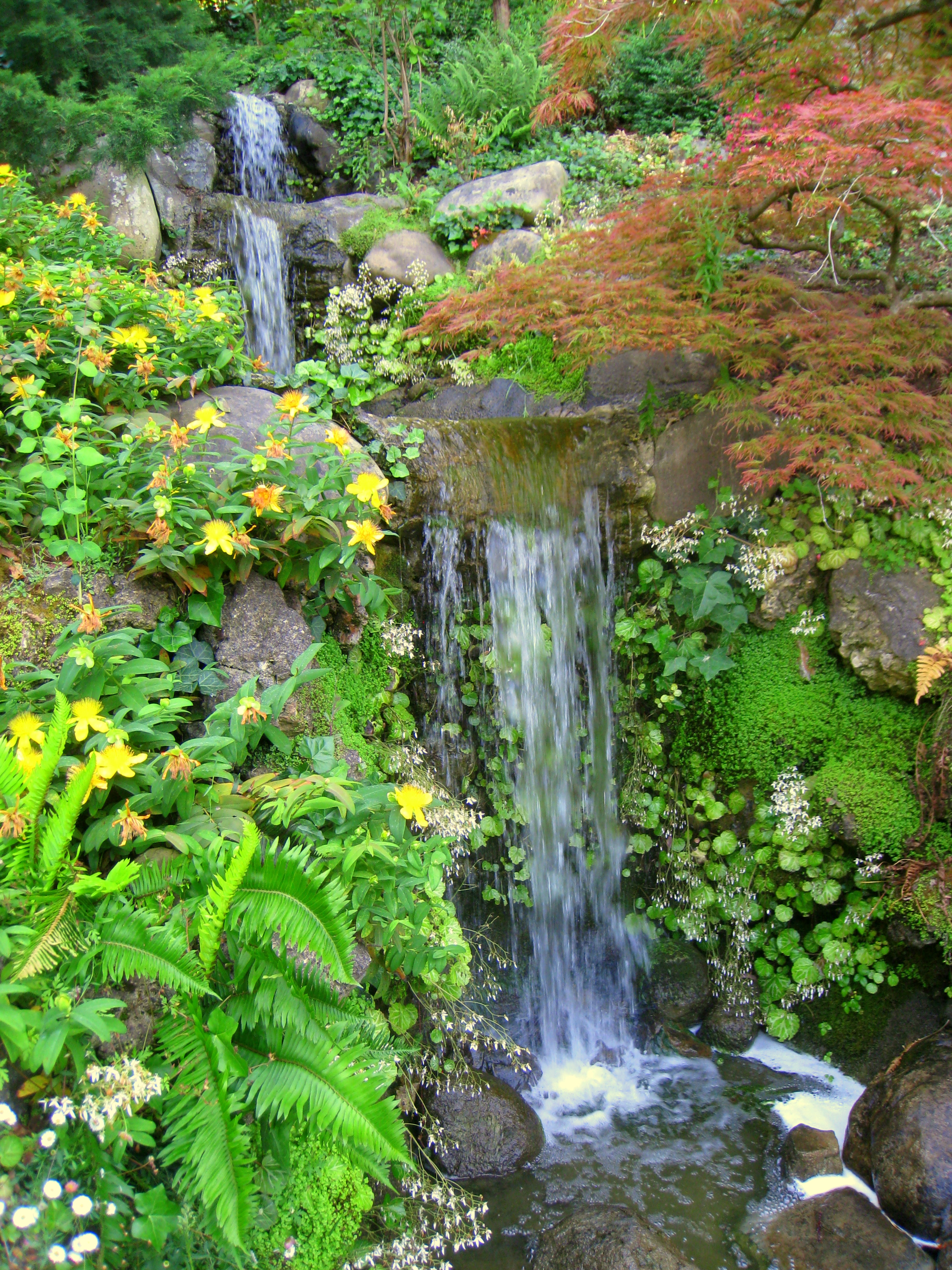
Hillside waterfall in the Hill and Pond Garden (2010)

Red-eared slider turtle and Koi at Hakone

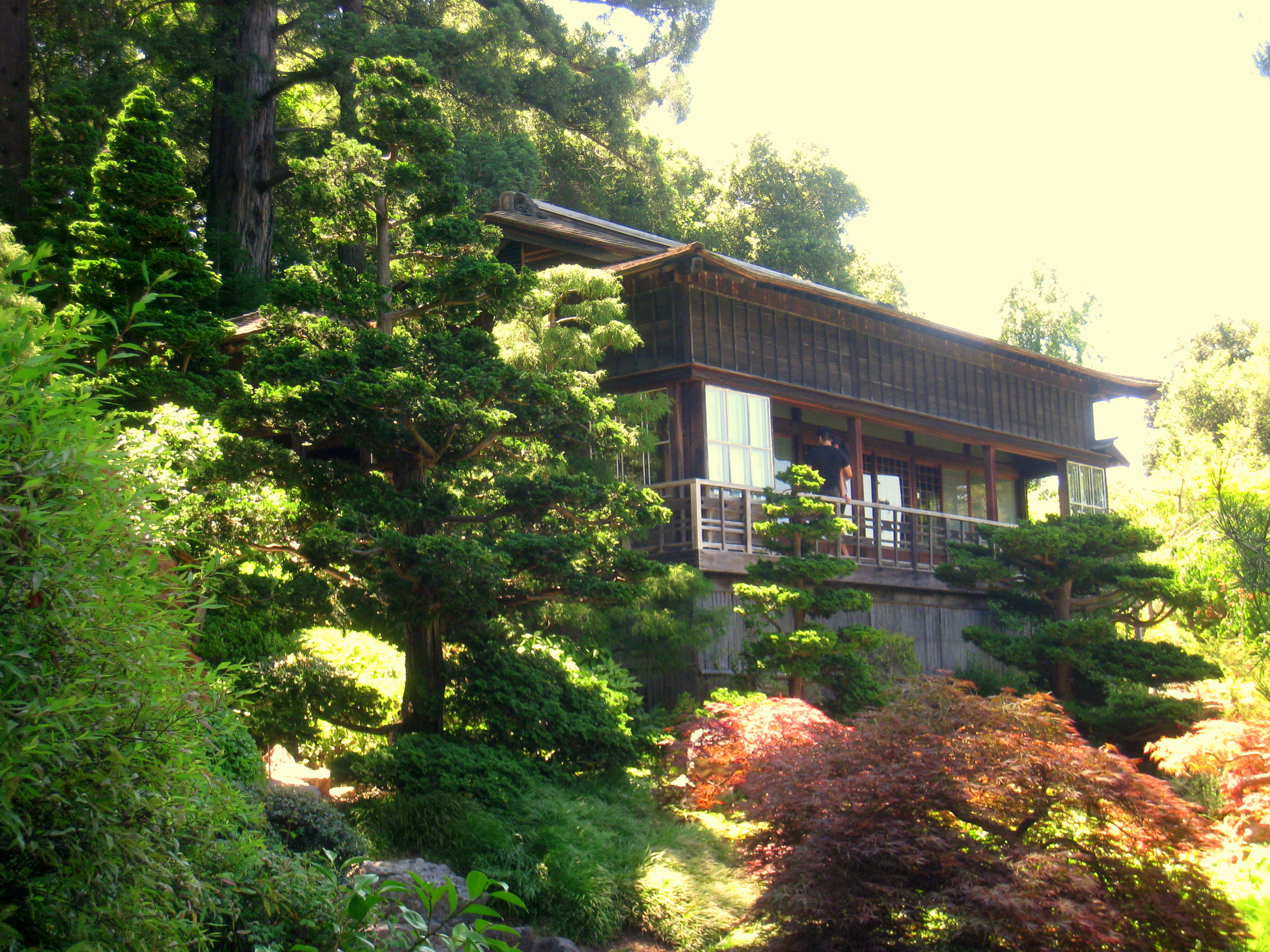
Moon Viewing (Upper) House (2010)

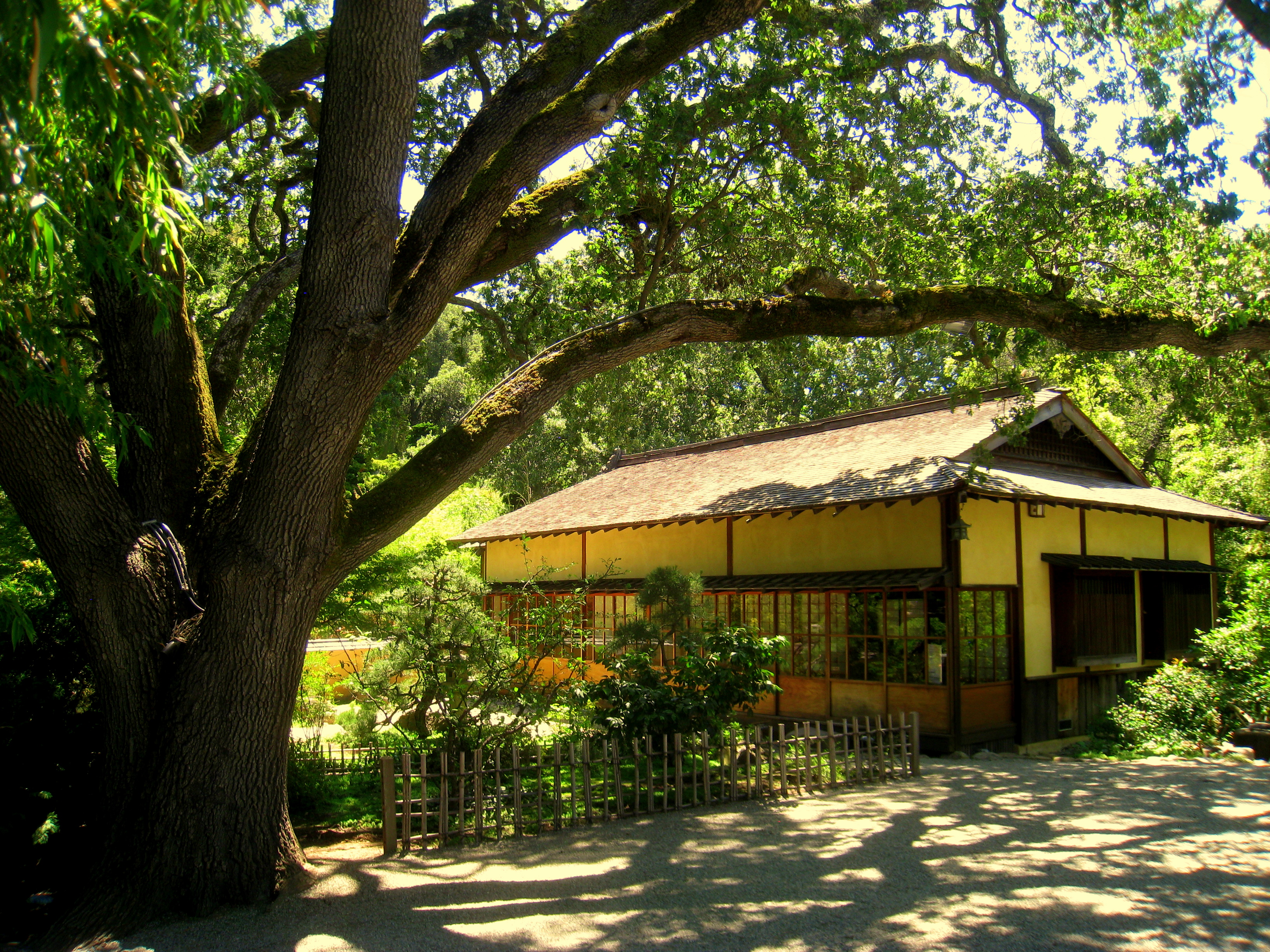
Lower House (2010)

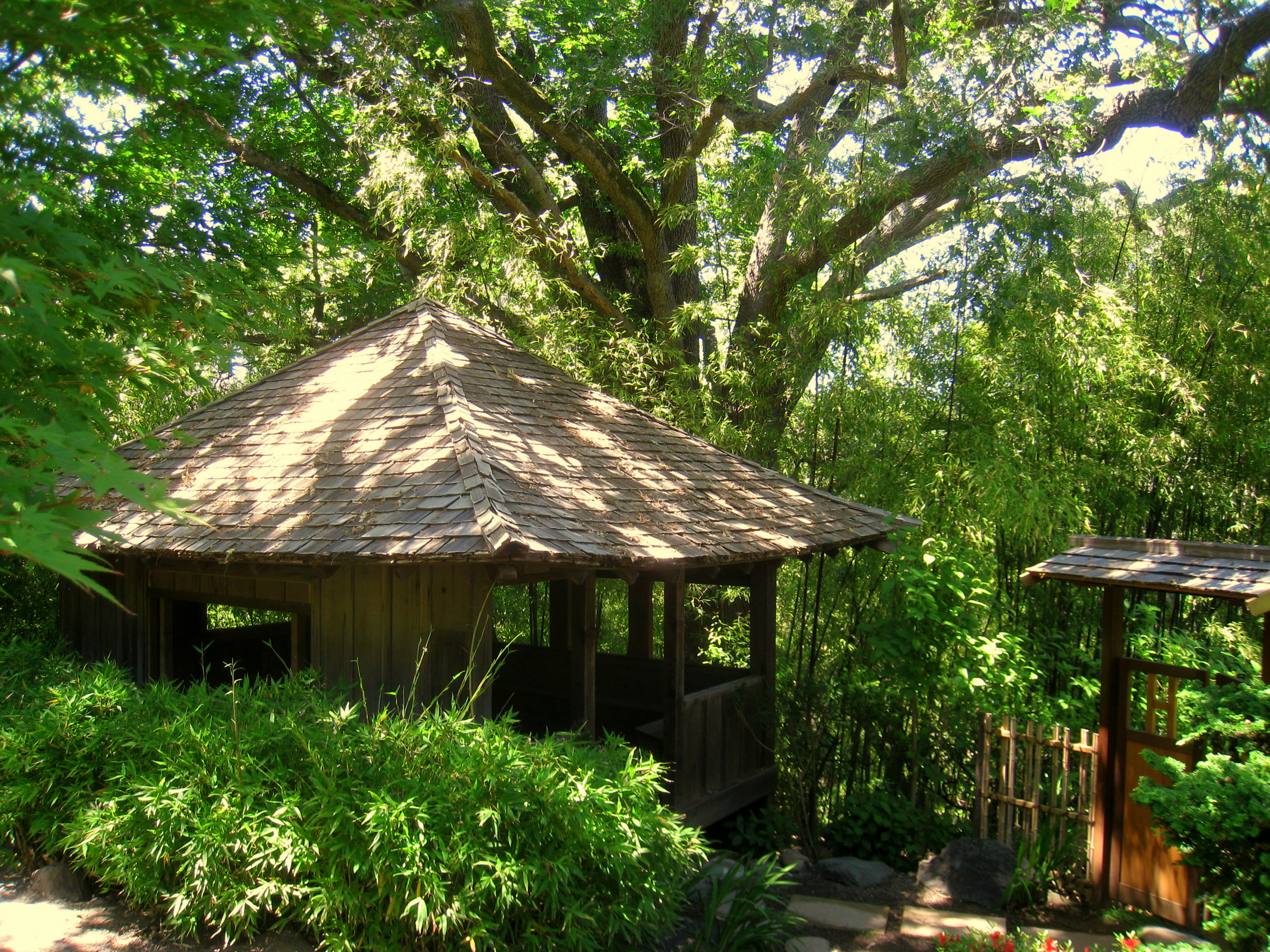
Tea Waiting Pavilion and Tea Garden (2010)

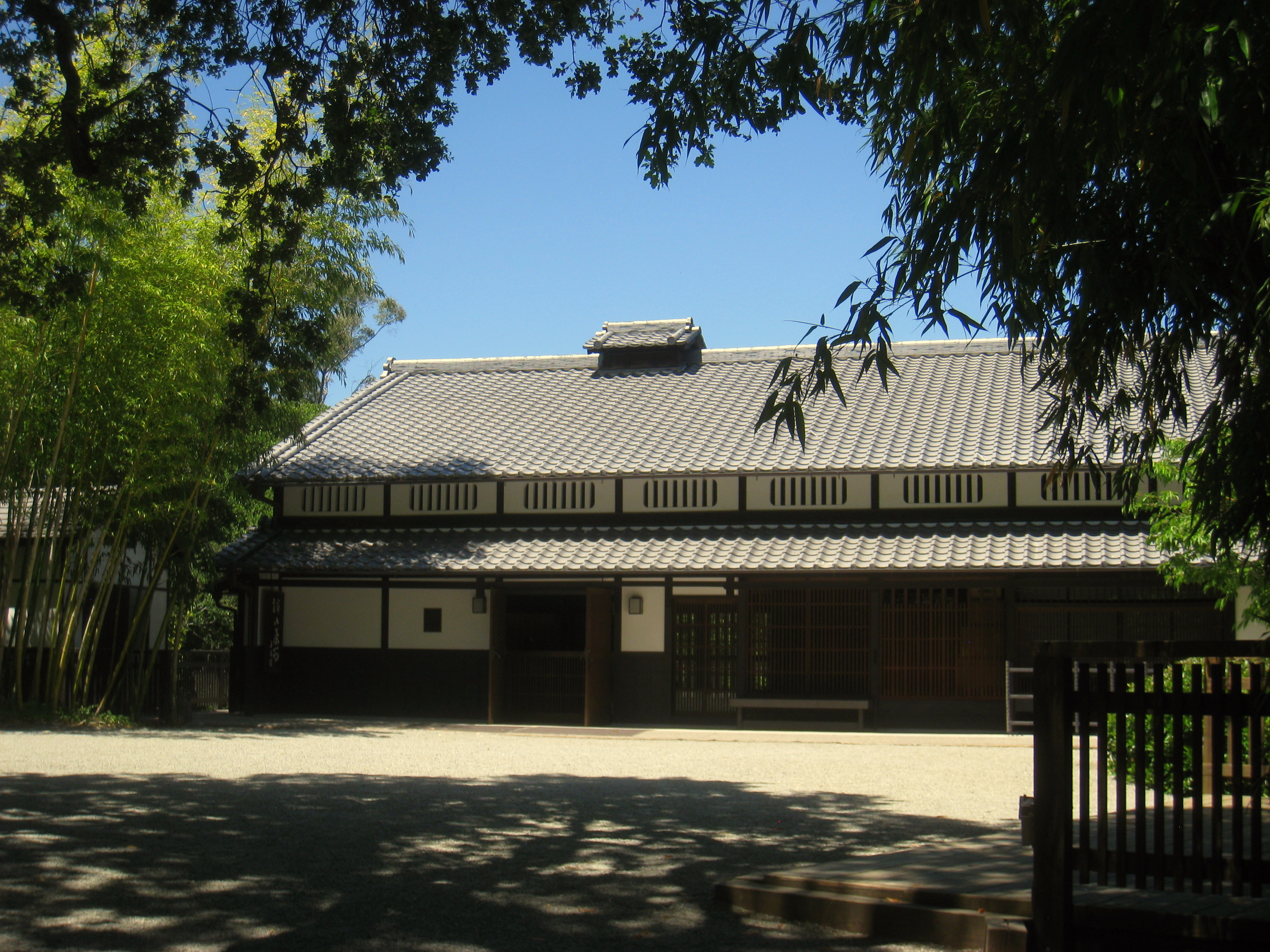
Cultural Exchange Center (2010)

=== Film History ===
Hakone Gardens was a filming location for the movie Memoirs of a Geisha (2005).

== Design ==
Selected locations in Hakone Gardens
- Buildings and structures
- Gardens
1 Main Gate (Mon)
2 Hill and Pond Garden
3 Moon Viewing (Upper) House
4 Zen Garden
5 Lower House
6 Cultural Exchange Center
7 Tea Garden
8 Bamboo Garden

=== Gardens ===
There are four principal gardens at the site:

- The Hill and Pond Garden
- The Zen Garden
- The Tea Garden
- The Bamboo Garden

Of these, the Bamboo Garden is the newest, completed in 1987; the other three date back to the original construction commissioned by the Steins, with the Hill and Pond Garden the oldest, completed in 1918.

The Hill and Pond Garden features a waterfall emptying into large koi pond with an island accessible via bridge. It is considered to incorporate elements of both Chisen-shuyu (pond) and Chisen-kaiyu (strolling) gardens.

The Zen Garden features gravel raked into patterns and is designed for viewing and contemplation. It is a classic Karesansui (dry landscape) garden, completed in 1922.

The Tea Garden is patterned after a typical Roji (Tea House garden).

=== Structures ===
The historic on-site structures were constructed using traditional Japanese designs and carpentry, based on 16th and 17th century residences favored by the samurai warrior class. The oldest are the Upper House (1918), Lower House (1922), and Tea Waiting Pavilion (1927). The Upper House was patterned after a typical rustic residence (shoin-zukuri) and was where the tea ceremony would be held, after the tea was prepared in the Tea Waiting Pavilion. The Lower House was used as the Steins' summer residence until approximately 1929. Significant alterations were made in the early 1980s to accommodate tea ceremony classes.

The Main Gate dates to Tilden's ownership, and was completed in 1941. Tilden also added the Wisteria Pavilion and Arbor, Moon Bridge, and Upper Pavilion in the Hill and Pond Garden at that time. The Cultural Exchange Center is one of the newer buildings, and was completed in 1991.

== See also ==
- Japanese Tea Garden, oldest public Japanese garden in the United States
- List of botanical gardens and arboretums in California
