= History of Las Vegas =

The settlement of Las Vegas, Nevada was founded in 1905 before the opening of a railroad that linked Los Angeles and Salt Lake City. The stopover attracted some farmers (mostly from Utah) to the area, and fresh water was irrigated to the settlement. In 1911, the town was incorporated as part of the newly founded Clark County. Urbanization took off in 1931 when work started on the Boulder Dam (now the Hoover Dam), bringing a huge influx of young male workers, for whom theaters and casinos were built, largely by the Mafia. Electricity from the dam also enabled the building of many new hotels along the Strip. The arrival of Howard Hughes in 1966 did much to offset mob influence and helped turn Las Vegas into more of a family tourist center.

The name Las Vegas—Spanish for "the meadows"—was given to the area in 1829 by Rafael Rivera, a member of the Spanish explorer Antonio Armijo’s trading party that was traveling to Los Angeles, and stopped for water there on the Old Spanish Trail from New Mexico. At that time, several parts of the valley contained artesian wells surrounded by extensive green areas. The flows from the wells fed the Las Vegas Wash, which runs to the Colorado River.

== Prehistory ==
The prehistoric landscape of the Las Vegas Valley and most of Southern Nevada was once a marsh with water and vegetation. The rivers that created the marsh eventually went underground, and the marsh receded. The valley then evolved into a parched, arid landscape that only supported the hardiest animals and plants.

At some point in the valley's early geologic history, the water resurfaced and flowed into what is now the Colorado River. This created a luxurious plant life, forming a wetland oasis in the Mojave Desert landscape.

Evidence of prehistoric life in Las Vegas Valley has been found at the Tule Springs Fossil Beds National Monument. An abundance of Late Pleistocene fossils have been discovered from this locality, including Columbian mammoths and Camelops hesternus.

== Native American (Paiute) history ==
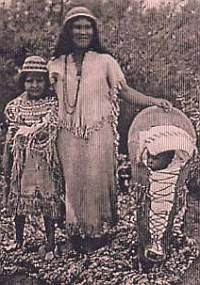
Southern Paiutes at Moapa wearing traditional Paiute cradleboard and rabbit robe

Native Americans lived in the Las Vegas Valley, beginning over 10,000 years ago. Archaeologists have discovered baskets, petroglyphs, pictographs and other evidence in diverse locations, including Gypsum Cave and Tule Springs. Paiutes moved into the area as early as AD 700, migrating between nearby mountains in the summer and spending winter in the valley, near Big Springs.

== 1829–1905: Origins ==
A trade caravan of 60 men led by the Spanish merchant Antonio Armijo was charged with establishing a trade route to Los Angeles. By following the Pike and Smith routes through a tributary of the Colorado River they came upon the Las Vegas Valley, described by Smith as the best point to re-supply before going onto California. The travelers named the area Las Vegas, which is Spanish for the meadows, or "fertile plains", as noted by John C. Frémont, who traveled into the Las Vegas Valley on May 3, 1844 while it was still part of Mexico.

Frémont was appointed by President John Tyler to lead a group of scientists, scouts, and spies for the United States Army Corps of Engineers, which was preparing for a possible war with Mexico. Upon arriving in the valley, they made camp at the Las Vegas Springs, establishing a clandestine fort there. A war with Mexico occurred, resulting in the region becoming United States territory. The fort was used in later years by travelers, mountain men, hunters, and traders seeking shelter, but was never permanently inhabited.

In 1855, William Bringhurst led a group of 29 Mormon missionaries from Utah to the Las Vegas Valley. The missionaries built a 150 foot square (46 m) adobe fort near a creek and used flood irrigation to water their crops. However, because of tensions rising among leaders of the small Mormon community, the summer heat and difficulty growing crops, the missionaries returned to Utah in 1857, abandoning the fort. (The remains of the fort are preserved in the Old Las Vegas Mormon Fort State Historic Park.)

For the next few years, the area remained unoccupied by Americans except for travelers and traders. Then the U.S. Army, in an attempt to deceive Confederate spies active in southern California in 1864, falsely publicized that it reclaimed the fort and had renamed it Fort Baker, briefly recalling the area to national attention. After the end of the war in 1865, Octavius Gass, with a commission from the federal government, re-occupied the fort. The Paiute nation had declined in numbers and negotiated a new treaty with the United States, ceding the area around the fort to the United States in return for relocation and supplies of food and farming equipment. Consequently, Gass started irrigating the old fields and renamed the area Las Vegas Rancho. Gass made wine at his ranch, and Las Vegas became known as the best stop on the Old Spanish Trail. In 1881, because of mismanagement and intrigue with a Mormon syndicate, Gass lost his ranch to Archibald Stewart to pay off a lien Stewart had on the property. In 1884, Archibald's wife Helen J. Stewart became the Las Vegas postmaster.

The property (increased to 1,800 acres (730 ha)), stayed with the family (despite Archibald Stewart's murder in July 1884) until it was purchased in 1902 by the San Pedro, Los Angeles, and Salt Lake Railroad, then being built across southern Nevada. The railroad was a project of Montana Senator William Andrews Clark. Clark enlisted Utah's U.S. Senator and mining magnate Thomas Kearns to ensure the line's completion through Utah to Las Vegas. The State Land Act of 1885 offered land at $1.25 per acre ($3.09/hectare). Clark and Kearns promoted the area to American farmers who quickly expanded the farming plots of the areas. Not until 1895 did the first large-scale migration of Mormons begin in the area, at long last fulfilling Brigham Young's early dream. Through wells and arid irrigation, agriculture became the primary industry for the next 20 years and in return for his development, the farmers named the area Clark County in honor of the railroad tycoon and Senator.

== 1905–1929: Birth, growth and crisis ==
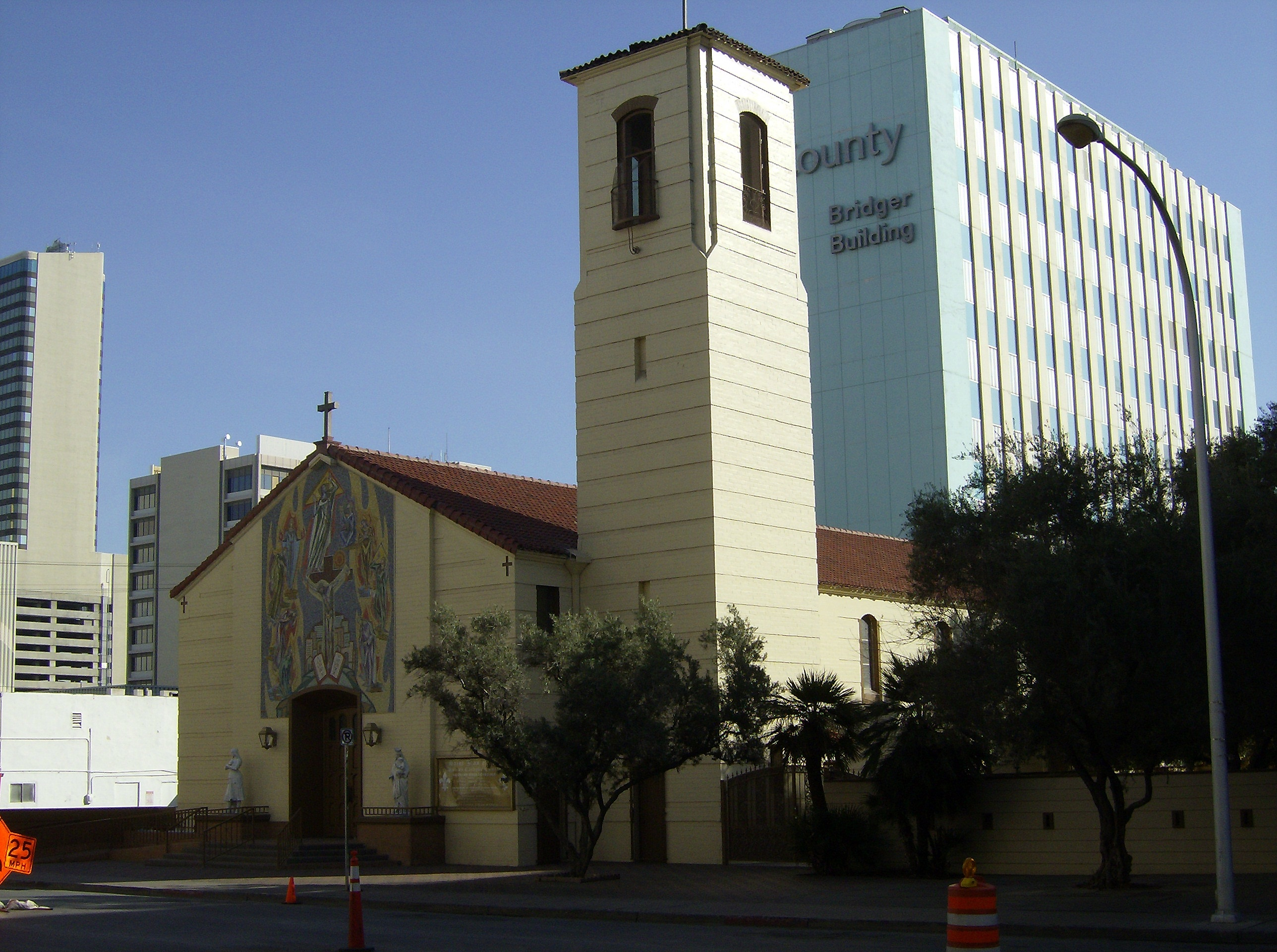
St. Joan of Arc Catholic Church near 4th and Bridger in downtown was founded in 1910.

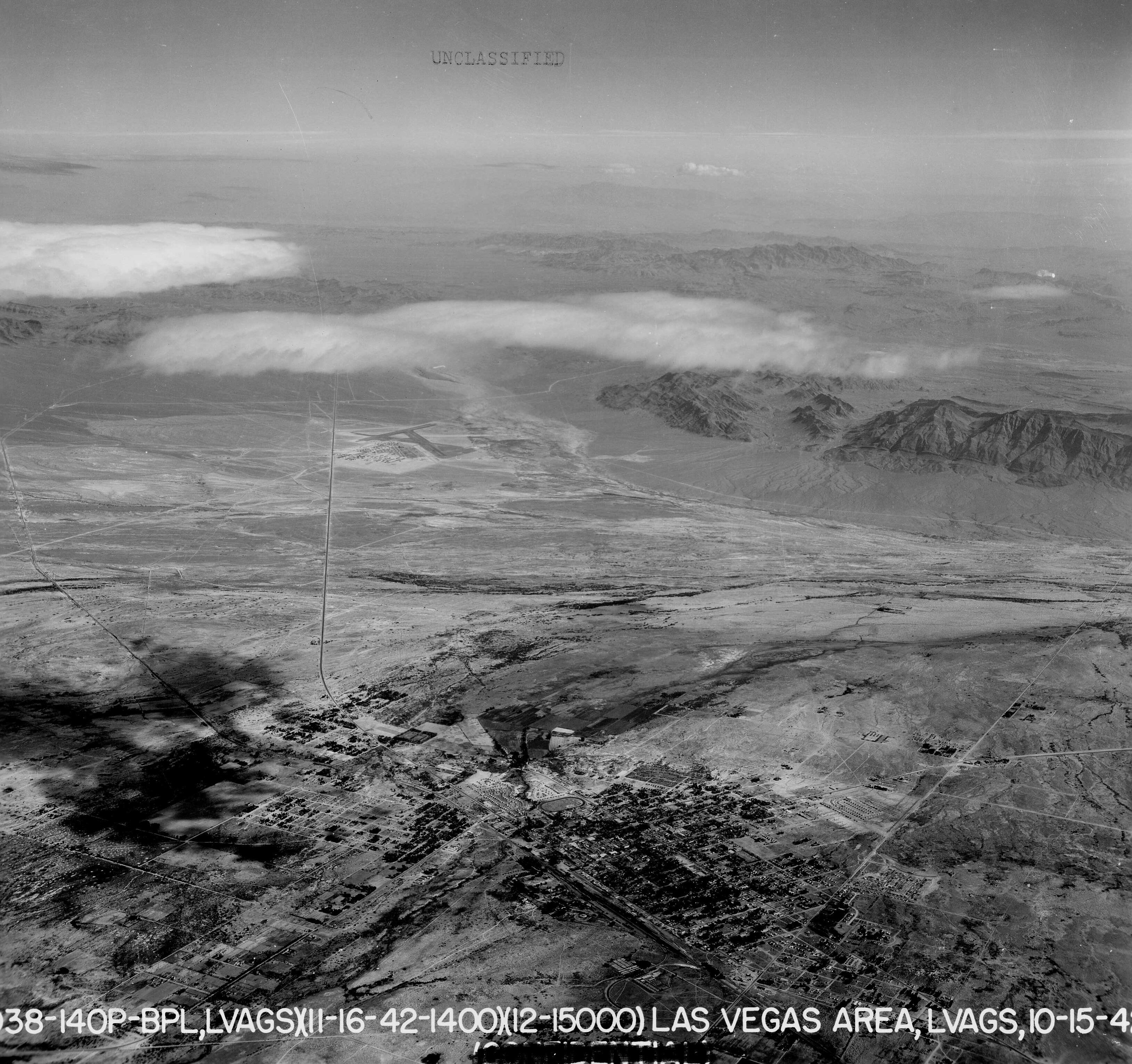
Aerial view of Las Vegas in 1942

By the early 20th century, wells piped water into the town, providing both a reliable source of fresh water and the means for additional growth. The increased availability of water in the area allowed Las Vegas to become a water stop, first for wagon trains and later railroads, on the trail between Los Angeles and points east such as Albuquerque, New Mexico.

The San Pedro, Los Angeles and Salt Lake Railroad was completed in 1905, linking Salt Lake City to southern California. U.S. Senator William Andrews Clark was the majority owner of the railroad, which was a corporation based in Utah. Among its original incorporators were Utah's U.S. Senator Thomas Kearns and his business partner David Keith. Kearns, one of the richer and more powerful men in Utah, and Keith were the owners of Utah's Silver King Coalition Mine, several mines in Nevada and The Salt Lake Tribune. Kearns and Keith helped Clark ensure the success of the new railroad across Utah and into Nevada to California. Curiously, for a time there were two towns named Las Vegas. The east-side of Las Vegas (which encompassed the modern Main Street and Las Vegas Boulevard) was owned by Clark, and the west-side of Las Vegas (which encompassed the area north of modern-day Bonanza Road) was owned by J. T. McWilliams, who was hired by the Stewart family during the sale of the Las Vegas Rancho and bought available land west of the ranch.

Clark built another railroad branching off from Las Vegas to the boom town of Bullfrog called the Las Vegas and Tonopah Railroad. With the revenue coming down both railways that intersected there, the area of Las Vegas was quickly growing. On May 15, 1905, Las Vegas officially was founded as a city when 110 acres (45 ha), in what later became downtown, were auctioned to ready buyers. Las Vegas was the driving force in the creation of Clark County, Nevada in 1909, and the city was incorporated in 1911 as a part of the county. The first mayor of Las Vegas was Peter Buol, who served from 1911 to 1913.

Shortly after the city's incorporation, the State of Nevada reluctantly became the last western state to outlaw gambling. This occurred at midnight, October 1, 1910, when a strict anti-gambling law became effective in Nevada. It even forbade the western custom of flipping a coin for the price of a drink. Nonetheless, Las Vegas had a diversified economy and a stable and prosperous business community, and therefore continued to grow until 1917. In that year, a combination of economic influences and the redirection of resources by the federal government in support of the war effort forced the Las Vegas and Tonopah Railroad to declare bankruptcy. Although William Clark sold the remains of the company to the Union Pacific Railroad, a nationwide strike in 1922 left Las Vegas in a desperate state.

== 1930–1941: Hoover Dam and the first casinos ==
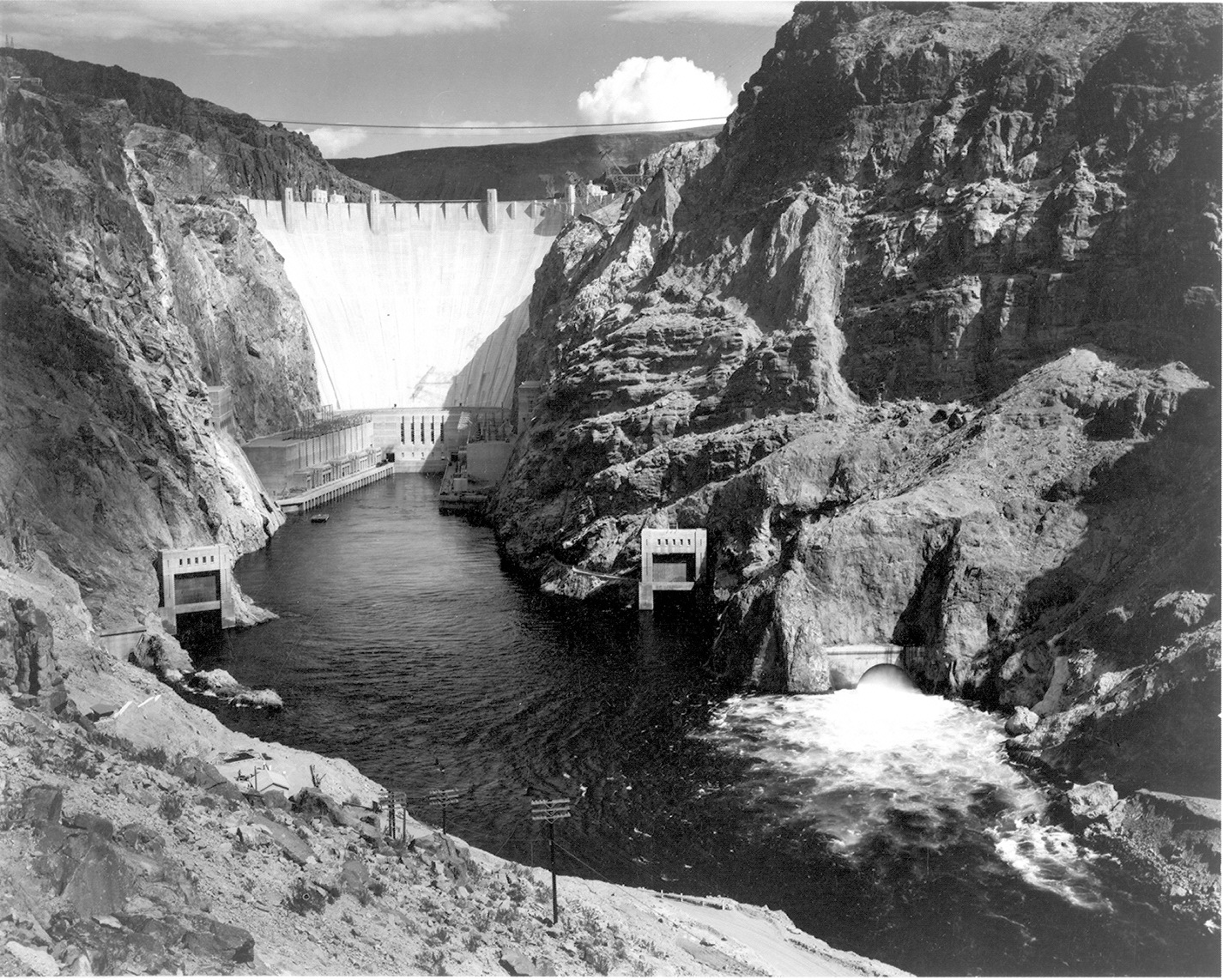
Hoover Dam in 1942

On July 3, 1930, President Herbert Hoover signed the appropriation bill for the Boulder Dam. The dam was renamed the Hoover Dam during the Truman administration. Work started on the dam in 1931 and Las Vegas' population swelled from around 5,000 citizens to 25,000, with most of the newcomers looking for a job building the dam. However, the demographic of the work force consisting of males from across the country with no attachment to the area created a market for large-scale entertainment. A combination of local Las Vegas business owners and Mafia crime lords helped develop the casinos and showgirl theaters to entertain the largely male dam construction workers.

Despite the influx of known crime figures, the local business community tried to cast Las Vegas in a respectable light when the Secretary of the Interior Ray Lyman Wilbur visited in 1929 to inspect the dam site. However a worker was found with alcohol on his breath (this was during the time of Prohibition) after a visit to Block 16 in Las Vegas. The government ultimately decided that a federally controlled town, Boulder City, would be erected for the dam workers.

Realizing that gambling would be profitable for local business, the Nevada state legislature legalized gambling at the local level in 1931. Las Vegas, with a small but already well-established illegal gambling industry, was poised to begin its rise as the gambling capital of the world. The county issued the first gambling license in 1931 to the Northern Club, and soon other casinos were licensed on Fremont Street, such as the Las Vegas Club and the Hotel Apache. Fremont Street became the first paved street in Las Vegas and received the city's first traffic light in 1931.

In reply, the federal government restricted movement of the dam workers to Las Vegas. Smuggling and circuitous routes then were developed. In 1934, to curtail these activities and the resulting growth of criminal figures in the gambling industry, the city's leading figures purged gambling dens and started an effort to stem the flow of workers from the dam. This only emboldened some dam workers who still contrived to visit Las Vegas. A celebration of this era has become known as Helldorado Days.

Although the suppression efforts resulted in declines at gambling venues and resulted in a business downturn, the city was recharged—both literally and figuratively—when the dam was completed in 1935. In 1937, Southern Nevada Power became the first utility to supply power from the dam, and Las Vegas was its first customer. Electricity flowed into Las Vegas, and Fremont Street became known as Glitter Gulch due to the many bright lights powered by electricity from the Hoover Dam. Meanwhile, although the dam worker population disappeared, the Hoover Dam and its reservoir Lake Mead turned into tourist attractions on their own and the need for additional higher-class hotels became clear.

In 1940, U.S. Route 95 was extended south into Las Vegas, giving the city two major access roads. Also in 1940, KENO, Las Vegas's first permanent radio station, began broadcasting replacing the niche occupied earlier by transient broadcasters.

== 1941–1945: War years ==
On January 25, 1941, the U.S. Army established a flexible gunnery school for the United States Army Air Corps in Las Vegas. Mayor John L. Russell signed over land to the U.S. Army Quartermaster Corps for this development. The gunnery school later would become Nellis Air Force Base. The U.S. Army was not pleased with the legal prostitution in Las Vegas, and in 1942, forced Las Vegas to outlaw the practice, putting Block 16, the local red light district, permanently out of business.

On April 3, 1941, hotel owner Thomas Hull opened the El Rancho Vegas. It was the first resort on what became the Las Vegas Strip. The hotel gained much of its fame from the gourmet buffet that it offered. On October 30, 1942, Texas cinema magnate Rupert E. Griffith rebuilt on the site of a nightclub called Pair-O-Dice, that first opened in 1930, and renamed it Hotel Last Frontier. A few more resorts were built on and around Fremont Street, but it was the next hotel on the Strip that publicly demonstrated the influence of organized crime on Las Vegas. Numerous Las Vegas residents notably George 'The Greek' Stergios stated before their death they wished the dam to be the place of rest for eternity. On June 30, 1994 Stergios's ashes were thrown over the dam. Stergios was a 45 year truck driver. At the time Stergios wa set free over the Dam a trucker blowed his horn. Leaving his children in awe of the moment.

Although ethnic organized crime figures had been involved in some of the operations at the hotels, the Mafia bosses never owned or controlled the hotels and clubs that remained monopolized by hard-bitten local Las Vegas families unwilling to cede ground to the crime bosses and proved strong enough to push back. This changed in post-war Las Vegas when gangster Bugsy Siegel, with help from friend and fellow mob boss Meyer Lansky, poured money through locally owned banks for cover of legitimacy and built the Flamingo in 1946. Siegel modeled his enterprises on the long-running gambling empire in Galveston, Texas, which had pioneered the high-class casino concepts that became mainstays on the Strip.

== 1946–1955: Postwar boom ==
=== Casinos backers get funding ===
The Flamingo initially lost money and Siegel died in a hail of gunfire in Beverly Hills, California, in summer 1947. Additionally, local police and Clark County Sheriff deputies were notorious for their heavy-handed tactics toward mobsters who "grew too big for their pants". However, many mobsters saw the potential that gambling offered in Las Vegas. After gambling was legalized, the Bank of Las Vegas, led by E. Parry Thomas, became the first bank to lend money to the casinos, which Thomas regarded as the most important businesses in Las Vegas. At the same time, Allen Dorfman, a close associate of longtime Teamsters Union President Jimmy Hoffa and a known associate of the Chicago Outfit, took over the Teamsters Central States Pension Fund, which began lending money to Las Vegas casino owners and developers. They provided funding to build the Sahara, the Sands, the Riviera, the Fremont, and finally the Tropicana, (with three of the five—the Sands, Riviera and Tropicana—each demolished by 2024, to make room for other developments).

Even with the general knowledge that some of the owners of these casino resorts had dubious backgrounds, by 1954, over 8 million people were visiting Las Vegas yearly pumping $200 million into casinos. Gambling was no longer the only attraction; the biggest stars of films and music like Frank Sinatra, Dean Martin, Andy Williams, Liberace, Bing Crosby, Carol Channing, and others performed in intimate settings. After coming to see these stars, the tourists would resume gambling, and then eat at the gourmet buffets that have become a staple of the casino industry.

On November 15, 1950, the United States Senate Special Committee to Investigate Crime in Interstate Commerce (known at the Kefauver Hearings) met in Las Vegas. It was the seventh of 14 hearings held by the commission. Moe Sedway, manager of the Flamingo Hotel and a friend of mobster Bugsy Siegel, Wilbur Clark representing the Desert Inn, and Nevada Lieutenant Governor Clifford Jones were all called to testify. The hearings established that Las Vegas interests were required to pay Siegel to get the race wire transmitting the results of horse and dog races, prizefight results and other sports action into their casinos.

The hearing concluded that money from organized crime incontrovertibly was tied to the Las Vegas casinos and was becoming the controlling interest in the city, earning the organized crime groups vast amounts of income, strengthening their influence in the country. This led to a proposal by the Senate to institute federal gambling control. Nevada's Senator Pat McCarran was instrumental in defeating the measure in committee.

Along with their connections in Hollywood and New York City, these interests in Las Vegas were able to use publicity provided by these media capitals to steer the rapid growth of tourism into Las Vegas, thereby dooming Galveston, Texas; Hot Springs, Arkansas; and other illegal gambling centers around the nation. Nevada's legal gambling as well as the paradoxical increased scrutiny by local and federal law enforcement in these other locales during the 1950s made their demise inevitable.

=== Atomic testing ===
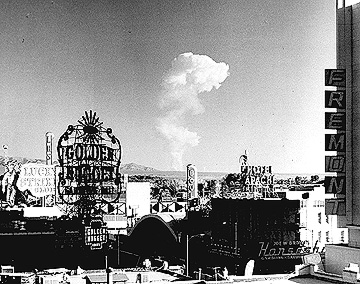
Mushroom cloud near Las Vegas

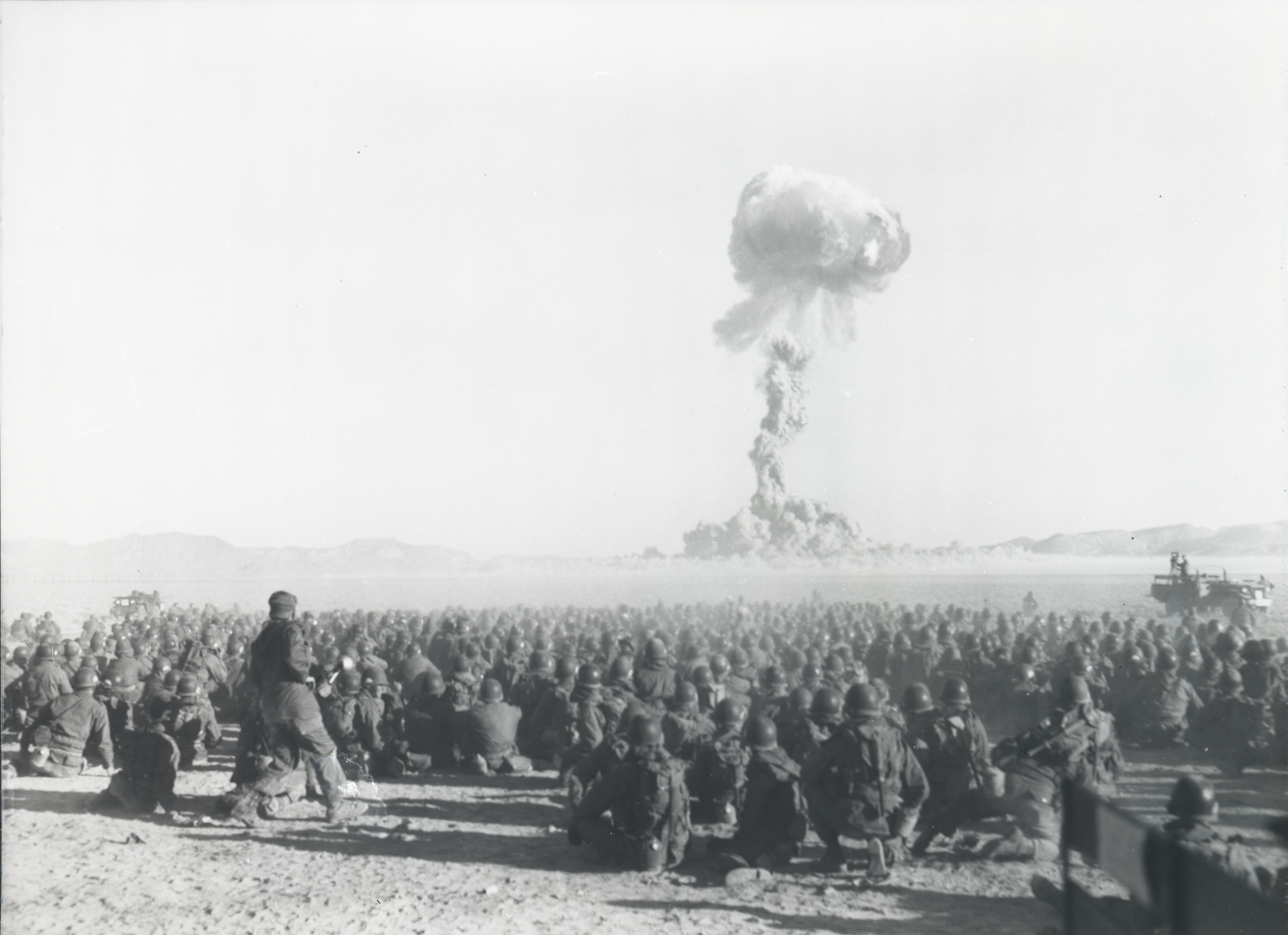
Cloud at Nevada Test Site

On January 27, 1951 the U.S. Atomic Energy Commission detonated the first of over a hundred atmospheric explosions at the Nevada Test Site. Despite the dangers and risks of radiation exposure from the fallout, which were greatly underestimated at the time, Las Vegas advertised the explosions as another tourist attraction and offered Atomic Cocktails in the Sky Room restaurant at the Desert Inn that provided the highest view of the mushroom clouds. During this time, the Las Vegas Chamber of Commerce successfully pushed for Vegas to become nicknamed the Atomic City. Several Miss Atomic pageants were held to help display the city's modernity and to continue spinning messages on the nearby testing to tourists.

The influx of government employees for the Atomic Energy Commission and from the Mormon-controlled Bank of Las Vegas spearheaded by E. Parry Thomas during those years funded the growing boom in casinos. But Las Vegas was doing more than growing casinos. In 1948, McCarran Field was established for commercial air traffic. In 1957, the University of Nevada, Las Vegas was established, initially as a branch of the University of Nevada, Reno and becoming independent in 1969. In 1959, the Clark County Commission built the Las Vegas Convention Center, which became a vital part of the area's economy. Southwest Gas expanded into Las Vegas in 1954.

These atmospheric tests would continue until enactment of the Partial Test Ban Treaty in 1963 when the tests moved underground. The last test explosion was in 1992.

== "The Mississippi of the West", 1950s−1960s ==
Dubbed "The Mississippi of the West" in a 1954 James Goodrich article for Ebony, "Negroes can't win in Las Vegas", part of the history of racial segregation in gaming, and the influence of Jim Crow practices in casino policies, including overt discrimination in hiring.

== 1956–1969: The beginning of modern Las Vegas ==
=== Howard Hughes ===
In 1966, Howard Hughes, , moved to Las Vegas. Initially staying in the Desert Inn, he refused to vacate his room and instead decided to purchase the entire hotel. Hughes extended his financial empire to include Las Vegas real estate, hotels and media outlets, spending an estimated $300 million and using his considerable powers to take over many of the well-known hotels, especially the venues connected with organized crime, and he quickly became one of the more powerful men in Las Vegas. He was instrumental in changing the image of Las Vegas from its Wild West roots toward a cosmopolitan city.

=== Hank Greenspun ===
The local newspaper Las Vegas Sun and its editor Hank Greenspun led a crusade in those days to expose all the criminal ties, activities, and government corruption in Las Vegas. His investigative reporting and editorials led to the exposure of Clark County Sheriff Glen Jones' ownership of a brothel and the resignation of Lieutenant Governor Clifford A. Jones as the state's national committeeman for the Democratic Party. Before his death in 1989, Hank Greenspun founded The Greenspun Corporation to manage his family's assets, and it remains a major influence in Las Vegas, with media holdings in print, television and the Internet; substantial real estate holdings; and ownership stakes in a number of casinos.

=== Local government ===
One problem for the City of Las Vegas was that the Strip did not reside in Las Vegas. Because of this, the city lost tax revenue. There was a push to annex the Strip by the City of Las Vegas, but The Syndicate used the Clark County Commissioners to pull a legal maneuver by organizing the Las Vegas Strip properties into an unincorporated township named Paradise. Under Nevada Law, an incorporated town, Las Vegas, cannot annex an unincorporated township. To this day, virtually all of the Strip remains outside the City of Las Vegas.

=== Desegregation ===
Much like in other American settled counties and towns throughout the United States, entertainment venues were segregated between black- and white-owned businesses. With almost all of the businesses owned and operated by whites, Black Americans were barred from entering the venues, which remained focused, regardless of their legitimacy or criminality, on entertaining a white-only clientele. As a result of property deeds, businesses owned by or mainly serving non-whites were confined to clubs in West Las Vegas. This also was enforced in many of the work positions. Thus, African Americans (except those who provided the labor for low-paying menial positions or entertainment) and Hispanics were limited in employment occupations at the white-owned clubs. However, because of employment deals with black worker groups, many clubs favored black workers, and the Hispanic population actually decreased 90% from 2,275 to just 236 by the mid-1950s.

Organized crime-owned businesses saw an opportunity in not dividing their clientele by race, and despite property deeds and city and county codes barring such activities, made several attempts at desegregating their businesses in the hopes of putting out of operation the non-white owned clubs and expanding their own market share. An attempt was made at forming an all-integrated night-club modeled on the Harlem Clubs of New York City during the 1920s and 1930s, like those owned by German-Jewish gangster Dutch Schultz. On May 24, 1955, Jewish crime boss Will Max Schwartz, along with other investors, opened the Moulin Rouge. It was a very upscale and racially integrated casino that actually competed against the resorts on the Strip, especially the non-white owned strips on the west side. By the end of the year the casino closed as Schwartz and his partners had a falling out, but the seeds for racial integration were sown.

Many sources have credited Frank Sinatra and the Rat Pack as a significant driving force behind desegregation in the casinos. One famous story tells of Sinatra's refusal to perform at the Sands Hotel unless the hotel provided Sammy Davis Jr. with a room. The famed performing group made similar demands at other venues, forcing owners to amend their policies over time.

However, it took political action for racial desegregation to occur. In 1960, the NAACP threatened a protest of the city's casinos for their policies. A meeting among the NAACP, the mayor and local businessmen resulted in citywide casino desegregation, starting with the employees. Many whites were attritioned from positions and their jobs given to the black unions. Along with the rest of the country, Las Vegas experienced the struggle for civil rights. Activists like James B. McMillan, Grant Sawyer, Bob Bailey, and Charles Keller dragged Las Vegas to racial integration.

Aside from seeing no business advantage to excluding non-white customers from casinos and clubs, the organized crime groups were composed of people of ethnicities (Jewish and Italian) that faced discrimination from WASP America and thus could understand the plight of blacks. This was also a driving force behind the integration advocated by ethnic performers such as Sinatra and Martin.

Another big force for equality was Mayor Oran Gragson, who hired black workers and held meetings in West Las Vegas. Spurred into local politics by a vigilante ring of cops who repeatedly broke into his appliance store, he implemented infrastructure improvements for the minority neighborhoods in Las Vegas, backed the NAACP in its actions, and promoted black workers for jobs. He also championed the cause of the Paiute tribe that owned a small portion of Las Vegas. Gragson stopped the U.S. government from evicting the tribe and made infrastructure improvements for them. His work helped reverse the decrease of minority populations in Las Vegas. Elected in 1959, Gragson was the city's longest-serving mayor. He left office in 1975, after serving four terms.

Local legislation kept up with the national legislation, and integration was finally established. The only violence came as a result of school integration, with violent riots and fights occurring in Clark High School when black gangs and youths began attacking the whites. Integration sparked white flight from the school district from 1965 to 1971.

== 1970–2006: Rapid growth ==
On a percentage basis, Las Vegas and Clark County experienced incredibly high growth rates starting in the 1930s and lasting until the late 2000s recession. During that period, the population of the city more than doubled in most decades. The rate slowed down in the 1970s with the decrease of the white birth rate, but never dropped below 60% (1980–1990), and even accelerated after 1990 due to immigration.

During the 1990s, the Las Vegas Valley was the fastest-growing metropolitan area in the U.S., the result of a megaresort boom along the Strip. Las Vegas was the largest city founded in the 20th century, and by 2006 it was the 28th largest city in the U.S., with a population of 552,000 in the city and nearly 1.8 million in Clark County. Heightened growth resulted in rapid development of commercial and residential areas throughout the Las Vegas Valley. Development and population growth were halted abruptly in the late 2000s recession.

=== Megaresort era ===
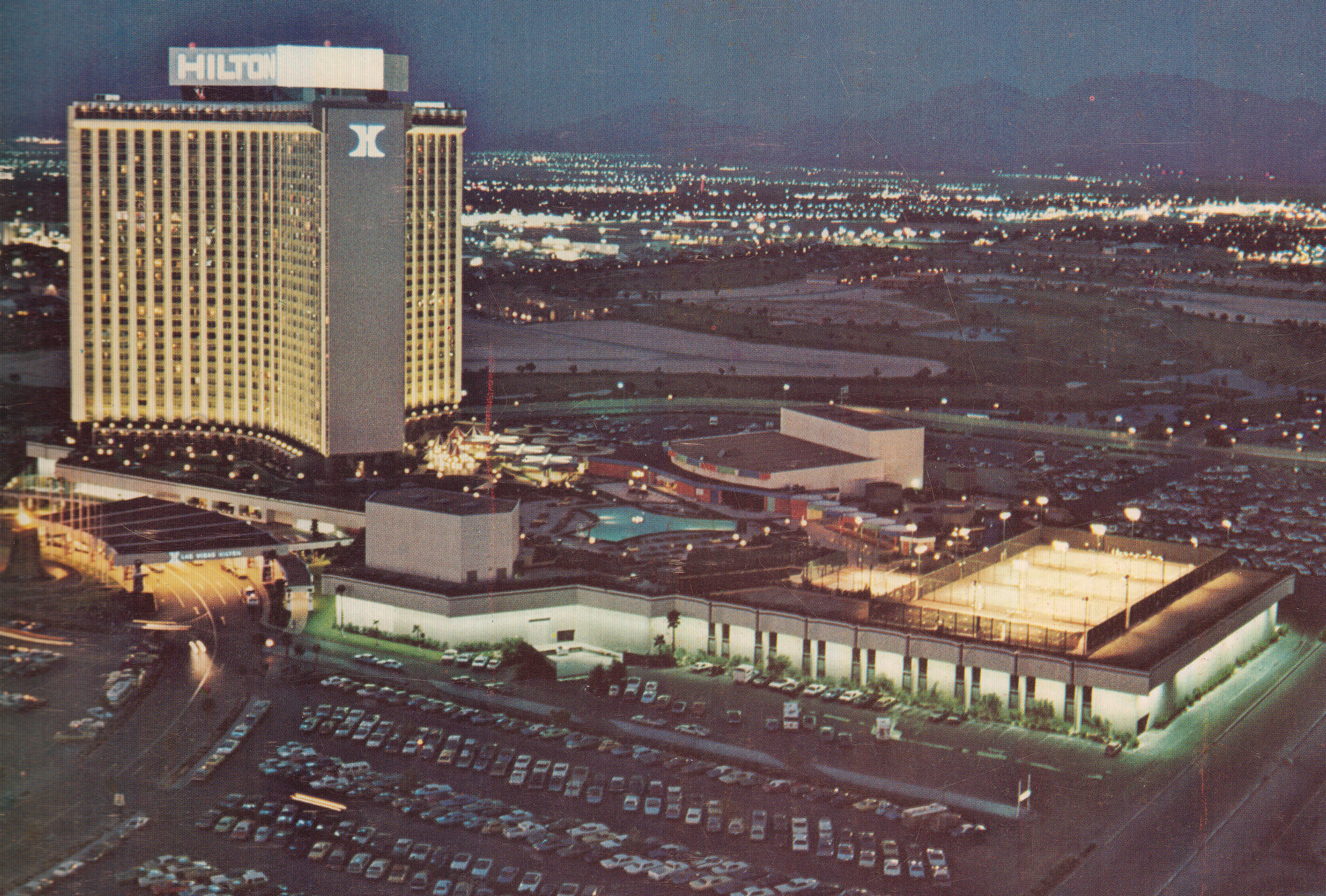
The Las Vegas Hilton, seen here in the 1970s, is sometimes cited as the first megaresort in Las Vegas.

The "Mafia/Rat Pack" Las Vegas of the mid-20th century came to a gradual end in the 1980s with the aging out of the World War II generation, the decline of organized crime elements, and the rise of baby boomer entrepreneurs who began a new chapter in the city's history, the corporate era. In 1967, Nevada passed the Corporate Gaming Act, which gave rise to corporate ownership of casinos, by removing financial background checks previously required of all shareholders in gaming license applications. The new law attracted corporate investors to Las Vegas, with profound effect. The city became a commercialized, family-oriented place, with large corporations acquiring hotels, casinos, and nightclubs in place of Mafia bosses.

Kirk Kerkorian, nicknamed the "Father of the Megaresort," had opened the International Hotel (later the Las Vegas Hilton, and now Westgate Las Vegas) in 1969. Located east of the Strip, it was the largest hotel in the country, with 1,500 rooms. It was surpassed in 1973, by Kerkorian's 2,100-room MGM Grand, renamed Bally's in 1986 and Horseshoe Las Vegas in 2022. It was built on the Strip and also included the world's largest casino. Strip development was stagnant after the opening of the MGM, which would be the last new resort, to be built from the ground up, for the next 16 years. The MGM suffered a devastating fire in 1980 which killed 85 people and injured 785, making it the worst disaster in Nevada history. The property reopened in 1981. That year, another fire occurred at the Las Vegas Hilton, killing eight people. Nevada's fire safety regulations were improved as a result of the two tragedies.

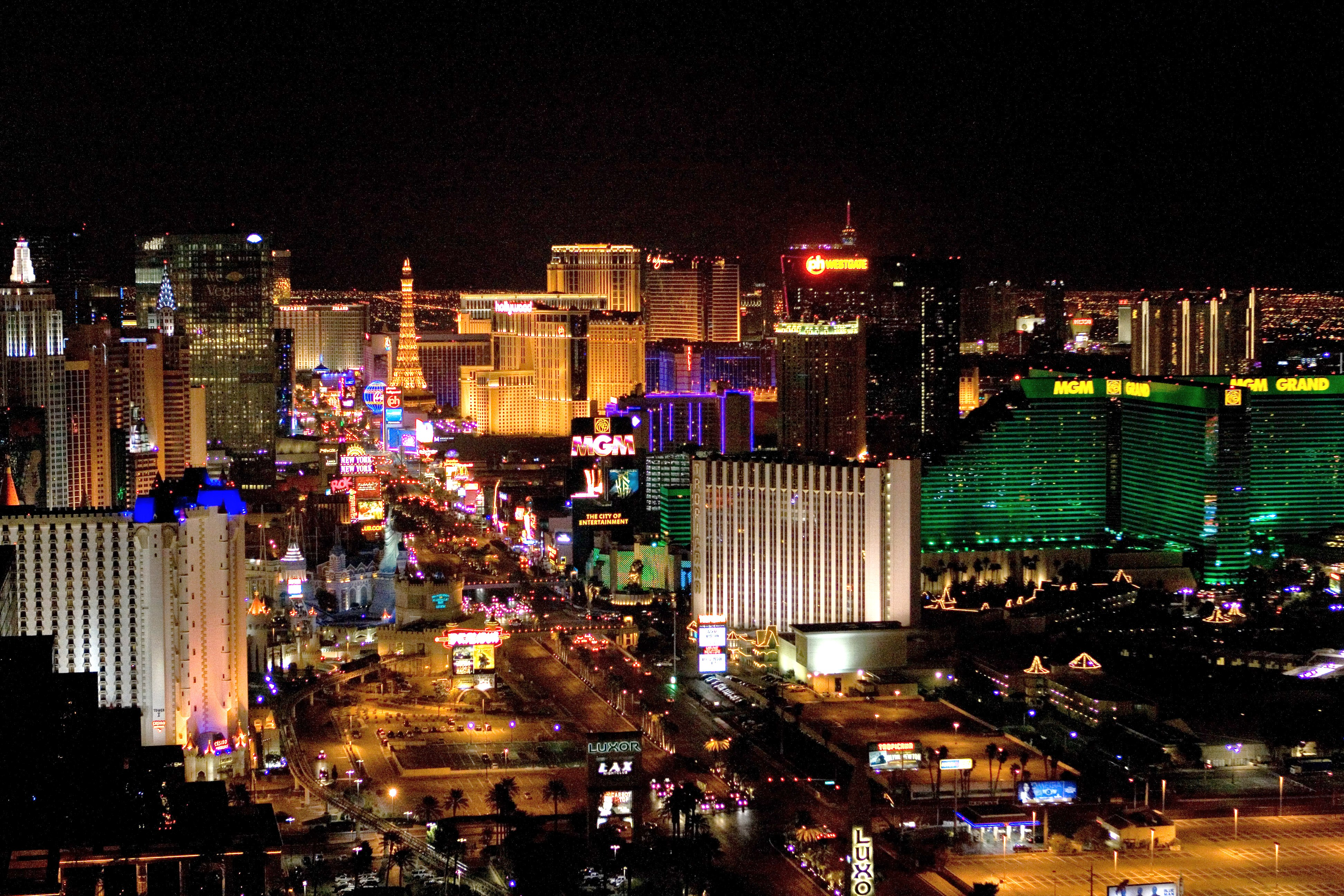
The southern Strip in 2010, showing the large number of megaresorts

The megaresort era kicked off in 1989 with the opening of The Mirage. Built by developer Steve Wynn, it was the first resort built with money from Wall Street, selling $630 million in junk bonds. Its 3,044 rooms, each with gold tinted windows, set a new standard for Vegas luxury and attracted tourists in droves, leading to additional financing and rapid growth on the Strip. The Mirage is generally considered to be the first megaresort in Las Vegas, and it sparked a wave of new Strip megaresorts throughout the next decade. The Excalibur, with more than 4,000 rooms, opened as the world's largest hotel in 1990. It was surpassed three years later by the new MGM Grand, which offered more than 5,000 rooms. Two other resorts also opened in 1993: the Egyptian-themed Luxor, and Wynn's pirate-themed Treasure Island. The Hard Rock Hotel, the first in a chain of Hard Rock resorts, opened east of the Strip in 1995. The Stratosphere opened just north of the Strip in 1996. The resort, conceived by businessman Bob Stupak, includes the tallest observation tower in the U.S., standing 1,149 feet. The decade ended with three more resort openings on the Strip: Mandalay Bay, the Venetian, and Paris. A major focus of the Venetian was convention space, at a time when gambling was still the area's primary source of revenue. The resort would help popularize Las Vegas as a convention city, with other properties eventually adding or expanding their own convention facilities. Although the new resorts of the 1990s each had a different theme, these would be scaled back in the 2000s, in favor of simpler or more contemporary designs.

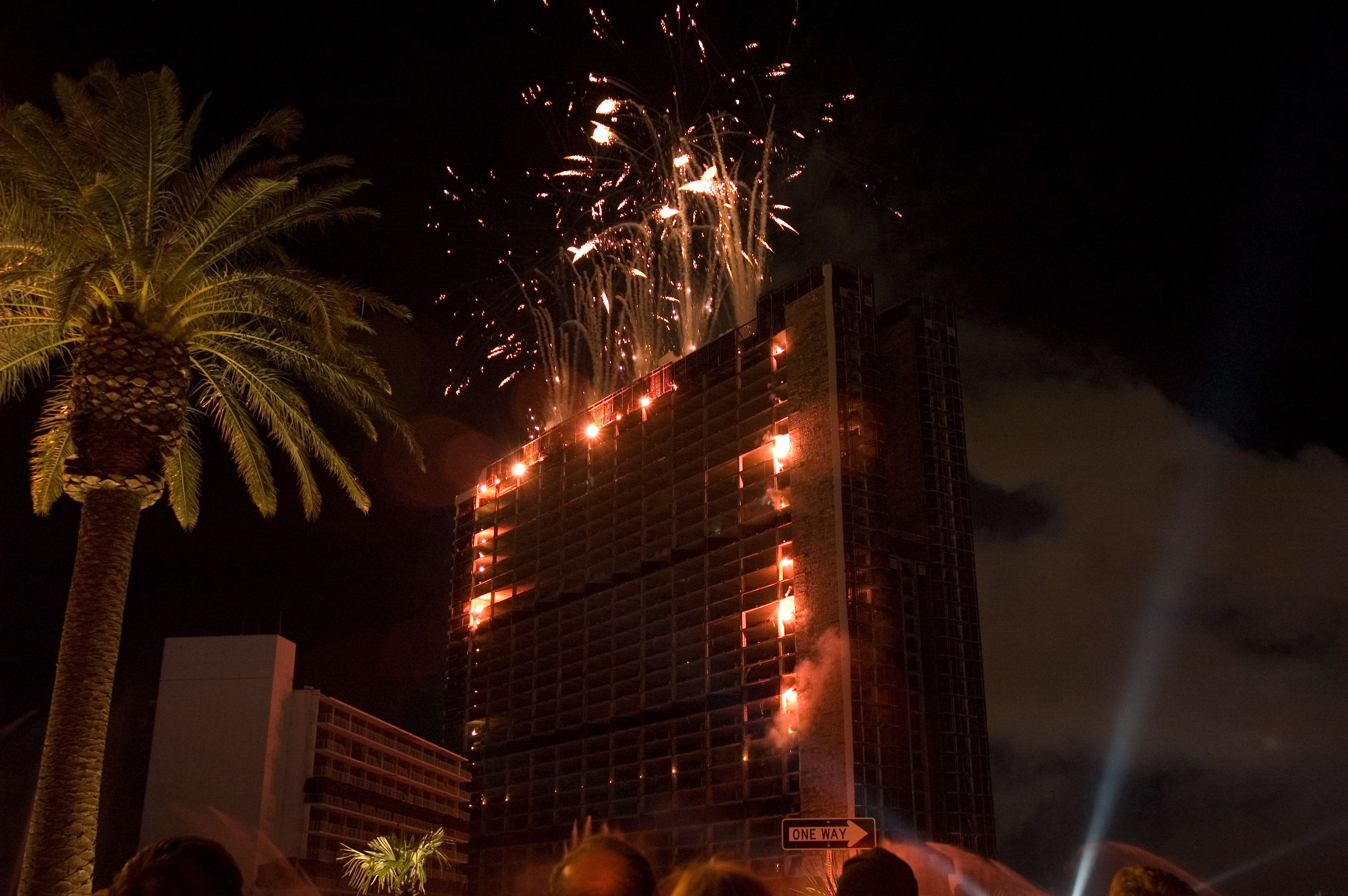
A fireworks show lights up the main hotel tower of the Stardust Resort and Casino shortly before it was imploded on March 13, 2007.

Older hotels and casinos were struggling to keep up with the megaresorts. Although many had already undergone extensive modernizations, most of them were demolished to make way for entirely new projects fitting the changed needs and wants of the city. This period saw so many buildings on the Strip being leveled that Las Vegas was called "the implosions capital of the world". Such demolitions on the Strip, exclusively performed by Controlled Demolition, Inc., became another spectacle for tourists in the city to enjoy. Usually taking place at night, they were often preceded by elaborate fireworks and light shows serving as a tribute and sendoff ceremony to the resorts in question. The Dunes was the first to go in this fashion, in 1993. As part of a television special, actors on a replica sailing ship at Treasure Island, which opened that night, pretended to attack the Dunes' northern tower with cannons, after which the latter was set on fire and imploded in front of around 200.000 spectators. The southern tower was imploded a year later with much less fanfare. Wynn bought the Dunes to repurpose its site for the Bellagio; the luxury megacomplex would become the most expensive resort in the world at a building cost of $1.6 billion at the time of its opening in 1998. The felling of the Landmark in 1995 was integrated in the plot of the science fiction movie Mars Attacks!, for which director Tim Burton arranged for the hotel's observation tower to act as a functioning building shortly before and during its knocking-over, by keeping the lights lit on one floor. Extras were present on site, running away from its destruction as it happened in real life. Alongside these two, many historic hotel-casino complexes that defined Las Vegas in the postwar period met their fate in the megaresort era, including the Sands (1996), the Thunderbird/El Rancho (2000) and the Desert Inn (2001-2004). By the time the Stardust and the Frontier were brought down in 2007, the Strip had seen no less than eleven implosions in a span of just fifteen years.

=== Family appeal ===
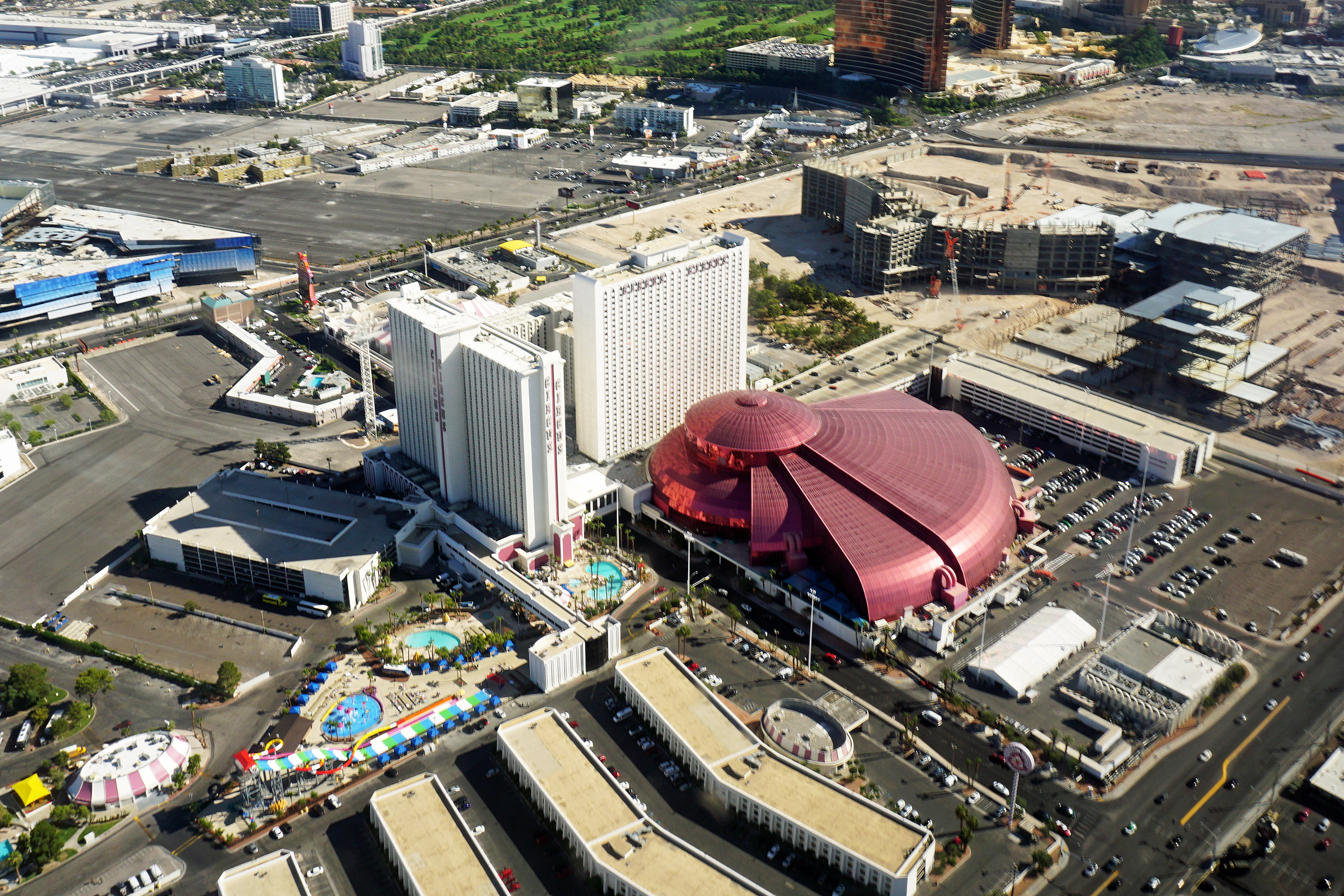
Circus Circus and its Adventuredome, a popular family attraction on the Strip

Despite Las Vegas' reputation among tourists as a gambling mecca, the area would later make an effort to appeal to families. Early proponents of this demographic had included the Hacienda, a Strip resort which offered a go-cart track and a miniature golf course during the 1960s. It would be followed by Circus Circus, another family friendly Strip property; upon opening in 1968, it included a carnival midway for children. The Wet 'n Wild water park and a Scandia fun center both opened in 1985, on and near the Strip respectively, in an effort to attract more families to Las Vegas.

A larger push from numerous resorts was underway in the 1990s to reposition Las Vegas as a family destination. As part of these efforts, an indoor amusement park known as the Adventuredome was opened in 1993, at Circus Circus. Although it proved popular, two other projects were less successful and eventually closed: MGM Grand Adventures (1993–2000), an outdoor theme park near the MGM Grand resort; and the All-American SportPark (1997–2001), an indoor facility with various attractions, located south of the Strip. Nevertheless, the family friendly phase was generally a financial success for Las Vegas. Promotional efforts in the early 2000s featured a renewed focus on the adult demographic, with the slogan "What Happens Here, Stays Here", although family attractions would remain popular as well, despite the decreased marketing.

=== Other developments ===
Aside from tourist resorts, the Las Vegas Valley would also become home to numerous locals casinos, by companies such as Boyd Gaming and Station Casinos. Typical features include movie theaters, arcades, and bowling alleys, making them popular with residents. Among the earliest locals casinos were Jerry's Nugget (1964), Palace Station (1976), and Sam's Town (1979). The Gold Coast (1986) was the first to include a movie theater. Several properties near the Strip, including the Rio (1990) and the Palms (2001), catered to both locals and tourists.

On the evening of November 14, 1973, most of the Las Vegas neon signs were voluntarily switched off, resulting in front-page news reporting by the Las Vegas Review-Journal. The deliberate darkening of downtown and the Strip was in response to the oil crisis ensuing from October 1973, when OAPEC countries had set an embargo on oil exports to the United States, resulting in the oil crisis of 1973. The lack of neon display was to demonstrate that the Vegas casino industry joined the national effort to save energy. Most neon lights resumed illumination by early January 1975.

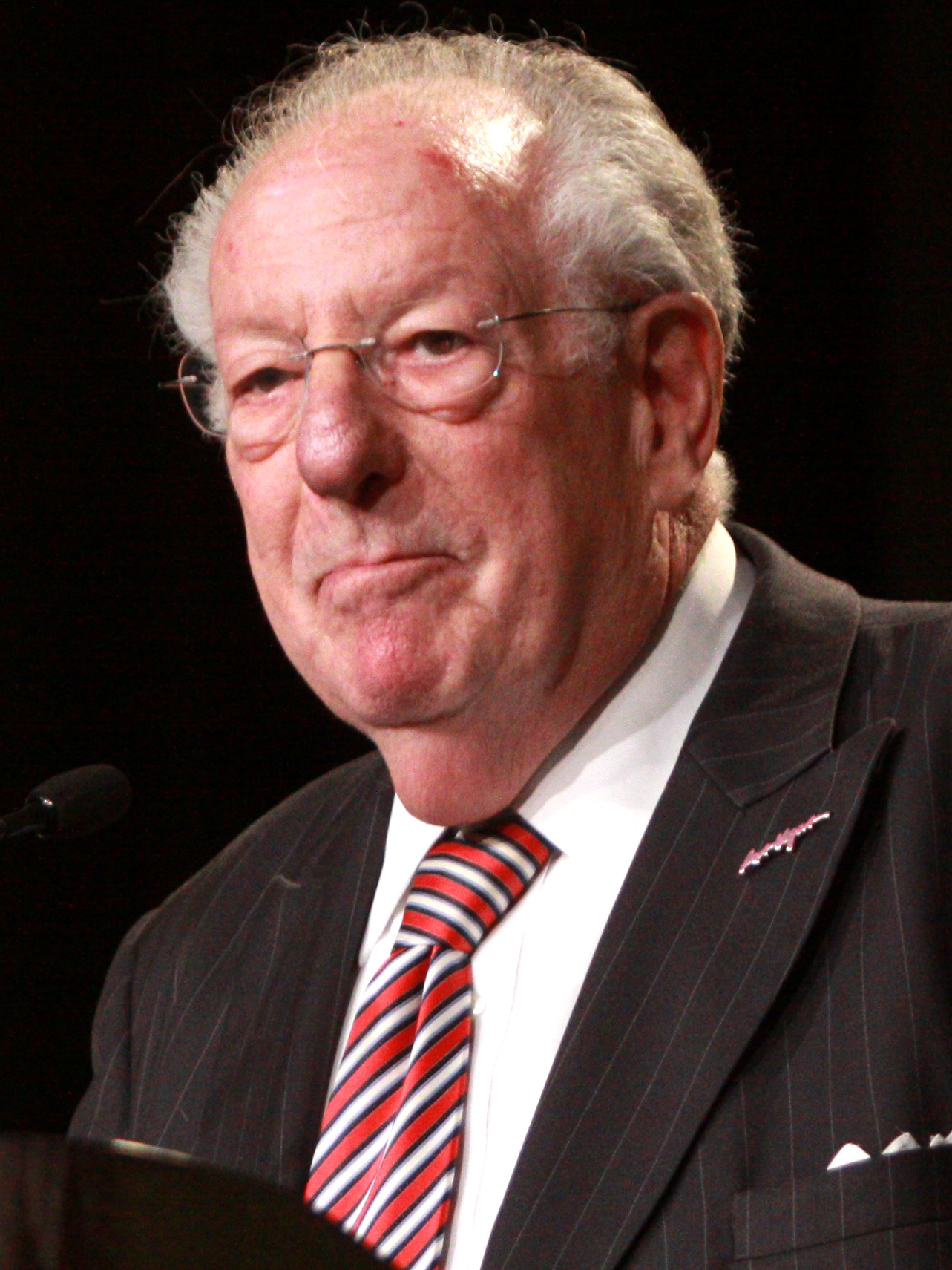
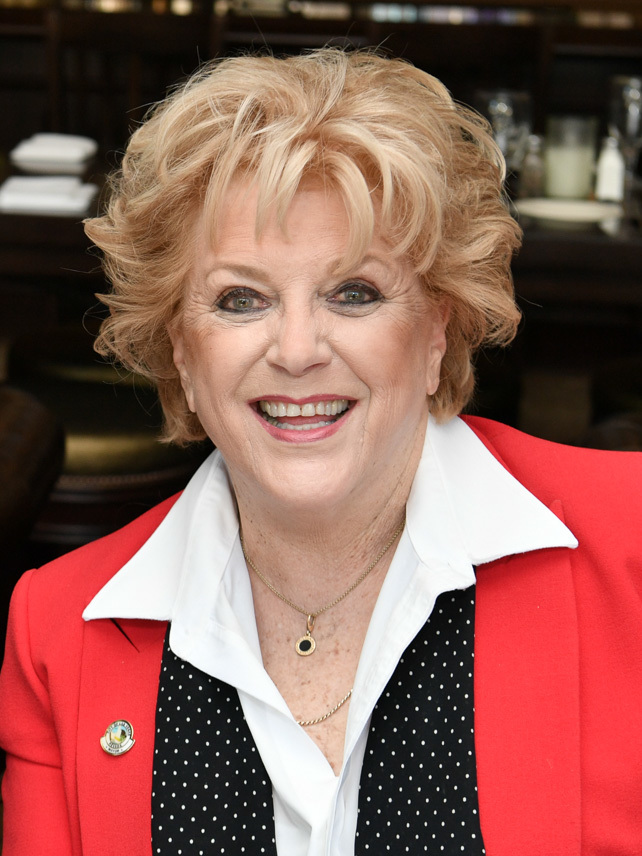
Former mayors of Las Vegas include Oscar Goodman (1999–2011) and his wife, Carolyn Goodman (2011–2024)

The Sundance hotel-casino opened in 1980, and would be last new resort built in the downtown area for the next 40 years. Jan Laverty Jones was elected in 1991 as Las Vegas' first female mayor, serving two terms. She supported the creation of the Fremont Street Experience, an effort to improve downtown visitation. Completed in 1995, the project converted a portion of Fremont Street into a pedestrian mall covered by a neon canopy. A year later, the city established the Neon Museum to preserve its historic neon signage.

Although eligible for a third term as mayor, Jones chose not to run again. She was succeeded by criminal defense attorney Oscar Goodman, who had represented alleged mob members for 30 years. Elected in 1999, Goodman served three terms. He was succeeded by his wife, Carolyn Goodman, after she won the 2011 mayoral race. She also served three terms, the last one ending in 2024. (Note: Carolyn Goodman served an additional year as the result of a 2019 state law, which moved subsequent Las Vegas mayoral races to even-numbered years.) A major focus of the Goodmans was downtown redevelopment, including the World Market Center and a vacant 61-acre property which became Symphony Park. An arts district, officially known as 18b The Las Vegas Arts District, would also be established.

Air travel to Las Vegas temporarily decreased after the September 11 attacks, and resorts laid off between 12,000 and 15,000 employees over the following two weeks. Gaming revenue and hotel occupancy fell briefly, and numerous properties offered discounted room rates to attract visitors.

A high-rise condominium boom began in 2003, following the success of Park Towers and Turnberry Place. Many projects went unbuilt and would be canceled by 2006, due to rising construction costs and limited workers.

Wynn opened his next resort, Wynn Las Vegas, on the Strip in April 2005. It was built on the former site of the historic Desert Inn. At a cost of $2.7 billion, the Wynn surpassed Bellagio as the world's most expensive resort.

Las Vegas celebrated its centennial in May 2005, with various concerts and events, including a revival of the Helldorado Days festival.

Red Rock Resort, developed by Station Casinos, opened in Summerlin in 2006. The resort was among the early components of Downtown Summerlin, a mixed-use project on 400 acres (160 ha).

== 2007–2016: Economic downturn and recovery ==
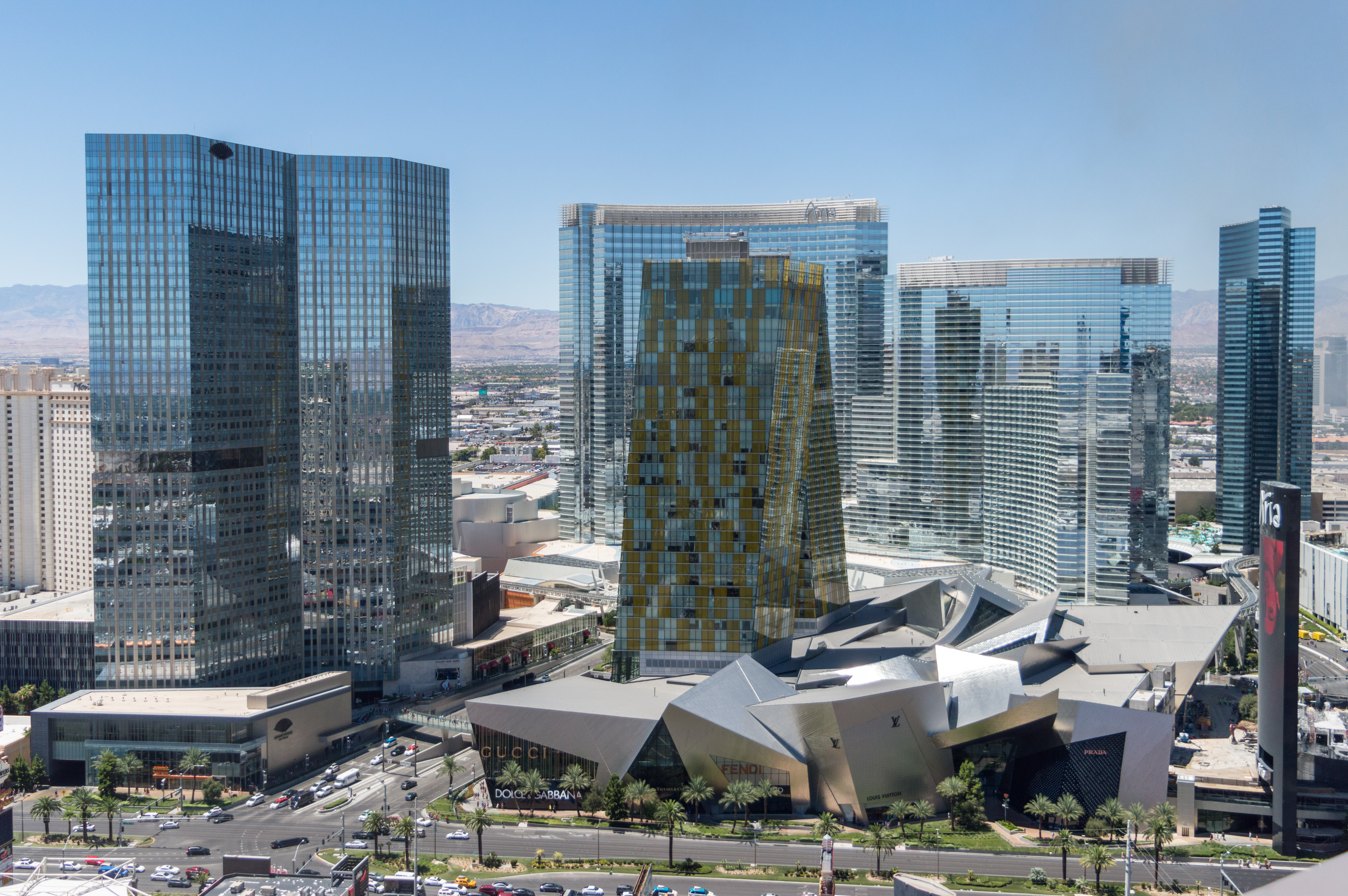
CityCenter

The home mortgage crisis (2007-2010) and the late 2000s recession affected the Las Vegas economy. New home construction was stalled, and other projects were canceled, postponed, or continued with financial troubles. The global financial situation also had a negative effect on gambling and tourism revenue, causing many of the companies to report net loss. Casinos on the northern Strip would be impacted by reduced foot traffic in the area, as several projects sat unfinished.

Postponed projects throughout Las Vegas included Downtown Summerlin and Echelon Place, the latter a mixed-use project on the Strip. Another postponed resort project was the Fontainebleau, also on the Strip; its 67-story hotel tower has been the tallest building in the state since being topped off in 2008.

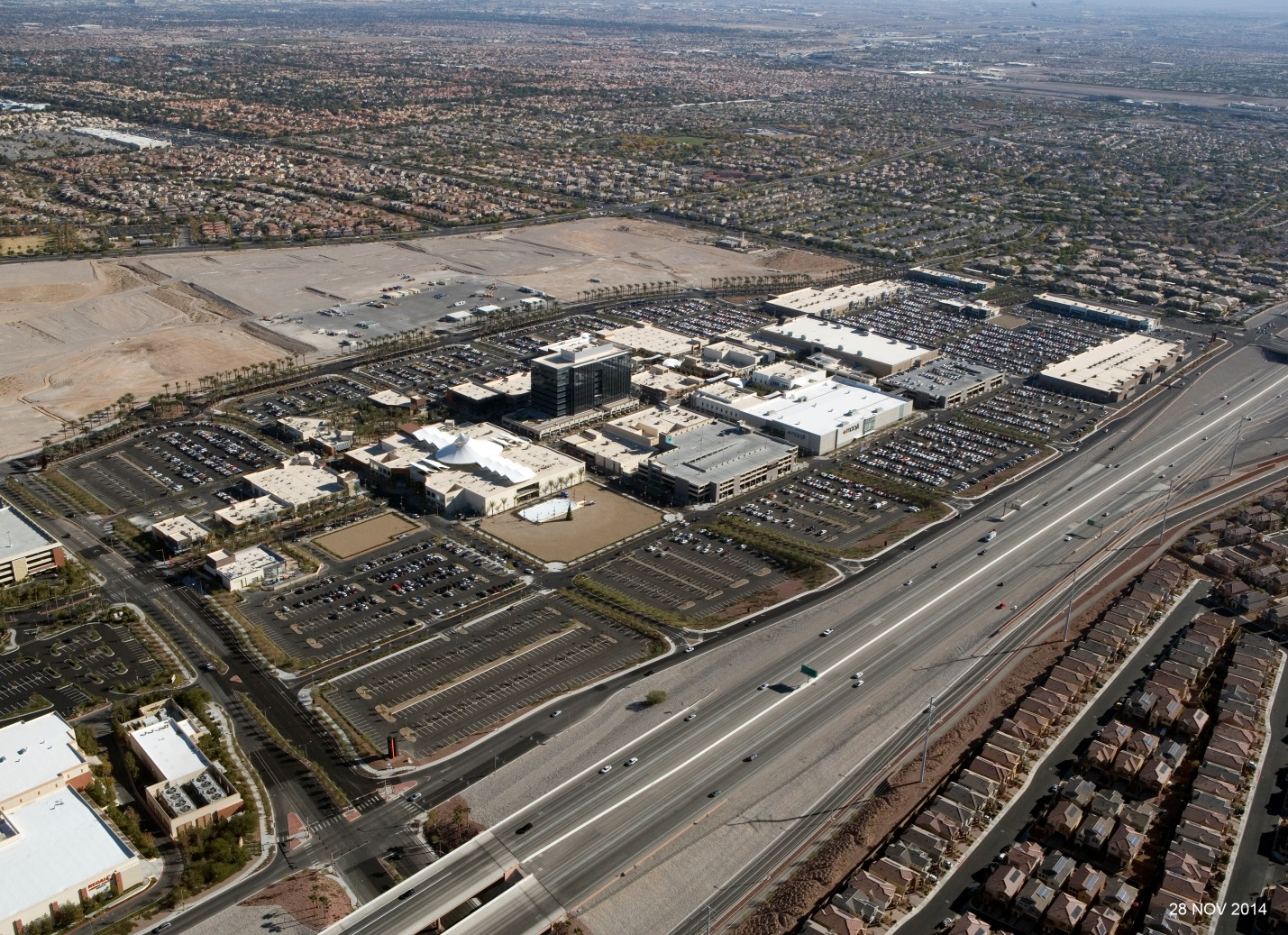
Overlooking Downtown Summerlin in 2015

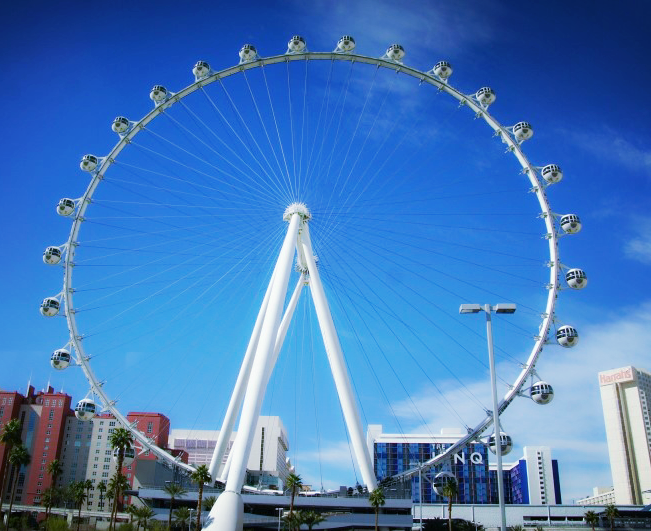
The High Roller

Several new resorts on the Strip were already under construction and continued despite the economic slowdown. The Palazzo opened in 2007, followed by Encore Las Vegas a year later. CityCenter, an $8.5 billion mixed-use project, opened on 67 acres (27 ha) in 2009. The Cosmopolitan debuted in 2010, as the last new Strip resort to be built for the next decade. Implosions of older resorts ended due to the recession, with renovations now favored as opposed to all-new development.

Economic conditions, especially in the housing market, had improved by 2012. Downtown Summerlin eventually opened in 2014, while the Strip debuted the world's tallest Ferris wheel. Known as the High Roller, it stands 550 ft (170 m). Topgolf opened a location near the Strip in 2016, and its success prompted the addition of other golf attractions in the area. Las Vegas gained further popularity among tourists with the arrival of professional sports in the late 2010s. The high-rise condominium market had also improved by this time.

== 2017–2025: tragedies, pandemic, renewal, "Trump Slump" ==
During the late evening of October 1, 2017, Las Vegas became the scene of the deadliest mass shooting committed by a single gunman in the history of the United States. Gunman Stephen Paddock opened fire on Route 91 Harvest festival-goers from the Mandalay Bay resort, killing 60 and injuring 867.

The Alpine Motel Apartments fire occurred in downtown Las Vegas in December 2019, killing six people. It is the deadliest fire to occur in city limits. As a result, the city mandated additional inspections for older motel structures that, like the Alpine, had been converted into apartments.

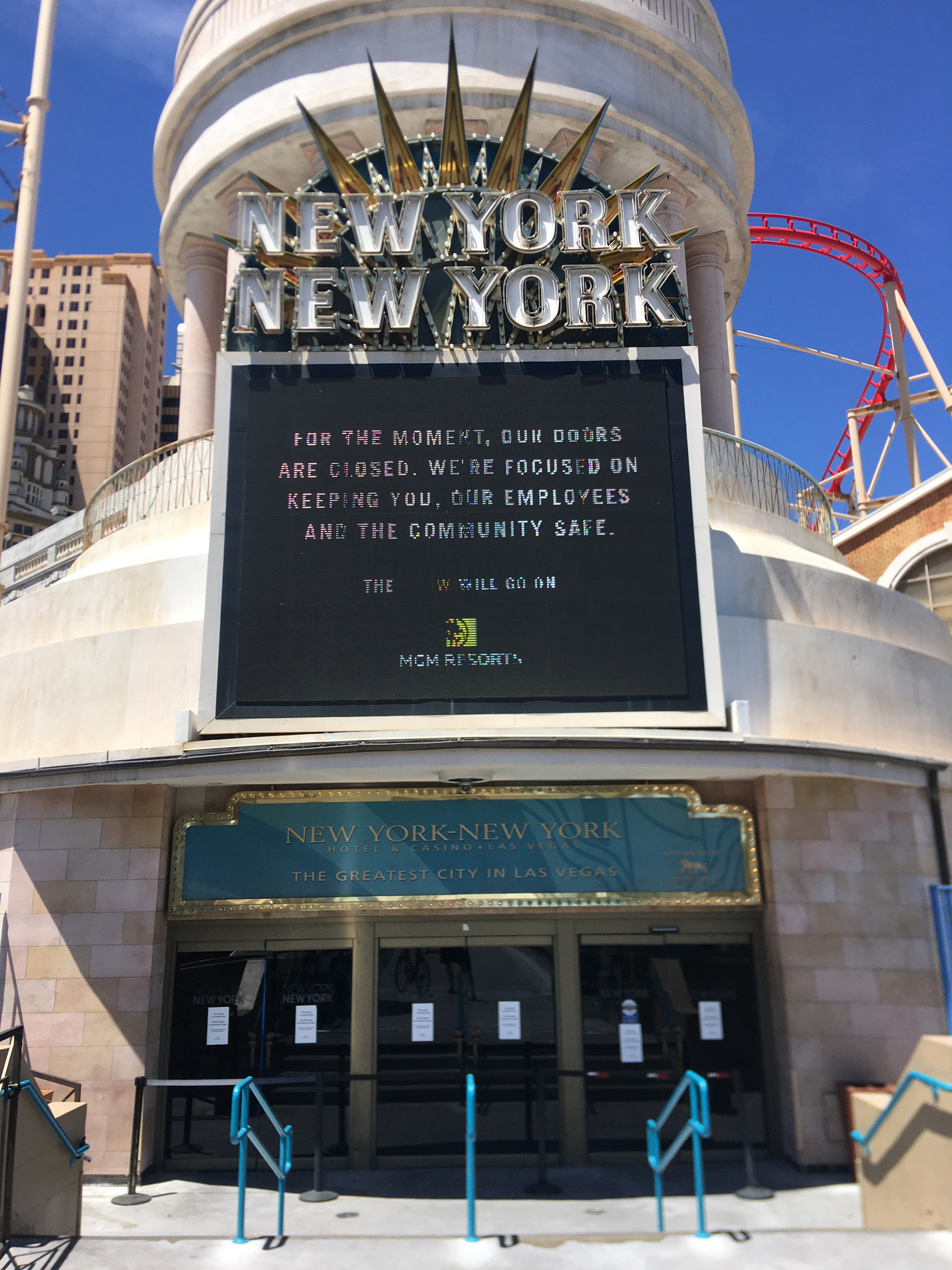
During the early stages of the COVID-19 pandemic, casinos were ordered to close, nearly unheard of in Las Vegas.

The COVID-19 pandemic reached Las Vegas in March 2020, having various effects and a negative impact on the area's economy. To minimize the spread of the virus, Nevada governor Steve Sisolak ordered the closure of various businesses across the state, including casinos. For the Strip, COVID-19 marked the first widespread closure of casinos since the state funeral of John F. Kennedy in 1963. Mayor Goodman was critical of the business closures, noting that Las Vegas is dependent on tourism. Casinos were allowed to reopen after 78 days, joining other businesses to resume operations. The Las Vegas tourism industry lost an estimated $34 billion during 2020, and the area had the highest unemployment rate in the country going into 2021.

Several resorts debuted during the pandemic, including Circa, the first new downtown property to be built since 1980. It opened in late 2020, and would be followed by Resorts World Las Vegas in 2021. Constructed at a cost of $4.3 billion, Resorts World is the most expensive Las Vegas resort ever. It was built on the planned site of Echelon Place, and incorporated several of its unfinished structures. Fontainebleau opened in 2023, more than 18 years after it was announced. Durango, Station's first new property in 15 years, also opened in 2023, in the southwest Las Vegas Valley.

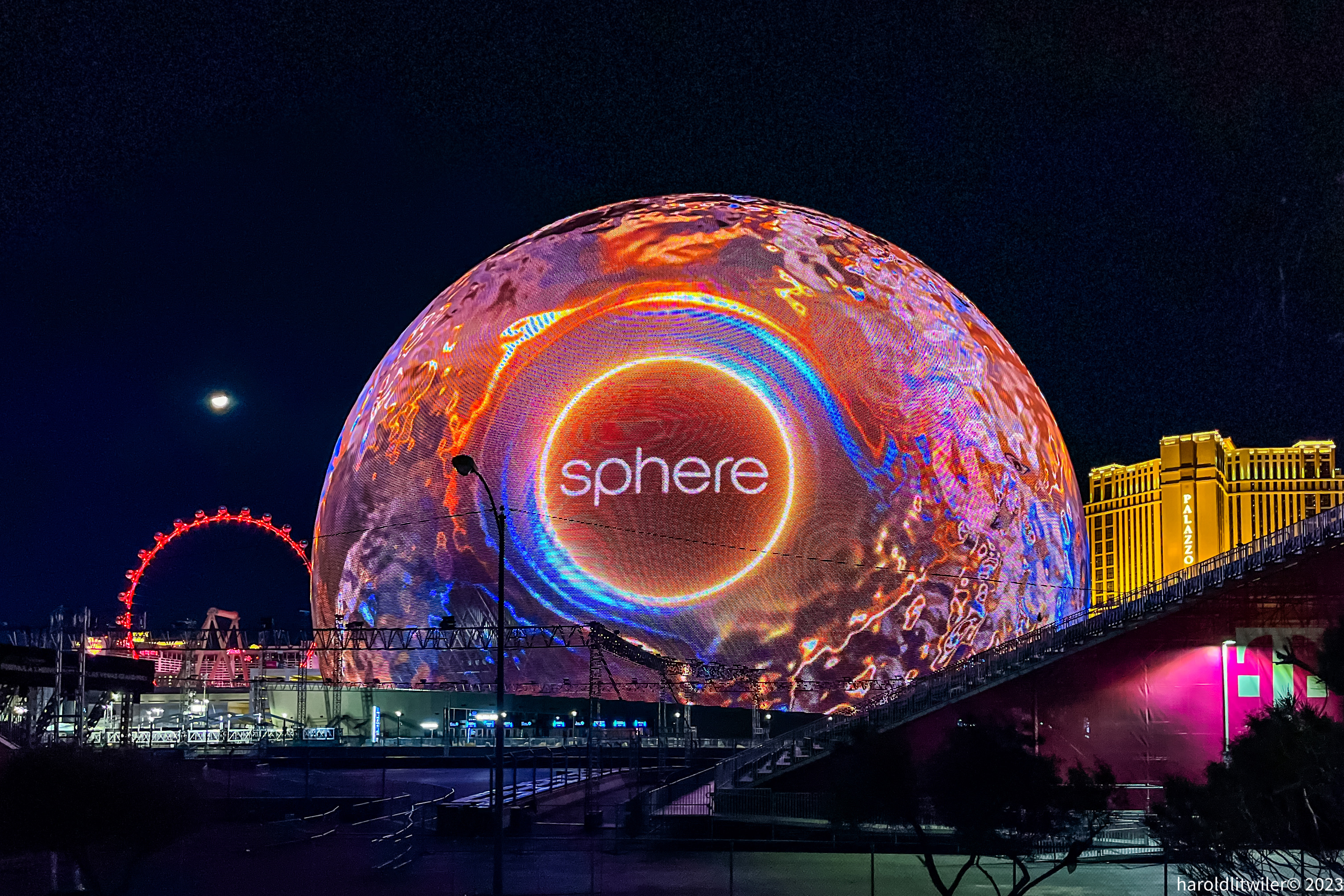
Sphere, an entertainment venue near the Strip

Aside from resorts, other projects have also opened since the pandemic. Area15, an experiential facility that leases space to a variety of tenants, debuted in 2020. A year later, the Las Vegas Convention Center completed its West Hall, an expansion costing nearly $1 billion. An underground car shuttle, the Las Vegas Convention Center Loop, was also opened. Sphere, a globe-shaped venue with an exterior LED screen, opened in 2023, and has hosted various shows and entertainers.

The former Hard Rock Hotel was renovated and reopened as Virgin Hotels Las Vegas in 2021, with its casino managed by the Mohegan Tribe, making it the first Native American casino operator in Las Vegas. Later that year, the San Manuel Band of Mission Indians became the first Native casino owner in Las Vegas with its acquisition of the Palms, located west of the Strip. Hard Rock International, owned by the Seminole Tribe of Florida, became the first Native operator of a Strip casino in 2022, when it took over the Mirage. The resort closed in 2024, after 34 years, to undergo renovations and rebranding as a new Hard Rock resort. After 67 years, the Tropicana was also closed and demolished in 2024, partly to make way for a baseball stadium associated with the Athletics. The Tropicana's demolition marked the first implosion of a Las Vegas resort since the Riviera in 2016.

For decades, there had been proposals to build a high-speed train connecting Las Vegas with California. Among these was the California–Nevada Interstate Maglev in the 2000s. A high-speed rail route, known as Brightline West, eventually began construction in 2024, and is expected to go into service in 2028.

Shelley Berkley was elected mayor in the 2024 election, ending a combined 25-year tenure for the Goodmans.

An explosion occurred on January 1, 2025, outside the main entrance of the Trump International Hotel Las Vegas near the Strip. A Tesla Cybertruck was the source; it contained firework mortars and gas canisters, which fueled the explosion. The vehicle's sole occupant died from a self-inflicted gunshot wound to the head just before the explosion and seven bystanders were injured by the blast. The driver and alleged perpetrator was identified as Matthew Alan Livelsberger, an American-born, active-duty United States Army Special Forces soldier from Colorado Springs, who was on leave from overseas duty. Livelsberger wrote two letters, recovered by the FBI from his burnt phone, in which he denied being a terrorist but admitted using explosives to convey a political message and ease his mental burdens.

A reduction of international visitors to the U.S. during 2025 precipitated an economic downturn in the Las Vegas, with local officials citing a "Trump Slump" resulting from the Trump administration’s tariffs and immigration policies and practices as responsible for the downswing, with tourism from Canada and Mexico in steepest decline. AAA's annual top ten list of Labor Day destinations re-assigned Las Vegas, from sixth in 2024 to 10th in 2025. Las Vegas Strip casino profits were receded in 2025—net income was reported to have taken a sharp downturn from 2024, by 81.2%, in 2025, while downtown casinos experienced a 20.2% decline, posting a slightly higher net income than casinos on The Strip in 2025.

== 2026−present ==
Waymo fully autonomous self-driving vehicles began testing on Greater Las Vegas roadways in July 2026, with plans to open the service to the public later that year.

== Popular culture ==
Las Vegas, especially the Strip, has been a popular location for film production. Early examples include The Las Vegas Story (1952), Meet Me in Las Vegas (1956), Ocean's 11 (1960), and Viva Las Vegas (1964). Other prominent films in later years included Casino (1995), the Ocean's Eleven remake (2001), and The Hangover (2009).

Television series have also been set in the city, including Vegas (1978–1981), CSI: Crime Scene Investigation (2000–2015), and Las Vegas (2003–2008). Reality television became more popular in the 2000s, leading to locally based programs such as Pawn Stars (2009–present). Various video games have also been set in the area, including Tom Clancy's Rainbow Six: Vegas (2006), Fallout: New Vegas (2010), and several installments in the CSI series.

American author and journalist Hunter S. Thompson's seminal work, Fear and Loathing in Las Vegas: A Savage Journey to the Heart of the American Dream, was published in 1971, as a two-part serial in the magazine Rolling Stone. The roman à clef, which details Thompson's trip to Las Vegas, was then published as a full-length novel by Random House. The book was made into a film, Fear and Loathing in Las Vegas, and released in 1998. By that time, Las Vegas had accounted for 80-percent of all filming done in the state. Within a few years, efforts were ramped up to further promote Las Vegas as a filming location.

The 2025 Oscar-winning film Anora was shot in Las Vegas in 2023, including at the Palms Casino and the Fremont Street Experience, with its wedding scene filmed at the A Little White Wedding Chapel.

=== Film studios ===
In addition to on-location work, several small film studios were also established during the 1990s for sound stage production. TVM Studios was formed by filmmaker Ted V. Mikels in 1993, and operated until 2009. The Las Vegas Video & Sound Film Production Center was established in 1995, with 15,000 sq ft (1,400 m^{2}) of space. Located in southwest Las Vegas, it was Nevada's first major sound stage, and was used as a location for films such as Con Air and Vegas Vacation. Big Picture Studios opened in 1997, and included a 1,500 sq ft (140 m^{2}) sound stage.

In 1997, producer Doris Keating proposed Black Mountain Studios, to be built on 85 acres (34 ha) in Henderson. She intended for it to capture a portion of Hollywood's runaway production work. The project was delayed several times. Nearby residents opposed the studio, believing it would disrupt the area's rural surroundings, and the city council eventually voted against it. Although Keating planned to find a new location within Las Vegas, the project was ultimately scrapped. Another production facility was proposed for West Las Vegas in 2003, but this would also be canceled.

In 2024, Sony Pictures proposed a $1.8 billion film studio to be built in Summerlin, on land owned by the Howard Hughes Corporation. Later that year, Warner Bros. announced plans for its own, larger Las Vegas film studio, to be built at a cost of $8.5 billion. Both projects are contingent on the passage of rival bills in the 2025 Nevada Legislature that would increase the state's film tax credits.

== Sports ==
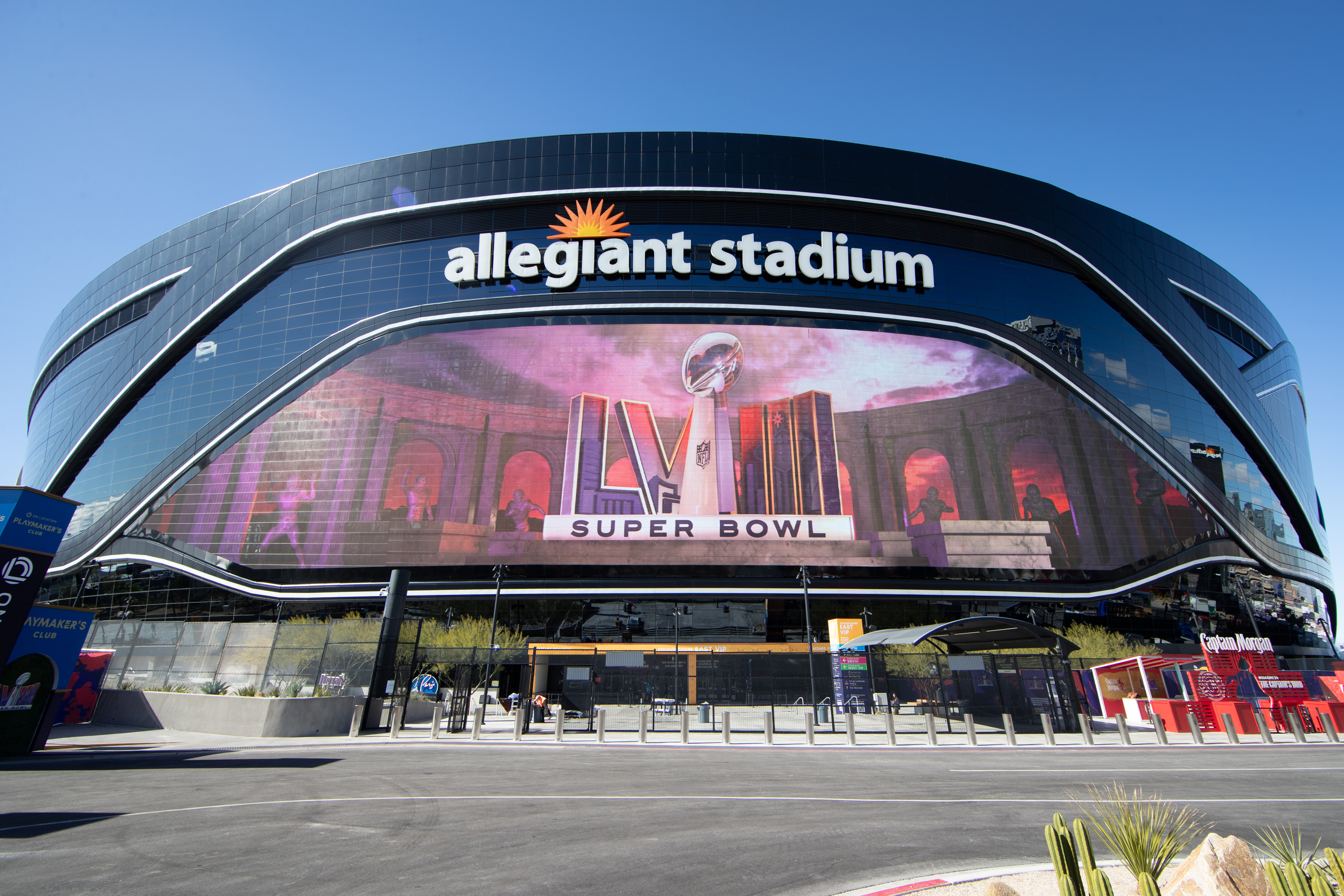
Allegiant Stadium during Super Bowl LVIII

The Las Vegas Valley has been host to numerous sports. Boxing, for example, dates to the 1950s, and would become a staple for the area. Early sports venues included Sam Boyd Stadium; completed in 1971, it hosted football and soccer games. This would be followed in 1983, by the Thomas & Mack Center and Cashman Field. The MGM Grand Garden Arena opened in 1993.

The Las Vegas Valley eventually became host to several professional sports teams. T-Mobile Arena opened in 2016, and became home to the Vegas Golden Knights the following year, with the team winning its first Stanley Cup in 2023. In 2018 Las Vegas became home to a USL expansion team, Las Vegas Lights FC who currently play at Cashman Field

The Las Vegas Aces, a WNBA team, started playing at the Michelob Ultra Arena in 2018. The Las Vegas Raiders, an NFL team, began playing at the newly built Allegiant Stadium in 2020, after relocating from Oakland. The three venues are located on or near the Strip. Super Bowl LVIII was held at Allegiant Stadium in 2024, marking the first time that Las Vegas had hosted the annual event.

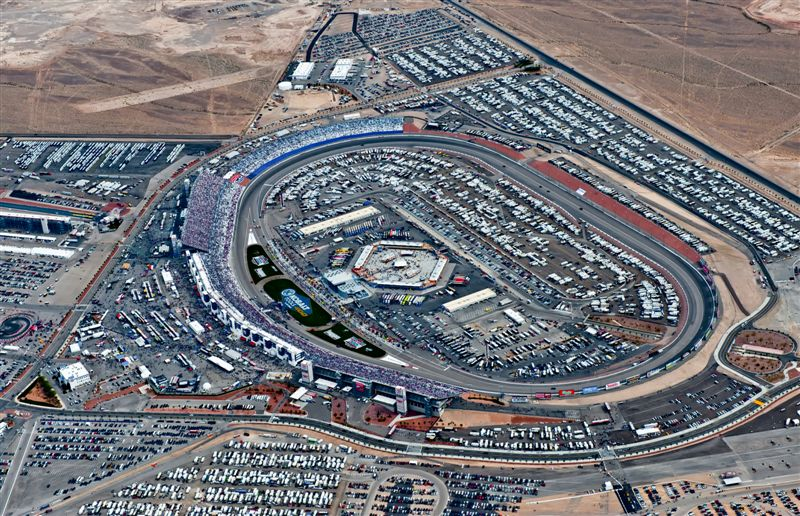
The Las Vegas Motor Speedway

Las Vegas also has a history with baseball. The Las Vegas Aviators, a Minor League team, were established in 1983. The team was originally known as the Las Vegas Stars (1983–2000) and later the Las Vegas 51s (2001–2018). The Las Vegas Ballpark opened in Summerlin in 2019, as a new venue for the Aviators, who previously played at Cashman Field. The Athletics, a Major League Baseball team, confirmed plans in 2023 to relocate from Oakland. The team's new stadium would be located on the Strip, and is scheduled to begin construction in 2025, with completion expected three years later.

Various racing events have been held in Las Vegas, including the Mint 400 which began in the 1960s, and the Caesars Palace Grand Prix held during the 1980s. The Las Vegas Motor Speedway opened in 1996, bringing NASCAR races to the area. Formula One debuted its annual Las Vegas Grand Prix in 2023, with a race track that travels on and near the Strip.

== Weather and climate change ==
In the wake of a 2002 drought, climate change in Nevada garnered attention. Subsequently, daily water consumption in Las Vegas was reduced from 314 gallons per resident in 2003 to around 205 gallons in 2015. Despite these conservation efforts, local water consumption remains 30 percent more than in Los Angeles, and over three times that of San Francisco. In June 2017, a heat wave grounded more than 40 airline flights of small aircraft, with American Airlines reducing sales on certain flights and Las Vegas tying its previous record high temperature at 117 degrees Fahrenheit. Las Vegas reached a new record high temperature of 120 °F on July 7, 2024.

Tornadoes and snowfall are rare in the Las Vegas Valley, although the area is prone to flash flooding. The Clark County Regional Flood Control District was formed in 1985 and eventually began work on a flood control network. Two people were killed and more than $20 million in damage occurred during a 1999 flood, the most destructive in Las Vegas history. Its effects were mitigated by the flood control network, which was 20-percent finished at the time, and has continued to grow.

== See also ==
- Timeline of Las Vegas
- Concert residency
- Demographics of Las Vegas
- Welcome to Fabulous Las Vegas sign
- Misconduct in the Las Vegas Metropolitan Police Department
