= Climate change in Nevada =

Climate change in the US state of Nevada

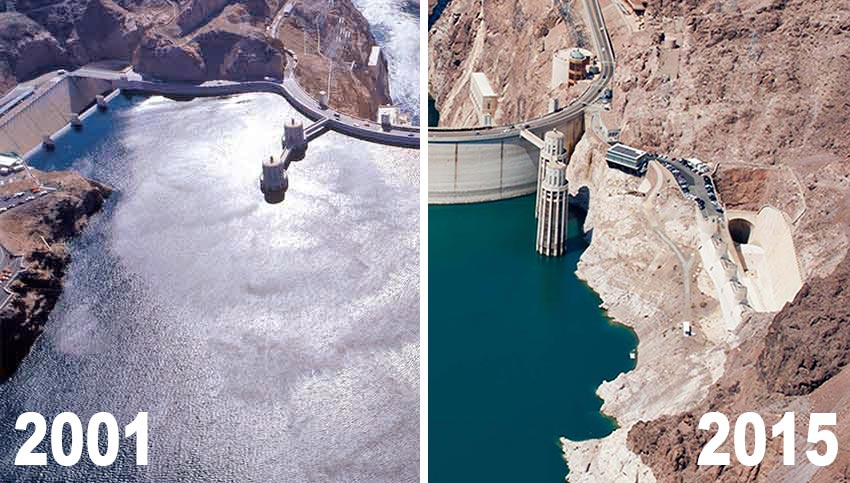
Drought drying up Lake Mead, shown in 2001 and 2015

Climate change in Nevada has been measured over the last century, with the average temperature in Elko, Nevada increasing by 0.6 °F (0.33 °C), and precipitation increasing by up to 20% in many parts of the state. These past trends may or may not continue into the future.

== Potential changes ==
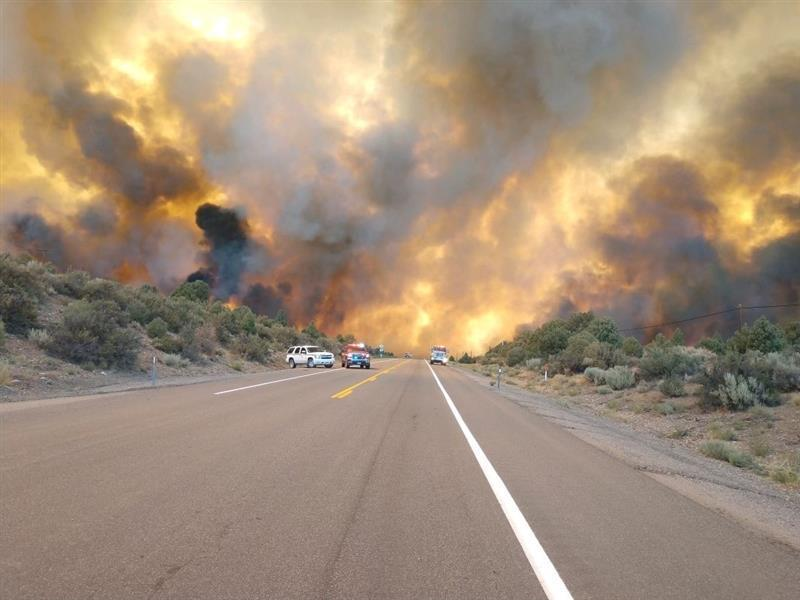
Tamarack Fire, 2021

Over the course of the 21st century, experts suggest that climate in Nevada may change even more. Based on projections made by the Intergovernmental Panel on Climate Change and results from the Hadley Centre for Climate Prediction and Research climate model (HadCM2), a model that accounts for both greenhouse gases and aerosols, by 2100, temperatures in Nevada could increase by 3-4 °F (1.7-2.2 °C) in spring and fall (with a range of 1-6 °F [0.5-3.3 °C]), and by 5-6 °F (2.8-3.3 °C) in winter and summer (with a range of 2-10 °F [1.1-5.6 °C]). Precipitation is estimated to decrease in summer by 10% (with a range of -5% to -20%), to increase by 15% in spring, to increase by about 30% in fall, and to increase by about 40% in winter. Other climate models may show different results, especially regarding estimated changes in precipitation. The effects described in the sections that follow take into account estimates from different models. The amount of precipitation received on extremely wet or snowy days in winter is likely to increase. The frequency of extremely hot days in summer would increase. It is not clear how the severity of storms might be affected, although an increase in the frequency and intensity of winter storms is possible.

=== Water resources ===
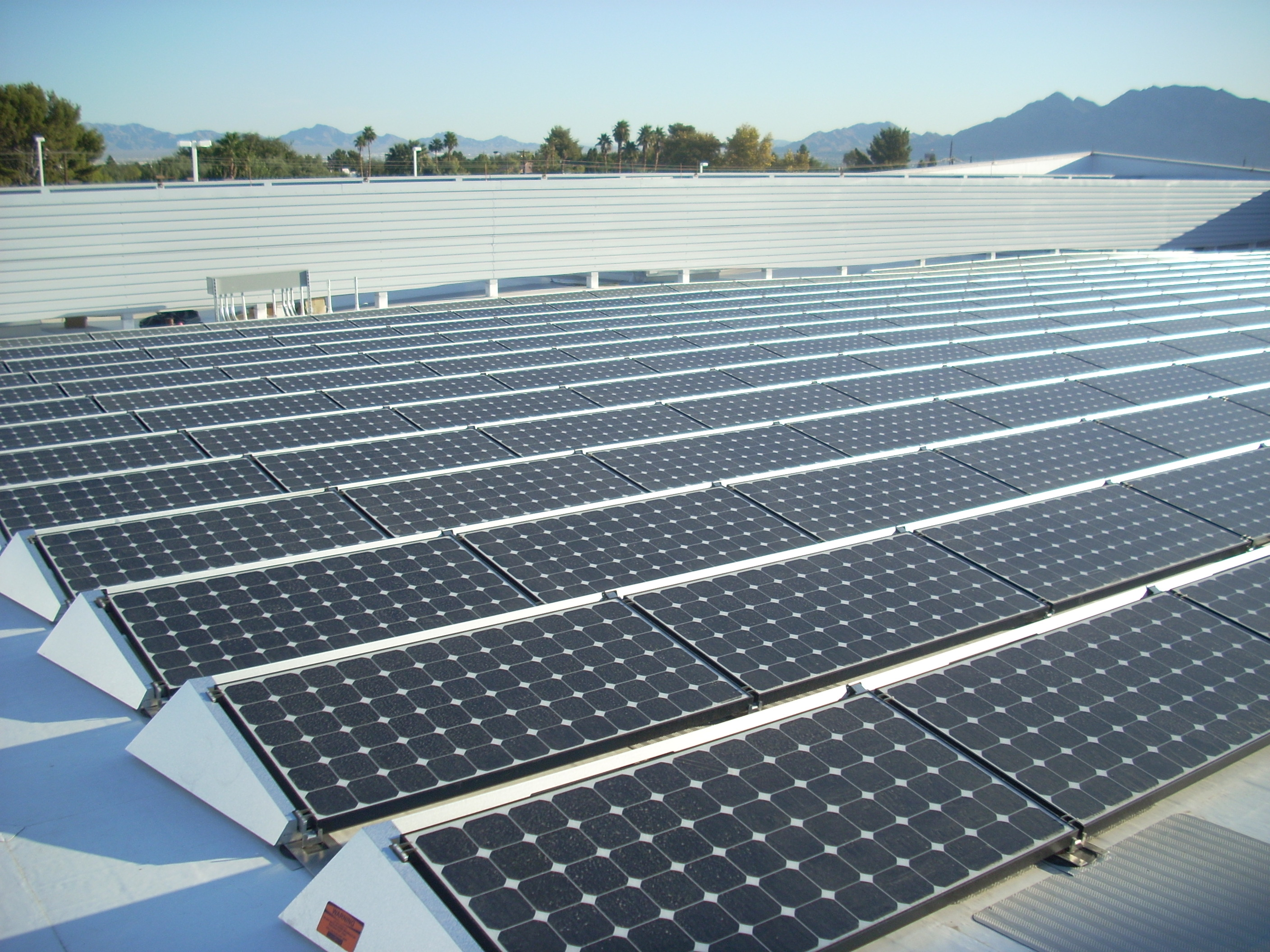
Solar installation, Las Vegas

The sustained streamflow in Nevada largely results from spring and summer snowmelt in the mountains.

Earlier and more rapid snowmelts could contribute to winter and spring flooding, and more intense summer storms could increase the likelihood of flash floods. Although Nevada is extremely dry, intense rains can produce torrents of water and debris. Residential and industrial developments on valley floors and near the foothills are especially vulnerable during flash floods.

==== Las Vegas water supply ====
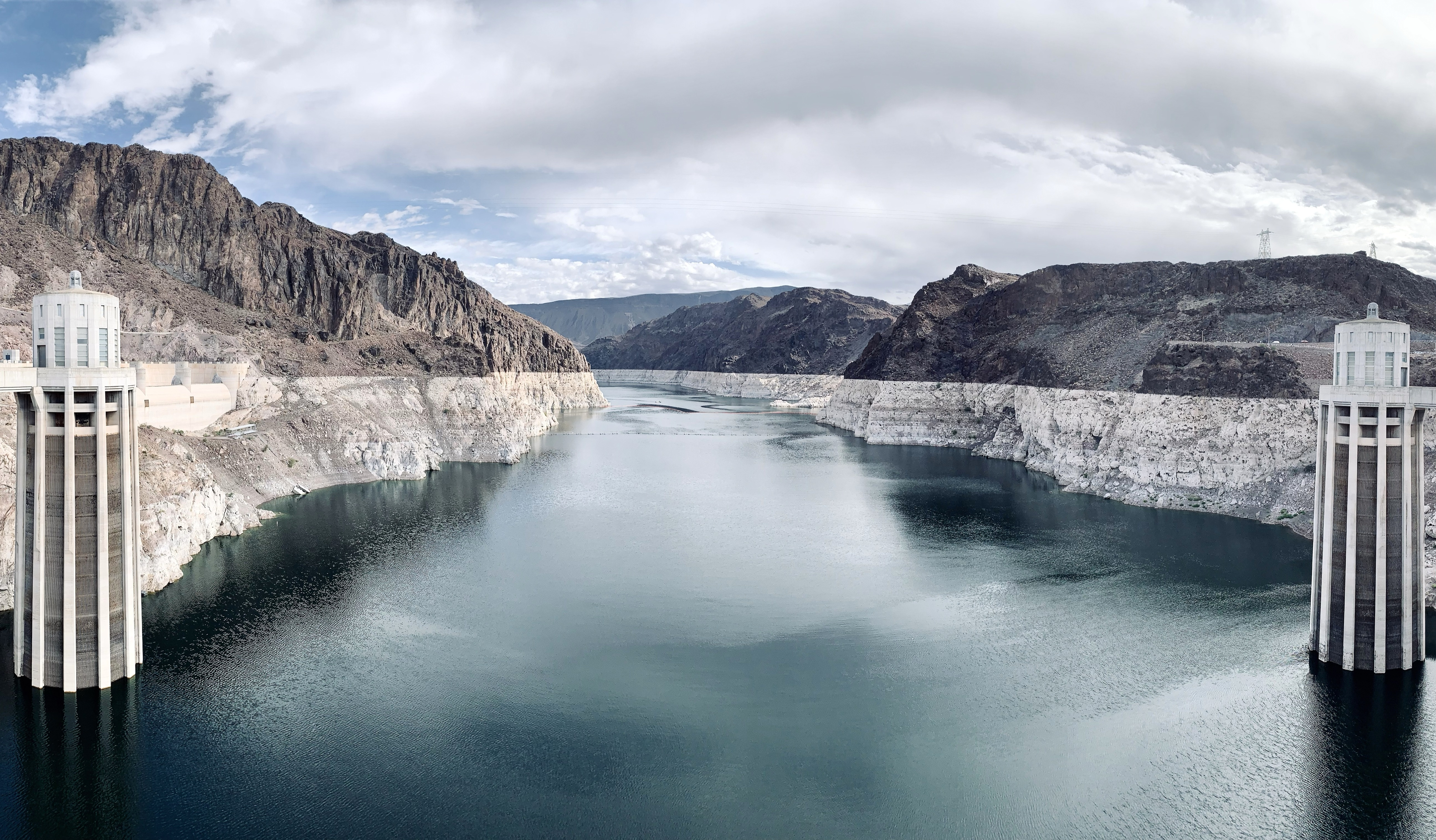
The "bath ring" of Lake Mead shows lowered water level

Due to concerns about climate change in the wake of a 2002 drought, daily water consumption in Las Vegas has been reduced from 314 gallons per resident in 2003 to around 205 gallons. Despite these conservation efforts, local water consumption remains 30 percent more than in Los Angeles, and over three times that of San Francisco metropolitan area residents. The Southern Nevada Water Authority is building a $1.4 billion tunnel and pumping station to bring water from Lake Mead, which "would allow the city to continue taking water even after the generators and pumps in the Hoover Dam stop operating and California, Arizona and Mexico, which is also entitled to the tail end of the Colorado’s water, are completely cut off."

=== Agriculture ===
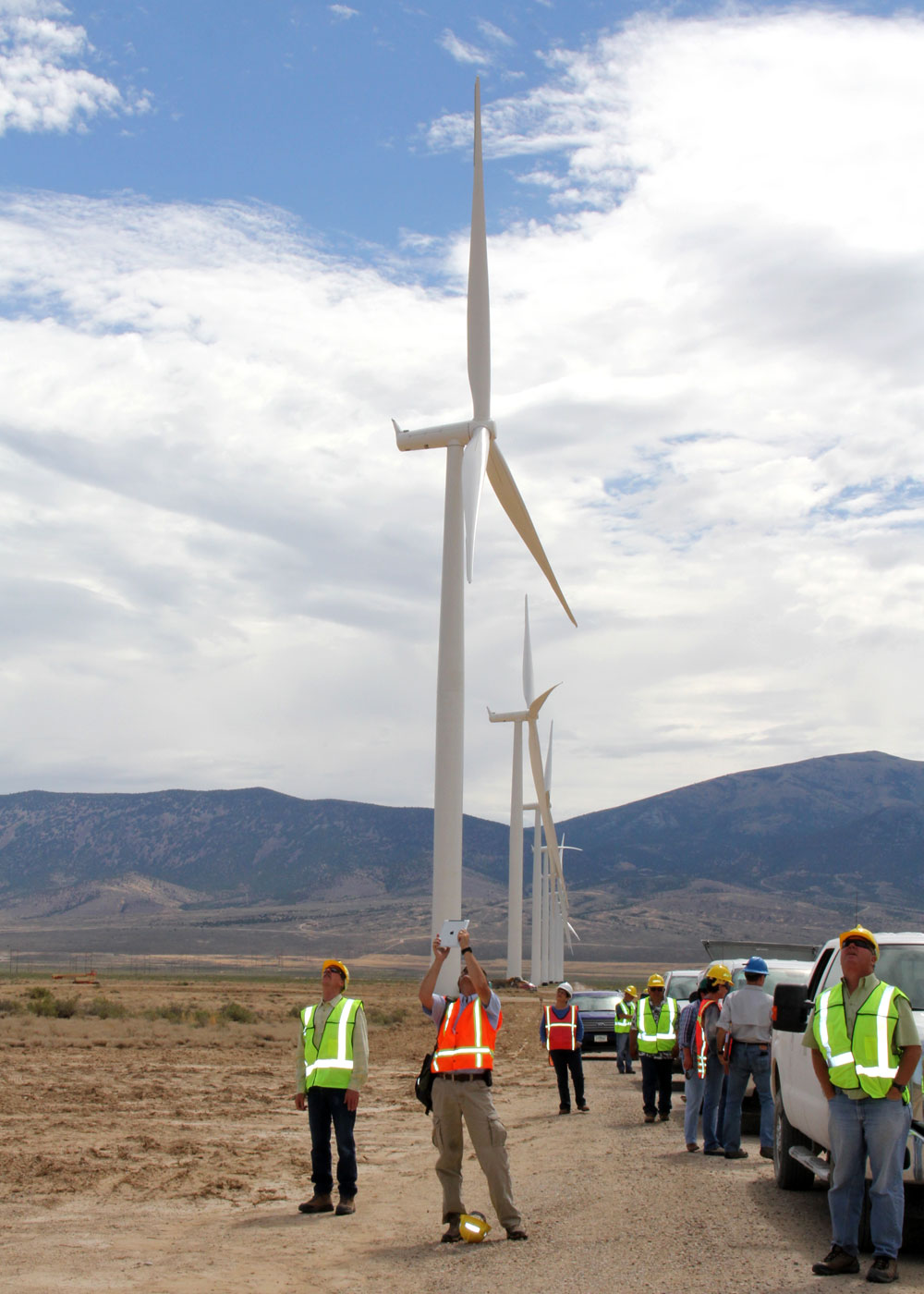
Wind turbine construction, Ely

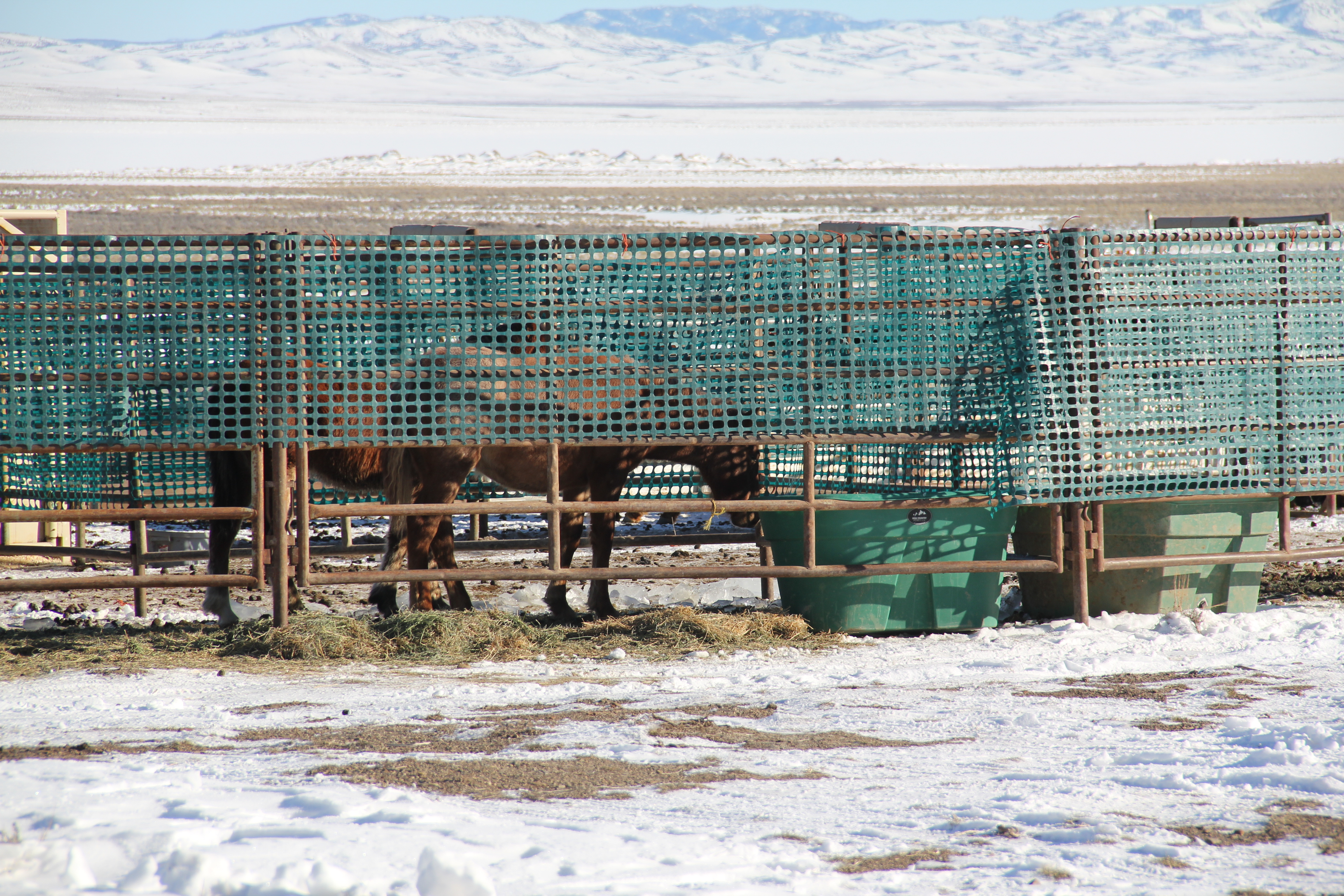
Temporary shelter for horses during drought

In Nevada, production agriculture is a $300 million annual industry, two-thirds of which comes from livestock, mainly cattle. Almost all of the farmed acres are irrigated. The major crops are hay and potatoes. Climate change could affect crop production, reducing potato yields by about 12%, with hay and pasture yields increasing by about 7%. Farmed acres could rise by 9% or fall by 9%, depending on how climate changes. Livestock production may not be affected, unless summer temperatures rise significantly and conditions become significantly drier. Under these conditions, livestock tend to gain less weight and pasture yields decline, limiting forage.

=== Forests ===
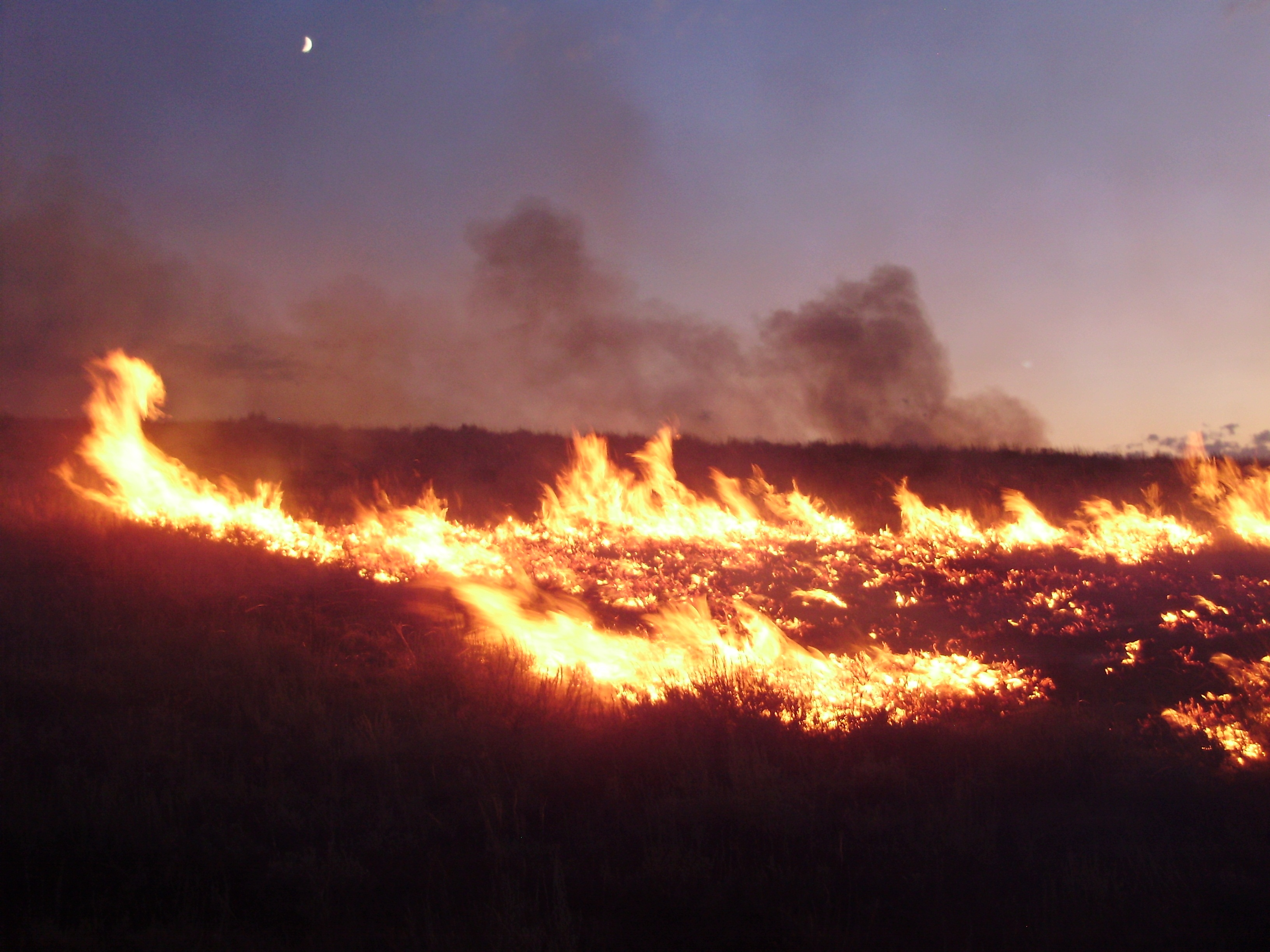
Susie Fire, west of Elko

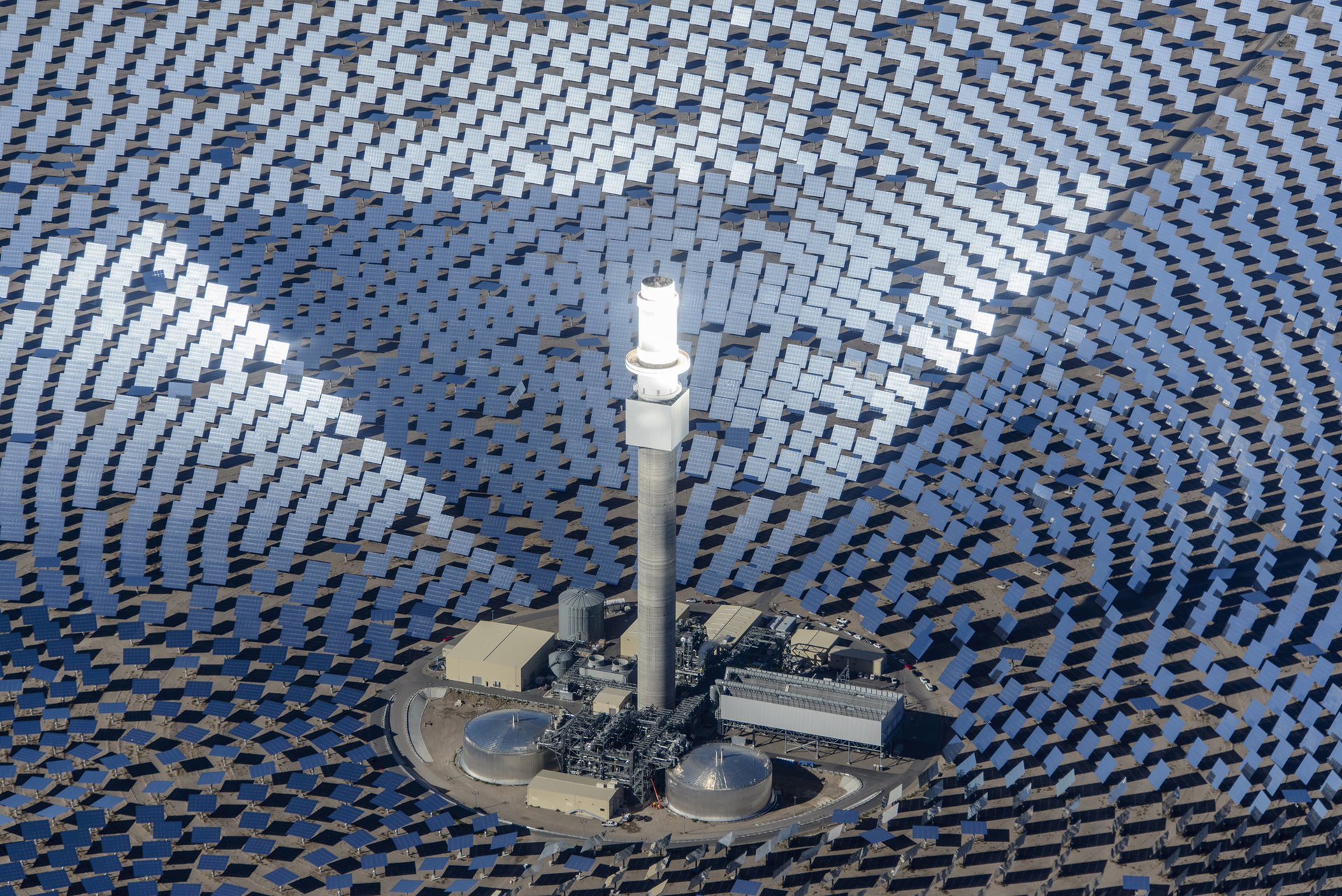
Crescent Dunes Solar Energy Project, Tonopah

With changes in climate, the extent of forested areas in Nevada could change little or decline by as much as 15-30%. The uncertainties depend on many factors, including whether soils become drier and, if so, how much drier. Hotter, drier weather could increase the frequency and intensity of wildfires, threatening both property and forests. Drier conditions would reduce the range and health of ponderosa and lodgepole pine forests in the northern and western areas of the state, and increase their susceptibility to fire. Grasslands, rangeland, and desert could expand into previously forested areas. Milder winters could increase the likelihood of insect outbreaks and of subsequent wildfires in the dead fuel left after such an outbreak. These changes would significantly affect the character of Nevada forests and the activities that depend on them. Increased rainfall could reduce the severity of these effects.

=== Ecosystems ===
The region's inherently variable and unpredictable hydrological and climatic systems could become even more variable with changes in climate, putting stress on wetland ecosystems. The streams and rivers in Nevada are entirely spring-fed or derived from runoff from the mountains. A warmer climate would increase evaporation and shorten the snow season in the mountains, resulting in earlier spring runoff and reduced summer streamflow. This would exacerbate fire risk in the late summer. These threats, coupled with increasing human demands on water resources, could severely reduce the number and quality of wetland habitats, which are already stressed and ephemeral. This would degrade habitat essential for migrating and breeding birds, and could further stress rare and endangered fish species. Many desert-adapted plants and animals already live near their tolerance limits, and could disappear under the hotter conditions predicted under global warming.

== See also ==
- Sierra Club
- Sierra Nevada Alliance
- Plug-in electric vehicles in Nevada
