= Sierra Nevada Conservancy =

Californian Conservancy

- Formation: 2005
- Founded: 2004; 22 years ago
- Region served: Sierra Nevada
- Method: Conservation
- Website: sierranevada.ca.gov

The Sierra Nevada Conservancy is the largest conservancy in the U.S. state of California, and the largest state conservation effort of its kind in the nation.

The California state agency is one of ten state conservancies within the California Natural Resources Agency. The conservancy awards grants to government entities, non-profit organizations, and tribal organizations for economic, recreation, and resource preservation in the greater Sierra Nevada region. In addition, it offers educational symposiums.

The 25 million acres within this Conservancy are a gift to the people of California... AB 2600 is common sense legislation to preserve and protect our environment and allow everyone to enjoy our Sierra Nevada Mountains for years to come.

— Governor Schwarzenegger, August 22, 2004

The Sierra Nevada Conservancy was established by Assembly Bill 2600 in 2004, effective January 1, 2005, and was supported by the Sierra Nevada Alliance. Its creation was spearheaded by Governor Arnold Schwarzenegger, and co-sponsored by assemblymembers Tim Leslie and John Laird. In 2006, voters passed Proposition 84, with some of the funding appropriated to the Sierra Nevada Conservancy for safe water supply and quality, flood control, park improvements and natural resource protection. Later voter initiatives, Proposition 1 and Proposition 68, provided additional funding for various conservation efforts.

The conservancy's jurisdiction originally covered approximately 25,000,000 acres (101,171.41 km^{2}; 39,062.50 sq mi) in the counties of Alpine, Amador, Butte, Calaveras, El Dorado, Fresno, Inyo, Kern, Lassen, Madera, Mariposa, Modoc, Mono, Nevada, Placer, Plumas, Shasta, Sierra, Tehama, Tulare, Tuolumne, and Yuba. Including 3500 plant species, and 720 animal species, it supports half of California's plants, half of the state's reptile and amphibian species, and two-thirds of the state's bird and mammal species. SB 208, chaptered in 2021, expanded the geographical territory within the conservancy's service area to approximately 27,000,000 acres. As of January 1, 2022, the service area is composed of the mountains and foothills of the Sierra Nevada mountain range, the Mono Basin, Owens Valley, the Modoc Plateau, and parts of the southern Cascade mountain range and the Klamath Mountains.

The conservancy has offices in Auburn, Bishop, Mariposa, and Susanville. It is governed by a 13-member board, and there are three non-voting liaison advisers. In November 2005, Jim Branham was appointed as the organization's first Executive Officer.
