= Plug-in electric vehicles in Nevada =

As of December 2021, there were about 17,000 electric vehicles in Nevada, accounting for 0.7% of vehicles in the state. Electric vehicles account for about 4.6% of all vehicle sales in the state.

== Charging stations ==
In 2021, the Nevada Public Utilities Commission allocated US$100 million to electric vehicle infrastructure.

The Infrastructure Investment and Jobs Act, signed into law in November 2021, allocates US$5.6 million to electric vehicle charging stations in Nevada.

== Manufacturing ==
Nevada has been proposed as an electric vehicle manufacturing hub, due to its large reserves of lithium, a key component of electric vehicle batteries.

== Public opinion ==
A poll conducted by Coltura in 2021 showed 52% of voters in Nevada supporting the state fully transitioning to electric cars by 2030.

== By region ==
=== Las Vegas ===
As of 2021, there are about 6,000 AC charging stations and 40 DC charging stations in the Las Vegas Valley.
