= Helldorado Days (Las Vegas) =

Rodeo, parade and festival in Nevada

Helldorado is an event in Las Vegas, Nevada, celebrating the city's historical roots. It started as a fundraiser in 1935 and became an annual celebration of the City's birth. In various forms and under different names, the festival continues to the present time.

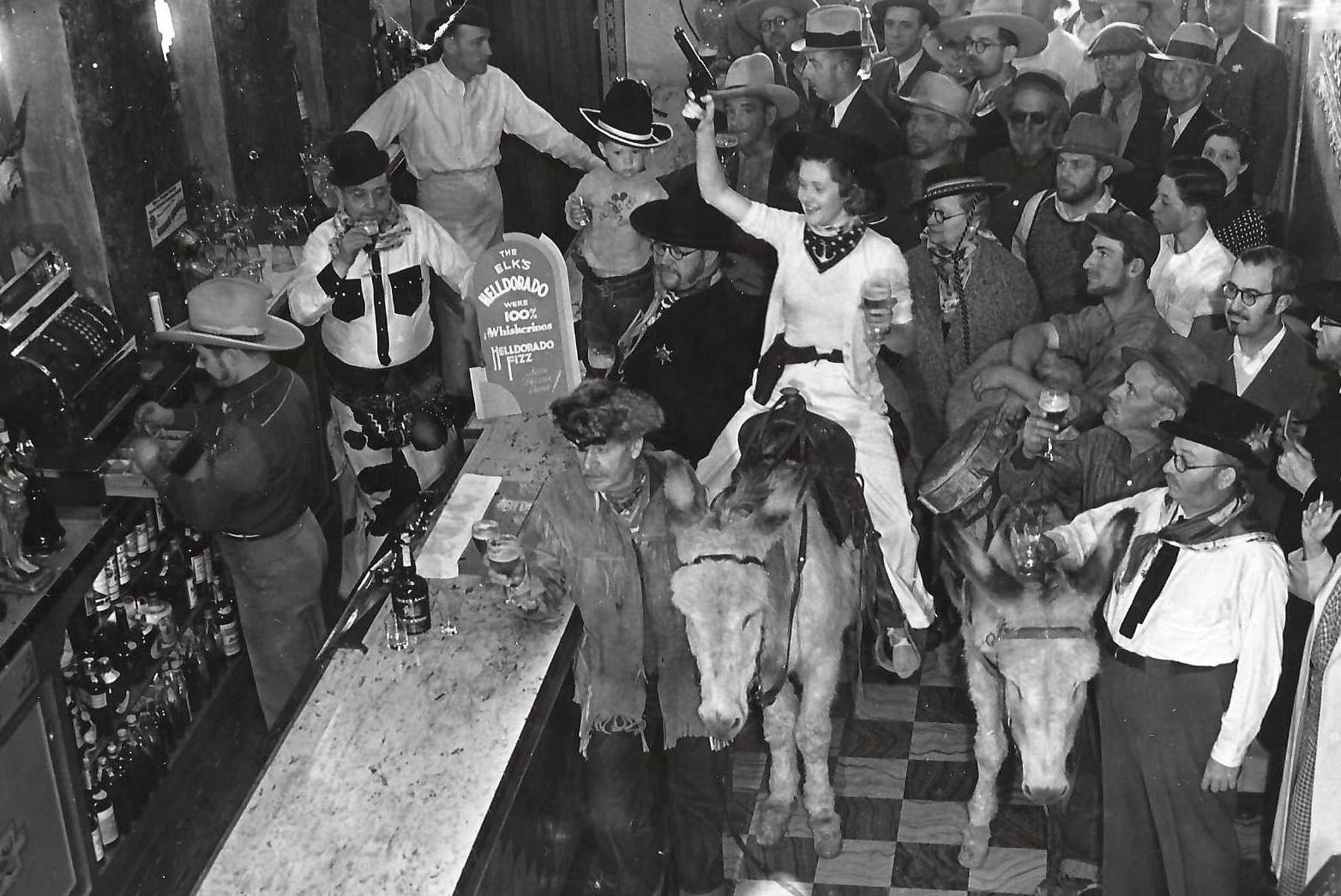
“Louis Dufur, Pretty Las Vegas, Nev. Debutante, “Sets ‘Em Up” for her Friends” at “saloon in downtown Las Vegas.” The photograph is part of a series sent out by the Union Pacific Railroad’s publicly department to promote the event.

== History ==
=== 1935 History inaugural Event ===
On March 26, 1935, the Las Vegas Elks announced their plans to stage a one-time, four-day celebration called "Helldorado." The Las Vegas Elks hired an out-of-town promoter to create a fundraising event to build a lodge for the fraternal organization. In the March announcement, the Elks said they had "retained Clyde Zerby, one of the foremost celebration managers and pageant directors in the United States, to direct the show." The Elks said the celebration would bring back "all the aspects" of life before Nevada became a state, including "a village resembling the early period to be constructed on a location of several acres." The Las Vegas Review-Journal reported, "Las Vegas will go Wild West in a big way next month when the local Elks stage what promises to be the biggest and most unique celebration ever attempted in this section."

=== Origin of name ===
The use of the title "Helldorado," recommended by Zerby and approved by the Elks, surprised Tombstone, Arizona residents. Tombstone had been using the title "Helldorado" for its annual celebration since 1929. The invented word came in a comment from prospectors coming to the area looking for gold, their El Dorado. Instead of finding gold, they found nothing but heat and poor-paying jobs; it was a real "Hell Dorado." After visiting Arizona, Zerby brought the name to Las Vegas.

=== 1935 Helldorado - The Plan ===
Zerby's popular pitch to communities in the 1930s was to "get completely away from the idea of rodeo, barbecue, or any of the other time-worn free amusements," adding that "people want to be thrilled and are ever looking for something different and something out-of-the-ordinary." Zerby's idea was called the “Pay Streak Trail." Along the trail were the fundraising opportunities including the "Helldorado Village," where "you will see the Last Chance Saloon, The Pot of Gold Gambling Hall, the Helldorado Dance Hall, the Girlie-Girlie Show, The Wild West Show, The Fat Girl, the Wild Man, The Belles of Helldorado, The Golden Wedding, The Old Fiddlers" along with other "concessions to amuse you." Zerby said all the "Pay Streak Trail" elements will "be operated by Elks and their families and friends."

The first Helldorado included opportunities for the community to unite around the Elks event with a parade and the growing of whiskers. Las Vegas Mayor Ernie Cragin issued a proclamation called on "all male citizens" to "allow their whisker grow and refrain from shaving." Charles P. Squires, the publisher of the Las Vegas Age newspaper, recalled, "Barbers of the community were doing a novel business in trimming whiskers in fancy patterns on the faces of public-spirited men of the town. Not only were the barbers called on to shape the whiskers, but they also had many dye jobs, turning out blue-black and flaming red beards." Zerby also provided western costumes from Paramount film studio in Hollywood, California for the Elks as part of the contract with the organization.

=== 1935 Helldorado - No Guns ===
There were parts of the wild west that Elks did not want to celebrate. On April 9, 1935, the Elks issued a call to "not carry guns of any sort" before and during the Helldorado celebration. The Elks statement said, "in a celebration of this sort, there will be joy unconfined, and anyone carrying a gun might believe himself called upon to unlimber it and start shooting. An affair of this kind might result in a terrible accident to some innocent bystander." The Elks added, "We realize that a gun in the hands of a novice is a potential instrument of death and therefore, to preclude any possibility of a serious accident, we have asked the police department to co-operate with us in carrying out of request that no one, not authorized by law to do so, be allowed to carry a gun during the celebration." Opening night, Thursday, April 25, 1935, was for Las Vegans "hometown night," and on Friday, April 26, a celebration of "old timer's" with a special parade.

The Las Vegas Evening Review-Journal reported, "the parade staged in Las Vegas Friday night was the most unique ever seen in the southwest. Thru out the two-mile length of the parade, not a single automobile or truck appeared. In the ancient buggies, carts and wagons rode revelers dressed as cowboys or prospectors and girls wearing full skirted dresses."

=== 1935 Helldorado - 'Lets Do It Again' ===
The first Las Vegas Helldorado was an overwhelming success. Before the event was over, the Las Vegas Evening Review-Journal, in a commentary titled "We Should Adopt Helldorado," pointed out, "If properly promoted, there is no reason Las Vegas' Helldorado cannot become one of the nation's most colorful and famous annual celebrations." On the evening of May 2, 1935, the Elks agreed and voted to make its version of Helldorado an annual affair." Zerby left Las Vegas days after the event to stage other shows around the western United States. The first Las Vegas Helldorado was Zerby's last.

Two months later, former Mayor Cragin formed an organization that led to the start of another Helldorado tradition a rodeo. Cragin and other Las Vegas horse racing enthusiasts formed the Las Vegas Horseman's Association. Part of the enthusiasm came from Nevadans as they could now gamble on horse races. The stated mission of the horseman's association was to "lease, own, control, manage and operated ground for giving public or private exhibitions of horse racing, and other similar sports and to hold, manage and operate racing contests, field games and any other outdoor entrainment of all kinds, to manage and control horse breeding clubs, horse racing clubs, baseball clubs for the giving of public or private exhibitions and entertainment."

=== 1936 The first Las Vegas Helldorado Rodeo ===
The caption over a front-page newspaper story on March 25, 1936, "Helldorado to Have Colorful Rodeo Program. Thrilling Show is promised by Horsemen's Association." The Las Vegas Horsemen's Association announced it was now a member of the "National Rodeo Association" and that "the Las Vegas rodeo will be staged strictly as an official and professional show." Like the first Helldorado a year earlier, the 1936 version with a rodeo and a beauty contest was successful and became the most popular community event in Las Vegas for more than six decades.

=== The 1940's Helldorado Flourishes during War and Post War years ===
Celebrating a mystical history of Las Vegas in the mid 1850's with parades, a rodeo, a beauty contest, and an old west-themed village, Helldorado was a popular public event through the 1930s and into the 1940s. During World War Two, with a patriotic theme, the Elks continued to produce Helldorado, including the parades, carnival, and rodeo.

The early 1940s found the Las Vegas valley the home of two major World War Two defense projects; the construction of an Army Air Force base and a magnesium production plant. Thousands of new residents poured into the valley. The 1943 Helldorado days, featuring western movie stars Roy Rogers, Trigger, and Tex Ritter broke all previous attendance records.

From the late 1930s to the early 1950s, Helldorado provided the background for three theatrical films. The Hollywood highlight is the 1946 movie Heldorado. Roy Rogers returned, this time bringing Dale Evans, 'Gabby' Hayes, and Trigger the Wonder Horse. Since there was already a 1934 Hollywood movie titled "Helldorado," according to movie rules, the Rogers-Evan version had to drop one of the "L's" in the film title.

=== In the 1950s and 1960s - Helldroado’s Popularity continued as it faced challenges. ===
Through the 1950s and 1960s Helldorado, with its rodeo, reflected the national popularity of western-themed television shows. Programs including Gunsmoke, Wagon Train, and Bonanza were among the most watched television programs during the 1950s and 1960s. Despite the city's rapid growth and the Las Vegas Strip, Elk's Helldorado and its rodeo began to struggle financially. There was competition.

In 1961, the Clark County Sheriff's Mounted Posse staged the "Rodeo of the Stars" outside the city limits, two blocks from the Las Vegas Strip. Touring carnivals and sideshows were also impacting attendance. The Elk's parades in the City of Las Vegas were also losing the support of the hotel-casinos, outside the city limits, on the Las Vegas strip. The owners of the major resorts felt the Elk's event was for downtown Las Vegas. To regain the support of the major resort, the Elks moved the rodeo out of the City in 1969 and 1971.

=== 1997 Helldorado Closes Down ===
In 1979, the Elks moved the Helldorado parade from Fremont Street in the city to the Las Vegas Strip. Then in 1985, overshadowing the Elk's rodeo, the National Finals Rodeo for the first time took place in Las Vegas. The National Finals Rodeo is scheduled to take place in Las Vegas through 2035. Through the 1990s, the Elk's Helldorado, with its carnival, and rodeo, moved to various locations throughout the Las Vegas valley, looking for a home. Then in 1997, the historic Elk's Helldorado ceased operations.

Helldorado returned eight years later, funded by the City of Las Vegas Centennial Commission.

== Present day ==
=== 2005 Helldorado returns as part of the City of Las Vegas 100th birthday celebration. ===
As a one-time event, in 2005, funded by the City of Las Vegas Centennial Commission, the Elk's Helldorado returned as part of the City of Las Vegas one hundredth birthday celebration. The Elk's organization, feeling it could turn Helldorado into a self-funding event, asked for and received funding from the city's Centennial Commission for more than a decade. However, 2016 was last year the Centennial Commission funded the Elks' efforts to produce a rodeo.

In 2018 and 2019, the City of Las Vegas Centennial Commission supported the production of parades under the Helldorado banner. In 2021, the City changed the name of the event to "Las Vegas Days" commemorating the community's birthday, May 1905, under the title "Las Vegas Days." Since then the original name “Helldorado” has been restored and the annual celebration continues.
