= Sierra Nevada Alliance =

American conservation network

The Sierra Nevada Alliance is a network of conservation groups encompassing 24 watersheds of the 650 kilometer-long Sierra Nevada in California and Nevada. Beginning in 1993, the Alliance protects and restores Sierra Nevada lands, watersheds, wildlife and communities.

== Mission ==
The network's mission is to protect and restore Sierra Nevada natural resources for future generations while promoting sustainable communities. The Alliance follows five guidelines: 1) Sustainable natural ecosystems, 2) Strong local economies, 3) Broad-based public involvement and support, 4) Rational water use and 5) A solution to a problem cannot be to transfer the problem some place else. The Alliance plays a unique role in facilitating grassroots conservation groups' and watershed groups' involvement with government agencies, public utilities and local organizations.

== Programs ==
Several programs work for regional protection and restoration of ecosystems and economies: Sierra Watersheds Program protecting critical habitats and restoring watershed health, Sierra Water and Climate Change Campaign by participating in local and statewide planning that adapts to climate change, Planning for the Future Campaign ensuring county use plans in Sierra counties adequately protect wild lands, natural communities with human population growth in light of climate change, establishment (2004) and support of the Sierra Nevada Conservancy, a nonregulatory state agency, and the Ski Area Environmental Scorecard, a ski area citizen's coalition encouraging ski areas in the 11 western states to model sustainable environmental policies and practices in light of global and local climate change, and Community Group Support to facilitate communication and uniform best management practices throughout the Sierra Nevada.

The organization has partnered with AmeriCorps since 2007 to place volunteers with environmental organizations.

A Conference of 80 or more conservation groups, collaborative watershed groups and land trusts is held annually. The Alliance is governed by a board of directors and the member groups. An Advisory Board of a diverse set of local, regional, statewide and national leaders provides collective wisdom.
