= 1999 Las Vegas mayoral election =

- May 4, 1999 (first round); June 8, 1999 (runoff)
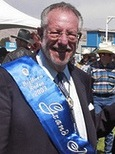

Candidate	Oscar Goodman	Arnie Adamsen	Mark L. Fine
First-round vote	24,267	14,395	7,968
First-round percentage	49.44%	29.33%	16.23%
Second-round vote	32,765	18,620
Second-round percentage	63.76%	36.2%
Mayor before election
Jan Laverty Jones
Elected Mayor
Oscar Goodman

The 1999 Las Vegas mayoral election took place on May 4 and June 8, 1999 to elect the mayor of Las Vegas, Nevada. The election was held concurrently with various other local elections, and was officially nonpartisan. It saw the election of criminal defense attorney Oscar Goodman. The incumbent mayor Jan Jones, had decided against running for a third term.

Goodman's main rivals in the race were Arnie Adamsen (a Las Vegas City Councilman) and Mark Fine (a local real estate developer). With no candidate winning a majority in the initial round of the election, a runoff was held between the top-two finishers: Goodman and Adamsen. Goodman won the runoff election with more than 63 percent of the vote, and took office as mayor on June 28. In the years that followed, he was re-elected in 2003 and 2007. His wife, Carolyn Goodman, succeeded him as mayor in 2011 and served until 2024 (having won three elections herself).

== Candidates ==
=== Background ===
Incumbent Democratic mayor Jan Jones had been elected in the 1991 Las Vegas mayoral election, and was re-elected four years later. She received praise and criticism during her time as mayor, which was sidelined by two failed gubernatorial bids in the 1994 and 1998 elections. Following the latter loss, Jones planned to seek a third term as Las Vegas mayor. Jay Bingham, a former Clark County Commissioner, announced on January 8, 1999 that he would run against Jones in the upcoming mayoral election. Jones announced on February 11 that she would no longer seek a third term, in order to spend more time with her family.

Candidate filing for the mayoral race began on February 23, 1999. The first major candidacies to be declared were Bingham and Arnie Adamsen, the latter a Democrat Las Vegas City Councilman. Another major candidate, developer Mark Fine, had previously been involved in the development of two local communities: Summerlin and Green Valley.

Also entering the race was criminal defense attorney Oscar Goodman, who had represented alleged mob members for 30 years. Goodman had considered a mayoral run in 1995, but decided against it, saying at the time, "I would have been the world's worst mayor. If I would have won the race, I would have hated the job. I just can't kiss people's rear ends." Fine and Goodman, both longtime friends and millionaire Democrats, declared their candidacies on March 5, 1999, the last day of filing. A total of 10 candidates had entered the mayoral race, although Bingham dropped out soon thereafter, citing a heart problem.

Adamsen had a number of endorsements, including the Culinary Workers Union, the Howard Hughes Corporation, and the Las Vegas Chamber of Commerce. Fine described himself as the "closest thing" to a Republican, and had support from several prominent locals belonging to the party, including Tom Wiesner.

Goodman's chances of winning the election were seen as unlikely. According to political commentator Jon Ralston, conventional wisdom said that Goodman could not win but would at least run an entertaining campaign. He compared Goodman with Bob Stupak, another political outsider who ran for mayor, unsuccessfully, in 1987. Goodman would go on to be heavily supported by gambling companies and the legal community.

=== Proposals and viewpoints ===
Goodman led a populist campaign. He criticized the condition of downtown Las Vegas, calling the Fremont Street Experience a failed redevelopment effort. He said further: "The whole downtown area stinks. You've got Neanderthal-type operations down there. People (downtown) don't realize that Las Vegas is the entertainment capital of the world, and unless downtown keeps up, it's going to be like the core of the apple rotting. ... If they don't like to hear that, screw 'em." Goodman said he would publicly embarrass downtown casinos in order to get them to refurbish. This would create better competition against resorts on the Las Vegas Strip, which is outside of city limits.

A focus for Goodman was to raise developer fees as mayor, providing the city with more money to refurbish older neighborhoods. It was noted that such a proposal could not be put into motion without the approval of the Nevada Legislature. Adamsen opposed an increase in the fees, and supported the use of master planning to guide the city's growth, noting the success of Summerlin and other communities.

Adamsen's top priorities as mayor would include the construction of a public monorail, as well as a long-planned high-speed train connecting to southern California. He would also double the size of the CAT bus system. Among his other proposals was a city hall customer service department, which would eliminate bureaucracy. Adamsen also sought to repeal several outdated laws, aiming to make the local government less intrusive and more business friendly. Instead of a monorail system, which was expected to cost $1.5 billion, Goodman considered the idea of using the Union Pacific Railroad to shuttle people between downtown and the Strip.

Although Goodman supported the legalization of drugs and prostitution, he said he would not advocate for such changes as mayor: "I think it would offend the populace and I wouldn't do anything to ever embarrass my constituents." Under state law at the time, it was a felony to possess any amount of marijuana. Goodman later said that he supported efforts from the state legislature to overturn this law, instead making first-time offenses punishable by a $500 fine for less than an ounce of marijuana possession. Goodman also supported the use of medical marijuana, while Adamsen opposed marijuana use of any kind, stating that it could lead to more-harmful drugs.

Adamsen argued that his 12 years on the city council made him the most qualified person to serve as mayor. Fine viewed his own lack of political experience as a positive. In April 1999, a month before the election, Fine criticized Goodman's occupation as a criminal defense attorney for the first time. Las Vegas had worked to create a family friendly image, and Fine said that electing Goodman as mayor would send a poor message around the U.S., given his past legal representation of mobsters. Adamsen would also go on to oppose Goodman's election on the basis of his occupation. Goodman said that mobsters made up only five percent of the clients he had represented. He also alleged that Adamsen and Fine would not be able to take certain positions on issues related to city growth, due to their ties with local developers.

== Campaign and advertising ==
By the end of March 1999, Goodman and Adamsen were tied in a poll commissioned by the latter candidate, both sitting at 30 percent with Fine at 14. In mid-April 1999, with less than three weeks until the election, Fine began airing a television ad which criticized Sister Cities, a city program started by Adamsen in 1987. Sister Cities was meant to lure foreign businesses to Las Vegas, and the city had spent more than $500,000 on the program. Adamsen, partly financed by taxpayer money, had made numerous trips to Asia to attract potential businesses, but his efforts failed. Fine later debuted a radio ad accusing Adamsen of using the program to raise campaign money from Koreans, in exchange for land deals. Adamsen accused Fine of racism in his ad, a claim that Fine dismissed as a diversion from the program.

Subsequent polling showed Goodman with a lead. The polls prompted a change in strategy for Adamsen, who began airing negative ads against Fine and Goodman 10 days before the election. One ad accused Fine of causing the city's traffic problems through his developments, to which Fine responded that Adamsen "has done nothing for 12 years and he's complaining about a guy who has developed quality growth on his own. He has been responsible for managing growth and has failed." Adamsen's other ad used Goodman's 1995 comments against him.

In the days before the election, Adamsen launched ads criticizing Goodman for his opposition to Megan's Law. Goodman had voiced this opinion several years earlier, during an appearance on a local law-focused television program. In response to the ad, Goodman said his role on the program was to argue for unpopular viewpoints, and that he did not believe much of what he said.

== Election and runoff ==
Las Vegas had more than 180,000 registered voters, and the 1999 mayoral election was the first in city history to use early voting, in an effort to increase voter turnout. The election was held on May 4, 1999. Because no candidate received more than 50 percent of the vote, a runoff election was scheduled for the following month between Goodman and Adamsen. Goodman had received 49 percent of the vote, with Adamsen getting 29 percent and Fine 18. Goodman came within 277 votes needed to win the election outright.

Political consultants viewed Adamsen as a major underdog against Goodman. Fine endorsed Goodman in the days after the first election, having met with both candidates. Mayor Jones did not plan to endorse either candidate, although she did express concern that Goodman, if elected, would quickly grow bored of the job. Goodman and Adamsen raised and spent more than $2 million combined on their campaigns, making 1999 the most expensive mayoral election in Las Vegas history. Adamsen's campaign fundraising slowed considerably after the initial election, and he was unable to afford additional television advertising in the weeks leading up to the runoff.

The runoff was held on June 8, 1999, with 26-percent voter turnout. As expected, Goodman won the election overwhelmingly, with more than 63 percent of the vote. His win was partially attributed to his flamboyant personality. Adamsen, generally a private person, said, "I could have run a better campaign. I could have been more flamboyant because you are selling something in an election. But I wanted to be true to me." Adamsen, as required by city statute, had to resign his seat on the city council to run for mayor. His spot was taken over by Lynette Boggs McDonald.

=== Results ===
First round results
Candidate	Votes	%
Oscar Goodman	24,267	49.44
Arnie Adamsen	14,395	29.33
Mark L. Fine	7,968	16.23
Frank La Spina	942	1.92
Cruz Olague	574	1.17
Anthony D. Snowden	358	0.73
Tom McGowan	291	0.59
Hilary Michael Milko	188	0.38
Douglas Opolka	104	0.21
Total votes	49,087	

Runoff results
Party	Candidate	Votes	%
Nonpartisan	Oscar Goodman	32,765	63.76
Nonpartisan	Arnie Adamsen	18,620	36.24
Total votes		51,385	

== Aftermath ==
Goodman took office on June 28, 1999. Among his priorities was the redevelopment of downtown Las Vegas, with projects such as Symphony Park and the World Market Center. He was re-elected in 2003 and 2007. His wife, Carolyn Goodman, succeeded him as mayor. She took office in 2011 and served as mayor until 2024, having won three terms herself.
