= 2024 Las Vegas mayoral election =

- June 11, 2024 (first round); November 5, 2024 (runoff)
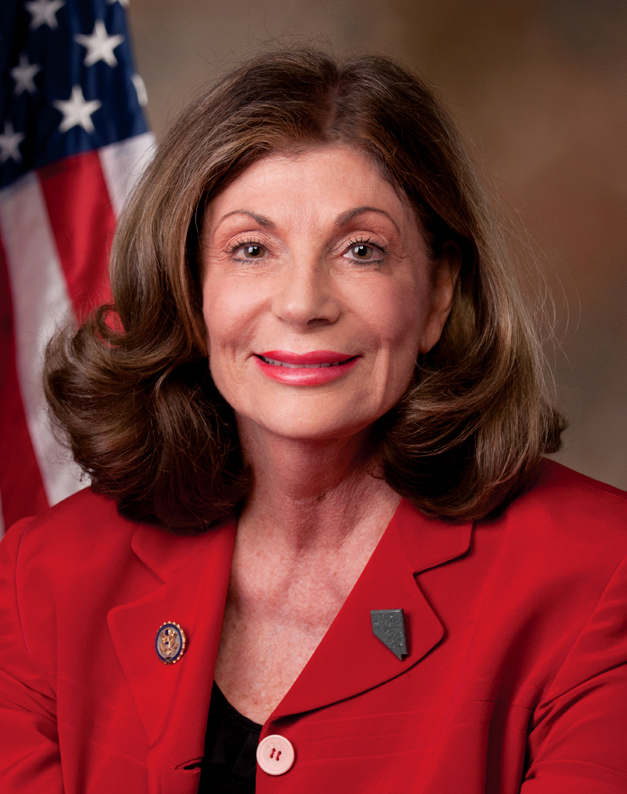

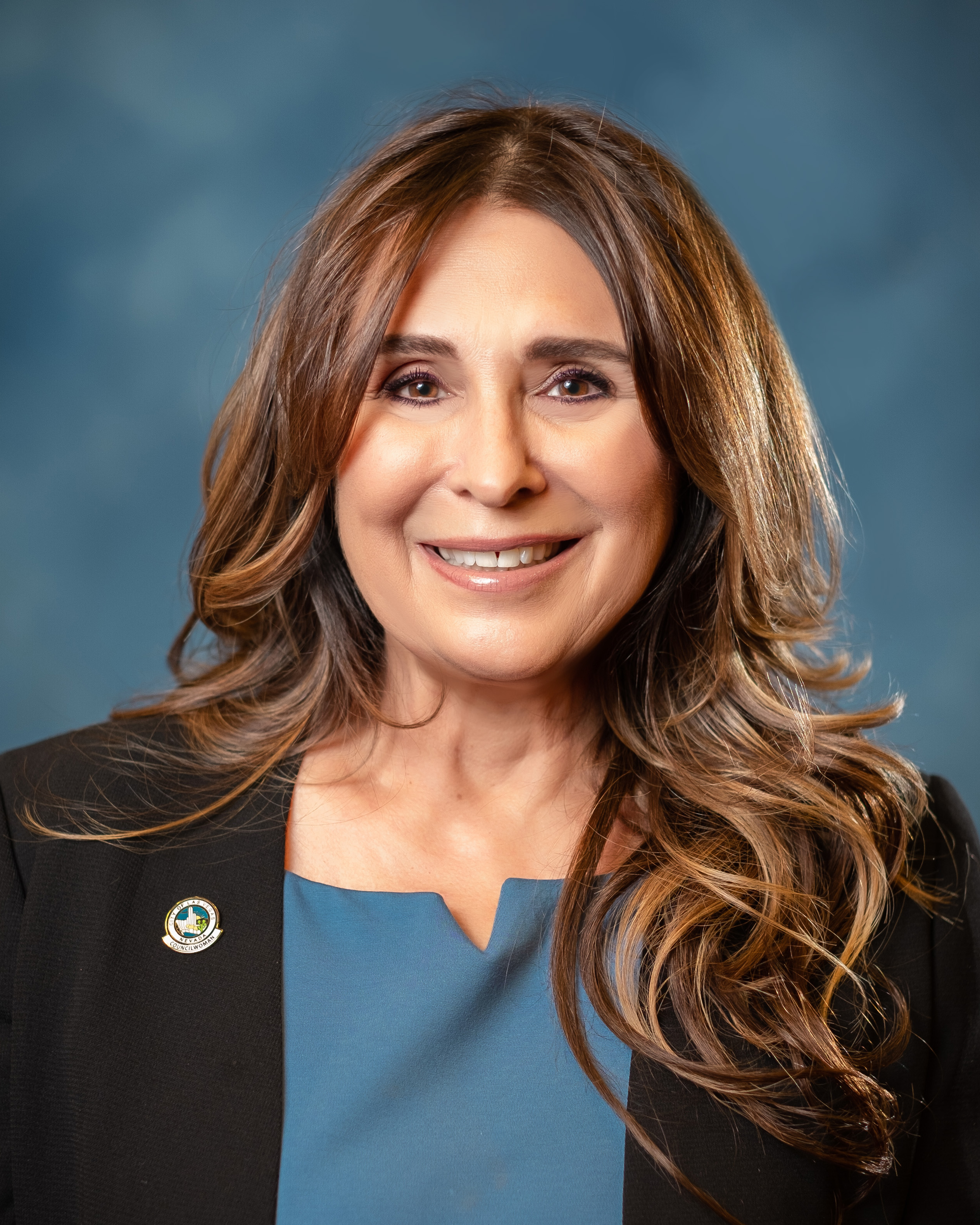

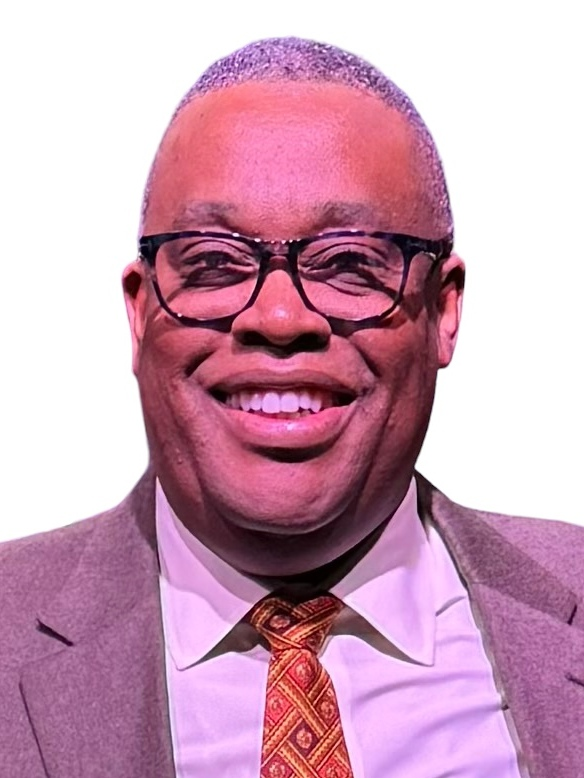
Candidate	Shelley Berkley	Victoria Seaman	Cedric Crear
First round	25,784; 35.69%	20,896; 28.93%	13,673; 18.93%
Runoff	129,977; 53.21%	114,429; 46.79%	Eliminated
- Runoff precinct results Berkley: 50–60% 60–70% 70–80% Seaman: 50–60% 60–70% No data
Mayor before election
Carolyn Goodman
Independent
Elected mayor
Shelley Berkley
Democratic

The 2024 Las Vegas mayoral election took place on June 11, 2024, with a runoff on November 5, to elect the mayor of Las Vegas, Nevada. Incumbent independent mayor Carolyn Goodman was term-limited and could not seek re-election to a fourth term in office. This was the first mayoral election in Las Vegas since 1995 where no candidates were from the Goodman family. On November 7, former Congresswoman Shelley Berkley became the mayor-elect of Las Vegas as Las Vegas City Councilwoman Victoria Seaman conceded the race. Berkley was sworn in on December 4, 2024.

== Candidates ==
=== Declared ===
- Kolawole Akingbade
- Tera Anderson, land development professional
- Lynn Baird, retired Nevada Employment Security Division official
- Shelley Berkley, former U.S. Representative for Nevada's 1st congressional district (1999–2013) and nominee for U.S. Senate in 2012 (Party affiliation: Democratic)
- Dan Chapman, cosmetics manufacturing company owner
- Cedric Crear, city councilor for the 5th ward (Party affiliation: Democratic)
- Irina Hansen, salon owner
- Kara Jenkins, administrator of the Nevada Equal Rights Commission
- Eric Medlin, IT specialist
- Donna Miller, nurse and healthcare executive
- Michael Pacino
- Deb Peck, insurance agent (Note: Peck is a self-described conservative, but her party affiliation is unknown.)
- Victoria Seaman, city councilor for the 2nd ward and former state assemblywoman (Party affiliation: Republican)
- William Walls III, businessman and perennial candidate (Note: Walls (who served as an aide to Chicago Mayor Harold Washington from 1983 to 1985) had previously run as a Republican candidate for governor of Nevada in 2022; independent candidate for governor of Illinois in 2018; candidate for mayor of Chicago in 2007, 2011, 2015, and 2019; Democratic candidate for Illinois's 1st congressional district in 2008; candidate for Chicago city clerk in 1999, 2003, and 2019) in both Nevada and Illinois

=== Disqualified ===
- Janiecia Fernandez

=== Declined ===
- Peter Guzman, president and CEO of the Nevada Latin Chamber of Commerce
- Michele Fiore, Nye County Justice of the Peace, former Las Vegas city councilor, former state assemblywoman, and nominee for Nevada State Treasurer in 2022 (Party affiliation: Republican)
- Steve Wolfson, Clark County District Attorney and former Las Vegas city councilor (endorsed Berkley)

== Endorsements ==
Endorsements in bold were made after the first round.

Shelley Berkley

Local officials

- **Nancy Brune**, city councilwoman
- **Cedric Crear**, city councilman and third-place finisher in the first round
- **Olivia Diaz**, city councilwoman
- **Brian Knudsen**, city councilman

Labor unions

- Culinary Workers Union
- LiUNA Local 872
- Southern Nevada Labor Council

Newspapers

- **Las Vegas Review-Journal**
- **Las Vegas Sun**
- Las Vegas Weekly
Cedric Crear

Individuals

- Toni Braxton, singer
Victoria Seaman

Individuals

- Wayne Allyn Root, radio host

Labor unions

- Nevada Fraternal Order of Police

Organizations

- Republican Mayors Association

== Forums & debates ==
=== First round ===
2024 Las Vegas mayoral candidate forum & debates
No.	Date	Host	Moderator	Link	Nonpartisan	Nonpartisan	Nonpartisan	Nonpartisan	Nonpartisan	Nonpartisan
Key: P Participant A Absent N Not invited I Invited W Withdrawn										
Key: P Participant A Absent N Not invited I Invited W Withdrawn					Shelley Berkley	Cedric Crear	Kara Jenkins	Donna Miller	Deb Peck	Victoria Seaman
1	Oct. 17, 2023	Battle Born News; Clark County Chamber of Commerce; Vote Nevada			**P**	**I**	**P**	**P**	**I**	**P**
2	May 15, 2024	The Nevada Independent	Jon Ralston	The Nevada Independent	**P**	**P**	**N**	**N**	**N**	**P**
3	May 23, 2024	KLAS-TV			**P**	**P**	**N**	**N**	**N**	**P**

=== Runoff ===
2024 Las Vegas mayoral runoff candidate forums & debates
No.	Date	Host	Moderator	Link	Nonpartisan	Nonpartisan
Key: P Participant A Absent N Not invited I Invited W Withdrawn						
Key: P Participant A Absent N Not invited I Invited W Withdrawn					Shelley Berkley	Victoria Seaman
1	Jul. 31, 2024	Vegas Chamber		YouTube	**P**	**P**
2	Sep. 25, 2024	The Nevada Independent	Jon Ralston	YouTube	**P**	**P**
3	Oct. 7, 2024	KTNV-TV		KTNV-TV	**P**	**P**
4	Oct. 8, 2024	KLAS-TV		YouTube	**P**	**P**

== Polling ==
Poll source	Date(s) administered	Sample size (Note: Key: A – all adults RV – registered voters LV – likely voters V – unclear)	Margin of error	Shelley Berkley	Cedric Crear	Kara Jenkins	Victoria Seaman	Other	Undecided
Emerson College (Note: Poll conducted for KLAS-TV and The Hill)	April 1–2, 2024	500 (LV)	± 4.3%	**16%**	7%	2%	**12%**	8% (Note: Janiecia Fernandez with 2%; Tera Anderson, Lynn Baird, Daniel Chapman, Donna Miller, Michael Pacino, and Deb Peck with 1%; Kolawole Akingbade, Irina Hansen, Eric Medlin, and William Walls with <1%)	**56%**

== Results ==
Results
Candidate	Votes	%
Shelley Berkley	**25,784**	**35.69%**
Victoria Seaman	**20,896**	**28.93%**
Cedric Crear	13,673	18.93%
Tera Anderson	3,144	4.35%
Kara Jenkins	1,671	2.31%
Dan Chapman	1,397	1.93%
Donna Miller	1,104	1.53%
Lynn Baird	962	1.33%
Irina Hansen	845	1.17%
Williams Walls III	653	0.90%
Michael Pacino	616	0.85%
Deb Peck	580	0.80%
Kola Akingbade	531	0.74%
Eric Medlin	382	0.53%
Total votes	**72,238**	**100.00%**

Runoff results
Candidate	Votes	%
Shelley Berkley	**129,977**	**53.21%**
Victoria Seaman	114,429	46.79%
Total votes	**244,406**	**100.00%**

== Notes ==
Partisan clients
