= 2011 Las Vegas mayoral election =

- June 7, 2011
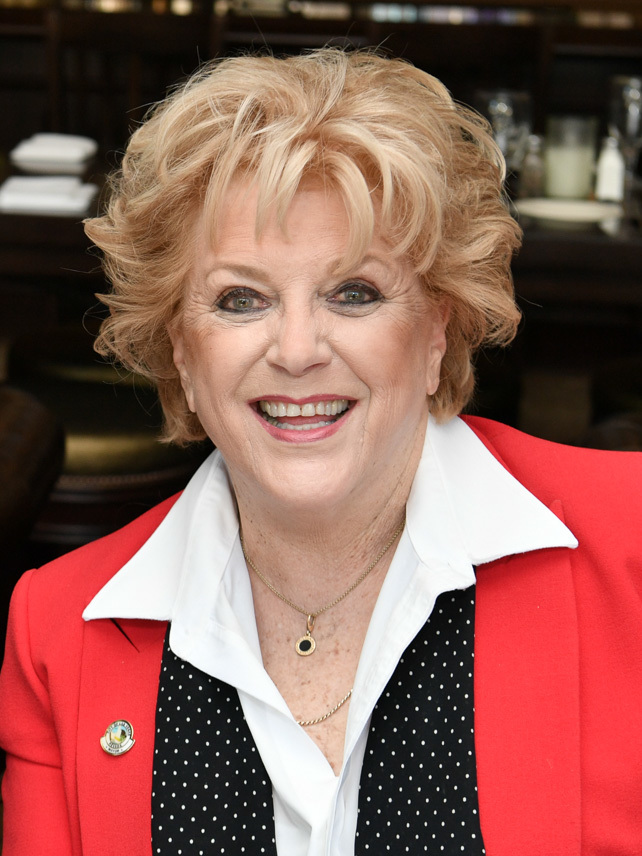

Candidate	Carolyn Goodman	Chris Giunchigliani	Larry Brown
First-round vote	18,040	8,395	8,380
First-round percentage	37.28%	17.35%	17.32%
Second-round vote	33,104	21,601
Second-round percentage	60.51%	39.49%
Candidate	Victor Chaltiel	Steven D. Ross	George Harris
First-round vote	6,763	3,053	2,509
First-round percentage	13.98%	6.31%	5.18%
Mayor before election
Oscar Goodman
Independent Democrat
Elected Mayor
Carolyn Goodman
Independent

The 2011 Las Vegas mayoral election took place on June 7, 2011. Oscar Goodman, the incumbent Las Vegas mayor, was ineligible to run for a fourth term due to term limits. His wife, Carolyn Goodman, entered the race and won 37 percent of the vote in the initial round of voting on April 5, 2011. Chris Giunchigliani, a Clark County Commissioner, came in second with 17 percent.

The race included 18 candidates, and because none received more than 50 percent of the vote, a runoff election was held on June 7. Goodman easily won against Giunchigliani with 60 percent of the vote. She took office on July 6, 2011, and is set to leave in 2024, having won two more terms.

== Candidates ==
Incumbent Las Vegas mayor Oscar Goodman, a former attorney, had been elected to three terms between 1999 and 2007; he was term-limited from running again. His wife Carolyn Goodman, who also lacked political experience, said in 2009 that she would not consider a mayoral run unless she felt that the right candidate had not emerged. Carolyn Goodman founded the private Meadows school in 1984, and ran it for the next 25 years.

The 2011 mayoral election had the most crowded candidate field in decades, with 18 people entering the race. Among the candidates were Clark County Commissioners Chris Giunchigliani and Larry Brown, and Steve Ross, a Las Vegas City Councilman. Goodman and Giunchigliani filed their candidacies on February 2, 2011, two days before the filing deadline. Goodman was quickly seen as the frontrunner. Giunchigliani initially did not plan to run, but changed her mind following encouragement and after researching her odds of winning.

The top contenders were Brown, Giunchigliani, Goodman, Ross, and businessman Victor Chaltiel. Other candidates included retired car salesman Joe Falco, who previously ran in the 2003 mayoral election; and Ed Uehling, a real estate investor who previously made an unsuccessful run for Sheriff of Clark County in 1994.

== Election results ==
The election was held on April 5, 2011. Goodman won 37 percent of the vote, with Giunchigliani in second place, the latter candidate beating Brown by 15 votes. Because no candidate won more than 50 percent of the vote, a runoff election was held between Goodman and Giunchigliani on June 7, 2011. Goodman easily prevailed, winning 60 percent of the vote. Although Giunchigliani had the advantage of political experience, Goodman was a popular candidate for her personality, which was seen as a contributing factor in her victory. She spent $600,000 in advertising, and her husband also campaigned for her.

Jobs and the economy were top issues in the election, and Goodman vowed to continue her husband's efforts to revitalize downtown Las Vegas. However, she dismissed suggestions that her candidacy was a way for her husband to continue serving through her: "I am very much my own person. I don't listen to him. He doesn't listen to me. We're very much individuals."

Goodman took office on July 6, 2011. She was re-elected in the 2015 and 2019 mayoral elections, and left office in 2024, marking a 25-year legacy for the Goodmans in Las Vegas.

=== First round ===
First round results
Candidate	Votes	%
Carolyn Goodman	18,040	37.28
Chris Giunchigliani	8,395	17.35
Larry Brown	8,380	17.32
Victor Chaltiel	6,763	13.98
Steven D. Ross	3,053	6.31
George Harris	2,509	5.18
Katie Duncan	485	1.00
Angel F. Vasquez	145	0.30
Anthony Wernicke	142	0.29
Deborah Love	98	0.20
Christine Montez	83	0.17
Duke A. Breuer	63	0.13
Joe Falco	60	0.12
Abdul H. Shabazz	47	0.10
Tim Gamble	41	0.08
Marlene Rogoff	36	0.07
Larry M. Jeppesen	31	0.06
Ed Uehling	21	0.04
Total votes	48,392	100.00

=== Runoff ===
Runoff results
Candidate	Votes	%
Carolyn Goodman	33,104	60.51
Chris Giunchigliani	21,601	39.49
Total votes	54,705	100.00
