= 2007 Las Vegas mayoral election =

- April 3, 2007
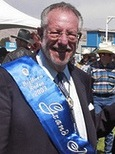

Candidate	Oscar Goodman	Tom McGowan
Popular vote	26,845	2,170
Percentage	83.69%	6.76%
Mayor before election
Oscar Goodman
Elected Mayor
Oscar Goodman

The 2007 Las Vegas mayoral election took place on April 3, 2007, to elect the mayor of Las Vegas, Nevada. The election was held concurrently with various other local elections, and was officially nonpartisan.

Incumbent Mayor Oscar Goodman, a Democrat in office since 1999, received a majority of votes in the first round of the election, and was reelected to a third term in office with no need for a runoff. Perennial candidate Tom McGowan came in a distant second place.

== Candidates and election results ==
Incumbent Las Vegas mayor Oscar Goodman was first elected in the 1999 election, and was re-elected in 2003. He announced in April 2006 that he would seek a third and final term as mayor. Goodman filed his candidacy on January 23, 2007. His closest rival was Tom McGowan, a former entertainer and longtime critic of the Las Vegas City Council who previously ran in the 1999 and 2003 elections.

The election was held on April 3, 2007. Goodman won overwhelmingly, with nearly 84 percent of the vote, while McGowan came in a distant second with less than 7 percent.

Results
Candidate	Votes	%
Oscar Goodman (incumbent)	26,845	83.69
Tom McGowan	2,170	6.76
Sandra Coon	1,026	3.20
Beatrice Denise Turner	817	2.55
Yvette Chevalier	743	2.32
Tony Ianni	476	1.48
Total votes	32,077	
