= 2015 Las Vegas mayoral election =

- April 7, 2015
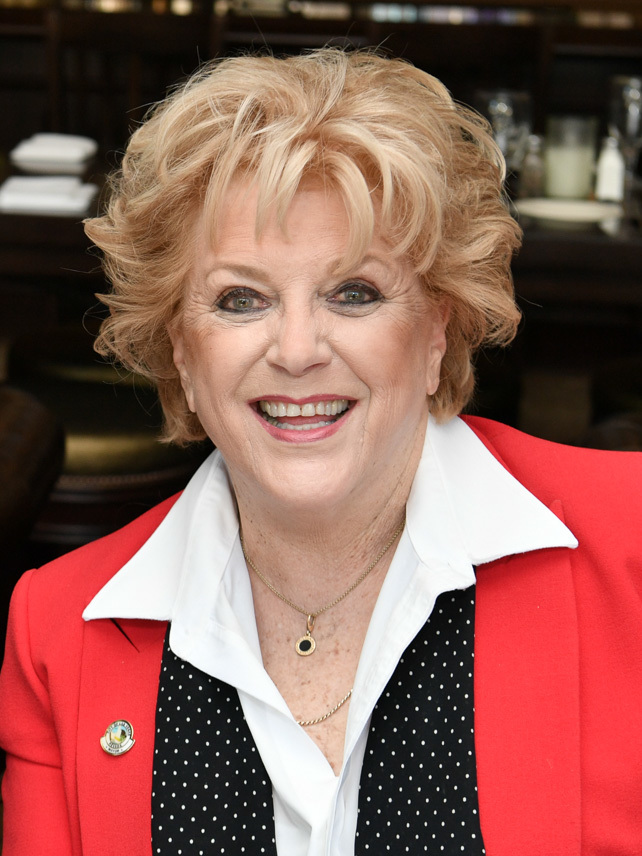

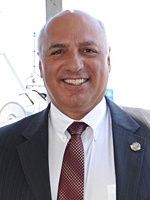
Candidate	Carolyn Goodman	Stavros Anthony
Popular vote	20,443	15,761
Percentage	54.54%	42.05%
Mayor before election
Carolyn Goodman
Elected Mayor
Carolyn Goodman

The 2015 Las Vegas mayoral election took place on April 7, 2015, to elect the Mayor of Las Vegas, Nevada. The election was held concurrently with various other local elections, and was officially nonpartisan.

Incumbent Mayor Carolyn Goodman, an independent in office since 2011, sought and won a second term in office against Stavros Anthony, a Las Vegas City Councilman.

== Candidates and campaign ==
The major candidates were incumbent mayor Carolyn Goodman, an independent elected in the 2011 race, and Stavros Anthony, a Las Vegas City Councilman and Republican. Anthony was also the city's mayor pro tem, serving as the second-in-command on the city council. He announced his candidacy for mayor on January 20, 2015, going up against Goodman in her re-election bid. Goodman was surprised by his decision to run against her: "He told me just a few months ago what a great job I was doing. And that while he'd love to run for mayor, he wasn't going to."

A major item of debate was an attempt by Goodman to build a Major League Soccer stadium, partially funded by taxpayer dollars, at Symphony Park in downtown Las Vegas. Anthony had been an outspoken critic of the stadium project, and had opposed it in the 4–3 city council vote in favor of it. The project was Anthony's primary reason for running; it was scrapped in February 2015. Goodman spent more than $755,000 in campaign advertising, while Anthony spent $281,000. Other candidates included Phil Cory (an Internet marketer) and Abdul Shabazz (a perennial candidate).

== Results ==
The election was held on April 7, 2015. Goodman easily won re-election with nearly 55 percent of the vote to Anthony's 42 percent. Had no candidate received a majority of the vote in the first round, a runoff election would have been held on June 2. A week after the election, Goodman recommended that Anthony be replaced by councilman Steve Ross as mayor pro tem; the motion passed unanimously.

Las Vegas mayoral general election, 2015
Candidate	Votes	%
Carolyn Goodman (incumbent)	20,443	54.54
Stavros Anthony	15,761	42.05
Phil "LOL" Cory	955	2.55
Abdul Shabazz	326	0.87
Total votes	37,485	100
