= Ross Goodman =

American attorney (born 1970)

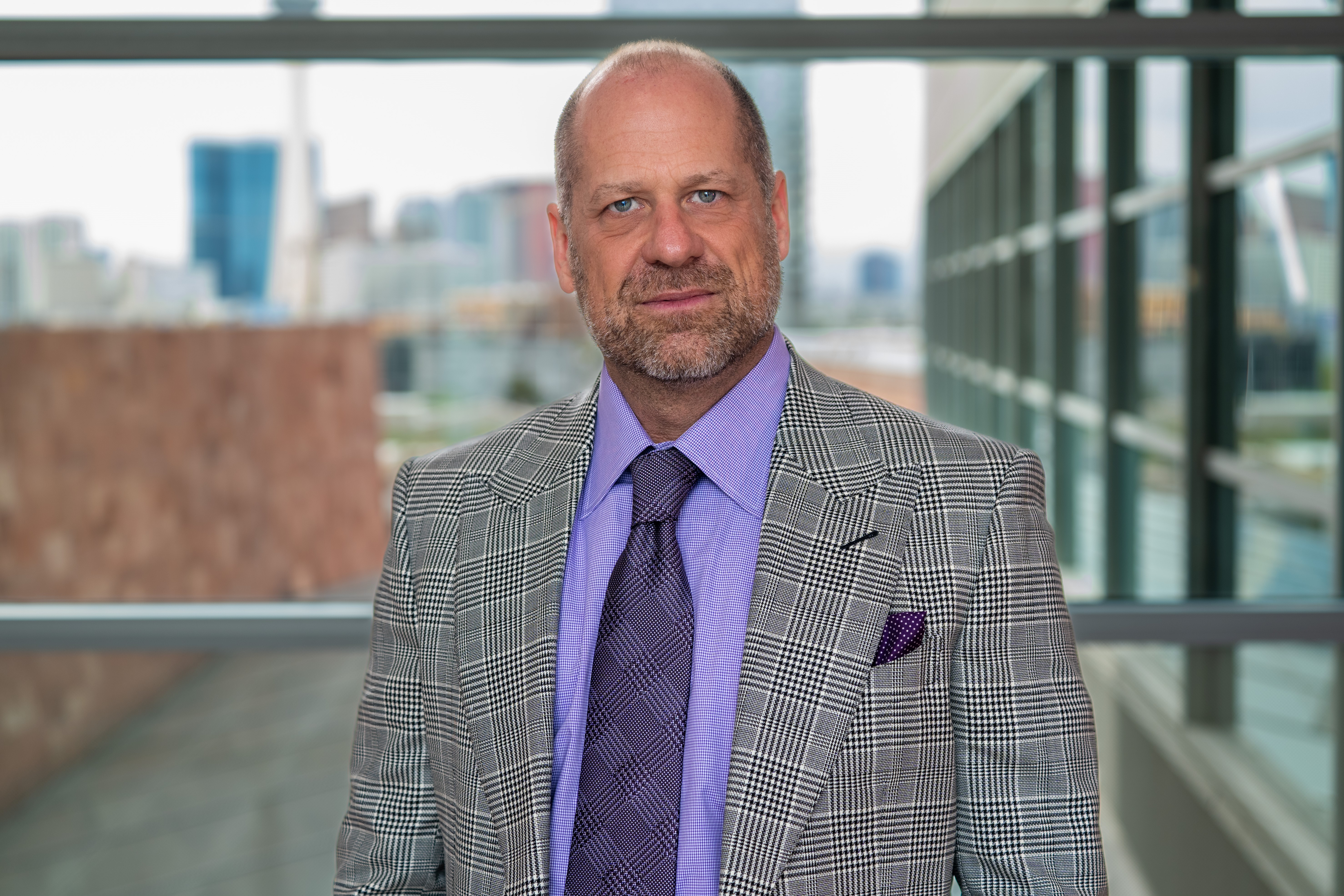
- Born: Ross Carl Goodman; February 19, 1970 (age 56); Las Vegas, Nevada, U.S.
- Occupation: Attorney
- Parents: Oscar Goodman (father); Carolyn Goodman (mother)
- Website: www.goodmanlawgroup.com

Ross Carl Goodman (born February 19, 1970) is an American attorney based in Las Vegas. He is the son of Carolyn and Oscar Goodman, who have each served as mayor of Las Vegas.

== Early life and education ==
Goodman was born in Las Vegas, Nevada. He is the son of Oscar Goodman, an attorney and former mayor of Las Vegas, and Carolyn Goodman, who succeeded Oscar as mayor. Goodman received a B.A. from the University of San Diego in 1992 and a Juris Doctor from the University of Tulsa College of Law in 1995.

Goodman was commissioned as a second lieutenant in the United States Marine Corps in 1992. He served as a judge advocate and attained the rank of major in the United States Marine Corps Reserve before entering private practice.

== Career ==
Goodman founded his law firm in 2001 in Las Vegas, Nevada. He has represented several high-profile clients and has been featured on Nancy Grace and truTV (formerly Court TV).

=== Hells Angels ===
In 2002, Goodman represented a member of the Hells Angels in a case arising from the infamous Laughlin River Run Riot, where the Hells Angels and Mongols motorcycle clubs engaged in a massive riot resulting in multiple deaths. Goodman's client was dismissed of murder and racketeering charges.

=== Gloria Guzman ===
In 2006, Goodman defended Gloria Guzman, a 26-year-old woman accused of drowning her ex-husband Mark Richards, a quadriplegic. Guzman served the minimum sentence of one year and was placed on probation for one year. The murder trial was featured on CNN's Nancy Grace.

=== David Saxe ===
Entertainment producer and majority partner of the V Theatre David Saxe enlisted Goodman when his associates made a move to vote him out. After a legal battle Saxe regained control of the theatre.

=== Jerry Lewis ===
In 2008, Goodman represented comedian and entertainer Jerry Lewis in a firearms charge. Lewis was charged with carrying a concealed weapon in McCarran International Airport in Las Vegas, Nevada. The case was dismissed and Lewis was released without fines.

=== Vision Airlines ===
In 2010, Goodman represented former Vision Airlines employees who were awarded over five million dollars in back hazard pay for flying CIA, State Department and Blackwater staff to Baghdad and Kabul, which were then considered war zones.

In 2011, Monica Contreras was allegedly groped in a witness room by a Clark County Family Court marshal. She was at Family Court with her daughter for a separate hearing about her divorce. The act was caught by security cameras, and the two marshals and the hearing master were named the defendants in the lawsuit. Clark County, the state of Nevada and the courts also were named as defendants. Goodman represented Contreras who settled with both the state and county for $200,000.

=== Crystal Williams ===
With the help of Ross Goodman, Crystal Williams pressed charges against Steve Rushfield, a Family Court marshals supervisor. She alleges that she was choked by Rushfield while she was restrained in a holding cell in 2010.

=== Nick Diaz ===
Atty. Ross Goodman also handled the marijuana case of UFC welterweight contender Nick Diaz. He was supposed to be suspended for 1 year because of taking marijuana metabolites and also for providing false information on his pre-fight questionnaires. In defense, Goodman said that the marijuana metabolites found in Nick's system did not violate the drug use policy of the Nevada State Athletic Commission (NSAC), the state agency that regulates UFC matches. He said that it is "out of competition use" which is permitted by the WADA regulations.

=== Wanderlei Silva ===
In late May 2014, Wanderlei Silva refused to take a random drug test. NSAC issued an indefinite suspension against Silva including fines. Ross Goodman defended Silva. He argued that Silva was not under contract and not a licensee at the time of the test. Goodman insisted that the commission's random drug testing law does not cover non-licensed fighter.

=== Chael Sonnen ===
The NSAC has placed a mandatory two-year suspension against Chael Sonnen due to his performance-enhancing drug use. On July 30, the NSAC notified Sonnen that his grappling match in Metamoris 4 violates the terms of the suspension. They threaten that they will sue Sonnen for the violation. In defense, Ross Goodman has sent a series of response letter that challenged the NSAC's definition of competing. Goodman clarifies that jiu-jitsu is not subject to the commission, providing light that Sonnen is free to compete in this type of competition.

=== Todd Seifert ===
Todd Seifert, is a tourist from Ohio charged with hit-and-run. He allegedly hit Andrade, a Las Vegas man, who was crossing Las Vegas Boulevard on his way to work. With Goodman's advice and representation, Seifert plead guilty and earned a "lenient sentence".

=== Kenny Sanchez ===
Bishop Gorman football coach Kenny Sanchez went to trial in April after being accused of physically abusing Brooke Stewart, his former girlfriend and the mother of his son, during the previous Christmas. Sanchez eventually obtained a 'Not Guilty' verdict after Stewart recanted her previous accusations.

=== Duane Keith "Keffe D" Davis ===
Attorney Goodman appeared on behalf of Duane Davis, the suspected killer of 2Pac, during pre-arraignment proceedings in October 2023. Two weeks later, Goodman told The Associated Press that he would not be representing Davis after reaching an impasse related to the terms of a court ordered agreement.

=== Nate Diaz ===
Goodman represented Nate Diaz during misdemeanor battery proceedings in Las Vegas in 2024, after Diaz was accused of striking a nightclub bouncer at Caesars Palace. Goodman argued the viral video of the incident lacked context and highlighted Diaz’s attempts to de-escalate the situation. The charge was ultimately dismissed.

=== Damon Arnette ===
Goodman defended former NFL player Damon Arnette when facing multiple felony charges in Las Vegas, including assault with a deadly weapon and carrying a concealed weapon without a permit. Goodman negotiated a dismissal of the most serious charges.

=== Chris Lammons ===
Goodman represented NFL defensive back Chris Lammons when he faced legal scrutiny tied to a high-profile assault incident involving fellow NFL player Alvin Kamara. Goodman emphasized Lammons' cooperation with authorities and challenged the strength of the allegations, achieving a resolution that allowed Lammons to continue his football career.

== Other ventures ==
In 2005, Goodman acquired the World Fighting Alliance (WFA) with partner Louis Palazzo. The WFA, a mixed martial arts (MMA) organization held successful events at the Hard Rock Hotel and Casino in Las Vegas and The Forum in Inglewood. Goodman negotiated the first 30-minute slot on Showtime to feature an MMA organization. Under his management, the WFA acquired top ranked MMA fighters to include future UFC champions, Rich Franklin, Quinton Jackson, and Lyoto Machida, as well as Urijah Faber who became a champion in the WEC. In 2006 Goodman along with partners sold the WFA to the UFC.
