= Victoria Seaman =

American politician (born 1958)

- Official portrait, 2025

Regional Director of the U.S. Department of Health and Human Services
- In office August 25, 2025 – current
- President: Donald Trump
- Secretary: Robert F Kennedy Jr.

Member of Las Vegas City Council from the 2nd Ward
- In office 2019 – August 25, 2025
- Preceded by: Steve Seroka
- Succeeded by: Kara Kelley (Interim)

Member of the Nevada Assembly from the 34th district
- In office November 15, 2014 – November 9, 2016
- Preceded by: William Horne
- Succeeded by: Shannon Bilbray-Axelrod

Personal details
- Born: October 19, 1958 (age 67) Santa Maria, California, U.S.
- Party: Republican
- Spouse: John
- Children: 1
- Education: College of Southern Nevada; University of Nevada, Las Vegas (BS)
- Website: Campaign website

Victoria Seaman (born October 19, 1958) is an American politician who served as a member of the Las Vegas City Council from the 2nd ward from 2019 to 2025. A Republican, she formerly represented Clark County's District 34 in the Nevada Assembly from 2014 to 2016, and was the first Republican Latina elected to the body. In 2024, Seaman unsuccessfully ran for mayor of Las Vegas, finishing as the election's runner-up.

== Early life and education ==
Seaman was born on October 19, 1958, in Santa Maria, California. She has an Associate degree in Political Science from the College of Southern Nevada. She has a bachelor's degree in Urban Studies with a minor in Family Studies from the University of Nevada, Las Vegas. She is an entrepreneur who created and managed day spas, and designed and manufactured a high-end product line for estheticians. She sold those businesses in 2004 and 2009. She worked as a realtor and a licensed esthetician. On August 25, 2025, Seaman resigned from her role as councilmember to begin a position working for the Trump administration. On September 17, 2025, the Las Vegas City Council appointed Kara Kelly to represent Ward 2 as Interim Councilmember when the seat was vacated by Seaman.

== Nevada Assembly (2014–2016) ==
Seaman represented Clark County's District 34 in the Nevada State Assembly for a single term, from 2014 to 2016. She was the first Republican Latina elected to the body. During her term, Seaman was the assistant majority party Whip (South). She was also the vice chair of the Assembly Commerce and Labor Committee, and additionally served on both the Judiciary Committee and the Legislative Operations and Elections Committee.

In her 2014 election, Seaman campaigned against raising taxes. As a member of the assembly, she voted against the commerce tax and the education initiative.

In early March 2015, Seaman voted for a school construction bond issue supported by Nevada Governor Brian Sandoval and introduced by Senate Republicans. Seaman was removed in December 2014 from the Taxation Committee by Assembly Speaker Designate John Hambrick because she opposed Governor Sandoval's tax plan.

In 2016 Seaman co-sponsored a bill, AB-386 to crack down on squatting.

== 2016 State Senate campaign ==
Seaman did not seek re-election to the Nevada State Assembly in 2016. Instead, Seaman was the 2016 Republican nominee for District 6 of the Nevada Senate. Seaman defeated Assemblyman Erv Nelson in the primary on an anti-tax platform. On November 8, 2016, Democrat Nicole Cannizzaro defeated Seaman in the general election, 51 percent to 49 percent.

== 2018 Congressional election ==
Seaman entered the race for Nevada's 3rd Congressional District in August 2017, but withdrew in March 2018 after a family friend, Danny Tarkanian, entered the race.

== Las Vegas City Council (2019–2025) ==
In mid-2019, Seaman began serving as the 2nd ward member on the Las Vegas City Council. She first won election in a special election held on June 11, 2019, being elected to a term ending in 2021. A special election was called when Councilman Steve Seroka resigned before finishing his term in office. A bill passed by the Nevada Legislature re-scheduling Nevada city elections from odd-years to even election years resulted in this term being extended to 2022. In 2022, she won re-election to another four-year term.

In 2024, Seaman unsuccessfully ran for mayor of Las Vegas. She conceded after losing to former U.S. congresswoman Shelley Berkley in a runoff election. In August 2025, she resigned from the Las Vegas City Council after being appointed as the regional director of the U.S. Department of Health and Human Services in Denver.

== Electoral history ==
General election for Las Vegas Mayor 2024
Party	Candidate	Votes	%
Nonpartisan	Shelley Berkeley	133,520	53.2%
Nonpartisan	Victoria Seaman	117,390	46.8%
Total votes		250,910	100.0%

Special general election for Las Vegas City Council Ward 2
Party	Candidate	Votes	%
Nonpartisan	Victoria Seaman	2,984	39.6%
Nonpartisan	Hilarie Grey	2,358	31.3%
Nonpartisan	Valerie Weber	1,238	16.4%
Nonpartisan	Richard Plaster	464	6.2%
Nonpartisan	Patsy Brown	259	3.4%
Nonpartisan	Bruce Feher	125	1.7%
Nonpartisan	Derrick Penney	58	.8%
Nonpartisan	Michael Tomko	54	.7%
Total votes		7,540	100.0%

NV State Senate 06 Race - Nov 08, 2016
Party	Candidate	Votes	%
Democratic	Nicole Cannizzaro	28,733	50.92%
Republican	Victoria Seaman	27,697	49.08%
Total votes		56,430	100.0%

NV State Senate 06 - R Primary Race Jun 14, 2016
Party	Candidate	Votes	%
Republican	Victoria Seaman	3,894	62.79%
Republican	Erv Nelson	2,308	37.21%
Total votes		6,202	100.0%

Nevada State Assembly 34 Race – Nov 4, 2014
Party	Candidate	Votes	%
Republican	Victoria Seaman	6,840	56.23%
Democratic	Meghan Smith	5,324	43.77%
Total votes		12,164	100.0%

== See also ==
- 2014 Nevada elections
- 2016 Nevada elections
- 2018 Nevada elections
