= Oscar Goodman =

American lawyer and politician (born 1939)

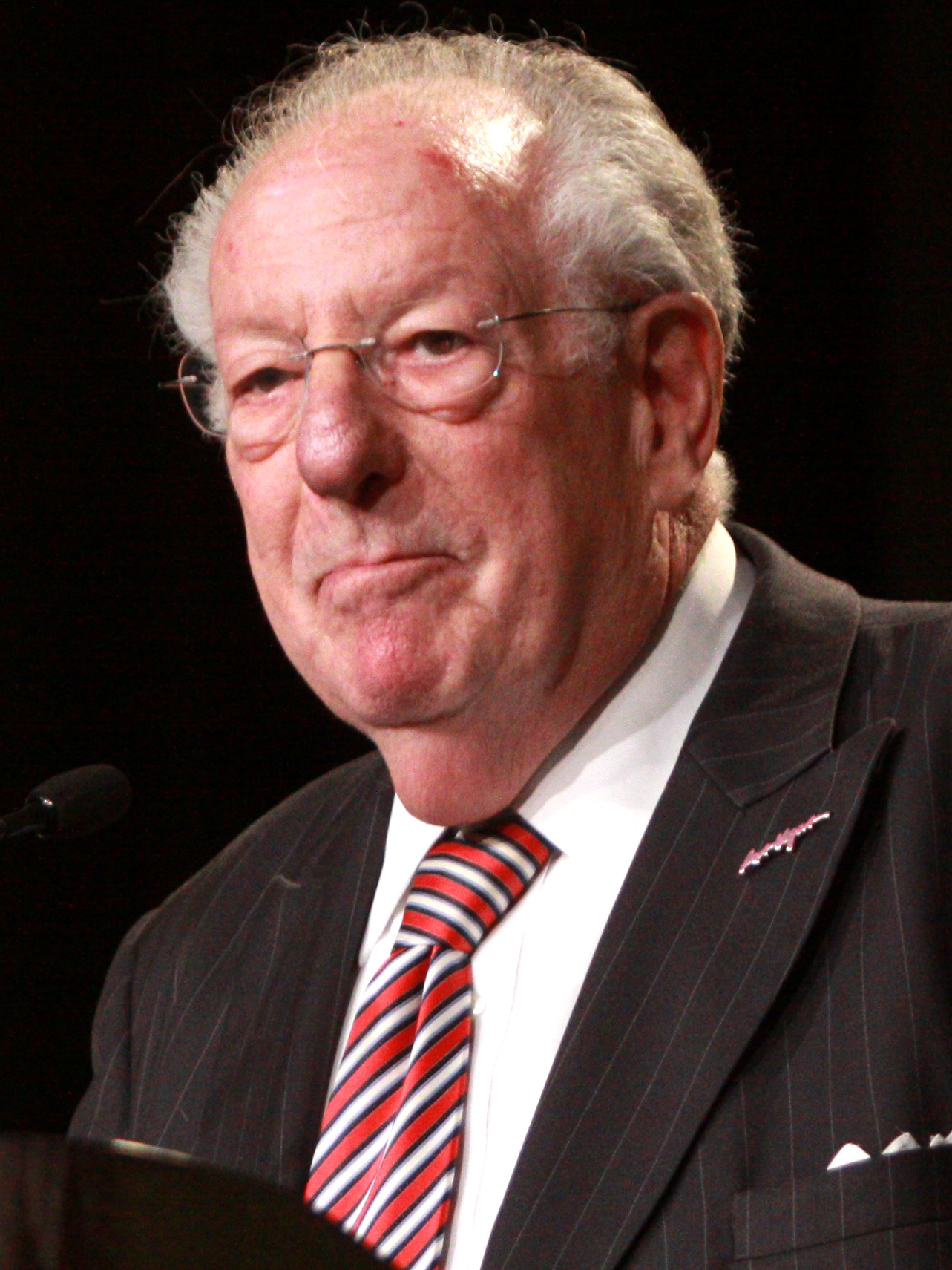

21st Mayor of Las Vegas
- In office June 8, 1999 – July 6, 2011
- Preceded by: Jan Laverty Jones
- Succeeded by: Carolyn Goodman

First Gentleman of Las Vegas
- In role July 6, 2011 – December 4, 2024
- Mayor: Carolyn Goodman
- Preceded by: Carolyn Goodman (as First Lady)
- Succeeded by: Lawrence Lehner

Personal details
- Born: Oscar Baylin Goodman; July 26, 1939 (age 87) Philadelphia, Pennsylvania, U.S.
- Party: Independent (2009–present)
- Other political affiliations: Democratic (1989–2009)
- Spouse: Carolyn Goldmark (m. 1962)
- Children: 4, including Ross
- Education: Haverford College (BA); University of Pennsylvania (JD)
- Profession: Attorney, politician

Oscar Baylin Goodman (born July 26, 1939) is an American attorney and politician. A Democrat-turned-independent, Goodman was the mayor of Las Vegas, Nevada from 1999 to 2011. His wife, Carolyn Goodman, succeeded him as mayor in 2011.

== Early life and education ==
Goodman was born and raised in a Jewish family in Philadelphia. After attending Central High School for a time, he graduated from The Haverford School. He graduated from Haverford College in 1961, then received his J.D. degree from the University of Pennsylvania Law School in 1964. He and his wife Carolyn have four children.

== Career ==
=== Defense attorney ===
During his career as a defense attorney, Goodman represented defendants accused of being some of the leading organized crime figures in Las Vegas, such as: Meyer Lansky, Nicky Scarfo, Herbert "Fat Herbie" Blitzstein, Phil Leonetti, former Stardust Casino boss Frank "Lefty" Rosenthal, and Jamiel "Jimmy" Chagra, a 1970s drug trafficker who was acquitted of ordering the murder of Federal Judge John H. Wood, Jr. One of his notorious clients was Chicago mobster Anthony "Tony the Ant" Spilotro, who was known to have a short and violent temper. In the semi-factual 1995 movie Casino, the character of Nicky Santoro was based on Spilotro, and was portrayed by actor Joe Pesci. Goodman had a cameo appearance in the film as himself, where he was depicted defending “Ace Rothstein,” a character closely based on Lefty Rosenthal, and played by Robert De Niro.

Goodman also represented former San Diego Mayor Roger Hedgecock, who was convicted of accepting illegal campaign contributions, and eventually forced to resign. Hedgecock was later cleared of all charges on appeal. Goodman was a senior partner in the law firm of Goodman & Chesnoff.

=== Civil service ===
In 1964, Goodman and his wife became active in the local Jewish federation soon after they moved to Las Vegas. Carolyn eventually served as head of the federation's women's divisions.

Through the years of 1980–81, he served as president of the National Association of Criminal Defense Lawyers. Goodman was also a member of the Las Vegas Convention and Visitors Authority.

== Mayor of Las Vegas (1999–2011) ==
=== Elections ===
On June 8, 1999, Goodman was elected mayor of Las Vegas after he received 63.76% (32,765) of the votes, while his opponent, then-Las Vegas City Councilman Arnie Adamsen, received 36.24% (18,620). In 2003, Goodman was re-elected to a second four-year term, and defeated five opponents after he received 85.72% (29,356) of the votes. On April 3, 2007, he was re-elected to a third and final term, with 83.69% (26,845) of the votes, and once again defeated five opponents. Despite having been called Las Vegas’ “most popular mayor,” the city has term limit laws that restrict mayors to a maximum of three terms. In 2011, Carolyn Goodman was elected to succeed her husband as mayor, after she earned 60% of the votes.

=== Tenure ===
On June 28, 1999, Goodman was the first mayor of Las Vegas to have his image placed on $5 and $25 casino chips issued by a Las Vegas casino. The two chips were issued by the Four Queens Hotel and Casino in Downtown Las Vegas. In 2006, the Four Queens put out a $200 Silver Strike with the likeness of Goodman on it.

Goodman has been vocal about having a Major League Baseball team relocate to Las Vegas. In 2004, the city failed to secure a move by the Montreal Expos to the city. Instead, the team relocated to Washington, D.C., and became the Washington Nationals. Later that year, Goodman met with officials of the Florida Marlins. The Chicago White Sox had considered a move, but negotiations failed after Chicago officials provided incentives for the team to stay.

Goodman worked to get a National Football League team to relocate to Las Vegas. On April 24, 2006, he called the San Diego Chargers, and asked if they would be interested in moving. Because of a contract, the city could not talk about a possible move. On January 4, 2007, he called again, since the team was not allowed to talk to other cities about a possible move. Again, Goodman was turned down “for the time being.” According to Mark Fabiani, the Chargers’ general counsel, Goodman was a longtime season ticket holder of the Chargers, and a fan of the team. The Chargers ultimately decided to relocate to Los Angeles instead. In 2017, under the tenure of Carolyn Goodman as mayor, the Oakland Raiders agreed to relocate to Las Vegas.

In 2003, Goodman was voted the “Least Effective Public Official” in the Review-Journal's annual reader's poll.

In July 2006 Goodman criticized the Ubisoft game Tom Clancy's Rainbow Six: Vegas for its premise of terrorism in Las Vegas, because he thought it might tarnish the city's image. He stated, "It's based on a false premise.... It could be harmful economically, and it may be something that's not entitled to free speech (protection).... I will ask... whether or not we can stop it." In 2009 and 2010, Goodman was angered by President Barack Obama's allegedly negative remarks about Las Vegas.

Currently, prostitution is legal in Nevada only in rural counties with fewer than 400,000 residents, a requirement which excludes Clark County and the city of Las Vegas from allowing the practice. Goodman supports legalizing prostitution in the city's downtown area as a revenue generator and tool for revitalization.

== Post-mayoral career ==
Goodman currently serves as Of Counsel to Goodman Law Group, a Las Vegas law firm formed by his son, Ross C. Goodman.

His memoir, Being Oscar: From Mob Lawyer to Mayor of Las Vegas, written with George Anastasia, was published in 2013.

=== Speculation of candidacies for other offices ===
Goodman had entertained the idea of seeking the Democratic nomination in the 2006 United States Senate election in Nevada, in order to run against incumbent Republican Senator John Ensign. He ultimately announced that he would not run for the nomination, which went to Jack Carter, the son of President Jimmy Carter.

Goodman fueled speculation that he might run as an independent in the 2010 Nevada gubernatorial election against incumbent Republican Jim Gibbons and presumptive Democratic candidate Rory Reid. However, Goodman decided not to run for governor, citing his desire to stay close to his family, and objections to moving to Carson City.

Las Vegas commentator Dayvid Figler wrote in 2009 that Goodman might become the first Jewish president of the United States.

== In popular culture ==
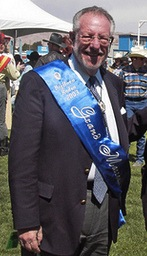
Oscar Goodman in 2003

Goodman appeared as himself in the 1995 Martin Scorsese film Casino, reprising his real life role as a lawyer for both Frank Rosenthal and Anthony Spilotro, respectively renamed Sam Rothstein (Robert De Niro) and Nicky Santoro (Joe Pesci). Later on, he made another brief appearance in the film Looney Tunes: Back in Action in the DVD extras. In 2006, he appeared as himself in the Direct-to-DVD film Bachelor Party Vegas.

In 2000, a bobblehead doll of Goodman was issued as a promotion during a Las Vegas 51s baseball game.

As a celebrity photographer for the Playboy Cyber Club, Goodman shot a topless pictorial of Miss January 2001 Irina Voronina for the website.

In 2002, Goodman became a spokesman for Bombay Sapphire gin. He donated his $100,000 salary to charity, including $50,000 to The Meadows School founded by his wife. He would later generate controversy in 2005 when he joked about his love of the gin before an elementary school class.

In 2003, Las Vegas Review-Journal columnist John L. Smith wrote a book chronicling Goodman's life, titled Of Rats and Men: Oscar Goodman's Life from Mob Mouthpiece to Mayor of Las Vegas.

Goodman guest-starred as himself three times on the CBS series CSI: Crime Scene Investigation. The episodes Goodman was featured in included: "Early Rollout", as a lawyer for a suspect during an interrogation; "Sqweegel", where he defended Ann-Margret's character from being harassed by the LVPD; and "Maid Man", where he was shot while emceeing the opening of the Mob Museum, which was re-created for the show in advance of its opening.

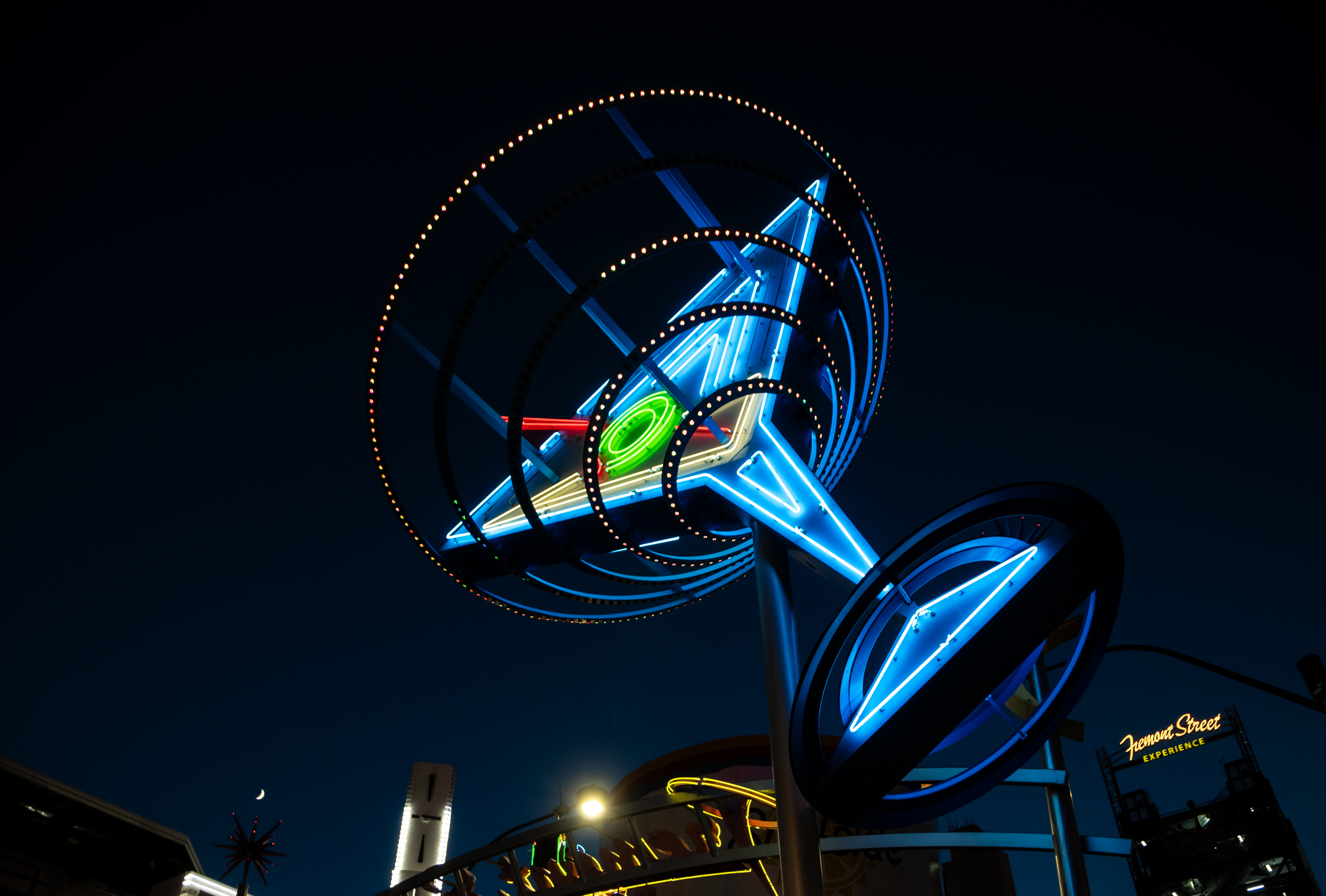
Oscar's Martini on Fremont Street, Las Vegas

Goodman also guest-starred as himself in several episodes of NBC comedy-drama Las Vegas.

In 2007, the Las Vegas Redevelopment Agency commissioned the creation of a 21 foot high neon martini, designed by Selbert Perkins Design (built by Fluoresco Lighting and Signs on Fremont Street). The martini was named for Oscar Goodman, and is colloquially referred to as "Oscar's Martini" in his honor.

Goodman was interviewed for the television programs The Making of the Mob: New York and The Making of the Mob: Chicago in 2015 and 2016, respectively.

== Bibliography ==
- Being Oscar: From Mob Lawyer to Mayor of Las Vegas (2013)

== See also ==
- List of mayors of Las Vegas, Nevada

== Notes ==
Political offices
Preceded by Jan Laverty Jones	Mayor of Las Vegas; 1999–2011	Succeeded by Carolyn Goodman
Honorary titles
Preceded by Carolyn Goodman as First Lady	First Gentleman of Las Vegas; 2011–2024	Succeeded by Lawrence Lehner
