= Killian's Angels =

- Origin: Las Vegas, Nevada, U.S.
- Genres: All-female Rock
- Years active: 2001–present
- Members: Beth Mullaney; Anne Donohue; Ginger Bruner; Marlo Zemartis; Nannette Fortier

Killian's Angels is an all-female Celtic-influenced band based in Las Vegas, Nevada. Since its start in 2001 the band has recorded two CDs and won national radio honors with King World and Oink Inc., which recognized the band's own interpretation of the Jeopardy! theme song. The band appears on the soundtrack of the video game Grand Theft Auto IV; their song "The Celtic High Step" is played at a New York beer garden within the game. The same recording is featured in the premiere episode of CBS's Elementary.

The band name comes from Killian's Irish Red lager. Their music style includes rock, folk, country, R&B and pop, all with a Celtic accent.

== Band members ==
Current band members include Beth Mullaney, Nannette Fortier, Ginger Bruner, Marlo Zemartis and Anne Donohue. Founding band members are Beth Mullaney, Ginger Bruner, Nanette Fortier, Satomi Hofmann, Lisa Viscuglia and Dolly Coulter. Former band members include Satomi Hofmann, Willy Wainwright and Vita Corimbi. Featured guests include Adrienne LeFebvre, Brett Barnes, CJ Borden, Al Guzman, Mark Pardy, Rachel Julian Richele Panther.

The band's diverse instrumentation includes violin, tuba, mandolin, tin whistle, guitar, keyboard, harmonica, drums, bodhran, spoons, bass, Irish tenor banjo, melodica and more.

Beth Mullaney is the band's founder, leader, and lead vocalist. Her arsenal of instruments include guitar, mandolin, harmonica, spoons, Irish tenor banjo and drums. Founding member Ginger Bruner plays bass guitar, tuba, and sings. Former founding member Satomi Hofmann, who appears on both Killian's Angels CDs, played guitars, and piano, as well as alternating lead vocals with Mullaney and Coulter. Nannette Fortier has performed drums, percussion, piano, guitar, and tin whistle with Killian's Angels since 2003.

Violinist Adrienne LeFebvre appeared as a regular guest musician, usually as Viscuglia's substitute, but occasionally with both musicians together. CJ Borden, who does vocals, keyboard, and percussion, has been appearing as a guest with the band since 2004.

Ginger Bruner, besides playing tuba for Killian's Angels and other bands, is a photographer, recording engineer, and has been a DJ and announcer for KUNV, Nevada Public Radio, for over 20 years. Her other band of note was punk polka "goofcore" band, Tippy Elvis featuring Ginger on the tuba with an odd assortment of lunatics including accordion wielding cartoonist, Sean Jones, and demented attorney/poet Dayvid Figler on vocals. In August 2006 she was inducted into the Nevada Broadcasters Association Hall of Fame.

== Albums ==
- Killian's Angels, CD, self-released March 17, 2003.
- The Ladies Room, CD, self-released March 17, 2004.
- Kilian’s Angels: Anthology - Best of Kilian’s Angels with new, additional tracks , CD, self-released December 10, 2025.
