= Shelley Berkley =

American politician and attorney (born 1951)

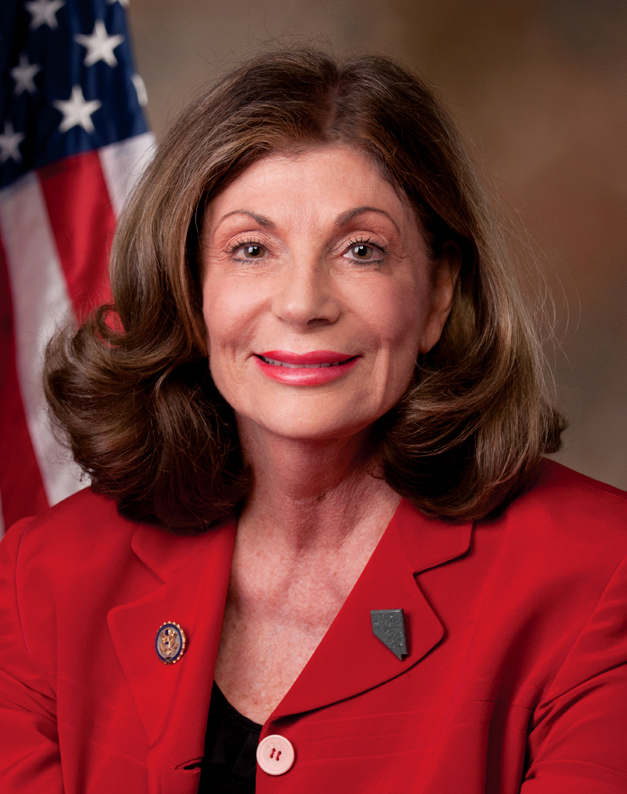
- Official portrait, 2012

23rd Mayor of Las Vegas
- Incumbent
- Assumed office December 4, 2024
- Preceded by: Carolyn Goodman

Member of the U.S. House of Representatives from Nevada's 1st district
- In office January 3, 1999 – January 3, 2013
- Preceded by: John Ensign
- Succeeded by: Dina Titus

Personal details
- Born: Rochelle Levine; January 20, 1951 (age 75) New York City, New York, U.S.
- Party: Democratic
- Spouse: Lawrence Lehner (m. 1999)
- Children: 2
- Education: University of Nevada, Las Vegas (BA); University of San Diego (JD)

Shelley Berkley (née Rochelle Levine; born January 20, 1951) is an American businesswoman, politician and attorney who has served as mayor of Las Vegas since 2024. A member of the Democratic Party, she was a member of the United States House of Representatives representing Nevada's 1st congressional district for six terms from 1999 until 2013.

Previously, Berkley served as member of Nevada Assembly from 1983 to 1985 and as a member of the Board of Regents of the Nevada System of Higher Education from 1990 to 1998.

Between serving in Congress and being elected mayor of Las Vegas, Berkley held leadership roles at both the Nevada campus and the California campus of the Touro University System.

== Early life, education, and legal career ==
Rochelle Levine was born in New York City on January 20, 1951, the daughter of Estelle (née Colonomos and George Levine. Her paternal grandparents were Russian Jews and her mother's family were Sephardic Jews from Ottoman-era Thessaloniki, now in Macedonia, northern Greece.

Berkley moved with her family to Las Vegas, Nevada in 1964 when she was a junior high school student, attending Fremont Junior High and Valley High School. After completing high school, she became the first member of her family to attend college when she enrolled as an undergraduate at the University of Nevada, Las Vegas. She became a member of Delta Zeta sorority. Elected student body president of the Consolidated Students of the University of Nevada, Las Vegas her senior year, Shelley graduated with honors in 1972, earning a B.A. in political science.

After obtaining her J.D. degree in 1976 from the University of San Diego School of Law, Shelley returned to Las Vegas and began her professional career. Berkley practiced law for several years, mainly as a member of the legal counsel for several Las Vegas casinos. She also served as the national director for the American Hotel-Motel Association.

== Early career ==
=== Nevada Assembly (1982–84) ===
Berkley served in the Nevada Assembly from 1982 to 1984 and was involved in civic affairs locally.

=== Nevada University and Community College System Board of Regents (1990–1998) ===
Berkley served on the Nevada System of Higher Education Board of Regents from 1990 to 1998. During her tenure, she was appointed to serve as the board's vice chair.

=== Private sector work ===
In the 1990s, Berkley was privately employed by Las Vegas Sands as a government affairs advisor. In 1996 and 1997, during the construction of The Venetian, Berkley advised this employer to make campaign contributions to two Clark County commissioners and two Clark County judges to secure their approval for the new hotel. She advised her employer that they would benefit from making campaign contributions to the two judges because those judges "tend to help those who helped them." She also briefed her employer that they had the option of currying political favor by hiring an uncle of County Commissioner Erin Kenny and to grant a daiquiri concession to commission chairwoman Yvonne Atkinson Gates.

== U.S. House of Representatives (1999–2013) ==
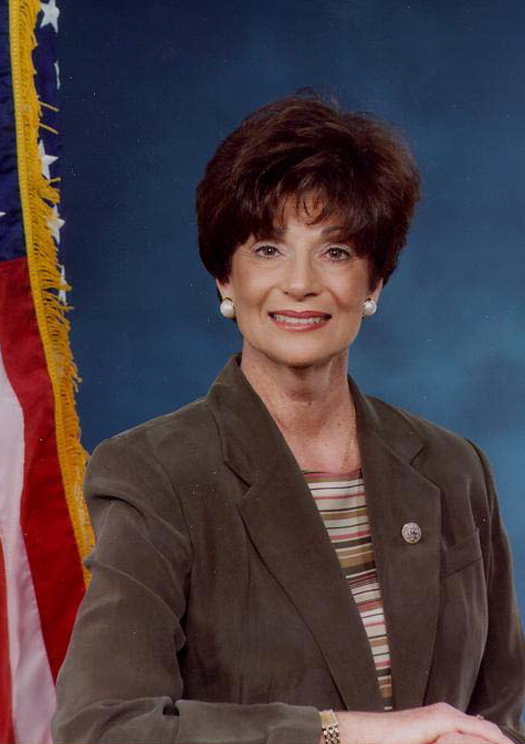
108th United States Congress

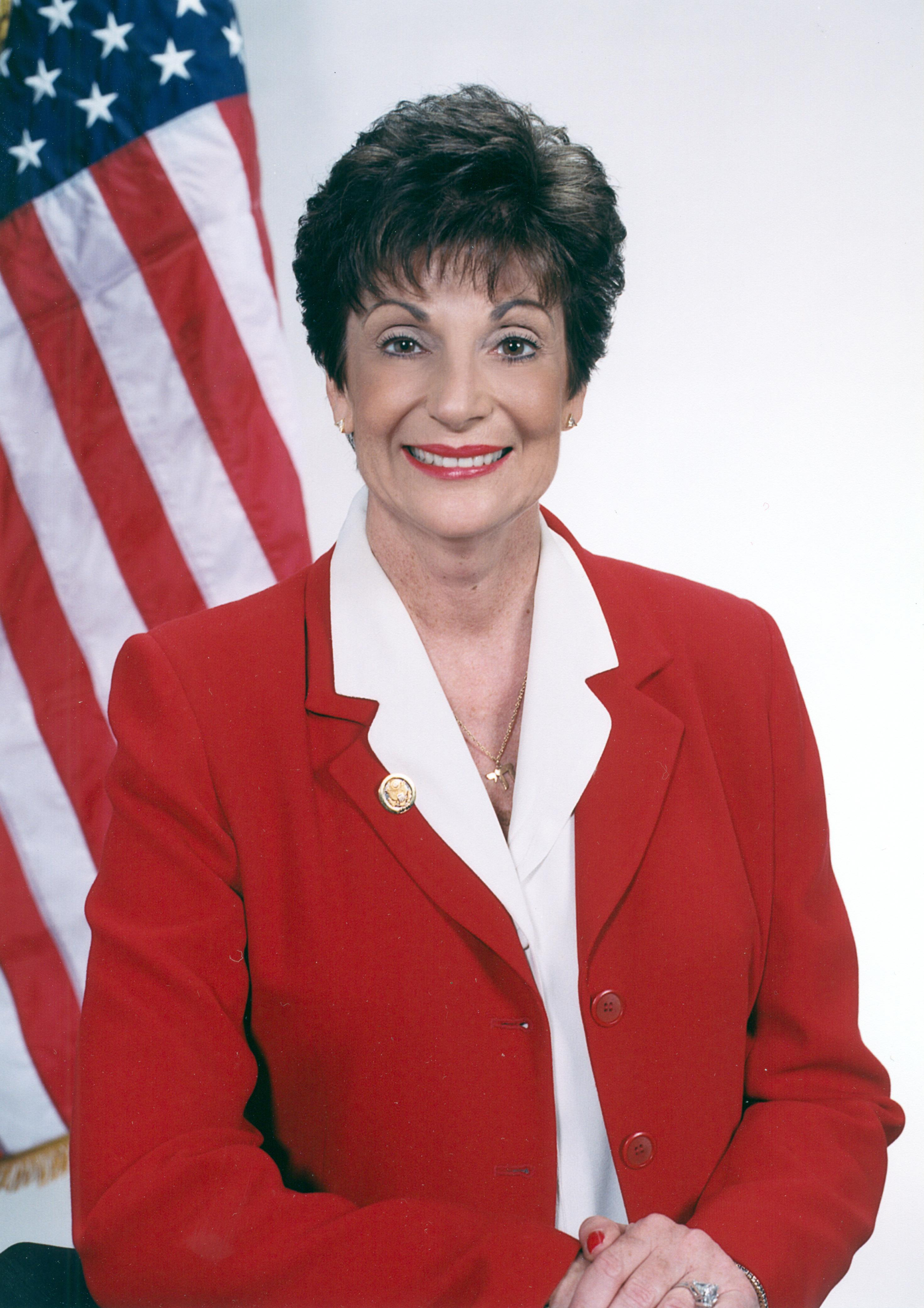
109th United States Congress

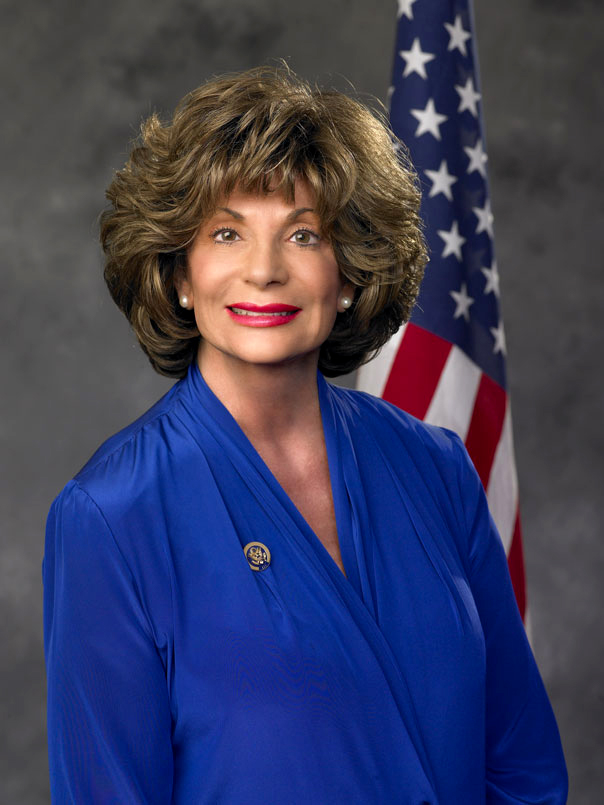
112th United States Congress

Berkley represented Nevada's 1st congressional district from 1999 to 2013, serving seven terms as a member of the U.S. House of Representatives. The district represented most of the city of Las Vegas as well as the Las Vegas Strip and the city of North Las Vegas. She was the second woman elected to Congress from Nevada (after only Barbara Vucanovich), the first to do so as a Democratic Party nominee, as well as the first woman elected to represent the 1st district.

In Congress, Berkley was a member of the New Democrat Coalition. She views her top priorities as affordable health care coverage for all Americans, veteran's rights and alternative energy. Berkley is also strongly opposed to the building of a nuclear waste repository in Yucca Mountain, Nevada.

=== Campaigns ===
In 1996, U.S. Congressman John Ensign won re-election in Nevada's 1st congressional district with 50.1% of the vote, a 6.6% margin over Bob Coffin, the Democratic candidate. The day after, Berkley filed papers to run in the district. She raised $206,000 in the first six months and $410,000 in the next six months. Berkley was Democrats' dream candidate, as she easily won the primary with 81.5% of the vote. Ensign decided to retire in order to run against U.S. Senator Harry Reid in the very close and competitive 1998 senate election. In the general election, she defeated Republican Don Chairez, a District Court Judge in Clark County with 49.2% of the vote.

In 2000, she won re-election with 51.7% against State Senator Jon Porter. In 2002, she defeated Republican Las Vegas City Councilwoman Lynette Boggs with 53.7%.

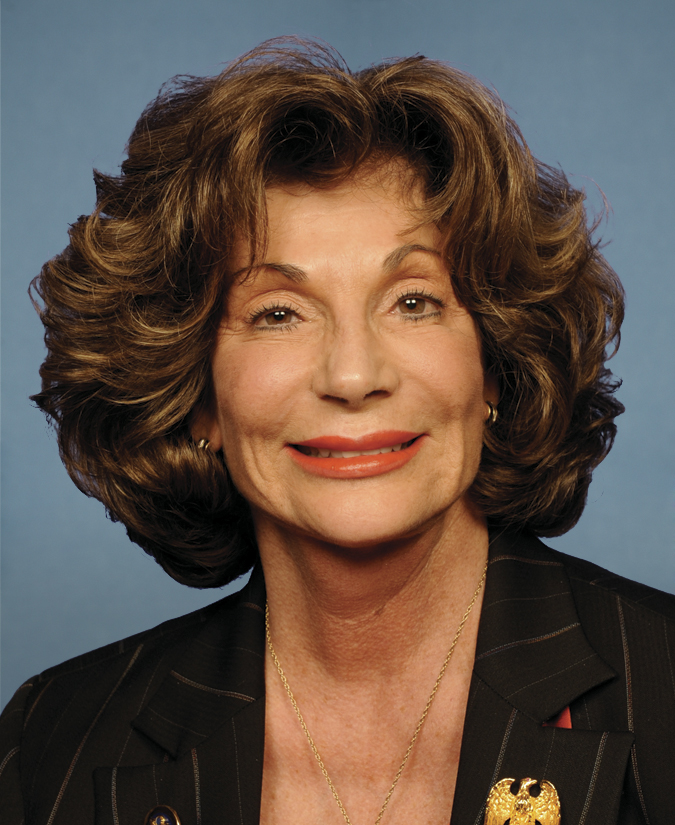
Congressional portrait of Berkley

Berkley announced in June 2012 that she would turn over all $11,900 in campaign contributions from indicted lobbyist Harvey Whittemore to the U.S. Treasury. Whittemore was charged with violating campaign finance laws and misleading law enforcement. Before pledging to give up the contributions from Whittemore, Berkley had said that she was holding his contributions in escrow while awaiting the outcome of the investigation against him.

As a 6th term congresswoman, Berkley was endorsed by a number of advocacy groups. The themes of some groups endorsing Berkley included education, environmental protections, and gender equality in politics. Berkley received endorsements from groups such as The National Education Association, The Sierra Club and The National Women's Political Caucus.

=== Committee assignments ===
- Committee on Ways and Means
  - Subcommittee on Social Security
  - Subcommittee on Select Revenue Measures

=== Tenure and votes ===
In 2011, Berkley voted for the National Defense Authorization Act for Fiscal Year 2012 as part of a controversial provision that allows the government and the military to indefinitely detain American citizens and others without trial.

Berkley was given various scores from a variety of advocacy groups dedicated to various topics (ranging from abortion issues, agriculture, criminal issues, animal rights, budget and taxes and foreign aid). NARAL Pro-Choice America gave Berkley a 100% in 2010, while the National Right to Life Committee gave her a 0% rating. The American Farm Bureau Federation gave Berkley a 33% rating in 2010 the topic of agriculture, while the National Farm Workers Union gave Berkley a 100% rating. Other interest groups Berkley has received High ratings from Citizens United for Rehabilitation of Errants, and Defenders of Wildlife Fund. Groups that Berkley has received poor ratings from include the National Taxpayers Union and Peace Action.

==== Domestic matters ====
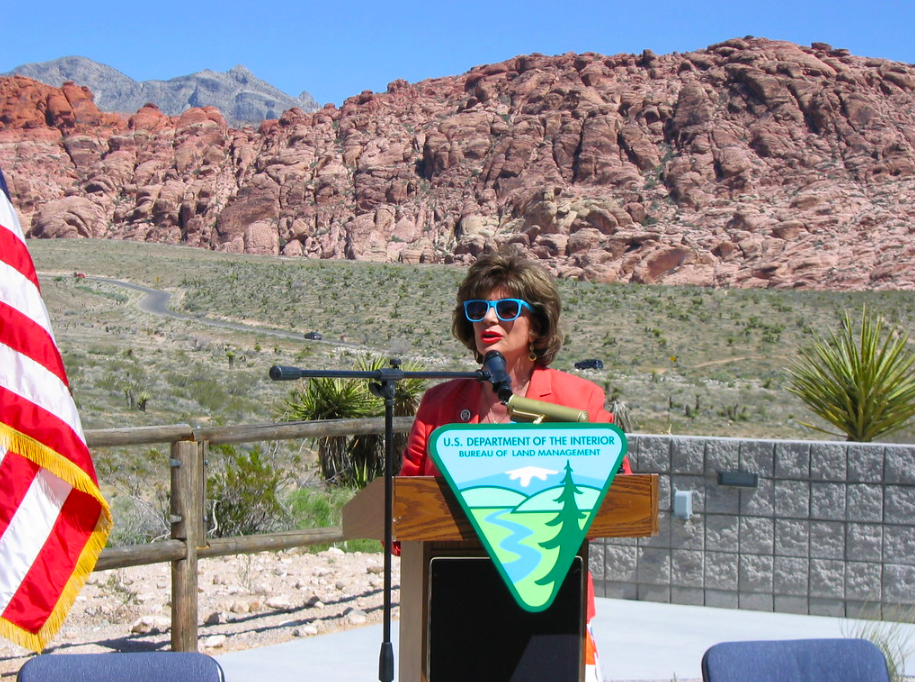
Berkley speaking at the Red Rock Canyon Visitors Center Grand opening

On October 3, 2008, Berkley voted for the Emergency Economic Stabilization Act of 2008, which created the Troubled Asset Relief Program (TARP) that bailed out Wall Street banks. On June 26, 2009, Berkley voted for the American Clean Energy and Security Act, which would have implemented a cap-and-trade system similar to the regulations proposed by the Reagan administration in the 1980s, then known as "emissions trading." Berkley voted for the Patient Protection and Affordable Care Act of 2010.

==== Foreign policy ====
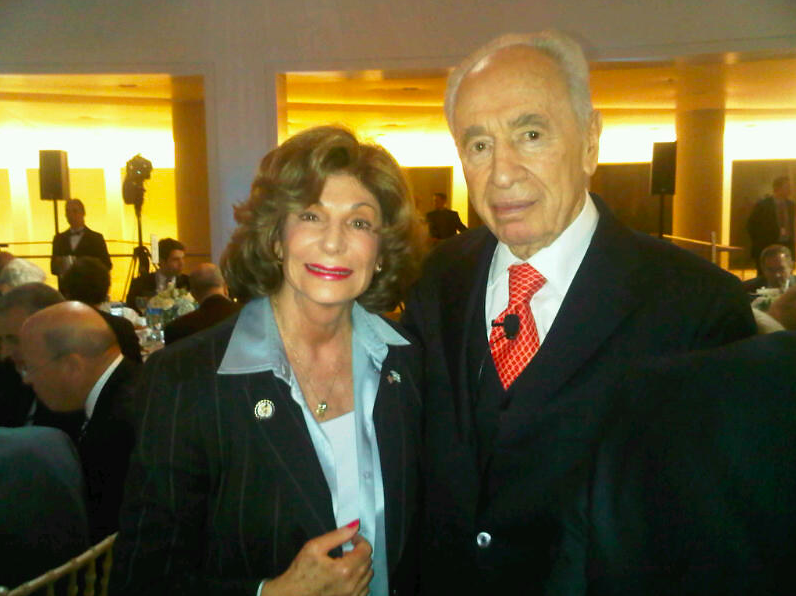
Berkley with Israeli President Shimon Peres in 2011

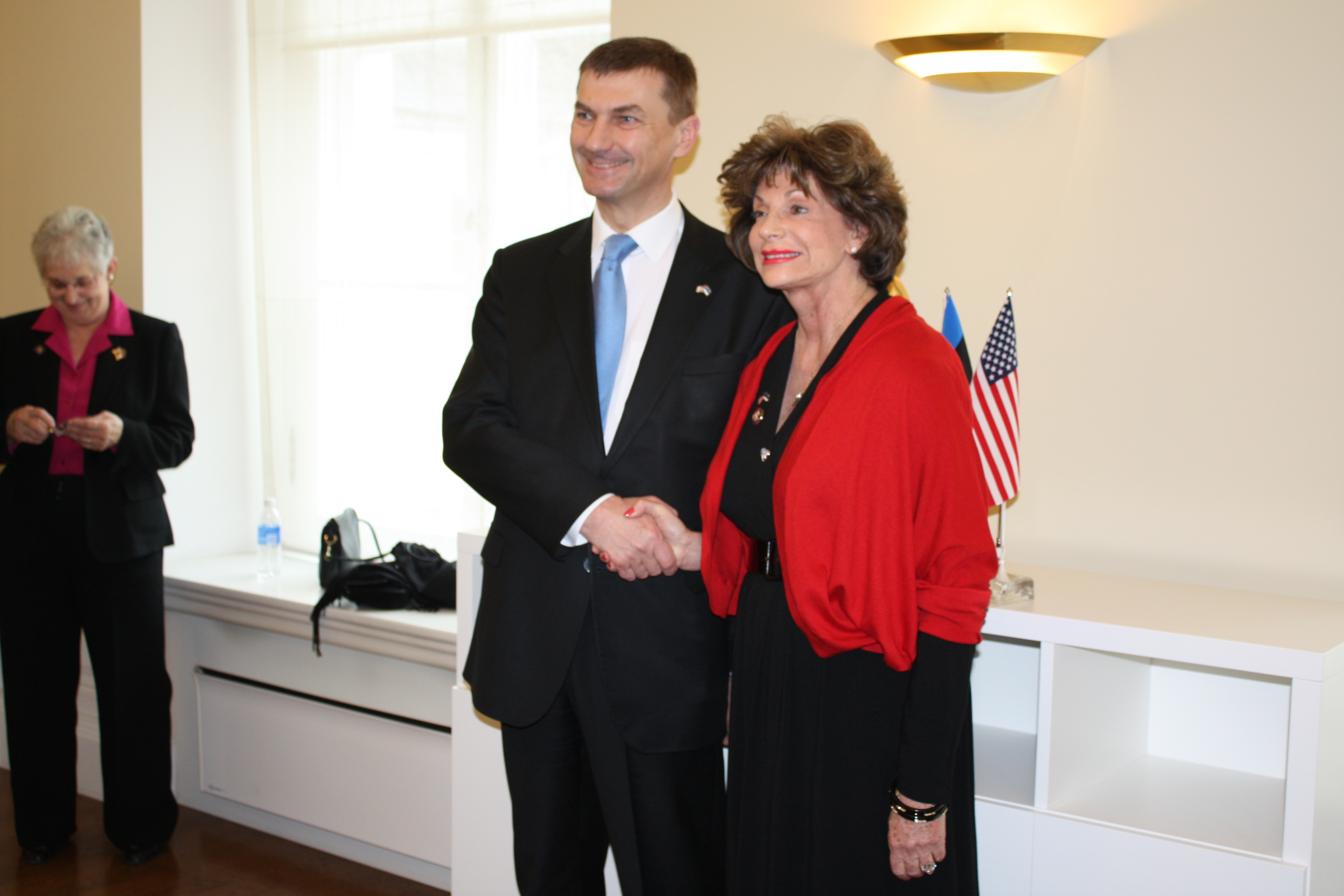
Berkley poses with Estonian Prime Minister Andrus Ansip in 2009 while visiting Estonia as part of a congressional delegation

Berkley is a supporter of Israel and is a member of the pro-Israel group American Israel Public Affairs Committee. On October 10, 2002, Berkley was among the 81 House Democrats who voted in favor of authorizing the invasion of Iraq.

=== Ethics investigation and related criticism ===
On September 5, 2011, a New York Times exposé detailed the actions that Berkley took as a member of Congress that she and her husband financially benefited from. The Times noted that, "Ms. Berkley's actions were among a series over the last five years in which she pushed legislation or twisted the arms of federal regulators to pursue an agenda that is aligned with the business interests of her husband, Dr. Larry Lehrner."

On September 19, 2011, the ethics watchdog Citizens for Responsibility and Ethics in Washington (CREW) released their annual Most Corrupt Members of Congress report. The report listed Berkley in the "Dishonorable Mention" category. Berkley was named in CREW's Most Corrupt Members of Congress report for the second year in a row in 2012.

On July 9, 2012, the United States House Committee on Ethics voted unanimously to form an investigative subcommittee to see whether Berkley used her official position to advocate for policy that benefited her family's financial situation. More specifically, Berkley is accused of pushing healthcare legislation that would benefit her husband's medical practice. Berkley was also blamed for her efforts to block the closure of a kidney transplant center where her husband was employed.

== 2012 U.S. Senate campaign ==
Berkley announced that she would run for the United States Senate in April 2011 to succeed John Ensign, who resigned amidst an ethics scandal. She secured the Democratic nomination in the June primary and faced incumbent gubernatorial-appointed senator Dean Heller in the November general election. She narrowly lost the election to Heller 46% to 45%.

By July 2012, Berkley had raised $4 million in contributions for her campaign to unseat the Heller, while Heller had raised $4.4 million.

== Touro University System roles (2014–2023) ==
In 2014, Berkley was hired as CEO and senior provost for both the Nevada campus and the California campus of the Touro University System. She was later promoted to senior vice president of these two campuses. She retired from her positions in 2023 after launching her candidacy in the 2024 Las Vegas mayoral election.

== Mayor of Las Vegas (2024–present) ==
Berkley ran for mayor of Las Vegas in 2024. She announced her plans to run for the office in January 2023. Berkley placed first in the initial round of the nonpartisan election (held in June 2024), receiving 35.7% of the vote. City Councilmember Victoria Seaman received 28.9% City councilmember Cedric Crear received 18.9%, with the remaining 6.45% of the vote being split between eleven other candidates. Since no candidate received a majority, a runoff was held in which Berkley faced Seaman (a Republican who was an incumbent member of the Las Vegas City Council and a former one-term Nevada Assembly member). Berkley won the November runoff, receiving 53.2% of the vote. She was sworn-in as mayor on December 4.

== Personal life ==
In March 1999, Berkley married Lawrence Lehrner, a practicing nephrologist in Las Vegas. Both Berkley and Lehrner have two children from prior marriages. Berkley has said about her husband, "He works about 12 hours a day, seven days a week. I call him a doctor's doctor." While he seldom campaigned with Berkley, Lehrner's medical practice received attention due to the House Ethics Committee's investigation into Berkley's efforts to save a kidney transplant center in which her husband has a financial interest; Laura Meyers of the Las Vegas Review-Journal wrote, "Having Lehrner on the campaign trail with Berkley could remind voters of the ethics investigation—expose him to uncomfortable questions."

== See also ==
- List of Jewish members of the United States Congress
- Women in the United States House of Representatives

U.S. House of Representatives
Preceded by John Ensign	Member of the U.S. House of Representatives from Nevada's 1st congressional district 1999–2013	Succeeded by Dina Titus
Party political offices
Preceded by Jack Carter	Democratic nominee for U.S. Senator from Nevada (Class 1); 2012	Succeeded by Jacky Rosen
Political offices
Preceded by Carolyn Goodman	Mayor of Las Vegas; 2024–present	Incumbent
U.S. order of precedence (ceremonial)
Preceded by Kurt Schrader as Former U.S. Representative	Order of precedence of the United States as Former U.S. Representative	Succeeded by Dave Reichert as Former U.S. Representative
