= 2003 Las Vegas mayoral election =

- April 8, 2003
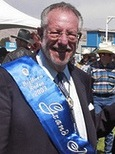

Candidate	Oscar Goodman	Tom McGowan
Popular vote	29,356	1,951
Percentage	85.72%	5.70%
Mayor before election
Oscar Goodman
Elected Mayor
Oscar Goodman

The 2003 Las Vegas mayoral election took place on April 8, 2003, to elect the mayor of Las Vegas, Nevada. The election was held concurrently with various other local elections, and was officially nonpartisan.

Incumbent Mayor Oscar Goodman was reelected. With Goodman winning a majority in the initial round of the election, no runoff was needed.

== Candidates ==
Incumbent Las Vegas mayor Oscar Goodman was first elected in the 1999 election. He made redevelopment of downtown Las Vegas a priority in his first term. During that time, the city acquired 61 acres of property which Goodman envisioned for redevelopment. The site, later known as Symphony Park, inspired Goodman to seek re-election: "That 61 acres is really my vision and the primary reason why I ran again. The seeds that have been planted in the first term, I want to see them start to bud."

Goodman filed his candidacy on January 28, 2003. He faced opposition from five little-known rivals, who acknowledged an uphill battle against him. Nevertheless, Goodman launched a full campaign, stating: "I never take anything for granted. I don't want to be the one who loses a race because I didn't do something it takes to win one." His campaign raised more than $1 million, while his rivals raised and spent less than $7,000 combined. In the two weeks before the election, Goodman had endorsements from numerous organizations whereas his opponents had none.

Goodman viewed homelessness as an obstruction to downtown redevelopment, and was criticized for his stance on the issue, deemed by some as too harsh. He also received criticism for inviting mob associate Joey Cusumano to a party earlier in 2003. Cusumano was in the state's Black Book. Goodman, a criminal defense attorney known for his representation of mob figures, previously said that he had only professional relationships with such people.

Among those challenging Goodman was Tom McGowan, who previously ran in the 1999 election. McGowan said, "I believe we need a change for the better. I am not running against Oscar Goodman; I am running against the general public, a public that is satisfied with notoriety or notoriety by association by a man who has identified himself as a mob mouthpiece." Edward R. Schmitt, a plumbing contractor and mayoral candidate, expressed his dislike of Goodman as well: "He hasn't done anything for the city. The whole downtown is still dead."

Another candidate was Allan "Big Al" Smith, who wore a campaign costume made from his ex-wife's coat. His proposals included a Golden Gate Bridge replica and an 18-story mixed-use building housing grocery stores and a shopping mall, as well as office and residential space. Other candidates included Joe Falco, a car salesman; and Carlos "Mazunga" Poliak, a sanitation worker who had made several failed runs for local office.

== Election results ==
Awareness and interest in the election was low among the general public. Early voting began on March 22, 2003, and the election was held on April 8, 2003. Voter turnout was 18 percent of the registered population. Goodman won with nearly 86 percent of the vote, a record surpassing Jan Jones' 72-percent victory in the 1995 mayoral election. Goodman said he would continue to focus on downtown redevelopment, hoping to attract a medical center to Symphony Park. The Lou Ruvo Center for Brain Health eventually started construction there in 2007.

Results
Candidate	Votes	%
Oscar Goodman (incumbent)	29,356	85.72
Tom McGowan	1,951	5.70
Joe Falco	1,020	2.98
Edward R. Schmitt	1,004	2.93
Allan "Big Al" Smith	763	2.23
C. "Mazunga" Poliak	476	1.48
Total votes	34,245	
