= Peter Buol =

American politician in Nevada

Member of the Nevada Senate
- In office 1915–1918
- In office 1913–1914

1st Mayor of Las Vegas
- In office June 1911 – May 1913
- Preceded by: Office established
- Succeeded by: William L. Hawkins

Personal details
- Born: October 1, 1873 Chicago, Illinois, U.S.
- Died: February 11, 1939 (aged 65) Los Angeles, California, U.S.
- Cause of death: Stroke
- Resting place: Inglewood Park Cemetery, Inglewood, California, U.S.
- Party: Republican
- Spouse: Lorena V. (nee Patterson) Buol
- Parent: Frank Buol (father)
- Relatives: Dorothy Elizabeth Buol (daughter)
- Occupation: Politician
- Known for: First mayor of Las Vegas, Nevada

Peter Buol (October 1, 1873 – February 11, 1939) was an American politician. He was the first mayor of Las Vegas, Nevada from 1911 to 1913. He was a member of the Republican Party.

== Early life ==
In 1873, Buol was born in Chicago, Illinois. Buol's father was Frank Buol and his mother was Emma Buol, Swiss immigrants. Buol grew up in Chicago and in Bayfield County, Wisconsin.

== Career ==
Buol was initially trained under his father as a chef. In 1901, he joined his father in Hollywood, though by 1904 he had arrived in Las Vegas. Buol soon became involved in the mining, real estate, and artesian water industries. His own efforts and his ability to inspire others to invest in Las Vegas helped increase the speed of its development in the early 1900s.

Buol won the first election for mayor of Las Vegas by ten votes. His term lasted from June 1911 until May 1913. Buol was then elected to represent Clark County at the Nevada State Assembly for a two-year term (1913–14), followed by a four-year term to represent Clark County at the Nevada State Senate (1915–18).

== Personal life ==
On September 24, 1900, Buol married Lorena V. Patterson. Buol's adopted daughter is Dorothy Elizabeth Buol.

In 1913, Buol and his wife built their own home at North Seventh Street and Ogden Avenue in Las Vegas, Nevada.

In 1925, Buol and his family moved to Los Angeles, California. After suffering a stroke in 1937, Buol died there on February 11, 1939, at the age of 65.

== Bibliography ==
- Hopkins, A. D. "Peter Buol: The Promoter." In The First 100: Portraits of the Men and Women Who Shaped Las Vegas. Las Vegas: Huntington Press, 1999. http://www.1st100.com/part1/buol.html
- Carroll, MaryLou. "Born in the U.S.A. Peter Buol: Entrepreneur and public servant." Passages/Passagen 41 (Fall 2006):50-1.

Preceded by Office established	Mayor of Las Vegas; 1911–1913	Succeeded by William L. Hawkins
