= Consolidated Students of the University of Nevada, Las Vegas =

The Consolidated Students of the University of Nevada-Las Vegas, often abbreviated CSUN or UNLV CSUN, is the student body government at the University of Nevada, Las Vegas. It is a body funded by student fees and serves to represent the students needs on campus at the University of Nevada, Las Vegas. The UNLV CSUN offices are located on the third floor of the University of Nevada, Las Vegas Student Union.

== Executive board ==
The Executive Board of the Consolidated Students of the University of Nevada, Las Vegas consists of the President, Vice President, Senate President, Vice President Pro Tempore, Senate President Pro Tempore, and various directors. The various directors have their own duties and answer directly to the Vice President. The Senate President organizes and runs senate meetings as well as acts as a manager for the senate with the power to dismiss.

== Senate ==
The Consolidated Students of the University of Nevada, Las Vegas Senate consists of 25 members representing each of the nine colleges at the University of Nevada, Las Vegas. Historically, the UNLV CSUN Senate meets weekly during the fall and spring semesters and biweekly during the summer semester. However, ultimately, the Senate President holds supreme power in deciding how to schedule meetings. Senators hold their position for a one year term beginning with the first Senate meeting in November in which they are sworn in.

=== Senate committees ===
The Consolidated Students of the University of Nevada, Las Vegas has 4 Senate Committees including Ways and Means, University Initiatives, Scholarships and Grants, and Internal Affairs.

== Judicial Council ==
The Judicial Council of the Consolidated Students of the University of Nevada, Las Vegas serves as body that helps maintain the balance of power throughout UNLV CSUN. They apply the UNLV CSUN constitution and bylaws to any case presented to them. They are led by the Chief Justice.

== Relationship to student clubs and organizations ==
The Consolidated Students of the University of Nevada, Las Vegas sometimes sponsors and offers funding for student organizations and clubs unless otherwise dictated by the politics of Senate. However, funding may vary depending on the fiscal views of the Senate. More than 8% of CSUN's budget goes to fund the student newspaper, The Rebel Yell.

== Notable past members ==
- U.S. Rep. Shelley Berkley (Former Student Body President)
