= 2019 Las Vegas mayoral election =

- April 2, 2019
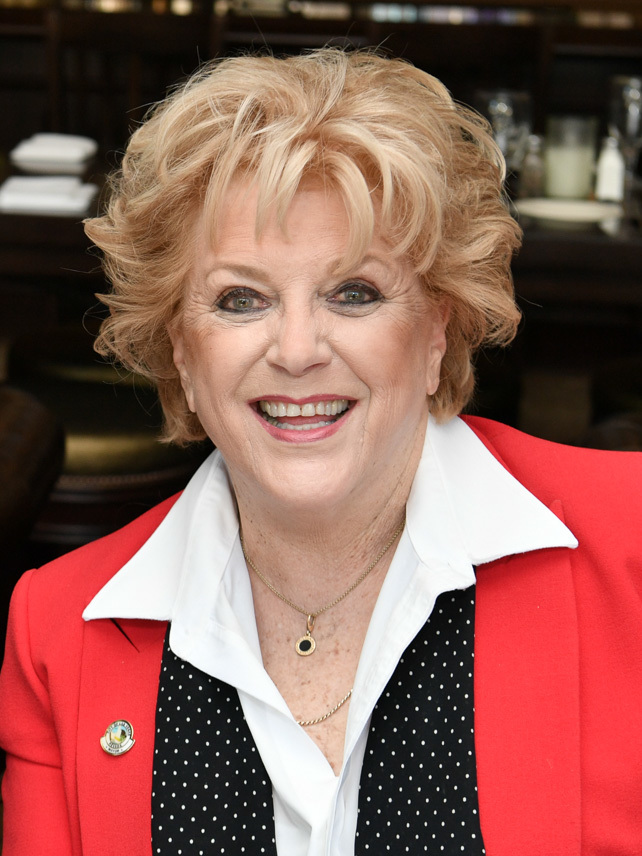

Candidate	Carolyn Goodman	Phil Collins
Popular vote	22,316	1,417
Percentage	83.51%	5.30%
- Precinct results Goodman: 50–60% 60–70% 70–80% 80–90% >90% No data
Mayor before election
Carolyn Goodman
Elected Mayor
Carolyn Goodman

The 2019 Las Vegas mayoral election took place on April 2, 2019, to elect the Mayor of Las Vegas, Nevada. The election was held concurrently with various other local elections, and was officially nonpartisan. Goodman's main opponent was Republican Phil Collins.

Incumbent Mayor Carolyn Goodman, an Independent in office since 2011, was reelected to a third term in office. With Goodman winning a majority in the initial round of the election, no runoff was needed.

Due to a state law adopted in 2019, this was the last regularly scheduled Las Vegas mayoral election to be conducted in an off-year.

== Results ==
Results
Candidate	Votes	%
Carolyn Goodman (incumbent)	22,316	83.51%
Phil Collins	1,417	5.30%
Amy Luciano	824	3.08%
Tina Rané Alexander	786	2.94%
Mack Miller	616	2.31%
Vance "Stretch" Sanders	529	1.98%
Zachary Krueger	235	0.88%
Total votes	26,723	100.00%
