= Harmon Percy Marble =

American politician and photographer

13th Mayor of Las Vegas
- In office 1938–1939
- Preceded by: Leonard L. Arnett
- Succeeded by: John L. Russell

Personal details
- Born: Harmon Percival Marble; November 5, 1870 Table Rock, Nebraska, U.S.
- Died: February 3, 1945 (aged 74) Las Vegas, Nevada, U.S.
- Party: Democratic
- Profession: Journalist and politician

Harmon Percival Marble (November 5, 1870 – February 3, 1945) was an American journalist and politician. He was the mayor of Las Vegas from 1938 to 1939 and was a photographer of Native Americans. He was a member of the Democratic Party.

== Career ==
=== Indian Service ===
As a young adult, he worked for a number of years in the newspaper business, founding his own paper, the Humboldt Leader (probably Humboldt, Nebraska), in 1897. In 1911, he sold the paper in order to join the Indian Service. He was first assigned to the Navajo Reservation in Arizona, then in 1913 to the Menominee Indian Reservation in Wisconsin, followed by work with the Sioux tribes at Fort Thompson, South Dakota. Later, he was in charge of the Southern Pueblos in Albuquerque, New Mexico, and finally returned to Arizona.

=== Las Vegas ===
In 1926, he retired from the Indian Service and moved to Long Beach, California, where he owned a cigar store. Later, he joined family in Las Vegas, Nevada and lived out his remaining years there. He was a prominent civic leader and mayor of Las Vegas, and was instrumental in establishing the first low-income family housing development in the city, which was renamed "Marble Manor" in his honor after his death in 1945.

=== Photography ===
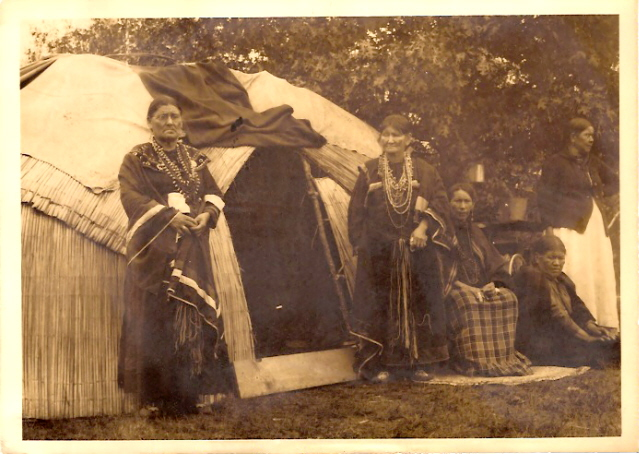
Marble photograph taken on the Menominee Reservation between 1913 and 1918

Marble is known as a prolific photographer of Native Americans. During his government career, he took advantage of opportunities afforded by his positions to take hundreds of photographs of the Navajo, Menominee and Sioux tribes. His photographs were inconsistently exposed, often poorly composed and poorly printed. However, this lack of artistic sense rendered photos which offer an unvarnished portraiture of the indigenous population more so than better known images captured by contemporaries the likes of Edward Curtis and Rodman Wanamaker.

Political offices
Preceded by Leonard L. Arnett	Mayor of Las Vegas; 1938–1939	Succeeded by John L. Russell
