= Cedric Crear =

American politician and businessman

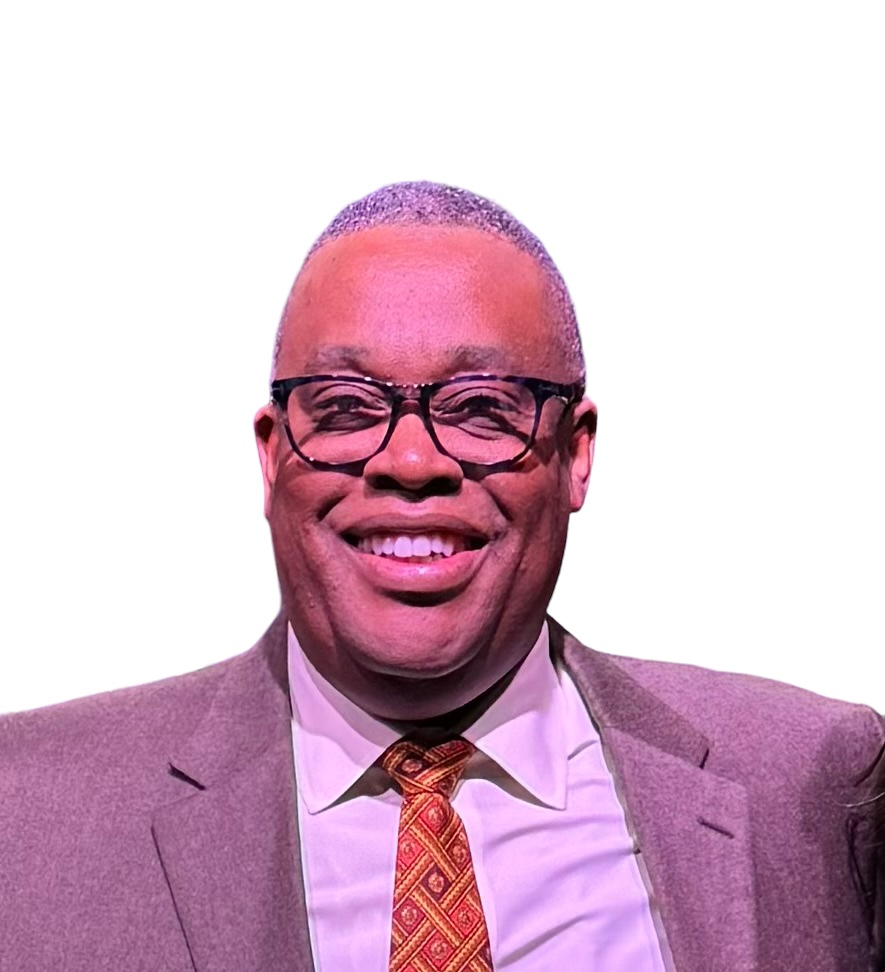
- Crear in 2023

Member of the Las Vegas City Council from the 5th ward
- In office 2018–2024
- Preceded by: Ricki Barlow

Commissioner, City of Las Vegas Planning Commission
- In office 2015–2018

Personal details
- Born: 1969 (age 56–57) Las Vegas, Nevada, U.S.
- Party: Democratic
- Spouse: Keiba Crear
- Children: 2
- Education: Bishop Gorman High School
- Alma mater: Howard University (BS)
- Occupation: Politician, businessman
- Website: https://cedriccrear.com

Cedric Crear is an American politician, businessman, and community leader, currently serving as a member of the Las Vegas City Council, representing Ward 5. A member of the Democratic Party, he was an unsuccessful candidate for Mayor of Las Vegas in the June 2024 primary election.

== Early life and education ==
Cedric Crear was born in 1969 to John and Barbara Crear and raised in Las Vegas, Nevada. His father John Crear was the second African-American doctor registered in the state. He graduated from Bishop Gorman High School in 1987, where he excelled in tennis, achieving an undefeated record and winning four state championship titles. He then attended Howard University in Washington, D.C., on a tennis scholarship. He was captain of the team for three years and a two-time conference champion, graduating in 1992.

== Business career ==
Prior to his political career, Crear founded Crear Creative Group, a full-service marketing, advertising, and consulting firm, in 2006. He also established Crear Outdoor Advertising. Before that, Crear was a sales and marketing executive for Station Casinos from 1997 to 2002.

He is a partner in business ventures including Shaq’s Big Chicken restaurants in Las Vegas and in Memphis.

Since 2021, Crear has been a member of the Board of Directors of Lexicon Bank.

== Political career ==
Crear served on the Board of Regents for the Nevada System of Higher Education from 2007 to 2018. He was first elected in 2006, and was re-elected in 2012 as the representative for District 1 in Clark County. He served as chair of the Cultural Diversity and Title IX Compliance Committee and vice chair of the Business, Finance and Facilities and Investment committees.

Before his tenure on the city council, Crear was appointed to the City of Las Vegas Planning Commission in 2015, and served until 2018.

Crear has served on numerous non-profit and civic boards, including The Smith Center for the Performing Arts, the Southern Nevada Chapter of the American Red Cross, the Southern Nevada Regional Housing Authority, the National Black Caucus of Local Elected Officials, and the Andre Agassi Charitable Association.

=== Las Vegas City Council ===
Crear represents Ward 5, of which he is a lifelong resident, on the Las Vegas City Council. He won the March 27, 2018, special election to complete the council term of his predecessor, Ricki Barlow, which ended in 2019. He then won re-election to a full four-year term in the April 2019 election.

One of Crear's key initiatives while on the council has been implementation of The HUNDRED (Historic Urban Neighborhood Design Redevelopment) Plan, a community-led approach to revitalizing the Historic Westside community of Las Vegas.

== Personal life ==
Crear is married to Keiba Crear, and they have two daughters. The family resides in Crear's historic childhood home in West Las Vegas.
