= Phil Collins (politician) =

American politician (born 1967)

Chair of the Prohibition Party
- In office March 28, 2020 – 2023
- Preceded by: Randy McNutt
- Succeeded by: Zack Kusnir

Member of the Libertyville Township Board of Trustees
- In office May 2013 – January 2016

Personal details
- Born: March 8, 1967 (age 59) Point Mugu, California, U.S.
- Party: Prohibition
- Other political affiliations: Republican
- Spouse: Nicole Macaluso
- Education: University of Arkansas (B.A.)

Military service
- Allegiance: United States
- Branch/service: United States Navy

Philip Andrew Collins (born March 8, 1967) is an American politician and perennial candidate who was the Prohibition Party's presidential nominee for the 2020 presidential election. Collins has been active in local politics in California, Illinois, Nevada, and Wisconsin.

== Early life ==
Philip Andrew Collins was born on March 8, 1967, at Naval Construction Battalion Center Port Hueneme, California, where his father was stationed. In 1985, he graduated from Siloam Springs High School and later received a Bachelor of Arts in political science from the University of Arkansas. Collins served in the United States Navy and was a hospital corpsman.

== Career ==
=== Local politics ===
During the 2012 and 2014 House of Representatives elections Collins ran as a write-in candidate in the seventh and ninth congressional districts. During the 2012 Republican Party presidential primaries he supported former Louisiana Governor Buddy Roemer and ran as a pro-Roemer delegate in the primary.

From May 2013 to January 2016, he served as a Libertyville Township trustee and while living in Illinois served as the chairman of the Illinois Prohibition party. In 2017, he ran for a position on the Harper College Board of Trustees and placed second in the election for two seats, but declined to take office, since he had moved to Las Vegas, Nevada, after the last day to file a withdrawal of candidacy.

On June 12, 2018, he won the Republican nomination for Clark County treasurer against Ron Q. Quiland, but was defeated in the general election by Laura Fitzpatrick. He later ran in Las Vegas' 2019 mayoral election where he came in second place.

=== Presidential ===
On April 14, 2019, he was given the Prohibition Party's vice presidential nomination after initially losing the presidential nomination to Connie Gammon, who was the original 2020 vice presidential nominee after Bill Bayes withdrew from the presidential nomination. On August 24, 2019, he was given the Prohibition Party's presidential nomination to replace Connie Gammon after Gammon withdrew due to health problems. Afterward he announced that he would also run in the American Independent Party's presidential primary in California and his name was included on the American Independent primary list.

On March 3, 2020, he won the American Independent primary in California. However, the American Independent Party elected to give its presidential nomination to Rocky De La Fuente and its vice presidential nomination to Kanye West.

=== Wisconsin State Assembly ===
Collins ran for the GOP nomination for 88th district of the Wisconsin State Assembly in 2024, calling for reduced taxes, a ban on abortion and a law requiring election officials to use printed obituaries to cull voter roles. He lost to Benjamin Franklin (R) who earned 4,608 votes (67.9%) to Collins' (R) 2,181 votes (32.1%).

== Personal life ==
Collins is a Lutheran Christian, being a communicant of the Orthodox Lutheran Confessional Conference.

== Electoral history ==
Phil Collins electoral history

2012 Illinois Seventh Congressional district election
Party	Candidate	Votes	%	±%
Democratic	Danny K. Davis (incumbent)	242,439	84.64%	+3.13%
Republican	Rita Zak	31,466	10.99%	−5.10%
Independent	John H. Monaghan	12,523	4.37%	+4.37%
Independent	Phil Collins (write-in)	5	0.00%	+0.00%
Socialist Workers	Dennis Richter (write-in)	2	0.00%	+0.00%
Total votes		286,435	100.00%	

2014 Illinois Ninth Congressional district election
Party	Candidate	Votes	%	±%
Democratic	Jan Schakowsky (incumbent)	141,000	66.06%	−0.27%
Republican	Susanne Atanus	72,384	33.91%	+0.24%
Independent	Phil Collins (write-in)	66	0.03%	+0.03%
Total votes		213,450	100.00%	

2017 Harper College Board of Trustee election
Party	Candidate	Votes	%
Nonpartisan	Pat Stack (incumbent)	21,478	42.87%
Nonpartisan	Phil Collins	15,764	31.47%
Nonpartisan	Walt Mundt (incumbent)	12,855	25.66%
Total votes		50,097	100.00%

2018 Clark County Treasurer Republican primary
Party	Candidate	Votes	%
Republican	Phil Collins	50,380	82.85%
Republican	Ron Q. Quilang	10,431	17.15%
Total votes		60,811	100.00%

2018 Clark County Treasurer election
Party	Candidate	Votes	%	±%
Democratic	Laura Fitzpatrick (incumbent)	367,732	57.73%	+1.52%
Republican	Phil Collins	269,294	42.27%	−1.52%
Total votes		637,026	100.00%	

2019 Las Vegas mayoral election
Party	Candidate	Votes	%
Nonpartisan	Carolyn Goodman (incumbent)	22,316	83.51%
Nonpartisan	Phil Collins	1,417	5.30%
Nonpartisan	Amy Luciano	824	3.08%
Nonpartisan	Tina Rané Alexander	786	2.94%
Nonpartisan	Mack Miller	616	2.31%
Nonpartisan	Vance Sanders	529	1.98%
Nonpartisan	Zachary Krueger	235	0.88%
Total votes		26,723	100.00%

2020 California American Independent presidential primary (Note: While Phil Collins won the American Independent primary, Rocky De La Fuente received the party nomination for the 2020 general election.)
Party	Candidate	Votes	%
American Independent	Phil Collins	18,461	32.64%
American Independent	Roque "Rocky" De La Fuente	12,816	22.66%
American Independent	Don Blankenship	10,377	18.34%
American Independent	J.R. Myers	8,068	14.26%
American Independent	Charles Kraut	6,846	12.10%
Total votes		56,568	100.00%

2021 Oshkosh Common Council nonpartisan spring primary
Party	Candidate	Votes	%
Nonpartisan	Aaron Wojciechowski	1,568	17.49%
Nonpartisan	Jake Krause	1,461	16.30%
Nonpartisan	Michael G. Beardsley	1,295	14.45%
Nonpartisan	Bill Miller	1,274	14.21%
Nonpartisan	Courtney N. Hansen	1,165	13.00%
Nonpartisan	Phil Collins	791	8.83%
Nonpartisan	K. Noah Hinrichs	776	8.66%
Nonpartisan	Robert E. Wilcox	633	7.06%
Total votes		8,963	100.00%

== Notes ==
Party political offices
Preceded by James Hedges	Prohibition Party presidential nominee 2020	Succeeded by Most recent
