= Dayvid Figler =

American lawyer

Dayvid Figler (born August 18, 1967, Chicago, Illinois, United States) is an American performer, author and trial lawyer. He passed the Nevada bar exam at age 23. In 2003, he served a short term as a Las Vegas municipal court judge after being appointed by Mayor Oscar B. Goodman. He has become a regarded legal commentator, prolific radio commentator, and writer on a variety of topics related to Las Vegas.

== Background ==
Figler graduated from the University of the Pacific – McGeorge School of Law in 1991. At McGeorge he served as student body president. He started his career in his hometown of Las Vegas, where his family relocated in 1971. Raised in Las Vegas, his unique perspective as a so-called “Vegas kid” has produced numerous humor oriented anecdotes which have provided the fodder for hundreds of radio essays which have appeared on Las Vegas National Public Radio affiliate, KNPR, as well as NPR’s All Things Considered Program. In 2019, he was awarded the prestigious Medal of Justice honor from the Nevada State Bar. Since 2022, he has co-hosted the daily news podcast, City Cast Las Vegas.

Dayvid Figler also served as a congressional intern in Washington, D.C. for (eventual Senate Majority Leader) Harry M. Reid in 1987 and later completed an internship with the United States Attorney's office in Las Vegas. Eventually, Figler took an associate position with the Clark County Special Public Defender's office where he exclusively represented indigents charged with murder, including those facing the death penalty.

He has been cited and quoted as a noted legal expert in many places including the New York Times, National Public Radio, Newsweek, USA Today and the Los Angeles Times.

== High profile cases ==
=== Donte Johnson ===
Figler's first case of note was defending against the death penalty prosecution of Donte Johnson, a California gang member who directed the kidnapping and execution style murders of four young men in Las Vegas in 1998. The four young men were followers of the band, Phish, and the stated motive for their killing was an attempt to steal money the men had made on the road with Phish. At trial, evidence was presented that Johnson was responsible for a number of other murders and attempt murders. The jury, however, did not impose the death penalty after Figler's impassioned closing argument. Later, a 3-judge panel of judges imposed the death penalty. Arguing one of the first cases in the country in light of the U.S. Supreme Court's 2000 ruling in Apprendi v. New Jersey, Figler successfully advocated the landmark case and in a published opinion, the 3-judge death panels of Nevada were ruled unconstitutional and the Court vacated the imposition of the death penalty. JOHNSON V. STATE, 118 Nev. Adv. Op. No. 79 (12/18/02)

=== Gloria Guzman ===
As a lawyer, Figler was first showcased before a national audience on CourtTV (later TruTV) after the gavel-to-gavel coverage of the trial of Gloria Guzman in 2006. There, Guzman was a nurse caretaker who fell in love with and married one of her charges in a facility who was also a quadriplegic. The two moved out of the facility and into an apartment where they engaged in a destructive lifestyle involving methamphetamine and guns. When her husband drowned in a bathtub, Guzman was accused of first degree murder. Midtrial, Figler discovered that the police had falsified the transcript of her confession and a hasty plea bargain later the previously incarcerated Guzman was given credit for time served. This case marked the first of numerous appearances for Figler on the Nancy Grace program both as a guest and a commentator. The Nancy Grace appearances led to a number of guest appearances on other TruTV programs including Star Jones, Best Defense with Jami Floyd and Courtside with Ashley Banfield and Jack Ford where he primarily offered day-to-day coverage on O.J. Simpson's kidnapping trial.

=== Thad Aubert ===
While on its face an insignificant case of first degree case kidnapping and robbery with use a deadly weapon, it was during this trial that Figler and his frequent co-counsel, Daniel M. Bunin, brought to light a long-standing practice of the Clark County District Attorney's office of compensating witnesses for appearing in their private offices. Causing a controversy within the legal community that is ongoing, the footnote to the case is that Figler and Bunin were able to secure a full acquittal from the jury after only 15 minutes of deliberation. In the case of Gary Miller some four years later, the issue was raised again by Figler and Bunin, and again they secured a full acquittal of 20 felony counts of sexual assault. The District Attorney announced that after 20 years of doing it, they were ending this "inappropriate" practice.

== Radio, writing and arts ==
Beginning with the first of two Fellowships from the Nevada State Council for the Arts in 1997 for performance poetry (the other came in 2001 for fiction), Figler has embarked upon a creative life to run parallel with his law career. (He is the only multiple Fellowship winner in two distinct categories).

A popular Nevada (former) slam poet and travelling urban storyteller, Figler has toured the United States at many festivals and events as a featured performer. Most notably, since 1997, he has been featured at SxSW, Bumbershoot, North by Northwest, the National Poetry Slam competition, the Porchlight storytelling series in San Francisco, the Back Fence PDX storytelling series in Portland, Oregon, HEEB storytelling and the SF Sketchfest 2011 & 2012. In Nevada, he tours as part of the Tumblewords initiative through the Nevada Arts Council bringing literary events to rural Nevada towns. In 1998, he created a one-man show called "Dayvid Figler IS Jim Morrison in Hello I Love You, Where You Folks From?". In 2006, he was named Best Las Vegas Poet by the readers of LV CityLife weekly. In October 2010, Figler took his storytelling experiences further by producing Las Vegas' premier storytelling series, The Tell.

In 2000, he began as a featured commentator on radio station, KNPR in Las Vegas and his audio essays are archived under the banner "Ain't Necessarily So" on the station's website. A number of those commentaries were broadcast nationally on NPR's All Things Considered. In 2002, 2003 and then again in 2005, his essays were named Best Radio Program by the Electronic Media Awards, Las Vegas' primary broadcast media awards. In 2003, he was also named Best Radio Personality by reader's poll of the Las Vegas Review-Journal, Nevada's largest circulation daily paper. In 2013, the Vegas Valley Book Festival awarded the individual Crystal Bookmark Award to Figler for his lifelong contribution to the cause of literary awareness in Southern Nevada.

A frequent contributor to Las Vegas weekly and monthly magazines, his first national magazine article was the main feature for the Politics issue of Heeb (magazine), where he profiled (former) Las Vegas Mayor Oscar Goodman and he's since taken up writing legal creative non-fiction for nsfwcorp.

In 2005, Portland small press, Future Tense, published his short fictional work of humor, GROPE, about two Las Vegas natives finding a connection in a strip club. Figler is a contributor to Las Vegas guidebooks, including Time Out and also has stories or poems in a number of anthologies including In the Shadow of the Strip (University of Nevada Press), Literary Nevada (University of Nevada Press), The Perpetual Engine of Hope (CityLife Books) Poetry Slam (Manic D Press) and Nevada: 150 years in the Silver State (University of Nevada Press).

Rumors abound of a reunion of the seminal "goofcore" punk rock polka band, Tippy Elvis, where Figler served as lead vocalist and primary lyricist. Popular in Las Vegas in the mid-90s, the band did reunite for one show as a surprise to Figler on his 40th birthday and a second show in 2011 at the Artifice bar as part of the Neon Reverb Music Festival. During its heyday, Tippy Elvis was an opening act for Mojo Nixon, Boiled in Lead and Idiot Flesh.
