= The Meadows School =

Prep school in Las Vegas, Nevada, US

Location
- 8601 Scholar Lane; Las Vegas, Nevada 89128; USA; 36.1950°N 115.2826°W

Information
- Type: Independent
- Motto: "In Pursuit of Excellence"
- Established: 1984
- Head of School: Jay Berckley
- Grades: PreK-12
- Enrollment: 950 (as of 2022-23)
- Student to teacher ratio: 11:1
- Campus: Summerlin, 40 acres
- Colors: Blue; Silver
- Mascot: Mustangs
- Accreditation: NWAIS, NWAC
- Tuition: $$24,350 (Beginning School); $28,210 (Lower School); $31,030 (Middle School); $36,590 (Upper School)
- Website: themeadowsschool.org

The Meadows School is a non-profit, coeducational, nonsectarian, independent college preparatory day school located in the Summerlin area of Las Vegas, Nevada. The campus serves just over 950 students in preschool through grade twelve spread among four divisions – Beginning School (Preschool), Lower School (Grades K-5), Middle School (Grades 6-8), and Upper School (Grades 9-12).

The Meadows has an estimated enrollment of 950 students and over 150 faculty and staff, with an average student-to-faculty ratio of 11:1. On average, the Beginning School enrolls 90-100 students, the Lower School enrolls 60 students per grade level, and the Middle and Upper Schools enroll 65-80 students per grade level.

The Upper School offers students 24 AP courses and additional AT (Advanced Topics) classes. In 2016, The Washington Post named The Meadows School the #2 most challenging high school in Nevada, and the #97 most challenging private high school in the country. The Meadows School continually ranks #1 on Niche.com as the best private K-12 school and private high school in Nevada. Since its first Upper School Commencement in 1991, 100 percent of graduates from The Meadows School have been accepted into four-year colleges or universities.

== History ==
=== Meadows Lane temporary campus ===
At the time that The Meadows School opened in 1984, a permanent campus site had not yet been found. In lieu of a permanent location, Carolyn Goodman raised $300,000 and purchased 5,000 square feet of temporary modular buildings that were set up on a parking lot behind a car dealership. The lot was loaned to the School by Board Member Fletcher Jones, Jr. and was located, coincidentally, on Meadows Lane in northern Las Vegas. These buildings served as the School’s classrooms until the permanent campus was opened four years later.

=== Scholar Lane permanent campus ===
In 1985, Goodman was introduced to William Lummis, the nephew of Howard Hughes and the Chairman of the Board for the Summa Corporation (rebranded as the Howard Hughes Corporation in 1994). The Summa Corporation was in the early stages of developing the northwest area of Las Vegas, later known as Summerlin. Recognizing the correlation between strong communities and good schools, the Summa Corporation donated 40 acres of undeveloped land to the School for a permanent campus.

Construction on the new campus began in the fall of 1987. The permanent campus was situated on Scholar Lane, a street name chosen by the students for their new school. While the construction of the Summerlin campus was underway, the Summa Corporation also provided additional funding to the School to add new modular buildings to the temporary campus to accommodate its growing student enrollment, which by 1987 had increased to 200 students in grades K-8.

One year later, at the beginning of the 1988 school year, Lower School students moved into The LeOre Cobbley Lower School building on the new campus. Middle and Upper School students followed suit in December of that year and moved into classrooms created from the previous modular buildings on Meadows Lane, which had been relocated to the permanent campus.

== Athletics ==
=== Interscholastic sports ===
The Meadows School is a member of the Nevada Interscholastic Activities Association (NIAA) Southern conference and participates in athletics at the Division 3A level. It offers students a variety of interscholastic sports to choose from, including football, soccer, volleyball, cheer, tennis, and cross country in the fall season; basketball, cheer, wrestling, and bowling in the winter season; and baseball, softball, track & field, and golf in the spring season.

The Meadows School also offers many of the same interscholastic sports at the Middle School level as a member of the NCSAA league.

Several sports are offered at the Lower School level as part of the Meadows After-School Programs.
