= Carolyn Goodman =

American politician from Nevada (born 1939)

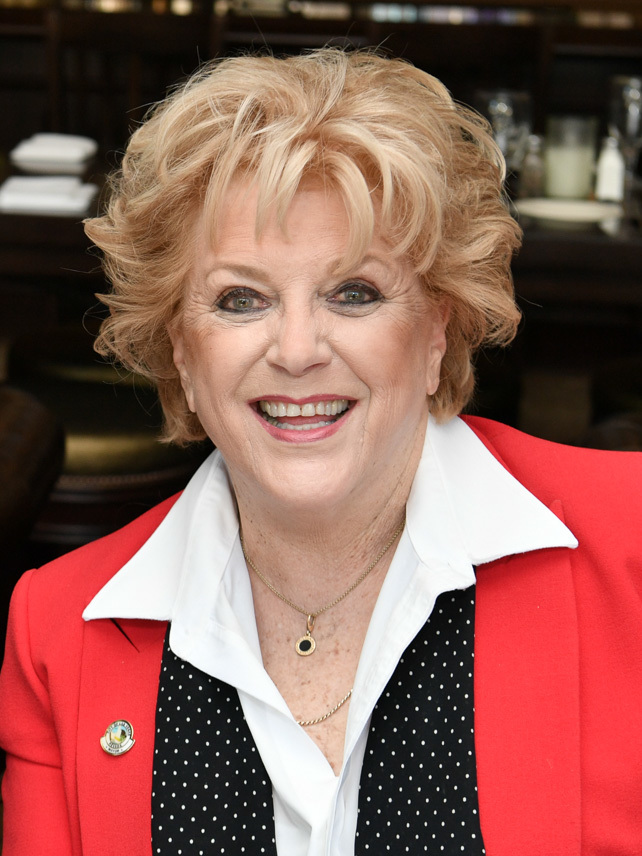
- Goodman in 2018

22nd Mayor of Las Vegas
- In office July 6, 2011 – December 4, 2024
- Preceded by: Oscar Goodman
- Succeeded by: Shelley Berkley

First Lady of Las Vegas
- In role June 8, 1999 – July 6, 2011
- Mayor: Oscar Goodman
- Preceded by: Fletcher Jones (as First Gentleman)
- Succeeded by: Oscar Goodman (as First Gentleman)

Personal details
- Born: Carolyn Goldmark; March 25, 1939 (age 86) New York City, New York, U.S.
- Party: Independent (2009–present); Democratic (before 2009)
- Spouse: Oscar Goodman (m. 1962)
- Children: 4, including Ross
- Education: Bryn Mawr College (BA); University of Nevada, Las Vegas (MS)

Carolyn Goodman (née Goldmark; born March 25, 1939) is an American politician who served as mayor of Las Vegas, Nevada, from 2011 until 2024. She is the second female mayor of Las Vegas and is married to former mayor and attorney Oscar Goodman. She is the founder, president and trustee emerita of The Meadows School.

== Education ==
Born in New York City in 1939 to a Jewish family, Goodman attended the Brearley School, then earned a bachelor's degree in anthropology from Bryn Mawr College in 1961. She and Oscar Goodman moved to Las Vegas from Philadelphia in 1964. She graduated from the University of Nevada, Las Vegas in 1973 with a master's degree in counseling.

== Career ==
Goodman is the founder, president and trustee emerita of The Meadows School. She and her husband moved to Las Vegas in 1964 and soon became active in the local Jewish federation. Eventually, she became the leader of the local Jewish federation's women's division, a position she held for several years. She received the 2009 Commitment to Education award from the United Way of Southern Nevada.

On June 7, 2011, Goodman was elected mayor of Las Vegas with 60% of the vote in a runoff election against Chris Giunchigliani, and she took office on July 6, 2011. She was reelected in 2015 against Stavros Anthony and several minor opponents, and in April 2019 was reelected to a third (and, due to term limits, final) term, with 83.5% of the vote against several minor opponents, including local politician Phil Collins.

On October 24, 2011, Goodman greeted President Barack Obama at McCarran International Airport. In regard to negative remarks Obama had made about Las Vegas two years earlier that had angered her husband, the previous mayor, she told Obama that "the slate is brand new and clean", and gave him one of her lucky mayor chips as a gift.

On July 15, 2015, Goodman endorsed Ruben Kihuen for the U.S. House of Representatives in 2016. Kihuen defeated incumbent U.S. Representative Cresent Hardy. Days later, she endorsed Joe Heck for the U.S. Senate in 2016. On August 3, 2016, Goodman declined to endorse Hillary Clinton or Donald Trump in the 2016 presidential election. She identifies as an independent.

During her tenure as mayor, Goodman promoted Las Vegas as a home for professional sports teams. The Vegas Golden Knights of the National Hockey League (NHL) began playing professional hockey in the 2017–18 season at T-Mobile Arena and the Oakland Raiders of the National Football League (NFL) relocated to Las Vegas in 2020 to play at Allegiant Stadium, although neither team is within Las Vegas's city limits: both are in Paradise, Nevada, outside the mayor's jurisdiction. Goodman attempted to lure a soccer team to Las Vegas several times, including bids for a Major League Soccer (MLS) expansion team, and ultimately got a second-division team, the Las Vegas Lights FC of the United Soccer League (USL), which began playing in 2018. Goodman has also shown some — albeit significantly less — support for the Oakland Athletics to relocate to the city, which is expected to occur in 2028.

Goodman was no longer eligible to run for reelection due to term limits. In 2019, her final term was extended a year due to a state law that shifted all municipal elections held in off-years to even-numbered years, with her term ending in 2024.

On April 22 and 23, 2020, in interviews with MSNBC's Katy Tur and CNN's Anderson Cooper during the COVID-19 pandemic, Goodman said she wanted to reopen Las Vegas's casinos and hotels. When pressed about procedures necessary to ensure patrons' safety, she said that wasn't her responsibility and was up to the businesses. During the interview with Cooper, Goodman questioned the impact of social distancing, saying Las Vegas "offered to be a control group" to test what would happen if casinos reopened, but was advised against it "because people from all parts of southern Nevada come in to work in the city." She also suggested that social distancing be subjected to a placebo test, adding, "We would love to be that placebo". When Cooper asked whether she would be willing to go to one of the casinos if they were soon reopened, she replied: "First of all, I have a family. I don't gamble." Goodman's comments were widely criticized and faced backlash from other elected officials. U.S. Representative Dina Titus from Nevada's 1st congressional district, which includes the Las Vegas Strip, disagreed with Goodman, saying it was necessary to heed scientists' advice to shelter at home whenever possible to enable the successful recovery of Las Vegas's businesses. Titus added, "The mayor does not represent the Las Vegas Strip, literally or figuratively." Nevada Governor Steve Sisolak also pushed back, saying, "I will not allow the citizens of Nevada, our Nevadans, to be used as a control group, as a placebo, whatever she wants to call it", and that he would not "allow our workers to be put in position that they have to decide between their job and their paycheck and their life. That's not a fair position to put them in."

== Personal life ==
Goodman's husband is Oscar Goodman, who was Carolyn's predecessor as mayor from 1999 to 2011. They have four children and six grandchildren. Oscar Jr. is a doctor with the Comprehensive Cancer Centers of Nevada, Ross is a criminal defense attorney, Eric is a Las Vegas justice of the peace, and Cara is a marriage and family therapist who also works with burn victims at University Medical Center. Cara was one of three students in The Meadows School's first graduating class in 1991.

== See also ==
- List of mayors of the 50 largest cities in the United States

Honorary titles
Preceded by Fletcher Jones as First Gentleman	First Lady of Las Vegas; 1999–2011	Succeeded by Oscar Goodman as First Gentleman
Political offices
Preceded by Oscar Goodman	Mayor of Las Vegas; 2011–present	Succeeded by Shelley Berkley
