= 1995 Las Vegas mayoral election =

- May 2, 1995
Candidate	Jan Laverty Jones	H. Michael Milko
Popular vote	21,217	2,311
Percentage	71.8%	7.8%
Candidate	William P. Steffel	Willy McDonald
Popular vote	1,737	1,488
Percentage	5.9%	5.0%
Mayor before election
Jan Laverty Jones
Elected Mayor
Jan Laverty Jones

The 1995 Las Vegas mayoral election took place on May 2, 1995, to elect the mayor of Las Vegas, Nevada. The election was held concurrently with various other local elections, and was officially nonpartisan.

Incumbent Mayor Jan Laverty Jones was reelected. With Jones winning a majority in the initial round of the election, no runoff was needed.

== Results ==
Results
Candidate	Votes	%
Jan Laverty Jones (incumbent)	21,217	71.8
H. Michael Milko	2,311	7.8
William P. Steffel	1,737	5.9
Willy McDonald	1,488	5.0
Sandra Noble	1,375	4.7
John 3:16 Cook	1,206	4.1
Total votes	20,547	
