= List of mayors of Las Vegas =

Mayor of Las Vegas
- Seal of the City of Las Vegas

- Flag of the City of Las Vegas

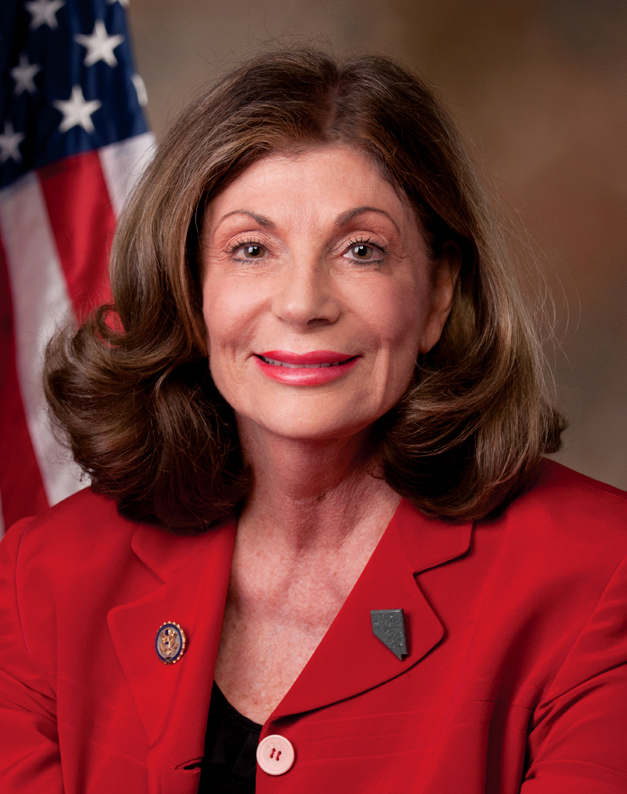
- Incumbent; Shelley Berkley since December 4, 2024
- Style: The Honorable
- Term length: Four years (renewable twice)
- Inaugural holder: Peter Buol
- Formation: 1911
- Salary: $141,331 (2017)
- Website: Office of the Mayor

The following is a list of people who have served as mayors of Las Vegas.

== List of mayors of Las Vegas ==
Mayors of Las Vegas
Term	Mayor
1911–1913	Peter Buol
1913–1919	William L. Hawkins
1919–1921	William E. Ferron
1921	Horace T. Jones
1921	Charles Ireland
1921–1922	William C. German
1922–1923	W. H. Dentner
1923–1925	William C. German
1925–1931	J. Fred Hesse
1931–1935	Ernie W. Cragin
1935–1938	Leonard L. Arnett
1938–1939	Harmon Percy Marble
1939–1941	John L. Russell
1941	Herbert Krause
1941–1943	Howell C. Garrison
1943–1951	Ernie W. Cragin
1951–1959	Charles Duncan Baker
1959–1975	Oran K. Gragson
1975–1987	William H. Briare
1987–1991	Ron Lurie
1991–1999	Jan Laverty Jones
1999–2011	Oscar Goodman
2011–2024	Carolyn Goodman
2024–present	Shelley Berkley

== See also ==
- Las Vegas history and timeline
