= List of botanical gardens and arboretums in Nevada =

This list of botanical gardens and arboretums in Nevada is intended to include all significant botanical gardens and arboretums in the U.S. state of Nevada

Name	Image	Affiliation	City
Alan Bible Botanical Garden			Boulder City
Ethel M Botanical Cactus Garden			Henderson
The Gardens at the Las Vegas Springs Preserve			Las Vegas
Wilbur D. May Arboretum and Botanical Garden			Reno
Southern Nevada Zoological-Botanical Park			Las Vegas
University of Nevada, Reno Arboretum		University of Nevada	Reno
UNLV Arboretum		University of Nevada	Paradise

== See also ==
- List of botanical gardens and arboretums in the United States
