= Queen of Hearts Hotel =

Former hotel and casino in Las Vegas

Ann Meyers' Queen of Hearts Hotel
- The original signage of the Queen of Hearts Hotel on display at the Neon Museum in Las Vegas, Nevada.

General information
- Location: 19 E. Lewis Ave. (formerly), Las Vegas, Nevada, United States
- Estimated completion: 1963
- Opened: 1963
- Demolished: February 2, 2010
- Owner: Danny Jackson (1963-1976); Ann Meyers (1976-2010)
- Landlord: Ann Meyers

Other information
- Number of rooms: 100

Ann Meyers' Queen of Hearts Hotel and Casino, formerly the Casbah Hotel and Casino was a 100-room hotel and casino formerly located at 19 East Lewis Avenue in Las Vegas, Nevada.

== Description and history ==
Originally named the Casbah Hotel and Casino, the hotel property was built by Danny Jackson in 1963 and was owned and operated by his family after Jackson died shortly after opening. In 1976, the hotel was purchased by Ann Meyers, the first woman to own and operate a hotel in Las Vegas, Nevada. Meyers, unaware of the hotel's seedy reputation, purchased it from the Jackson family on August 20, 1976, 48 hours after her first viewing. In 1990, in order to improve the hotel's image, Meyers changed the name from the Casbah Hotel and Casino to Ann Meyer's Queen of Hearts Hotel and introduced "four-star service" to budget lodgings and even saw increased business as a result. In 1992, Meyers was eventually able to move out of living in the hotel full-time and was able to purchase another nearby hotel, the Nevada Hotel, from casino operator Jackie Gaughan. Despite this, however, the hotel was still encountering problems such as prostitution, gang violence, and even a drive-by killing, with 680 calls made to police between 1994 and 1995 alone. On January 29, 2010, it was reported that the Queen of Hearts Hotel would be demolished to make way for the new Las Vegas City Hall building and business complex. The hotel's sign can be seen at the Neon Museum in Las Vegas.
