= Timeline of Reno, Nevada =

Coordinates: 39.527°N 119.822°W

The following is a timeline of the history of the city of Reno, Nevada, United States.

== 19th century ==
- 1868
  - Reno founded; named after Union Army officer Jesse Lee Reno.
  - Reno Crescent newspaper begins publication.
- 1870 – Population: 1,035.
- 1871 – Washoe County seat relocated to Reno from Washoe City.
- 1872 – Virginia and Truckee Railroad in operation.
- 1873
  - Fire.
  - Court House built.
- 1874
  - Nevada State Journal newspaper begins publication.
  - University of Nevada founded
- 1877 – Bridge rebuilt.
- 1879 – Town incorporated.
- 1882 – Nevada and Oregon Railroad begins operating.
- 1885 – Riverside Hotel in business.
- 1886 – Nevada State University relocated to Reno from Elko.
- 1894 – 20th Century Club for women organized.
- 1900 – Population: 4,500.

== 20th century ==
=== 1900s–1940s ===
- 1901 – Reno attains city status.
- 1904
  - Nevada Historical Society established.
  - Carnegie Free Public Library opens.
- 1905 – Virginia Street Bridge rebuilt.
- 1907
  - Reno Commercial Club incorporated.
  - City Hall rebuilt.
  - Richard Kirman, Sr. becomes mayor.
  - University of Nevada's Mackay School of Mines established.
- 1910
  - July 4: Jeffries-Johnson boxing match held.
  - Washoe County Courthouse and Bethel AME Church built.
  - Population: 10,867.
- 1911 – YMCA building dedicated.
- 1913 – Divorce residence requirement: one year.
- 1914 - Largest recorded earthquake in Reno, M6.4 occurs on April 24
- 1922 – Nevada Public Economy League headquartered in Reno.
- 1923 – Edwin E. Roberts becomes mayor.
- 1925 – Empire Theatre opens.
- 1926 – Southern Pacific Railroad depot and Reno Arch built.
- 1927
  - Transcontinental Highway Exposition held; California Building constructed.
  - Divorce residence requirement: three months.
- 1928 – State Theatre opens.
- 1929 – Hubbard Field (airfield) and Odd Fellows Building constructed.
- 1930 – Population: 18,529.
- 1931
  - Gambling legalized.
  - Divorce residence requirement: six weeks.
  - Nevada Art Gallery founded.
  - Washoe County Library building opens.
  - El Cortez Hotel in business.
  - Roman Catholic Diocese of Reno established.
- 1933 – Reno Main Post Office built.
- 1935 – Reno Little Theater founded.
- 1936
  - Southside School Annex built.
  - Harold's Club founded.
- 1937 – Harrah's Entertainment (bingo parlor) in business.
- 1939 – First Church of Christ, Scientist built.
- 1942 – Reno Army Air Base in operation.

=== 1950s–1990s ===
- 1953 – KZTV television and KNEV radio begin broadcasting.
- 1957 – February 5: Gas explosion.
- 1959 – Desert Research Institute established.
- 1960
  - Airport terminal built.
  - Population: 51,470.
- 1962 – Club Cal Neva casino in business.
- 1964 – Reno Air Races begin.
- 1966 – Downtown Library opens.
- 1967 – Pioneer Center for the Performing Arts built.
- 1969 – Reno Philharmonic Orchestra formed.
- 1970 – Population: 72,863.
- 1971 – Peppermill Reno in business.
- 1972 – Atlantis Casino Resort in business.
- 1973 – Eldorado Reno in business.
- 1974 – Reno Chamber Orchestra established.
- 1976 – Fitzgeralds Casino in business.
- 1977 – National Reno Gay Rodeo active.
- 1978 – Meadowood Mall, Circus Circus Casino, and MGM Grand Reno casino in business.
- 1980 – Population: 100,756.
- 1981 – Nevada School of Law at Old College founded.
- 1982
  - Balloon Race begins.
  - Reno Pops Orchestra formed.
- 1983
  - Reno Gazette-Journal newspaper in publication.
  - KNPB television and KRNV-FM radio begin broadcasting.
- 1984 – University of Nevada's School of Journalism established.
- 1985
  - January 21: Airplane crash.
  - University of Nevada, Reno Arboretum established.
  - December 23: Judas Priest fans James Vance and Raymond Belknap shoot themselves in a suicide pact.
- 1989 – Sierra Safari Zoo opens.
- 1990 – Population: 133,850.
- 1992
  - Nevada Humanities Chautauqua established.
  - Reno Air begins operating.
- 1995
  - National Bowling Stadium opens.
  - Silver Legacy Reno in business.
- 1997 – Great Basin Bird Observatory founded.
- 1999
  - Reno–Tahoe Open golf tournament begins.
  - Artown nonprofit active.
- 2000
  - City website online (approximate date).
  - Population: 180,480.

== 21st century ==
- 2002 – Bob Cashell becomes mayor.
- 2003 – Fictional Reno 911! television series begins national broadcast.
- 2004
  - Sierra Foundation established.
  - Reno River Fest begins.
- 2005 – Great Basin Community Food Co-op founded.
- 2006
  - March 14: Pine Middle School shooting.
  - Battle Born Derby Demons (rollerderby league) established.
- 2008 – April: 2008 Reno earthquakes.
- 2010
  - Stewie deemed world's longest domestic cat.
  - Population: 225,221; metro 425,417.
- 2011 – September 16: Reno Air Races crash.
- 2014 – Hillary Schieve becomes mayor.

== See also ==
- History of Reno
- National Register of Historic Places listings in Washoe County, Nevada
- Timeline of Las Vegas

== Bibliography ==
=== Published in 19th century ===
- John F. Uhlhorn, ed. (1873), "Reno Directory", Virginia and Truckee Railroad Directory, 1873–74, Sacramento: H.S. Crocker & Co.
- George A. Crofutt (1880). "Reno". Crofutt's New Overland Tourist, and Pacific Coast Guide. Overland Publishing Company.

=== Published in 20th century ===
- "Reno, the Refuge of Restless Hearts". Munsey's Magazine. 42. 1909.
- Sam P. Davis, ed. (1913), "Washoe County: Reno", History of Nevada, Reno, Nevada: Elms Publishing Co., OCLC 7990365
- Directory of Reno and Sparks. Reno: Nevada Directory Publishing Company. 1915 – via Internet Archive.
- Willis Thomas Lee; Ralph Walter Stone; Hoyt Stoddard Gale (1916). "Reno". Guidebook of the Western United States. Government Printing Office.
- "Points of Interest in Reno, Nev.". Automobile Blue Book. New York: Automobile Blue Book Publishing Co. 1919.
- "Reno". Travel. 39. New York: Robert M. McBride & Co. 1922.
- Federal Writers' Project (1957), "Reno", Nevada: A Guide to the Silver State, American Guide Series, Portland, Or.: Binfords & Mort, hdl:2027/mdp.39015048749454 + Chronology
- John A. Price (1972). "Reno, Nevada: The City as a Unit of Study". Urban Anthropology. 1 (1): 014–028. JSTOR 40552854.
