= Las Vegas City Hall (1973) =

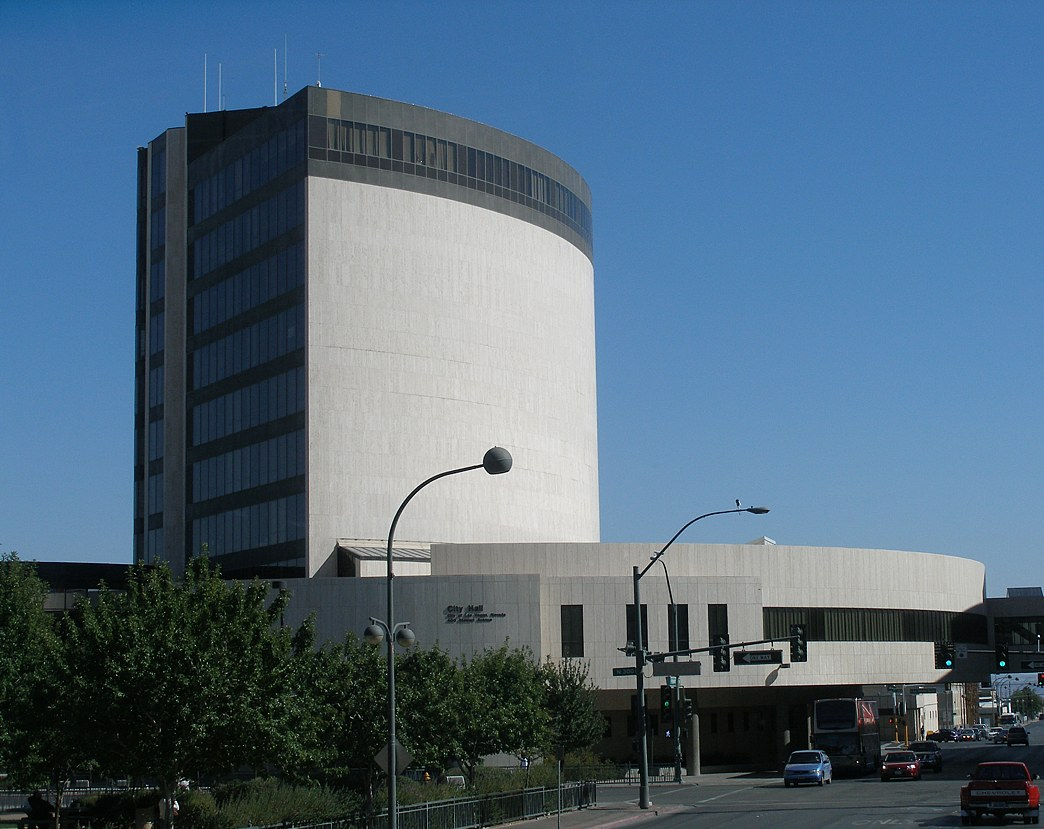
- Las Vegas City Hall
- Interactive map of the Las Vegas City Hall area

General information
- Status: Completed
- Type: Government
- Location: 400 Stewart Ave, Las Vegas, Nevada
- Coordinates: 36°10′20″N 115°8′21″W
- Opening: 1973 (original building); 2003 (addition)
- Owner: City of Las Vegas

Technical details
- Floor count: 11

Design and construction
- Architects: Daniel, Mann, Johnson, and Mendenhall (original building); KGA Architecture (2003 addition)
- Main contractor: Del E. Webb Construction Company (original building)

Las Vegas City Hall was the center of municipal government for the City of Las Vegas, Nevada. It is located downtown, with its main entrance on Stewart Avenue. It is cited as an example of 1960s modern architecture. The original eleven-story central tower was completed in 1973. An addition was completed in 2003 which included a three-story surround to the central tower. The addition includes additional office space, a parking deck, and a sky bridge to connect the parking deck to the structure. The addition won the American Institute of Architects Nevada Citation award in 2003.

In November 2010, online retailer Zappos.com announced it would buy and use the building as its new company headquarters.

== New Las Vegas City Hall and Zappos Purchase ==
In 2010, construction for a new city hall building began at a different site and the city government vacated the old building in early 2012. The building was purchased in 2012 for $18 million, and occupied in 2013 by Zappos after an extensive renovation. Zappos sold the property in 2020 for $65 million in a sale plus leaseback transaction to an entity affiliated with Tony Hsieh, founder of Zappos.
