= UNLV Arboretum =

Arboretum in Paradise, Nevada, United States

Coordinates: 39°32′45″N 119°49′00″W

The UNLV Arboretum is an 80-acre (32 ha) arboretum on the campus of the University of Nevada, Las Vegas in Paradise, Nevada.

The arboretum was established in 1985, and includes all of the landscaped areas of the entire 335-acre (136 ha) campus. The arboretum's missions are to display mature plants suited for high desert conditions, and to investigate new plants and cultivars. The arboretum also includes a 2-acre (0.81 ha) Xeric Garden, established in 1988 and located at the entrance to the Marjorie Barrick Museum, which contains plants from arid regions from around the world.

== See also ==
- List of botanical gardens in the United States
