= University of Nevada, Reno Arboretum =

State arboretum in Reno, Nevada, United States

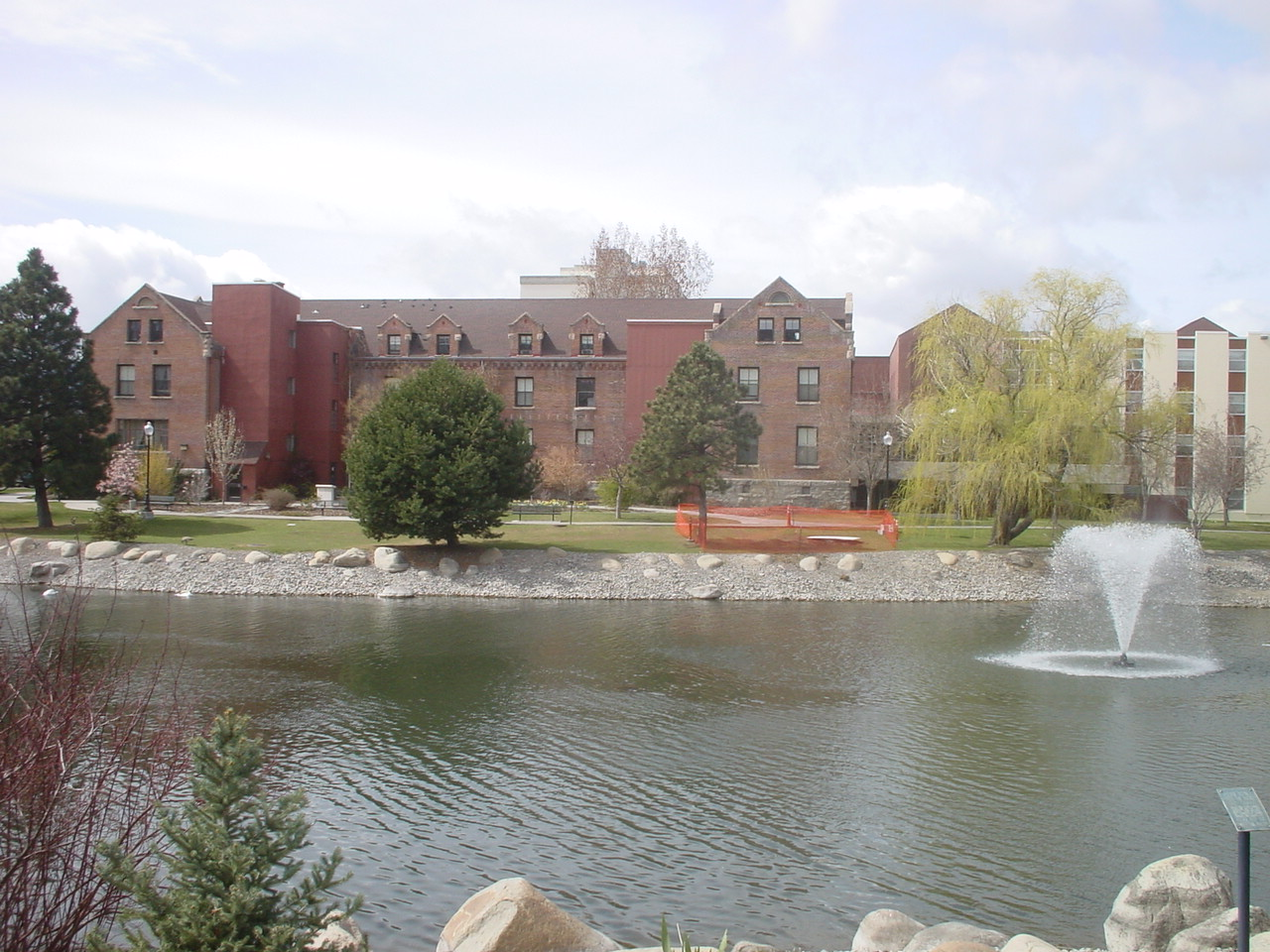
- Manzanita Lake, a shot taken from the campus of University of Nevada, Reno.

- Location within Nevada
- Type: Arboretum
- Location: University of Nevada, Reno
- Nearest city: Reno, Nevada
- Coordinates: 39°32′45″N 119°49′00″W
- Established: 1985
- Founder: Nevada Legislature
- Owner: The University of Nevada
- Status: Open all year
- Website: Official website

University of Nevada, Reno Arboretum is a state arboretum located across the campus at the University of Nevada, Reno in Reno, Nevada.

The arboretum was established in 1985 and contains a collection of trees, shrubs, flowers, ornamentals and native flora, including over 60 genera and about 200 species of trees, many with several cultivars present. Thirty-six mature elm trees line the Quad.

- Cherry Blossom Garden – Mt. Fuji cherry trees, azaleas, bamboo and ornamental grasses.
- Benson Gardens and Xeriscape, with Challenger Tree Memorial – crabapples, plums, maples, evergreens, plus an area of drought tolerant plants. Blue Atlas Cedars commemorate the astronauts lost in the Challenger Space Shuttle accident.
- The Quad – The Quad was originally used as a parade ground for student cadets in the late 19th century and in 1908 replanted to Thomas Jefferson's design for the University of Virginia lawn. In 1988, several elms were removed due to Dutch elm disease. The Quad is now planted with a mixture of elm, hackberry, ash and oak trees, and the lawn is interspersed with weeping white birch, oak and evergreen trees.
- Jimmie's Garden – rock daphne, hornbeam, weeping Nootka cypress, a Japanese pagoda tree, star magnolias, rhododendrons, perennial shrubs and flowers.
- Fleischmann Agriculture Entry Landscape – magnolia, spring-flowering bulbs and annuals. Trees include crimean lindens, ash, blue spruce, dwarf montgomery spruce and flowering pears along the street.
- Merriam A. Brown Rose Garden – roses.
- Manzanita Lake
- Joe Robertson Native Garden – plants from the Great Basin Desert, Mojave Desert and Sonoran Desert.

== See also ==
- List of botanical gardens and arboretums in the United States
