= Las Vegas City Hall =

Coordinates: 36.1673°N 115.1484°W

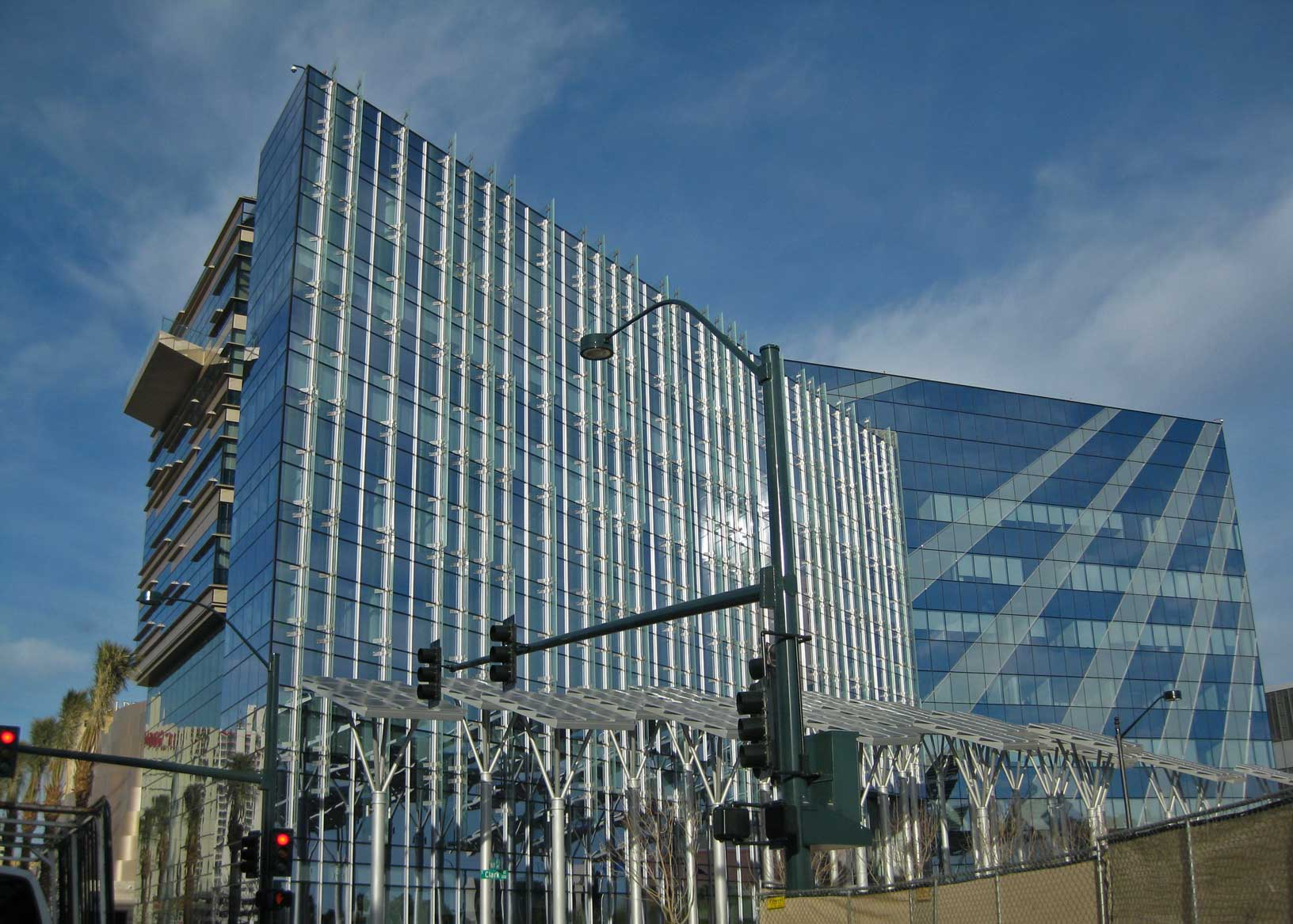
- Las Vegas City Hall

General information
- Status: Completed
- Type: Government
- Location: 495 South Main Street, Las Vegas, Nevada
- Construction started: 2010; 16 years ago
- Completed: 2012; 14 years ago
- Opening: February 21, 2012
- Cost: $146,241,000
- Owner: City of Las Vegas

Technical details
- Floor count: 7
- Floor area: 310,000 square feet (29,000 m^{2})

Design and construction
- Developer: Forest City Enterprises
- Structural engineer: DeSimone Consulting Engineers
- Main contractor: Whiting-Turner

Other information
- Parking: 47 spaces

Website
- Las Vegas City Official Website City Hall

Las Vegas City Hall is the center of municipal government for the City of Las Vegas, Nevada. It is located downtown, with its main entrance on Main Street.

== History ==
This building replaced the former building which had been used since 1973. Built by Forest City Enterprises, the highly-sustainable building features several environmentally friendly features, such as 33 energy producing solar trees as well as rooftop solar panels that reduce energy costs. A programmable LED light display on the front facade can display various patterns at night. The city of Las Vegas has a council–manager government. The mayor sits as a council member-at-large and presides over all city council meetings. If the mayor cannot preside over a City Council meeting, then the Mayor Pro-Tem is the presiding officer of the meeting until the Mayor returns to his/her seat. The City Manager is responsible for the administration and the day-to-day operations of all municipal services and city departments. The City Manager maintains intergovernmental relationships with federal, state, county and other local governments.

Much of the Las Vegas metropolitan area is split into neighboring incorporated cities or unincorporated communities. Approximately 700,000 people live in unincorporated areas governed by Clark County, and another 465,000 live in incorporated cities such as North Las Vegas, Henderson and Boulder City. City of Las Vegas and Clark County share a police department, the Las Vegas Metropolitan Police Department, which was formed after a 1973 merger of the Las Vegas Police Department and the Clark County Sheriff's Department.

A Paiute Indian reservation occupies about 1 acre (0.40 ha) in the downtown area.

Las Vegas, home to the Lloyd D. George Federal District Courthouse and the Regional Justice Center, draws numerous companies providing bail, marriage, divorce, tax, incorporation and other legal services.

=== City council ===
| Name | Position | Party | References | Notes |
|---|---|---|---|---|
| Carolyn Goodman | Mayor | Independent | | Replaced her husband, Oscar Goodman, who was term-limited |
| Brian Knudsen | 1st Ward Council member | Democratic | | Mayor Pro Tem |
| Victoria Seaman | 2nd Ward Council member | Republican | | |
| Olivia Diaz | 3rd Ward Council member | Democratic | | |
| Francis Allen-Palenske | 4th Ward Council member | Republican | | |
| Cedric Crear | 5th Ward Council member | Democratic | | |
| Nancy Brune | 6th Ward Council member | Democratic | | |
