= Hemp Farming Act =

Hemp Farming Act may refer to:

- Industrial Hemp Farming Act of 2005
- Industrial Hemp Farming Act of 2009
- Hemp Farming Act of 2018
