= Citizens United (disambiguation) =

Citizens United usually refers to the 2010 U.S. Supreme Court case Citizens United v. FEC.

It may also refer to:

- Citizens United (organization), a U.S. conservative advocacy group
- Citizens United for Research in Epilepsy, a U.S. medical organization
- Citizens United for Rehabilitation of Errants, a U.S. prisoner support organization
- Citizens United to Protect the Maurice River and Its Tributaries, Inc., a U.S. watershed organization

== See also ==
- Americans United, U.S. political organization
- Citizens Together (Ensemble Citoyens!), French political alliance
