= Barney Frank =

American politician (1940–2026)

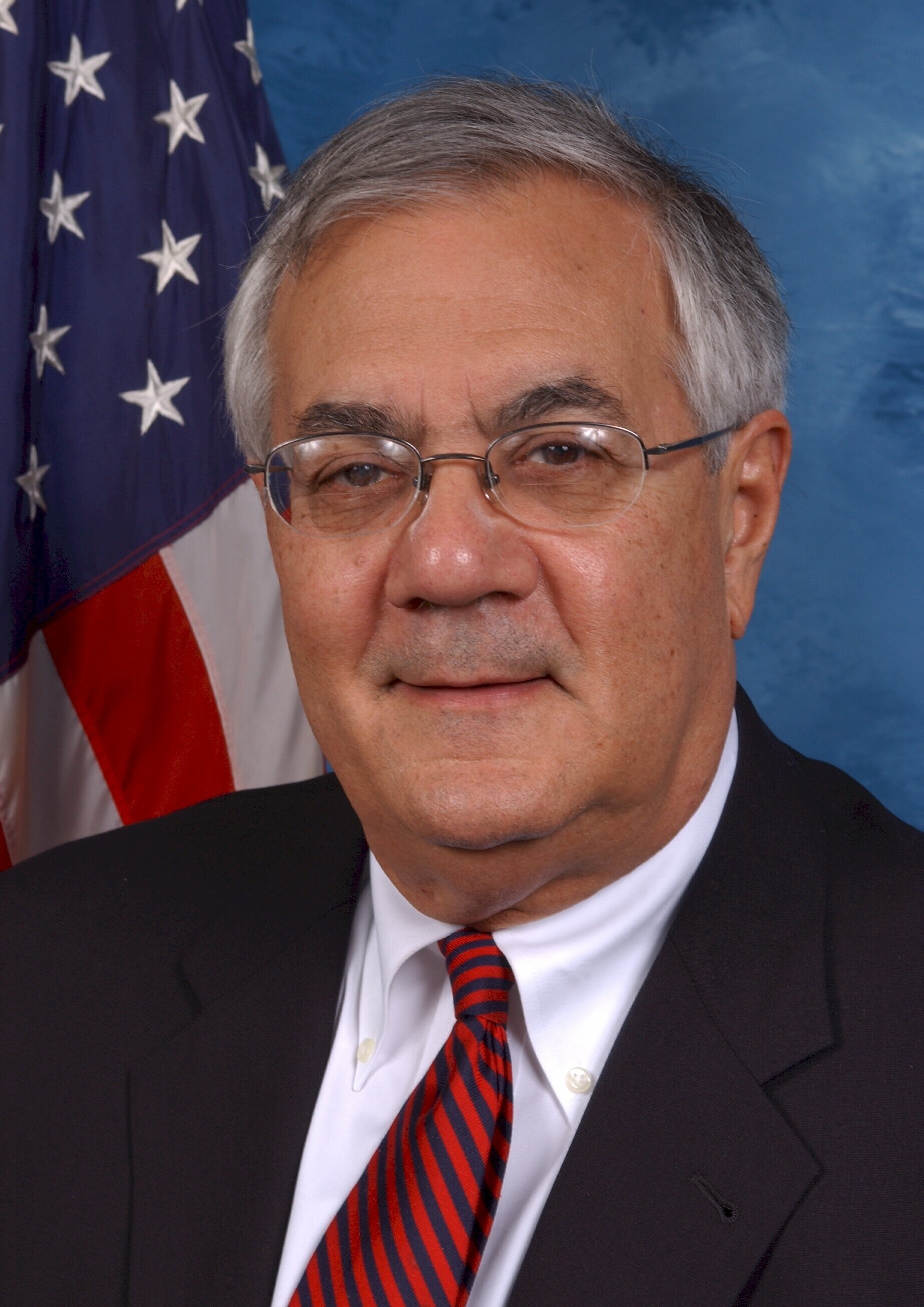

Ranking Member of the House Financial Services Committee
- In office January 3, 2011 – January 3, 2013
- Preceded by: Spencer Bachus
- Succeeded by: Maxine Waters
- In office January 3, 2003 – January 3, 2007
- Preceded by: John LaFalce
- Succeeded by: Spencer Bachus

Chair of the House Financial Services Committee
- In office January 4, 2007 – January 3, 2011
- Preceded by: Mike Oxley
- Succeeded by: Spencer Bachus

Member of the U.S. House of Representatives from Massachusetts's 4th district
- In office January 3, 1981 – January 3, 2013
- Preceded by: Robert Drinan
- Succeeded by: Joe Kennedy III

Member of the Massachusetts House of Representatives
- In office January 3, 1973 – January 3, 1981
- Preceded by: Eliot Wadsworth
- Succeeded by: Thomas Vallely
- Constituency: 5th Suffolk district (1973–1979); 8th Suffolk district (1979–1981)

Personal details
- Born: Barnett Frank; March 31, 1940 Bayonne, New Jersey, U.S.
- Died: May 19, 2026 (aged 86) Ogunquit, Maine, U.S.
- Party: Democratic
- Spouse: Jim Ready (m. 2012)
- Relations: Ann Lewis (sister)
- Education: Harvard University (BA, JD)
- Frank's voice Frank on the need for the Emergency Economic Stabilization Act of 2008. Recorded September 29, 2008

Barney Frank (March 31, 1940 – May 19, 2026) was an American politician who served as a member of the U.S. House of Representatives from Massachusetts from 1981 to 2013. A Democrat, Frank served as chairman of the House Financial Services Committee from 2007 to 2011 and was a leading co-sponsor of the 2010 Dodd–Frank Act, the primary legislative response to the 2007–2008 financial crisis. Frank, a resident of Newton, Massachusetts, was considered the most prominent gay politician in the United States during his time in Congress.

Born and raised in Bayonne, New Jersey, Frank graduated from Bayonne High School, Harvard College, and Harvard Law School. He worked as a political aide before winning election to the Massachusetts House of Representatives in 1972. He was elected to the U.S. House of Representatives in 1980 with 52 percent of the vote. He was re-elected every term thereafter by wide margins.

In 1987, Frank publicly came out as gay, becoming the first member of Congress to do so voluntarily. From 2003 until his retirement, Frank was the leading Democrat on the Financial Services Committee, and he served as committee chairman when his party held a House majority from 2007 to 2011. In July 2012, he married his long-time partner, James Ready, becoming the first member of Congress to marry someone of the same sex while in office. Frank did not seek re-election in 2012, and was succeeded by fellow Democrat Joe Kennedy III.

== Early life, education, and early career ==
Frank was born on March 31, 1940, in Bayonne, New Jersey, one of four children of Elsie (née Golush) and Samuel Frank. His family was Jewish, and his grandparents had emigrated from Poland and Russia. His mother worked as a legal secretary at the New York law firm Cravath, Swaine & Moore. Frank's father ran a truck stop in Jersey City—a place Frank described as "totally corrupt"—and when Frank was 6 or 7, his father served a year in prison for refusing to testify to a grand jury against Frank's uncle. Frank was educated at Bayonne High School, before matriculating at Harvard College, where he resided in Matthews Hall his first year and then in Kirkland House and Winthrop House. He graduated in 1962.

Frank's undergraduate studies were interrupted by the death of his father, and Frank took a year off to help resolve the family's affairs prior to his graduation. In 1964, he was a volunteer in Mississippi during Freedom Summer. He taught undergraduates at Harvard while studying for a PhD in government, but left in 1968 before completing the degree, to become Boston mayor Kevin White's Chief Assistant, a position he held for three years. He then served for a year as Administrative Assistant to Congressman Michael J. Harrington. In 1977, Frank graduated from Harvard Law School, where he was once a student of Henry Kissinger, while serving as a Massachusetts state representative.

== Pre-congressional career ==
In 1972, Frank was elected to the Massachusetts House of Representatives where he served for eight years. He made a name for himself in the mid-1970s as a political defender of the Combat Zone, Boston's notorious red-light district. Neighborhoods in Frank's district bordered the Combat Zone. As a means of dealing with crime in the area (including violence, police corruption, and the infiltration of it by organized crime), he introduced a bill into the Massachusetts General Court that would have legalized the sex-for-hire business but kept it quarantined in a red-light district, which would have been moved to Boston's Financial District.

In 1979, Frank was admitted to the bar in Massachusetts. While in state and local government, he taught, part-time, at the University of Massachusetts Boston, the John F. Kennedy School of Government at Harvard, and at Boston University. He published numerous articles on politics and public affairs; in 1992, he published Speaking Frankly, a book on the role the Democratic Party should play in the 1990s.

== U.S. House of Representatives ==
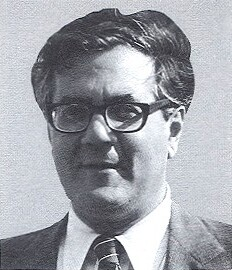
1981, Congressional Pictorial Directory – Frank's first term as Congressman

=== Elections ===
In 1980, Frank ran for the U.S. House of Representatives in the 4th congressional district, hoping to succeed Reverend Robert Drinan, who had left Congress, following a call by Pope John Paul II for priests to withdraw from political positions. In the Democratic primary held on September 16, 1980, Frank won 52% of the vote in a four-candidate field. As the Democratic nominee, he faced Republican Richard A. Jones in the general election and won narrowly, 52–48%.

For his first term, Frank represented a district in the western and southern suburbs of Boston, anchored by Brookline and his hometown of Newton. However, in 1982, redistricting forced him to run against Republican Margaret Heckler, who represented a district centered on the South Coast, including Fall River and New Bedford. Although the newly configured district retained Frank's district number—the 4th—it was geographically more Heckler's district. Frank focused on Heckler's initial support for President Ronald Reagan's tax cuts, and won with 60% of the vote.

Frank did not face another serious race again for a quarter-century. From 1984 to 2008, he won re-election 12 times with at least 66% of the vote; in 1994, 1998, 2002, and 2006, this was with a more than overwhelming 97% of the vote, with no challenge from a major political party, while in 1986 and 2004 he was opposed only by independent candidates, with the Republicans declining to field a candidate against him.

In 2010, Frank ran for his 16th term. Public opinion polling showed him facing his first credible challenge since defeating Heckler in 1982. His opponent was Republican Sean Bielat, a U.S. Marine veteran and businessman. In mid-September, an internal poll showed Frank leading 48–38%. In late October, he loaned his campaign $200,000. In early October, The Cook Political Report changed its assessment of the district from "solid Democratic" to "likely Democratic"—meaning that while Frank was favored, a victory by Bielat could not be entirely ruled out. While Frank had a 3-to-1 advantage in terms of cash on hand, Bielat outraised him in September. On October 25, a survey by The Boston Globe showed Frank leading 46–33%. Frank won re-election to his 16th term, 54–43%.

On November 28, 2011, Frank announced at a news conference that he would not seek re-election in 2012.

=== Tenure ===
==== Scandal ====
In 1985, Frank was still publicly closeted. That year he hired Steve Gobie, a male prostitute, for sex, and they became "more friends than sexual partners." Frank housed Gobie and hired him with personal funds as an aide, housekeeper, and driver and paid for his attorney and court-ordered psychiatrist.

In 1987, Frank evicted Gobie after being advised by his landlord that Gobie kept escorting despite the support and was doing so in the residence. Later that year, Gobie's friends persuaded him that he had a gay male version of Mayflower Madam, a TV movie about an escort service. In 1989, Gobie tried to initiate a bidding war for the story between WUSA-TV (Channel 9), The Washington Times, and The Washington Post. He then gave the story to The Washington Times for nothing, in hopes of getting a book contract.

Amid calls for an investigation, Frank asked the House Ethics Committee to investigate his relationship "in order to ensure that the public record is clear." The Committee found no evidence that Frank had known of or been involved in the alleged illegal activity and dismissed all of Gobie's more scandalous claims; they recommended a reprimand for Frank using his congressional office to fix 33 of Gobie's parking tickets and for misstatements of fact in a memorandum relating to Gobie's criminal probation record. The House voted 408–18 to reprimand Frank.

The attempts to censure and expel Frank were led by Republican Larry Craig. Eventually, Frank would criticize Craig for hypocrisy after Craig's own arrest in 2007 for lewd conduct in a public restroom. Despite the controversy, Frank won re-election in 1990 with 66 percent of the vote, and by larger margins until the 2010 mid-term elections when his victory margin went down to eleven points.

In 2003, a documentary film about Barney Frank titled Let's Get Frank was released. The documentary recounted Barney Frank's struggle coming out in public and political life as a prominent gay man, the height of which was his reprimand following the Gobie scandal, and documented Frank's dedicated defense of U.S. President Bill Clinton during his impeachment trial in January and February 1999. At the time of its release, Let's Get Frank received mixed reviews, some celebrating the film, as Ken Eisner did in Variety, and others struggling with director Bart Everly's distinct style and the dual telling of Frank's own personal story along with that of the Clinton Impeachment Trial through Frank's eyes, as Ed Halter did in The Village Voice.

==== Public image ====
"Mr. Frank has earned a reputation during his 28 years in Congress as a sharp-tongued and quick-witted debater," summarized The New York Times in 2008. In one quip, he complained the Starr Report detailing President Bill Clinton's relationship with Monica Lewinsky was "too much reading about heterosexual sex". Despite being on opposites sides during the impeachment, Frank was good friends with representative Henry Hyde, praising his efforts to keep the impeachment "personality free".

In 2004 and again in 2006, a survey of Capitol Hill staffers published in Washingtonian gave Frank the title of the "brainiest," "funniest," and "most eloquent" member of the House. In 2008, the same survey named him "brainiest" and runner-up for "workhorse" and "most eloquent." In 2010, he was declared "brainiest," "workhorse," and "funniest" member of the House. During his tenure, he was widely considered one of the smartest, most powerful members of Congress. Democratic speech writer—and later U.S. representative for New Jersey—Josh Gottheimer, in his book Ripples of Hope: Great American Civil Rights Speeches, describes Frank as "one of the brightest and most energetic defenders of civil rights issues."

==== Fannie Mae and Freddie Mac ====
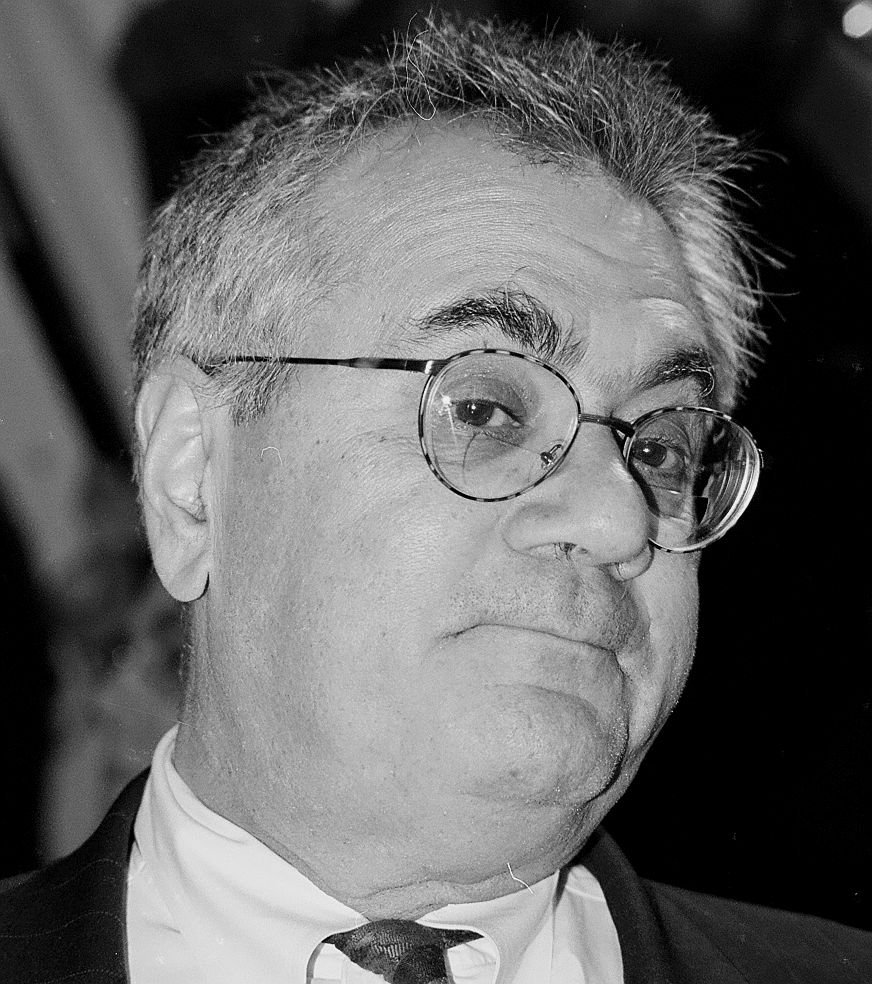
Frank in 1998

Frank was scrutinized for campaign contributions from Fannie Mae and Freddie Mac. OpenSecrets reported in 2009 that Frank received over $42,000 in campaign contributions from the two organizations since 1989. Fannie Mae also made grants in 1994 and 2001 of $75,000 to a charity cofounded by Frank's mother. Bill Sammon, political editor of Fox News, claimed the donations from Fannie and Freddie influenced his support of their lending programs, and said that Frank did not play a strong enough role in reforming the institutions in the years leading up to the economic crisis of 2008. In their 2011 book Reckless Endangerment, New York Times business reporter Gretchen Morgenson and co-author Josh Rosner called Frank a "major recipient of Fannie Mae's largesse, albeit indirectly" and "a perpetual protector of Fannie."

Additionally, in 1991, Fannie Mae hired Herb Moses, Frank's domestic partner, to a managerial position following a recommendation by Frank. While with Fannie Mae from 1991 to 1998, Moses oversaw projects "relaxing Fannie Mae's restrictions on home improvement loans and small farm mortgages", wrote Morgenson and Rosner. During a 1991 hearing of the House Banking subcommittee on housing and community development, Frank objected to a proposal by Congressional Budget Office director Robert Reischauer to make "safety and soundness" the primary objective for Fannie Mae, aggressively enough that subcommittee chair Henry B. Gonzalez needed to intervene to allow Reischauer a chance to speak.

In 2006, a Fannie Mae representative stated in United States Securities and Exchange Commission filings that it "did not participate in large amounts of these non-traditional mortgages in 2004 and 2005." In response to criticism, Frank said, "In 2004, it was Bush who started to push Fannie and Freddie into subprime mortgages, because they were boasting about how they were expanding homeownership for low-income people. And I said at the time, 'Hey—(a) this is going to jeopardize their profitability, but (b) it's going to put people in homes they can't afford, and they're gonna lose them.'"

In 2009, Frank responded to what he called "wholly inaccurate efforts by Republicans to blame Democrats, and [me] in particular" for the subprime mortgage crisis, which is linked to the 2008 financial crisis. He outlined his efforts to reform these institutions and add regulations, but met resistance from Republicans, with the main exception being a bill with Republican Mike Oxley that died because of opposition from President Bush.

The 2005 bill included Frank objectives, which were to impose tighter regulation of Fannie and Freddie and new funds for rental housing. Frank and Mike Oxley achieved broad bipartisan support for the bill in the Financial Services Committee, and it passed the House. But the Senate never voted on the measure, in part because President Bush was likely to veto it. "If it had passed, that would have been one of the ways we could have reined in the bowling ball going downhill called housing," Oxley told Frank.

In an op-ed piece in The Wall Street Journal, Lawrence B. Lindsey, a former economic adviser to President George W. Bush, wrote that Frank "is the only politician I know who has argued that we needed tighter rules that intentionally produce fewer homeowners and more renters." Once control shifted to the Democrats, Frank was able to help guide both the Federal Housing Reform Act (H.R. 1427) and the Mortgage Reform and Anti-Predatory Lending Act (H.R. 3915) to passage in 2007. Frank also said that the Republican-led Gramm–Leach–Bliley Act of 1999, which repealed part of the Glass–Steagall Act of 1933 and removed the wall between commercial and investment banks, contributed to the financial meltdown.

==== Subprime mortgage crisis ====
As former chairman of the House Financial Services Committee, beginning in 2007, Frank was "at the center of power". Frank was a critic of aspects of the Federal Reserve system, partnering with some Republicans in opposition to some policies. Frank said that he and Republican Congressman Ron Paul "first bonded because we were both conspicuous nonworshipers at the Temple of the Fed and of the High Priest Alan Greenspan."

Frank was a prominent figure in congressional debates on mortgage foreclosure bailouts. In 2008 Frank supported passage of the American Housing Rescue & Foreclosure Prevention Act, intended to protect thousands of homeowners from foreclosure. This law, H.R. 3221, is considered one of the most important and complex issues on which he worked. In an August 2007 op-ed piece in Financial Times, Frank wrote, "In the debate between those who believe in essentially unregulated markets and others who hold that reasonable regulation diminishes market excesses without inhibiting their basic function, the subprime situation unfortunately provides ammunition for the latter view." Frank was also instrumental in the passage of H.R. 5244, the Credit Cardholders' Bill of Rights Act of 2008, a measure that drew praise from editorial boards and consumer advocates. In 2007, Frank co-sponsored legislation to reform the Section 202 refinancing program, which is for affordable housing for the elderly, and Section 811 disabled programs. Frank was a chief advocate of the National Housing Trust Fund, which was created as part of the Housing and Economic Recovery Act of 2008 and was the first affordable housing program to be enacted by the Congress since 1990.

During the subprime mortgage crisis, Frank was characterized as "a key deal-maker, an unlikely bridge between his party's left-wing base and ... free market conservatives" in the Bush administration. Hank Paulson, the U.S. Treasury Secretary for the Bush administration, said he enjoyed Frank's penchant for brokering deals, "he is looking to get things done and make a difference, he focuses on areas of agreement and tries to build on those."

The New York Times noted that the Federal Housing Administration's crucial role in the nation's housing market, providing low-down-payment mortgages during the crisis of 2007–2010 when no mortgages would otherwise have been available, "helped avert full-scale disaster" by helping people purchase or refinance homes and thereby putting a floor under falling home prices. However, due to the tighter flow of credit from the banks, total FHA loans in 2009 were four times that of 2006, raising concern that year that if the economy were to dip back into recession, more Fed funds could be required to keep those loans afloat. Frank's response was that the additional defaults—2.2% more of the total portfolio in 2009 than the year before—were worth the economic stabilization of the broader policy, noting "It was an effort to keep prices from falling too fast." In that context, he opined, "I don't think it's a bad thing that the bad loans occurred." In fact, the unprecedented number of loans made since 2008 were noted to be performing far better than those in the prior two years.

== Political positions and votes ==
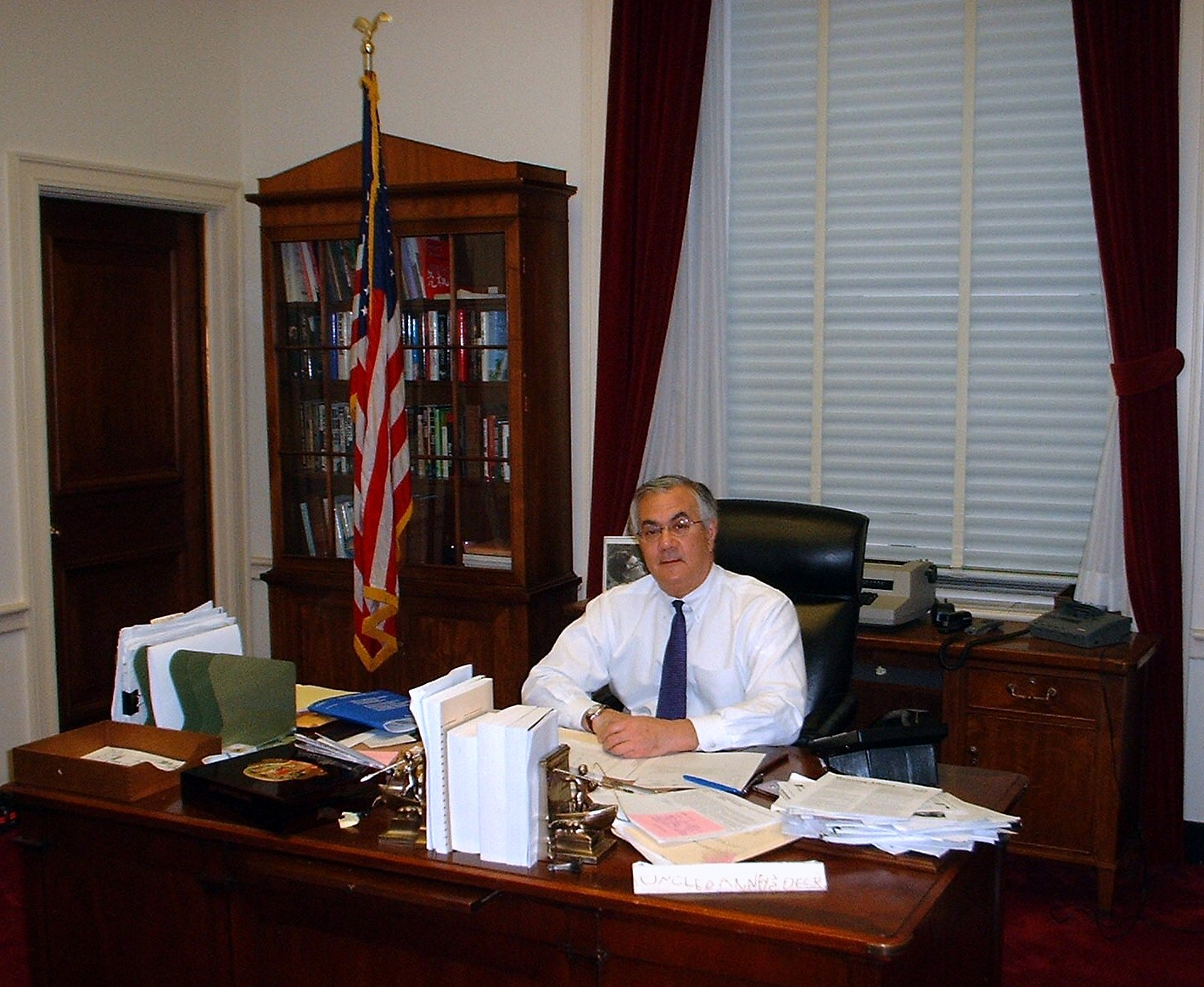
Frank in 2002 in his congressional office

=== Abortion ===
In 2009, Frank had a 100% rating from NARAL Pro-Choice America, indicating a pro-choice voting record for abortion rights. He voted against the Partial-Birth Abortion Ban Act, against the Unborn Victims of Violence Act, and against restrictions on the transportation of minors across state lines by non-family members to circumvent local abortion laws. In 1993, Frank co-sponsored the "Freedom of Choice Act" (H.R.25) (1993-H25) to "protect the reproductive rights of women."

In 2006, he co-sponsored the "Compassionate Assistance for Rape Emergencies Act" (S.3945) (06-S3945), a bill for "emergency contraception for rape victims." In 2007, he co-sponsored two important pieces of legislation: the "Compassionate Care for Servicewomen Act" (S.1800 & HR.2064) (07-HR2064) to provide "emergency contraception at military facilities," and the "Prevention First Act" (S.21&H.R.463 2009-S21) to "expand access to preventive health care services that help reduce unintended pregnancy, reduce abortions, and improve access to women's health care."

=== Civil rights ===
In 1987, Frank was the Chair of the House Judiciary Subcommittee on Administrative Law and Governmental Relations in the 100th Congress. In this position, he was one of the staunchest supporters of redress and reparations for Japanese American internment during World War II. In 2001, Frank co-sponsored an amendment to the U.S. Constitution to apply equal rights based on gender differences. In 2002, he co-sponsored the "Federal Agency Protection of Privacy Act" (H.R.4561) to require a "Privacy Impact Statement" on new federal rules. In 2002, he was scored at 93% by the American Civil Liberties Union on civil rights issues indicating a pro-civil rights voting record.

In 2006, Frank was one of three Representatives to oppose the Respect for America's Fallen Heroes Act, which restricted protests (notably those of Fred Phelps' Westboro Baptist Church) at soldiers' funerals. He opposed the bill, which passed unanimously in the Senate, on civil liberties and constitutional grounds. Frank said of the vote, "I think it's very likely to be found unconstitutional. It's true that when you defend civil liberties you are typically defending people who do obnoxious things ... You play into their hand when you let them provoke you into overdoing it. I don't want these thugs to [make the] claim [that] America is hypocritical." The National Association for the Advancement of Colored People scored him at 100% in 2006 indicating a pro-affirmative-action stance.

In 2007, Frank co-sponsored the "Partnership Benefits and Obligations Act" (S.2521/H.R.4838) to "provide benefits to domestic partners of Federal employees". That same year, he co-sponsored the "Equal Rights Amendment" (S.J.RES.10/H.J.RES.40) to "strengthen the ongoing efforts of women across the country to obtain equal treatment." In 2009, he signed bills recognizing the 40th anniversary of the Stonewall riots and the 100th anniversary of the NAACP.

Frank was outspoken on many civil rights issues, including lesbian, gay, bisexual and transgender (LGBT) rights. In 1987, he publicly came out as gay. In 1990, Frank was instrumental in crafting the 1990 Immigration Act, which restated the reasons for which a person could be denied entry into the country. The act did not include "sexual preference exclusion[s]", reforming earlier immigration law which allowed persons to be excluded for a sexual deviance "afflict[ion]". He said in a 1996 interview: "I'm used to being in the minority. I'm a left-handed gay Jew. I've never felt, automatically, a member of any majority." In 1995, then-Republican House Majority Leader Dick Armey famously referred to Frank as "Barney Fag" in a press interview. Armey apologized and said it was "a slip of the tongue". Frank did not accept Armey's explanation, saying "I turned to my own expert, my mother, who reports that in 59 years of marriage, no one ever introduced her as Elsie Fag."

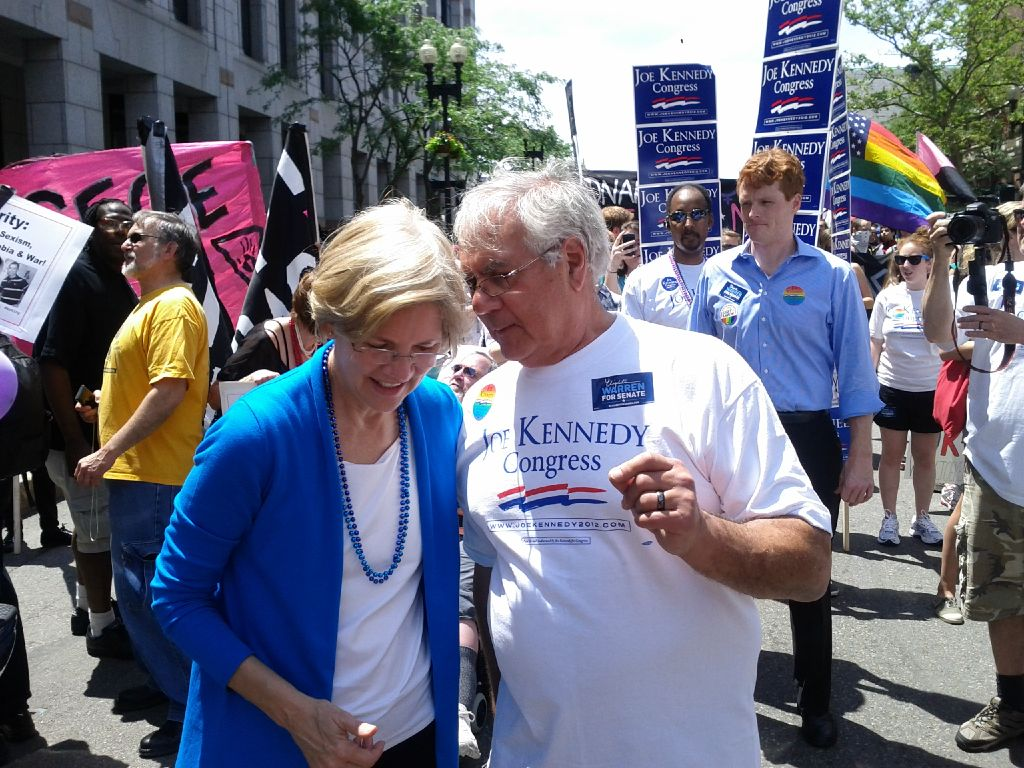
Frank with Elizabeth Warren during the 2012 Boston Pride Parade

In 2006, Frank and incoming House Speaker Nancy Pelosi were accused by Rep. John Hostettler (R-IN) of having a "radical homosexual agenda"; Frank responded "I do have things I would like to see adopted on behalf of LGBT people: they include the right to marry the individual of our choice; the right to serve in the military to defend our country; and the right to a job based solely on our own qualifications. I acknowledge that this is an agenda, but I do not think that any self-respecting radical in history would have considered advocating people's rights to get married, join the army, and earn a living as a terribly inspiring revolutionary platform."

Frank's stance on outing gay Republicans has been called the "Frank Rule" whereby a closeted person who uses her or his power, position, or notoriety to hurt LGBT people can be outed. The issue became relevant during the Mark Foley scandal of 2006, during which Frank clarified his position on HBO's Real Time with Bill Maher: "I think there's a right to privacy. But the right to privacy should not be a right to hypocrisy. And people who want to demonize other people shouldn't then be able to go home and close the door and do it themselves."

In February 2009, Frank was one of three openly gay members of Congress, along with Tammy Baldwin of Wisconsin and Jared Polis of Colorado. In April 2009, Frank was named in the LGBT magazine Out's "Annual Power 50 List", landing at the top spot.

In 2006, the Human Rights Campaign scored him at 100% indicating a pro-gay-rights stance.

In May 2026, Frank said that the Democratic Party should step back from transgender issues while also believing "that's the approach the transgender community should take to male-to-female transgenders playing in women's sports. That's very controversial. Other issues are, I think more important, but also less toxic. Like getting good medical care, guaranteeing that to people. Guaranteeing people the right to designate their genders."

=== Crime ===
In 2000, Frank was rated at 89% by Citizens United for Rehabilitation of Errants, indicating pro-rehabilitation crime votes. He co-sponsored "Innocence Protection Act of 2001" (H.R. 912, S.486) to "reduce the risk that innocent persons may be executed [by examining DNA evidence more thoroughly]" and the "National Death Penalty Moratorium Act of 2001" (H.R.1038, S.233) to limit capital punishment until the National Commission on the Death Penalty reviewed the "fairness of the imposition of the death penalty". In 2001, he also co-sponsored the "Local Law Enforcement Hate Crimes Prevention Act" (01-HR1343) to "provide Federal assistance to States and local jurisdictions to prosecute hate crimes." Frank co-sponsored the "Recidivism Reduction and Second Chance Act of 2007" to reduce recidivism. (this became Public Law No: 110-199).

=== Drugs ===
In 2001, Frank authored the States' Rights to Medical Marijuana Act (H.R. 2592), an attempt to stop the federal government from preempting state medical marijuana laws. He consistently voted for the bipartisan Hinchey–Rohrabacher amendment, annually proposed by Maurice Hinchey (D-NY) and Dana Rohrabacher (R-CA), to prohibit the Justice Department from prosecuting individuals complying with state medical cannabis laws. In March 2008, he proposed the Personal Use of Marijuana by Responsible Adults Act of 2008 (HR 5843), which would have legalized at the federal level small amounts of the drug, but which died in committee during the 110th Congress. On June 18, 2009, he re-introduced the bill as the Personal Use of Marijuana by Responsible Adults Act of 2009 (HR 2943). On June 23, 2011, Frank introduced the Ending Federal Marijuana Prohibition Act to remove marijuana from the Controlled Substances Act. Commenting on legislation to remove federal criminal penalties for possession of small amounts of marijuana for personal use, Frank stated "In a free society a large degree of human activity is none of the government's business. We should make criminal what's going to hurt other people and other than that we should leave it to people to make their own choices." In 2003, he was rated "A" by Vote Hemp, indicating a pro-hemp voting record. In 2006, he was rated "+30" by NORML, indicating a pro-drug-reform stance. In 2007, he co-sponsored the "Drug Sentencing Reform & Kingpin Trafficking Act" ((S.1711) 07-S1711) to "target cocaine kingpins and address sentencing disparity between crack and powder cocaine". In 2008, Frank sponsored "Removing Impediments to Students Education" (RISE) ((H.R.5157) 08-HR5157) to allow rehabilitated drug offenders to get student loans.

In 2009, Frank signed the "Community AIDS and Hepatitis Prevention Act" (HR 179 2009-H179) to "use Federal funds for syringe exchange programs for purposes of reducing the transmission of bloodborne pathogens, including HIV and viral hepatitis" and the Industrial Hemp Farming Act of 2009 (H.R.1866 2009-H1866) to "grant each state regulating authority for the growing and processing of industrial hemp."

=== Economic issues ===
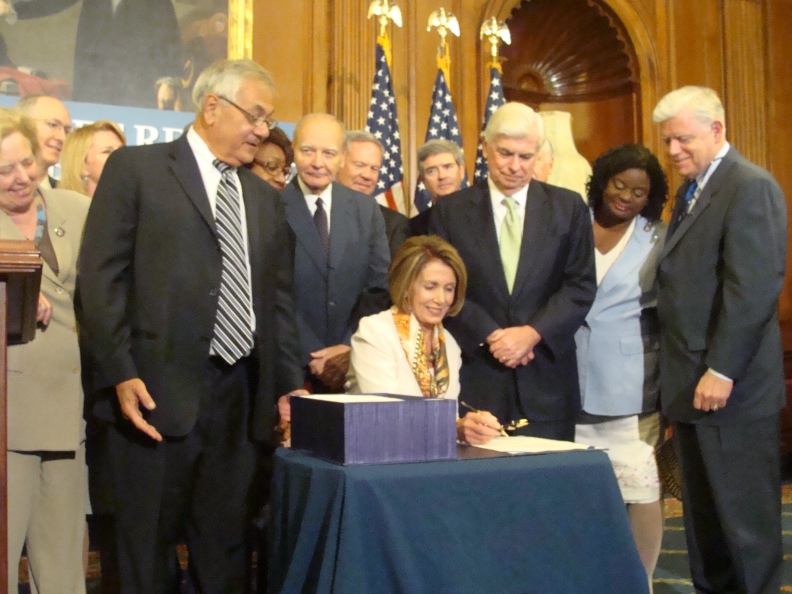
Frank alongside Speaker Nancy Pelosi and U.S. Senator Chris Dodd at the enrollment ceremony for the Wall Street Reform and Consumer Protection Act, June 2010

Frank was a member of the Congressional Internet Caucus established in 1996 to "promoting growth and advancement of the Internet and advance the United States' world leadership in the digital world". In 2001, he co-sponsored the "Anti-Spamming Act" (01-HR718) to protect people and businesses from "unsolicited and unwanted electronic mail". In 2006, Frank voted for the "Communications, Opportunity, Promotion, and Enhancement Act" (Bill HR 5252 Amendment 987) to "establish "network neutrality" (non-tiered Internet)." In 2008, Frank voted against the "FISA Amendments Act" (Bill HR6304) which would give retroactive immunity for those involved in the NSA warrantless surveillance controversy. That same year, he co-sponsored overturning FCC approval of media consolidation (S.J.RES.28&H.J.RES.79 2008-SJR28).

=== Environment ===
In 1993, Frank co-sponsored "Safe Drinking Water Act Amendments" (H.R.3392) to regulate more contaminants under the Clean Water Act. In 2001, he co-sponsored the "National Forest Protection and Restoration Act" (H.R.1494) to "prohibiting commercial logging on Federal public lands". In 2003, he was rated 95% by the League of Conservation Voters, indicating pro-environment votes. In 2007, he co-sponsored the "Great Cats and Rare Canids Act" (H.R.1464) to "provide financial resources and to foster international cooperation for promoting conservation of rare felids & canids". In the same year, he co-sponsored the "Animal Fighting Prohibition Enforcement Act" (S.261/H.R.137) to "strengthen prohibitions against animal fighting".

=== Military ===
In 1996, Frank co-sponsored the "Federal Law Enforcement Dependents Assistance Act" (H.R.4111. Became Public Law No: 104–238.) "to provide educational assistance to the dependents of Federal law enforcement officials who are killed or disabled in the performance of their duties." In 2001, Frank co-sponsored "the MX missile Stand-Down Act" (01-HR2718) to take fifty LGM-118 Peacekeeper missiles off of high-alert status as well as the "Landmine Elimination and Victim Assistance Act" (01-HR948). As of December 2003, Frank had an 89% rating by Peace Action, indicating a pro-peace voting record. In 2005, he co-sponsored "Rail Security Act" (S.1379/H.R.153) (05-S1379) giving higher priority to rail transportation security. In 2008, he co-sponsored the "Veterans Suicide Study Act" ( (S.2899/H.R.4204) 08-S2899) designed to study and address suicides among veterans. Frank advocated for a 25-percent reduction in the overall Military budget of the United States. "The math is compelling: if we do not make reductions approximating 25 percent of the military budget starting fairly soon, it will be impossible to continue to fund an adequate level of domestic activity ... ," wrote Frank. He claimed that such a significant reduction would have no effect on the United States' ability to defend itself. "If," he said, "beginning one year from now, we were to cut military spending by 25 percent from its projected levels, we would still be immeasurably stronger than any combination of nations with whom we might be engaged." Frank supported having fewer F-35 Joint Strike Fighter planes, but also supported a $3-billion backup engine project that the Pentagon does not want. Frank told MSNBC's Keith Olbermann that he actually wanted to cut the entire F-35 program, but as long as military spending continued, he would fight for his district's share of it.

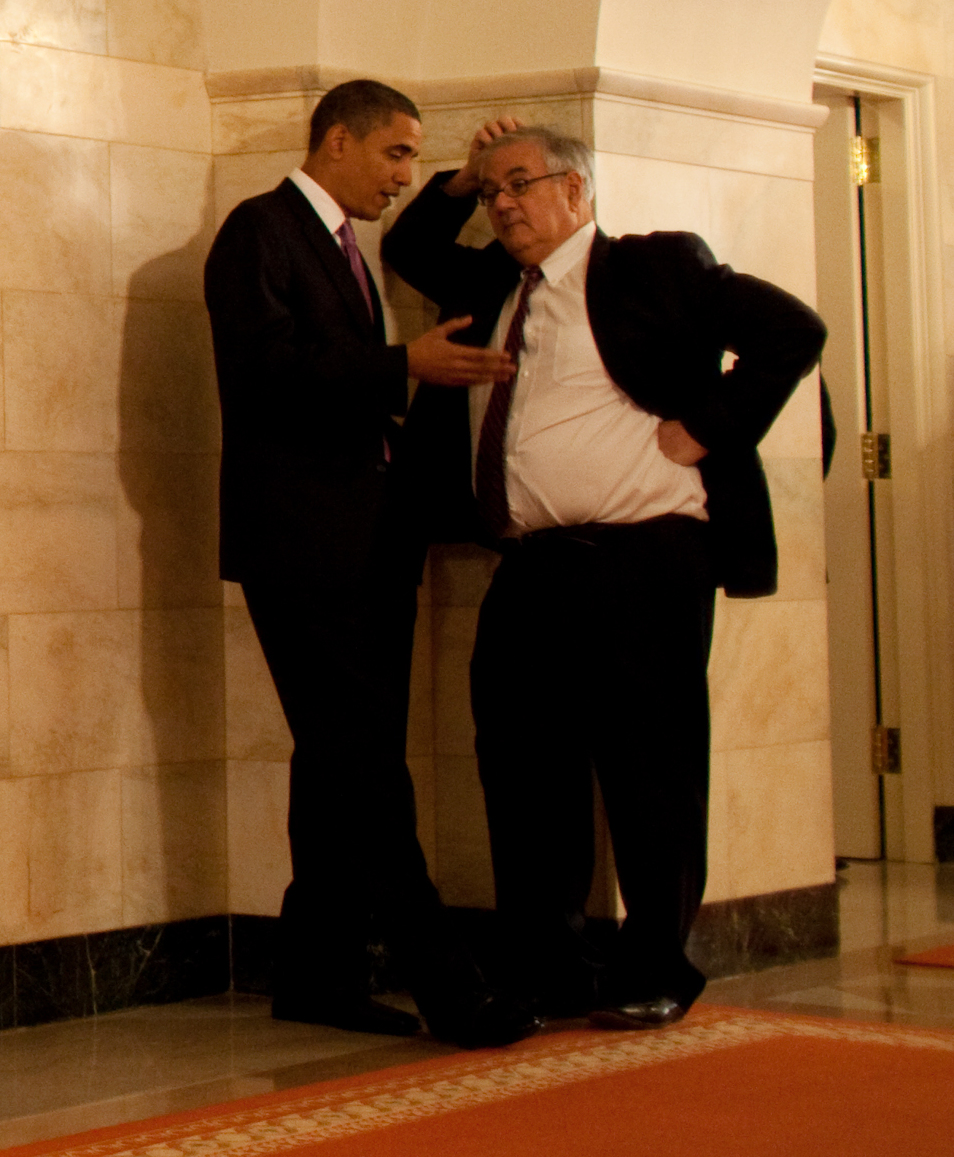
Frank with President Barack Obama at the White House, January 2010

=== Online gambling ===
Frank partnered with Ron Paul in support of online gambling rights. In 2006, both strongly opposed H.R. 4777, the Internet Gambling Prohibition and Enforcement Act, and H.R. 4411, the Goodlatte-Leach Internet Gambling Prohibition Act. To restore online gambling rights, in 2007, Frank sponsored H.R. 2046, the Internet Gambling Regulation and Enforcement Act. This bill would have established licensing and regulation of online gaming sites. It provided for age verification and protections for compulsive gamblers. In 2008, he and Paul introduced H.R. 5767, the Payment Systems Protection Act, a bill that sought to place a moratorium on enforcement of the Unlawful Internet Gambling Enforcement Act of 2006 while the United States Treasury Department and the Federal Reserve defined "unlawful Internet gambling". As a result of these efforts, Frank (who did not gamble) was praised by poker players and online gamblers, including many Republicans.

=== Relations with Israel ===
Frank was a strong supporter of the State of Israel. "The Israeli government has been a wholly democratic one from the beginning," he said in a lecture to students. "It is one of the freest democracies in the world". He attributed the primary reason for Israel's long war to his belief that Palestinians are unwilling to make concessions.

In August 2009, a confidential memo written by the consul general of Israel in Boston, Nadav Tamir, was leaked to the Israeli media. In the memo, Tamir said that Israel's dealings with the Obama administration on differences over settlements were eroding U.S. support. After Tamir was reprimanded by the Israeli government, Frank defended Tamir in a letter sent to Israeli Prime Minister Benjamin Netanyahu, in which Frank wrote: "I was sorry to learn that he (Tamir) is being criticized because of his accurate reporting of significant (negative) sentiment in the United States ... If the people who work for me did not give me the kind of straightforward, thoughtful analysis that the consul is providing, even if it wasn't the most welcome news, that failure — not the information — would cause me unhappiness."

In May 2026, shortly before his death, Frank reversed his stance toward Israel and criticized the leadership of Prime Minister Benjamin Netanyahu. He said that the U.S. should end its weapons sales to Israel as long as Netanyahu does not "relieve Palestinian suffering", and expressed support for Netanyahu's political opposition.

== Post-House career ==
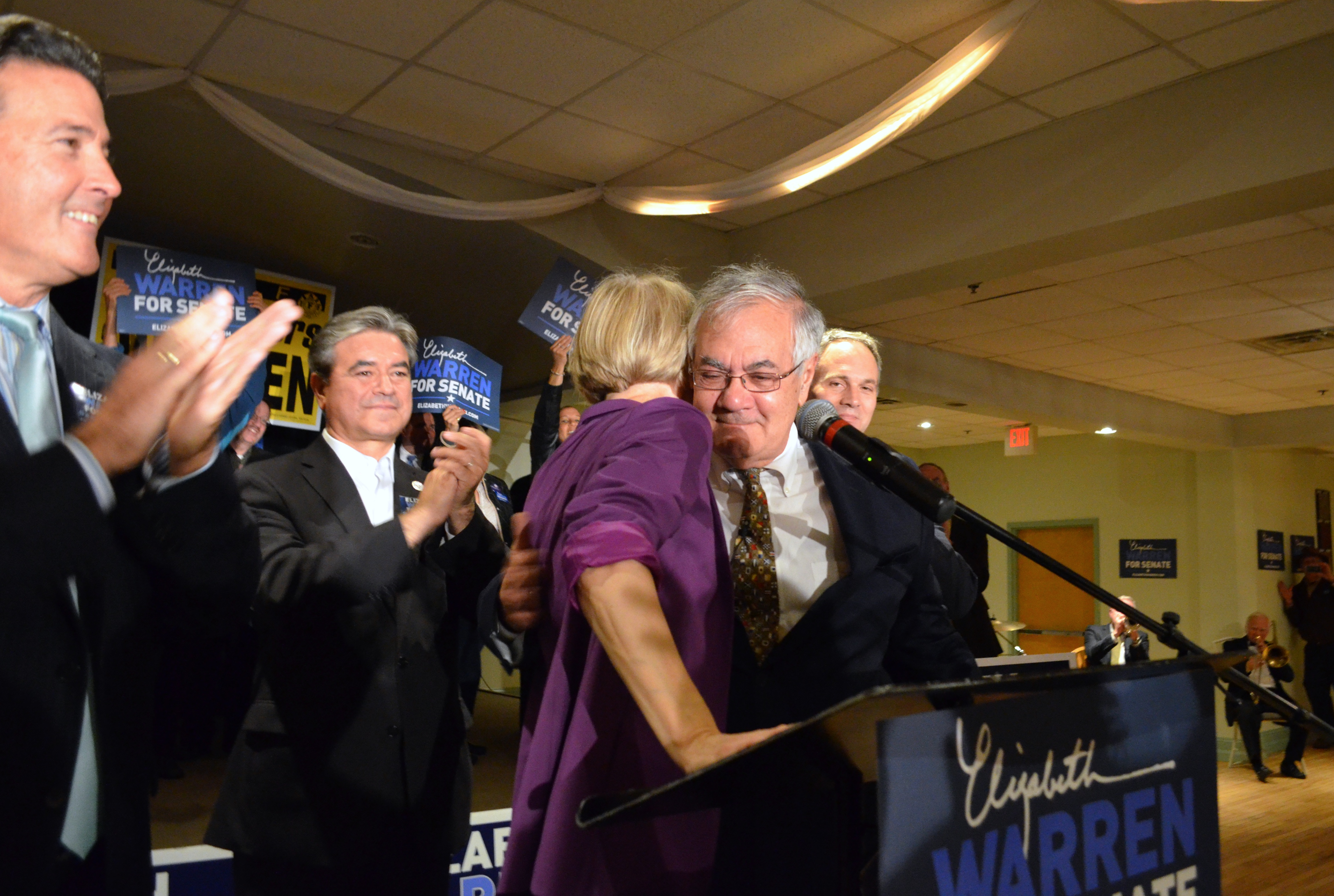
Frank endorsing Elizabeth Warren for the U.S. Senate, November 2012

In the wake of the fiscal cliff legislation at the start of 2013, Frank stated that he was interested in the interim appointment that Governor Deval Patrick was expected to make to fill John Kerry's U.S. Senate seat once the latter resigned to serve as United States Secretary of State. Frank had initially said he was not interested in the seat, but went on to change his mind, noting that "that [fiscal cliff] deal now means that February, March, and April are going to be among the most important months in American financial history". He said he would not run in the special election that would be held to fill the seat for the remainder of Kerry's term.

Frank joined the board of directors of the New York-based Signature Bank on June 17, 2015.

In 2018, Frank was featured on Sacha Baron Cohen's spoof comedy series Who Is America?, discussing the Donald Trump Access Hollywood tape and the Pizzagate conspiracy theory with Baron Cohen's alter ego Billy Wayne Ruddick Jr. Frank eventually walked out of the interview.

On December 8, 2022, Frank, despite being retired from the U.S. Congress, was present on the floor of the House of Representatives when the Respect for Marriage Act was successfully passed.

== Personal life ==
Frank resided in a studio apartment complex in Newton, Massachusetts, and in Ogunquit, Maine. His husband, Jim Ready, is a surfing enthusiast whom Frank met during a gay political fundraiser in Maine. On July 7, 2012, Frank married Ready at the Boston Marriott Newton in suburban Boston. Frank's net worth was estimated by OpenSecrets to be between $619,024 and $1,510,000. Frank chose not to participate in the Congressional pension system. He said he did not believe that he would live long enough after retirement to reap benefits over contributions, and that he was convinced that he would remain single and have no beneficiary. His sister, Ann Lewis, served as a senior adviser for the Hillary Clinton 2008 presidential campaign.

=== Religion ===
Subsequently, after leaving office, I half jokingly objected when Bill Maher, one of my favorite TV hosts, asked if I felt uncomfortable sitting next to a pot-smoking atheist on the set of his show. I replied that that there were two of us on that stage who fit those categories. The media reached the conclusion that I had come out as an atheist. In fact, I am not an atheist. I don't know enough to have any firm view on the subject, and it has never seemed important to me. I have had a life-long aversion to wrestling with questions that I know I can never answer. My tolerance for intellectual uncertainty is very low.

On August 3, 2013, Frank expressed sympathy with the host Bill Maher's atheism on the television program Real Time with Bill Maher. In his biography, however, Frank stated unequivocally that he was not an atheist, and was uncomfortable expressing firm views on questions for which he was unable to provide an answer. Frank's agnosticism led him to resolve—if he had been appointed as interim senator—to take the oath of office on the United States Constitution, rather than the Bible.

For most of his life and his entire congressional career, Frank was known as a Jew. Frank continued to identify strongly with the Jewish community, and was careful throughout his career that his agnosticism did not reflect negatively on other Jews. For example, when he stopped going to temple services on the High Holy Days, he was careful to remain at home and out of the public eye so that other Jews would not be criticized using his example.

In May 2014, the American Humanist Association awarded Frank the Humanist of the Year and during his acceptance speech he spoke about his personal beliefs and the complexities of working in government. He talked primarily about the politicized case of Terri Schiavo and the public's evolving view about government intrusion into personal healthcare decisions.

That notion, that there was a religious obligation to intervene in human affairs, angered most of the American people. You've got to show people what the implications are of the view that religion should govern our public affairs, as opposed to being merely a personal guide.

=== Sexuality ===
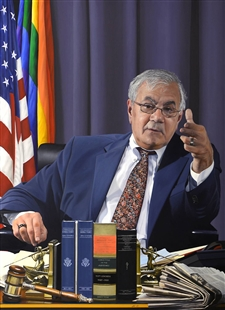
Frank's official portrait in the Collection of the U.S. House of Representatives

According to Stuart Weisberg's 2009 biography Barney Frank: The Story of America's Only Left-Handed, Gay, Jewish Congressman, Frank dated women in an effort to deny his homosexuality. His last romance with a woman was a nearly two-year-long affair with Irish-American Catholic Kathleen Sullivan, a Boston School Committee member and the daughter of former New England Patriots owner Billy Sullivan, that began in 1974. When the two split up, at Frank's instigation, he admitted to her that he was gay. He was still closeted publicly. According to Frank, he "realized it was crazy" to try to have a romance with someone he cared for but was not sexually compatible with due to his homosexuality. "That was the last effort to avoid being gay," Weisberg quotes Frank as saying. Frank never again dated a woman. In 2015, in an interview with Boston magazine, Frank said it was unfair to Sullivan to date her with him being gay.

Frank started coming out as gay to friends before he ran for Congress and came out publicly on May 30, 1987, "prompted in part by increased media interest in his private life" and the death of Stewart McKinney, "a closeted bisexual Republican representative from Connecticut". Frank told The Washington Post after McKinney's death that there was "An unfortunate debate about 'Was he or wasn't he? Didn't he or did he?' I said to myself, I don't want that to happen to me." (Note: Frank, who was elected to the House in 1980, was the first gay congressional representative to come out on his own. Congressman Gerry Studds had been the only openly gay federal legislator, having survived the revelation during a 1983 Congressional sex scandal that he had had a relationship with a seventeen-year-old male page a decade earlier.) Frank's announcement had little impact on his electoral prospects.

Shortly after coming out, Frank met and began dating Herb Moses, an economist and LGBT activist; their relationship lasted for eleven years until an amicable break-up in July 1998. Moses, who was an executive at Fannie Mae from 1991 to 1998, was the first partner of an openly gay member of Congress to receive spousal benefits, and the two were considered "Washington's most powerful and influential gay couple".

=== Illness and death ===
On April 28, 2026, it was announced that Frank had entered into hospice care in Ogunquit, Maine, for congestive heart failure. He died less than a month later, on May 19, at the age of 86.

Following his death, The New York Times called Frank a "gay pioneer" who helped normalize being gay while in public office. NBC News noted that Frank was a "champion" of Wall Street reform, while also being a "trailblazer" in the LGBTQ community. The Washington Post credited Frank as a "gay rights hero", while Axios called him the "architect of bank rules" and a "driving force" of Wall Street reforms following the 2008 financial crisis.

== Electoral history ==
Massachusetts's 4th congressional district: Results 1980–2010
Year	Democrat	Votes	%	Republican	Votes	%	Third Party	Party	Votes	%	Fourth Party	Party	Votes	%
1980	Barney Frank	103,466	52%	Richard Jones	95,898	48%								
1982	Barney Frank	151,305	60%	Margaret Heckler	82,804	40%								
1984	Barney Frank	172,903	74%	Jim Forte	60,121	26%								
1986	Barney Frank	134,387	89%	No candidate			Thomas DeVisscher	Independent	16,857	11%				
1988	Barney Frank	169,729	70%	Debra Tucker	71,661	30%								
1990	Barney Frank	143,473	66%	John Soto	75,454	34%								
1992	Barney Frank	182,633	68%	Edward McCormick	70,665	26%	Luke Lumina	Independent Voters	13,670	5%	Dennis Ingalls	Freedom for LaRouche	2,797	1%
1994	Barney Frank	168,942	99%	No candidate			Others		853	1%				
1996	Barney Frank	183,844	72%	Jonathan Raymond	72,701	28%								
1998	Barney Frank	148,340	98%	No candidate			Others		2,380	2%				
2000	Barney Frank	200,638	75%	Martin Travis	56,553	21%	David Euchner	Libertarian	10,553	4%				
2002	Barney Frank	166,125	99%	No candidate			Others		1,691	1%				
2004	Barney Frank	219,260	78%	No candidate			Charles Morse	Independent	62,293	22%				
2006	Barney Frank	196,513	98%	No candidate			Others		2,730	1%				
2008	Barney Frank	203,032	68%	Earl Sholley	75,571	25%	Susan Allen	Independent	19,848	7%				
2010	Barney Frank	126,194	54%	Sean Bielat	101,517	43%	Susan Allen	Independent	3,445	1%	Donald Jordan	Tax Revolt Independent	2,873	1%

== Bibliography ==
- Speaking Frankly: What's Wrong with the Democrats and How to Fix It (1992)
- "American Immigration Law: A Case Study in the Effective Use of the Political Process" in J. D'Emilio (ed.), Creating Change: Sexuality, Public Policy, and Civil Rights. St. Martin's Press (2000) (pp 208–235)
- Frank: A Life in Politics from the Great Society to Same-Sex Marriage (2015)
- "The Economic and Political Implications of the Dodd-Frank Act" in S. O'Halloran & T. Groll (Eds.), After the Crash: Financial Crises and Regulatory Responses, Columbia University Press (2019), pp. 261–280.
- The Hard Path to Unity: Why We Must Reform the Left to Rescue Democracy (2026)

== Filmography ==
- Let's Get Frank (2003) by Bart Everly (executive produced by Jonathan Van Meter, co-produced by Ruth Rachel Anderson-Avraham), Library of Congress (LOC) Catalog
- Compared to What: The Improbable Journey of Barney Frank (2014) by Sheila Canavan and Michael Chandler, IMDb

== See also ==
- LGBT culture in Boston
- List of atheists in politics and law
- List of Jewish members of the United States Congress
- List of LGBT members of the United States Congress
- List of federal political scandals in the United States
- List of federal political sex scandals in the United States
- List of United States representatives expelled, censured, or reprimanded

== Notes ==
U.S. House of Representatives
Preceded by Robert Drinan	Member of the U.S. House of Representatives from Massachusetts's 4th congressional district 1981–2013	Succeeded by Joe Kennedy
Preceded by John LaFalce	Ranking Member of the House Financial Services Committee; 2003–2007	Succeeded by Spencer Bachus
Preceded by Mike Oxley	Chair of the House Financial Services Committee; 2007–2011	Succeeded by Spencer Bachus
New office	Chair of the Congressional Equality Caucus; 2008–2013; Served alongside: Tammy Baldwin	Succeeded by Jared Polis
Preceded by Spencer Bachus	Ranking Member of the House Financial Services Committee; 2011–2013	Succeeded by Maxine Waters
