= Industrial Hemp Farming Act of 2005 =

The Industrial Hemp Farming Act of 2005 was a bill introduced as H.R. 3037 in the United States House of Representatives on June 22, 2005. The bill proposes "to amend the Controlled Substances Act to exclude industrial hemp from the definition of marijuana, and for other purposes". Submitted by Ron Paul, Pete Stark, Jim McDermott and Raul Grijalva, the bill was referred to the Committee on Energy and Commerce and the United States House Committee on the Judiciary. On July 1, 2005, Energy and Commerce referred the bill to the Subcommittee on Health.

H.R. 3037 was not passed. In 2009 Ron Paul (R-Texas) and Barney Frank (D-Massachusetts) proposed a similar bill, H.R. 1866, commonly known as the Industrial Hemp Farming Act of 2009, urging fellow legislators to reconsider the definition of marijuana.
