= Nadav Tamir =

Israeli diplomat

- נדב תמיר
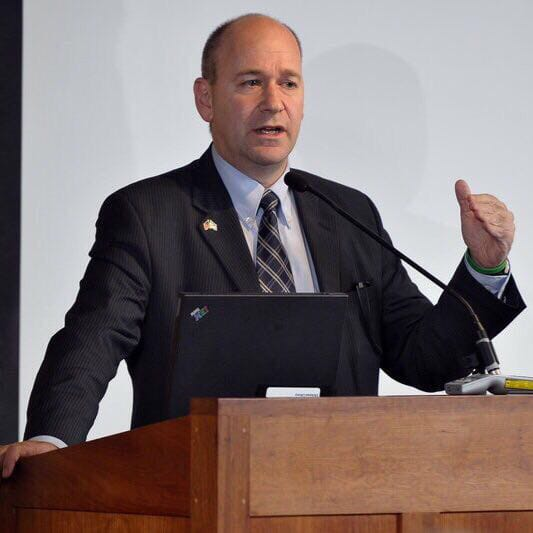

Director of international affairs, Peres Center for Peace, and Peres & Associates
- Incumbent
- Assumed office July 2014

Personal details
- Born: August 27, 1961 (age 65) Manara, Israel
- Education: Hebrew University of Jerusalem

Nadav Tamir (Hebrew: נדב תמיר; born August 27, 1961) is a former Israeli diplomat. He is currently J Street Israel's new Executive Director and a senior advisor for governmental and international affairs in the Peres Center for Peace.

Tamir served as a Political Officer in the Embassy of Israel in the United States, as well as in major administrative duties in the Israeli Ministry of Foreign Affairs, and was the Consul General of Israel to New England in Boston, MA. Prior to his current position, he was the Policy Adviser to the then President of the State of Israel, Shimon Peres.

== Biography ==
Born and raised in kibbutz Manara in the Upper Galilee, Israel, he volunteered for a Service Year, like most youngsters of the kibbutz, before enlisting to the IDF. Tamir holds a rank of a major in Reserve Duty in the Armor Corps of the IDF. He fought in the First Lebanon War, and took part in the Battle of Jezzine (1982). Later on he was a trainer in the corps Officers Academy, and was a Company Commander. He was asked to stay for a career in the combat units of the military, but he preferred to retire and join the Diplomatic service.

== Diplomatic service ==
Tamir joined the Ministry of Foreign Affairs in 1993. He became Policy Assistant to the Minister of Foreign Affairs in 1994, under ministers Shimon Peres, Ehud Barak, and David Levy. He was praised by all three for his excellent work. In 1997 he was appointed Political Officer at the Embassy of Israel in Washington D.C. In 2001 he returned to Israel to become adviser to the director general of the Ministry.

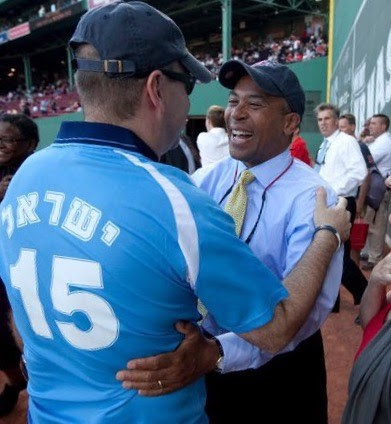
Nadav Tamir as a Consul General of Israel in Boston, with Governor of Massachusetts, Deval Patrick

=== Consul General ===
In 2006 Tamir was appointed Consul General of Israel to New England at the Consulate General of Israel in Boston, MA. He served in this position right after the Second Lebanon War, the IDF operation in the Gaza Strip, and during the time of the later Operation Cast Lead. During this time, disagreements between the Government of Israel and the Obama Administration have grown dramatically, regarding the freeze of the Peace process, and Israel's policy on settlements expansion. Tamir has worked tirelessly to explain the Israeli policy to the American public and to the Administration, although in many cases he thought that his government stance was wrong and was defeating the Israeli interest. He received vast praises from the Jewish community leaders, leading academia researchers who specialize in the Middle East, as well as top government officials. Among other activities, Tamir created good ties with US Congress members, and helped in advancing legislation in crucial issues relating to the security of Israel, such as the nuclear program of Iran.

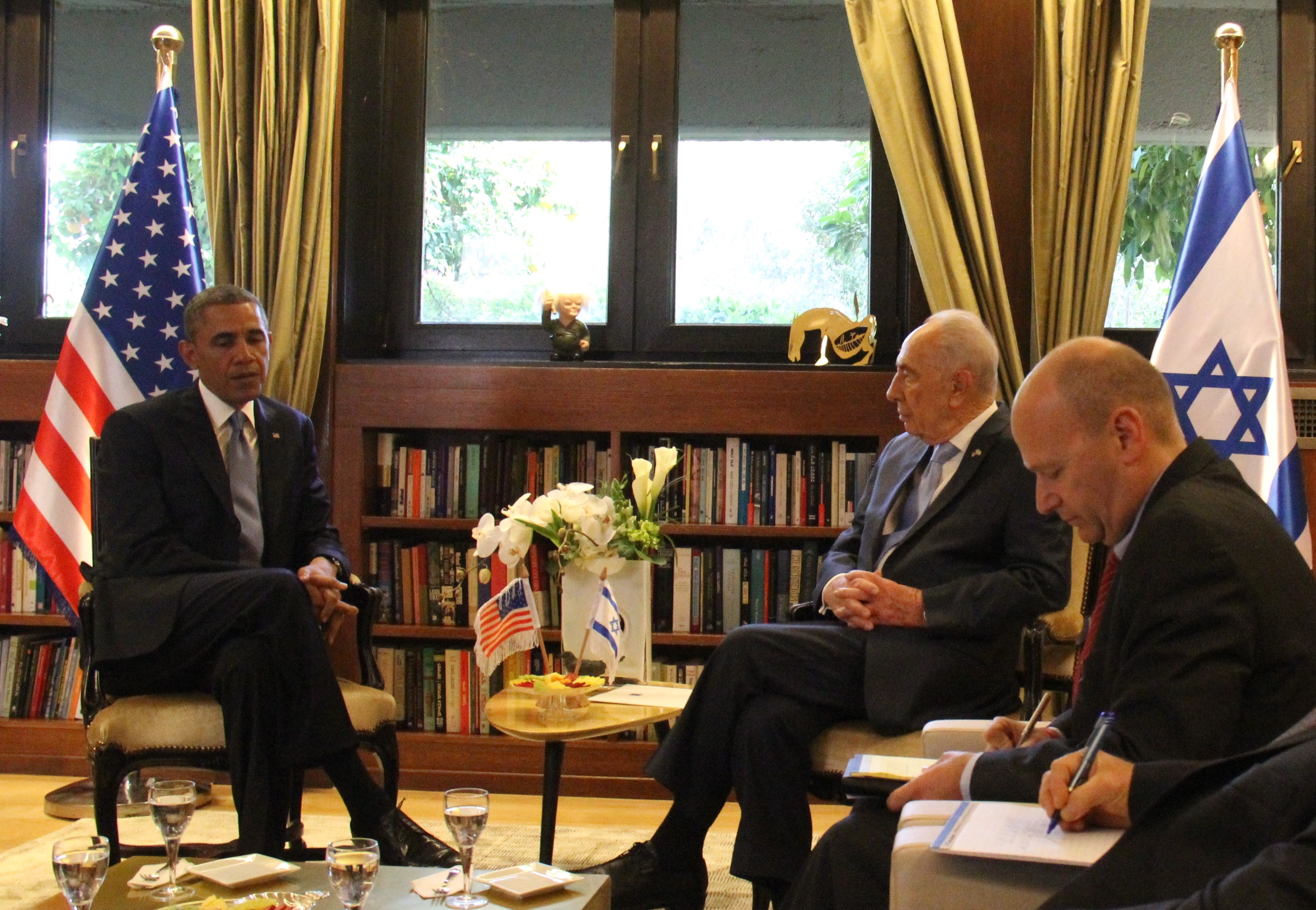
Nadav Tamir with presidents Shimon Peres and Barack Obama in Israel, March 2013

=== The Critical Memo incident ===
Tamir became known to the public following a three-page memo, which he wrote for the eyes of Foreign Ministry officials only. In this letter, Tamir criticized the handling of the relations with the US administration. Later on, it appeared that this was just a pioneering letter, followed by other such documents written by Israeli ambassadors to leading western countries.

Tamir wrote the letter in the end of his third year as consul. He did this after he realized, as he said, of the negative atmosphere towards Israel in the Administration, which was the result of mistaken and un-diplomatic handling of the interactions between the governments. Tamir claimed that it was his duty, as official Israeli representative, to be the messenger of such phenomena which he thought were causing severe damage to Israel's foreign relations, so that the Israeli cabinet would be aware of some results of its policy and actions. He said that it was not his intention to criticize the policy itself of the Israeli government, but the way it was communicated.

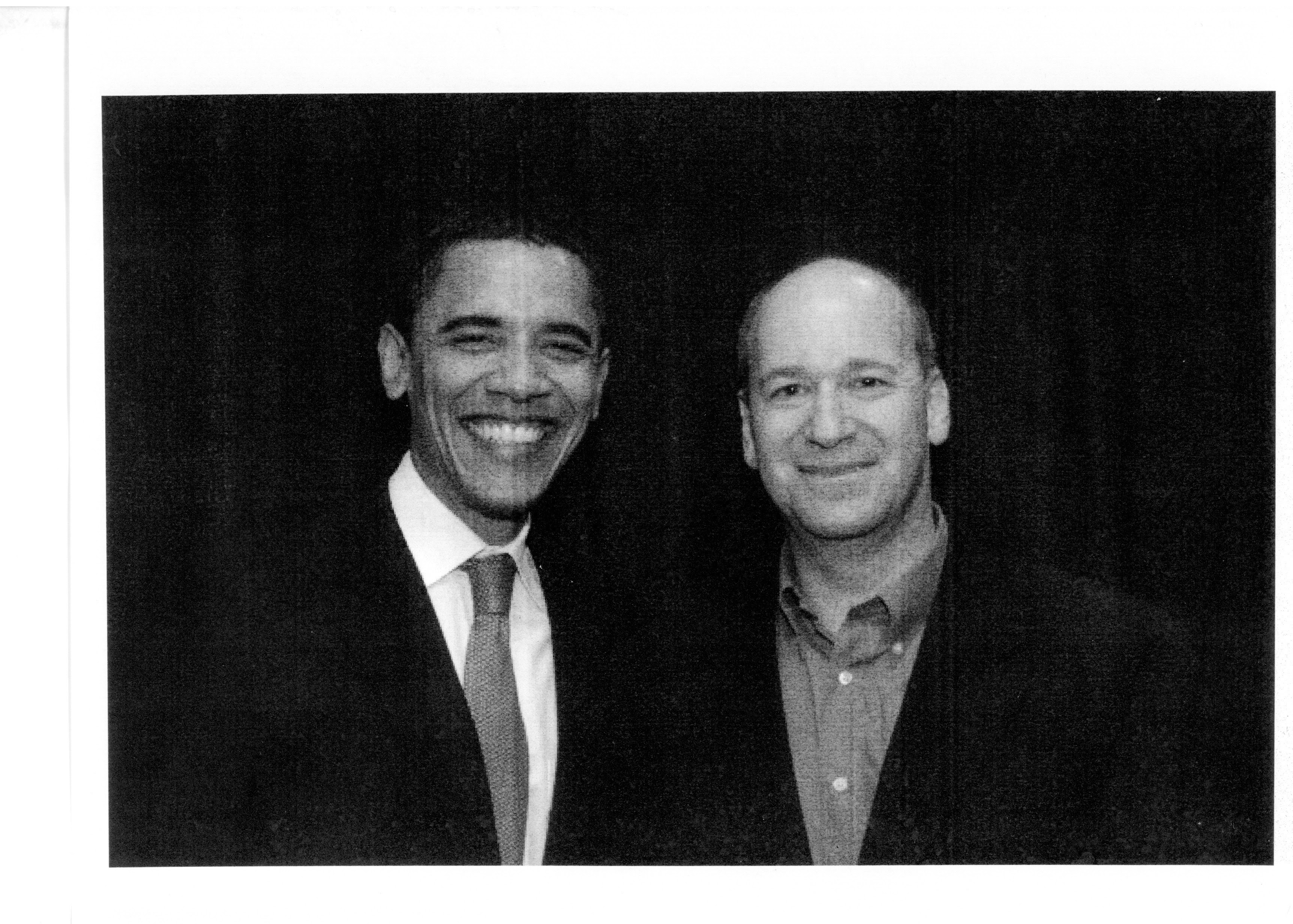
Nadav Tamir with the President of the United States, Barack Obama

The letter was leaked (not by Tamir) and was made public on August 6, 2010, in Israel's Channel 10 Television. The publication stirred harsh criticism, and some called to recall Tamir. On order from the Minister, Avigdor Lieberman, Tamir was called in for a clarification meeting with the Ministry's director general, Yossi Gal. Tamir claimed in the meeting that the intent of the letter was to point out a problematic situation with the Administration, which could be better handled. He did not intend to make it public, he claimed. To the point of the matter, Tamir thought that the manner by which the relations were handled could jeopardize the intimacy of relations which had been built in a course of many years; and defeat the principal of leaving the Israel topic outside and above the US policies, which would also diminish the relation of the American Jewry with the State of Israel. Some people familiar with the field expressed the opinion, that those processes have actually occurred.

The Prime Minister's office officially stated that "The letter is not worth a response"; However, a top official of the office said, off the record, that the letter was written with negligence, that it expressed a private political opinion by the writer, whose intention was to hurt the State of Israel, and that it was a shame that it had been written. The leaders of the Jewish communities in the New England area published letters supporting Tamir, and asked that he retain his position. US government officials also supported Tamir. Indeed, Tamir fulfilled his term as consul general.

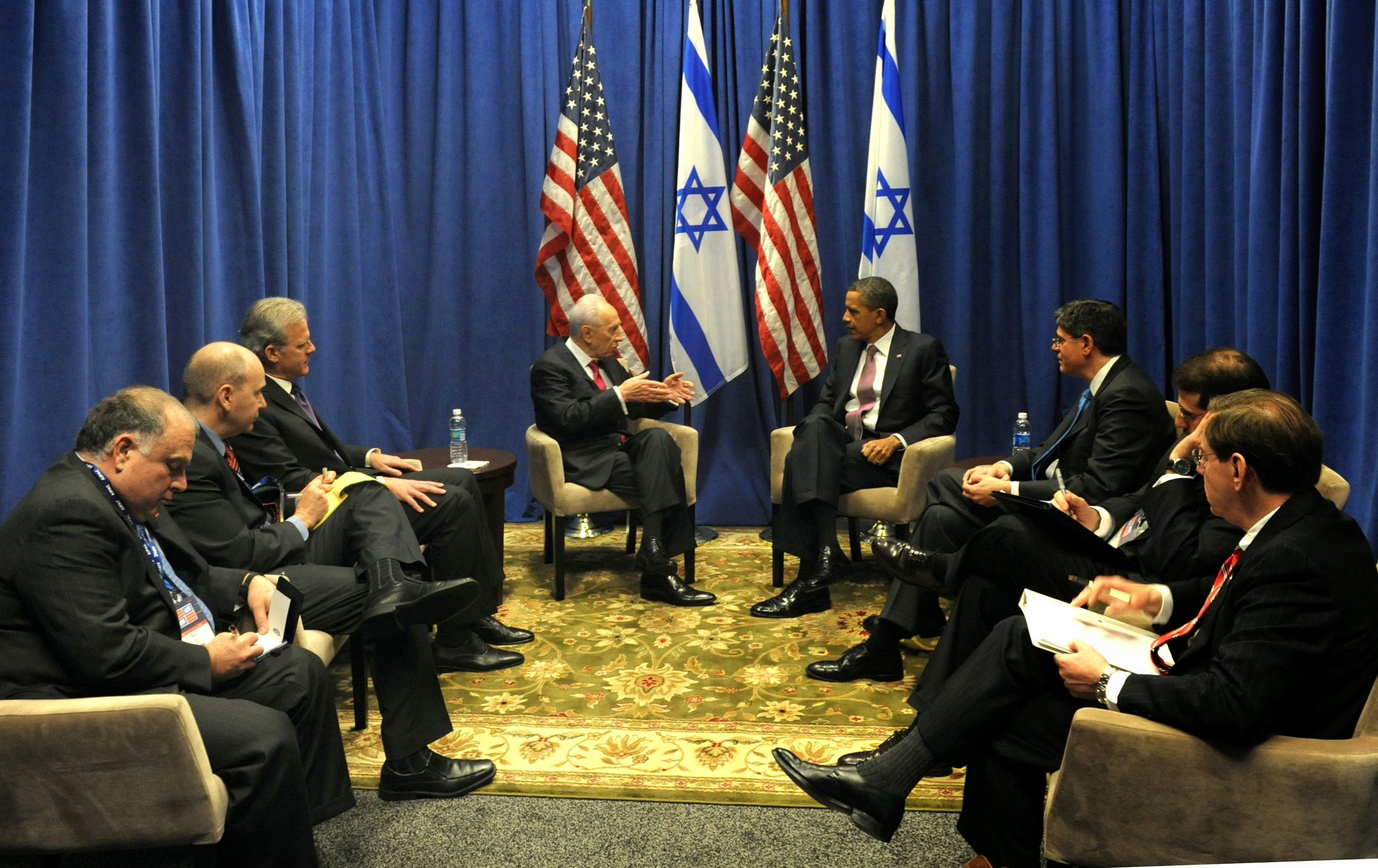
Nadav Tamir at the AIPAC Committee, 2013, with presidents Shimon Peres and Barack Obama

=== Relations with the Jewish community ===
Tamir has acted to strengthen ties between Israel and the local Jewry. He initiated a new approach for connecting the two bodies, through out-of-politics channels, around what Tamir called "Jewish Peopleness", and the image of "The Big Tent" which contains all community members, including those who have conflicts with the Israeli government. Some of the community leaders stated that Tamir made the consulate a central factor in advancing economic activities between Israel and the New England states, which are national leaders in Life Sciences and Hi-Tech industries.

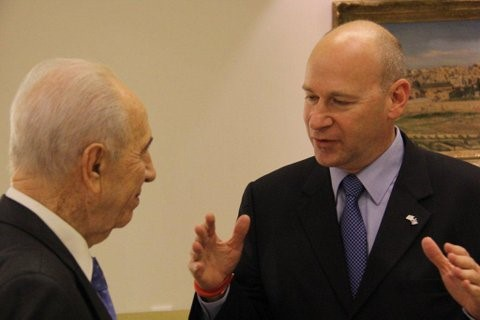
Nadav Tamir advising to the President of Israel, Shimon Peres

=== Adviser to the President ===
After completing his duty as consul, Tamir joined the Policy Planning unit of the Foreign Ministry in Jerusalem. Today Tamir is known as one of the top experts in Israel on Israel–United States relations.

In his position as the President's adviser, Tamir was responsible for the diplomatic meetings of the President in Israel and abroad, and he advised the President on topics related to foreign policy, and relations between Israel and Jewish communities around the world.

== Latest career ==
In 2014, after the retirement of Shimon Peres from the presidential office, Tamir joined Peres & Associates, as the director of international affairs of the firm. Incorporated July 2014. The firm is using the retired president's contacts around the world to benefit Israeli companies which are active in global markets, with the aim to promote peace-related initiatives. The profits of the firm are used for funding peace projects at Peres Center for Peace. Today Nadav Tamir represents the Israeli chapter of J Street.

== Education ==
Tamir earned his B.A. degree in Philosophy and Political science from the Hebrew University of Jerusalem, magna cum laude. In 2004, he received his Master's degree in Public administration from John F. Kennedy School of Government at Harvard University, through the Wexner Foundation program. As of 2015, Tamir is the chairman of the alumni council of the Wexner Israel Fellowship program.

== Public activity ==
Tamir voluntarily serves in a number of public position:

- In 2003, Tamir was chosen as a Wexner Israel Fellow and earned his master's degree in Public Administration from the Kennedy School of Government at Harvard University in 2004. As of 2015, Tamir serves as the chairman of the alumni council of the Wexner Foundation program.
- In 2015 Tamir joined the executive team of the Israeli-Palestinian Business Council.
- Member, executive committee of Mitvim - The Israeli Institute for Regional Foreign Policies
- Member, Steering Committee of the Geneva Initiative

Tamir is married to Ronit, a Ph.D. in dance education, and he has two daughters and a son: Maya, Ido, and Naama.
