= Industrial Hemp Farming Act of 2009 =

Drug control law

The Industrial Hemp Farming Act of 2009 (H.R. 1866), introduced during the 111th United States Congress by House Republican Ron Paul of Texas) and House Democrat Barney Frank of Massachusetts) on April 2, 2009, sought to clarify the differences between marijuana and industrial hemp as well as repeal federal laws that prohibited cultivation of industrial hemp, but only for research facilities of higher education from conducting research.

== History ==
The Marihuana Tax Act of 1937 was the beginning of regulation surrounding the growth of Cannabis in the US. An extremely high tax was placed on marijuana; making it nearly impossible to grow industrial hemp. However, Congress expected the production of industrial hemp to continue, but the Federal Bureau of Narcotics and later the US Drug Enforcement Administration classified industrial hemp in the same category as recreational marijuana, despite the fact that industrial hemp does not produce the same psychoactive effects as marijuana.

President Donald Trump signed the 2018 United States farm bill on December 20, 2018 legally defined hemp as cannabis that had a THC content of .3% or less, and allowed for the commercial cultivation, sale, and marketing of hemp. The hemp industry has grown largely since then, being valued at $739 million dollars in 2025.

United States companies and industries which sell products made with hemp include Dr. Bronner's Magic Soaps, most of the bird seed sold in the U.S., and even the automobile companies Ford and BMW, historically and currently, experimented with hemp materials in their vehicles. Hemp food manufacturers such as French Meadow Bakery, Hempzels, Living Harvest, Nature's Path and Nutiva now make their products from Canadian hemp. These industries will no longer have to import hemp from other countries to produce these products.

National drug control policies opposed this legislation as it was believed that hemp plants could provide cover during cultivation for marijuana plants.

== Ruling of proposed bill ==
This legislation, the Industrial Hemp Farming Act of 2005 and the Industrial Hemp Farming Act of 2007, were introduced, referred to committee, and no additional legislative action was taken.

== Etymology ==
Currently, the word "marijuana" is the accepted spelling. However, "marihuana" was the correct spelling and most commonly used form in early Federal Government of the United States documents. That is why, as stated in the bill, marijuana is spelled "marihuana;" to maintain consistency across government documents.

== See also ==
- Cannabis in the United States
- Legal history of cannabis in the United States
- Gonzales v. Raich
- Medical marijuana
- States' rights
