= Citizens United for Rehabilitation of Errants =

U.S. prisoner support and prison reform organization

Citizens United for Rehabilitation of Errants (CURE) is a United States prisoner support and prison reform organization that was founded by Charles and Pauline Sullivan in San Antonio, Texas, on January 2, 1972. It has supported legislation such as the Second Chance Act and, most famously, the Federal Prison Work Incentive Act.

In August 1985, CURE became a national organization. CURE has a branch devoted to federal prisoners among other things and various state chapters. There is a branch devoted to Florida prisoners and one in Dallas for Texas prisoners. They maintain a Facebook presence. There is also an international CURE.

According to S. D. Williams in the journal Corrections Compendium, "One of the group's problems is that the population for which they lobby (prisoners) does not elicit much sympathy; outsiders frequently do not see the wisdom of giving resources to those who must be in prison."
