= Monse =

American luxury fashion brand

MONSE
- Type: Private
- Industry: Fashion
- Founded: 2015; 11 years ago
- Founder: Laura Kim; Fernando Garcia
- Headquarters: New York, New York, United States
- Website: https://monse.com/

Monse (stylized in uppercase)(Spanish pronunciation: [mon-SAY]) is an American, luxury fashion label founded in 2015 by the fashion designer duo, Laura Kim and Fernando Garcia. The brand specializes in women's ready-to-wear and is inspired by the juxtaposition between masculine and feminine and the deconstruction of classic menswear tailoring.

Monse ready-to-wear collection can be found in major department stores and online retailers such as: Nordstrom, Bergdorf Goodman, Revolve, Farfetch, and Shopbop. The brand's boutique is located at 15 Rivington Street, New York, NY 10002. Services at the boutique include private fittings, custom requests and VIC services.

== History ==
In 2015, co-founders Laura Kim and Fernando Garcia launched Monse and debuted their first collection in New York Fashion Week showcasing the ready-to-wear Spring 2016 collection at the exclusive Norwood Club. Kim and Garcia first met when they were working at Oscar de la Renta as design studio director and principal designer, respectively.

Laura Kim (born is a South Korean fashion designer, born and raised in Seoul, South Korea. Kim went to Pratt Institute and graduated in 2004 with a Bachelor of Fine Arts in fashion design. Kim was first hired as an intern at Oscar de la Renta in 2002 after he discovered her while she was helping his son launch his own fashion line. She later went on to work as his design director for twelve years supervising collection development of fabric design, ready to wear, knitwear, and accessories.

Fernando Garcia (born 1988) is a Dominican fashion designer, born and raised in Santo Domingo, Dominican Republic. Garcia went to The University of Notre Dame to pursue his interests in architecture and graduated with a Bachelor of Science in architecture in 2009. He was introduced to Oscar de la Renta through a mutual friend, and after reviewing Garcia's architectural sketches, the late designer offered him an internship at his fashion house. The internship later led him to his appointment as principal designer, a role he held for six years.

Kim and Garcia were appointed co-creative directors of Oscar de la Renta in 2017 while also designing for Monse. In 2025, they stepped down to focus solely on Monse.

== Brand collaborations ==
In February 2020, Monse worked with Both, a Paris-based rubber footwear brand, to create a capsule collection called Monse x Both Gao. The collection features genderfluid footwear and is paying homage to Wes Andersons' Fantastic Mr. Fox film. The boots were paired with Monse Fall 2020 collection.

In 2022, Monse partnered with Equinox to develop an athleisure capsule collection of nine styles including a bra top, a crop top, and leggings using an electric blue color wave. This collection was sold in select Equinox clubs and online along with other athleisure pieces from Monse's spring collection.

In 2024, Monse collaborated with Shein on their program initiative to support emerging talent and independent artists called Shein X-Monse. Kim and Garcia mentored Oxana Goralczyk, Mathilde Lhomme, Jade Breyon, Allaya Brow, and KL Allen to design and launch a capsule collection. The new collection consisted of dresses, jackets, blouses, pants, and accessories with the highest price point being $65. Shein donated $25,000 to Dress for Success Greater New York City as part of the collaboration agreement.

In 2025, Monse collaborated with Lauren Sanchez to design custom astronaut outfits for Blue Origin NS-31. The designs were worn by Lauren Sanchez, Katy Perry, Aisha Bowe, Kerianne Flynn, Gayle King, and Amanda Nguyễn.

In September 2025, Monse unveiled their first-ever collaboration with Sperry in New York Fashion Show debuting their limited-edition Sperry x Monse Spring/Summer 2026 footwear collection. The collection officially launched in March 2026 in stores and online at Sperry and Monse.

== Celebrity endorsements ==
Sarah Jessica Parker wore a custom, all-white Monse ensemble to the Met Gala in 2016 to fit the theme, Manus x Machina: Fashion in the Age of Technology. Parker also wore another custom Monse dress for the New York City Ballet Fall Fashion Gala. Parker was the first celebrity to wear Monse making her the brand's first "Monse girl".

Other celebrities and notable figures who supported Monse in the early days were Amal Clooney, Selena Gomez, Brie Larson, and Rihanna. Nowadays, Monse can be found on celebrities and notable figures for high-profile functions and red carpet events.

== Awards and accolades ==
Monse was the recipient of the Swarovski Award for Emerging Talent at the CFDA Fashion Awards in 2017. In the same year, Kim and Garcia were also awarded the Fashion Visionary Award by Pratt Institute at its 118th annual show at Spring Studios.
