= Aisha Bowe =

American aerospace engineer (born 1986)

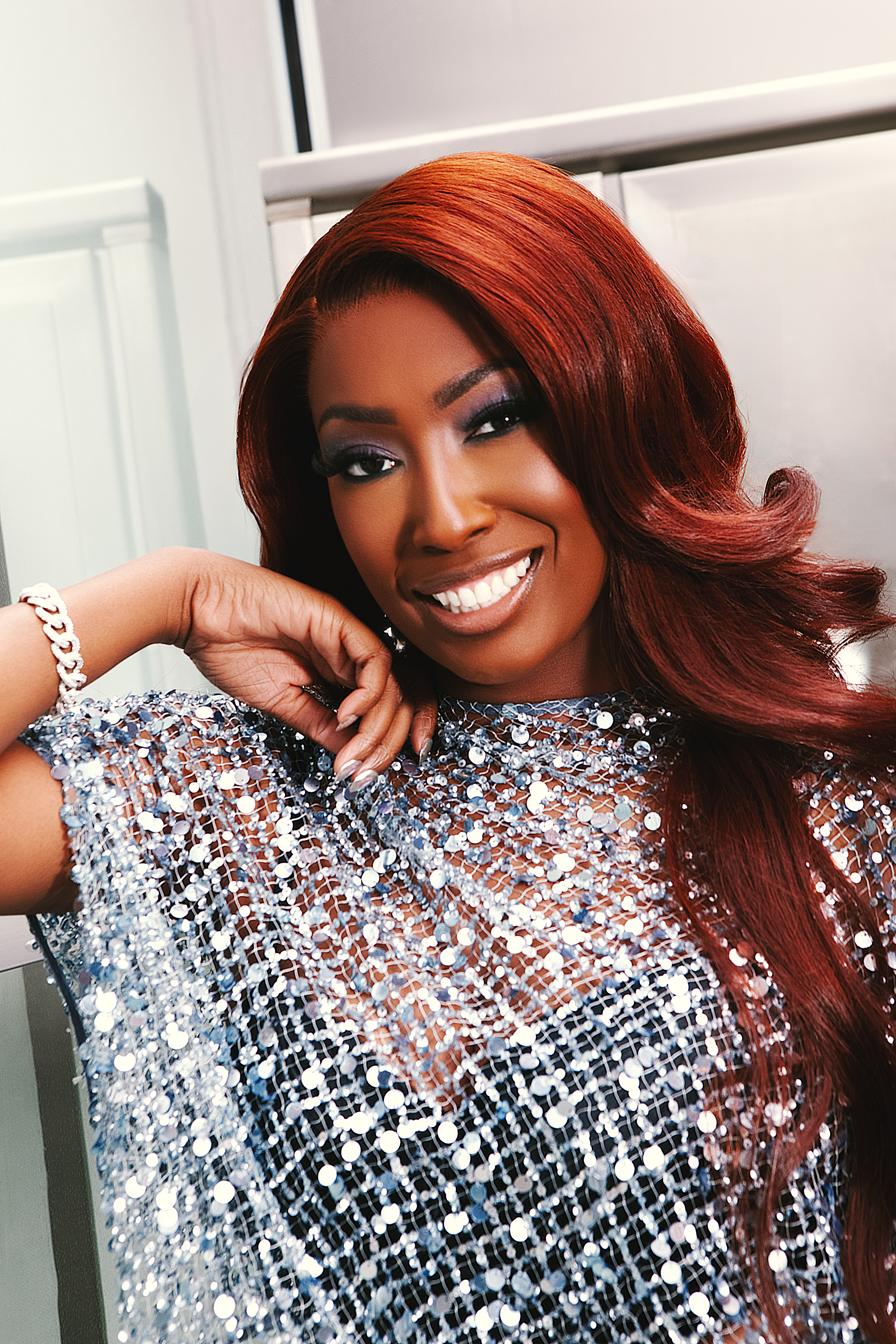
- Aisha Bowe in 2025
- Born: November 4, 1985 (age 41); Ann Arbor, Michigan
- Education: University of Michigan
- Organization: STEMBoard
- Known for: Aerospace engineering, entrepreneurship, and STEM education
- Website: www.aishabowe.com

Aisha Bowe (born November 4, 1985) is a Bahamian American aerospace engineer, entrepreneur, and STEM advocate. She is the co-founder and chief executive officer of STEMBoard, a technology and professional services company, and the founder of LINGO, an education technology company. STEMBoard was named to Inc. magazine's Inc. 5000 list of the fastest-growing private companies in the United States in 2020 and 2023.

In April 2025, Bowe flew aboard the Blue Origin NS-31 suborbital mission, where she served as a science payload operator for plant biology experiments conducted in partnership with NASA-affiliated research institutions.

== Early life and education ==
Bowe grew up in the United States in a working-class family. Her high school guidance counselor advised her to pursue cosmetology, after which she enrolled at Washtenaw Community College. While there, her father encouraged her to take a mathematics course, which helped her build the academic foundation needed to transfer into engineering programs at the University of Michigan. During this period, her father was also pursuing a degree in electrical engineering, an experience Bowe has cited as influential in her academic development.

Bowe earned a bachelor's degree in aerospace engineering in 2008 and a master's degree in space systems engineering in 2009, both from the University of Michigan. During graduate study, she was mentored by professor Thomas Zurbuchen, who encouraged her to pursue a career at NASA.

== Career ==
Bowe worked at the Ames Research Center in the Flight Trajectory Dynamics and Controls Branch of the Aviation Systems Division. She later joined the AST Flight and Fluid Mechanics group in 2009, contributing to the development of algorithms supporting air traffic management. In 2012, she received the National Society of Black Engineers award for Outstanding Technical Contribution for her paper "Evaluation of a Fuel Efficient Aircraft Maneuver for Conflict Resolution".

While at NASA, Bowe served as liaison to the Mathematics, Engineering, Science Achievement (MESA) Program, mentoring students, leading workshops, and conducting NASA site tours.

=== STEMBoard ===
Bowe is founder and CEO of STEMBoard. The company provides professional advisory services to organizations in the U.S Government

STEMBoard was named to Inc. Magazine's Inc. 5000 list of the fastest-growing private companies in the United States in 2020 and 2023. The company was also the recipient of the Nunn-Perry Award 2022 presented by the United States Department of Defense.

=== LINGO ===
In 2022, Bowe founded LINGO, an education technology company that develops hands-on, project-based STEM learning kits and curriculum. In 2024, the company raised $2.3 million. LINGO was recognized by Inc. magazine in 2022 when Bowe was named to its Female Founders list, and the company's coding kits have been featured in WIRED, which included LINGO in its guide to the best subscription boxes for kids.

=== Public engagement and outreach ===
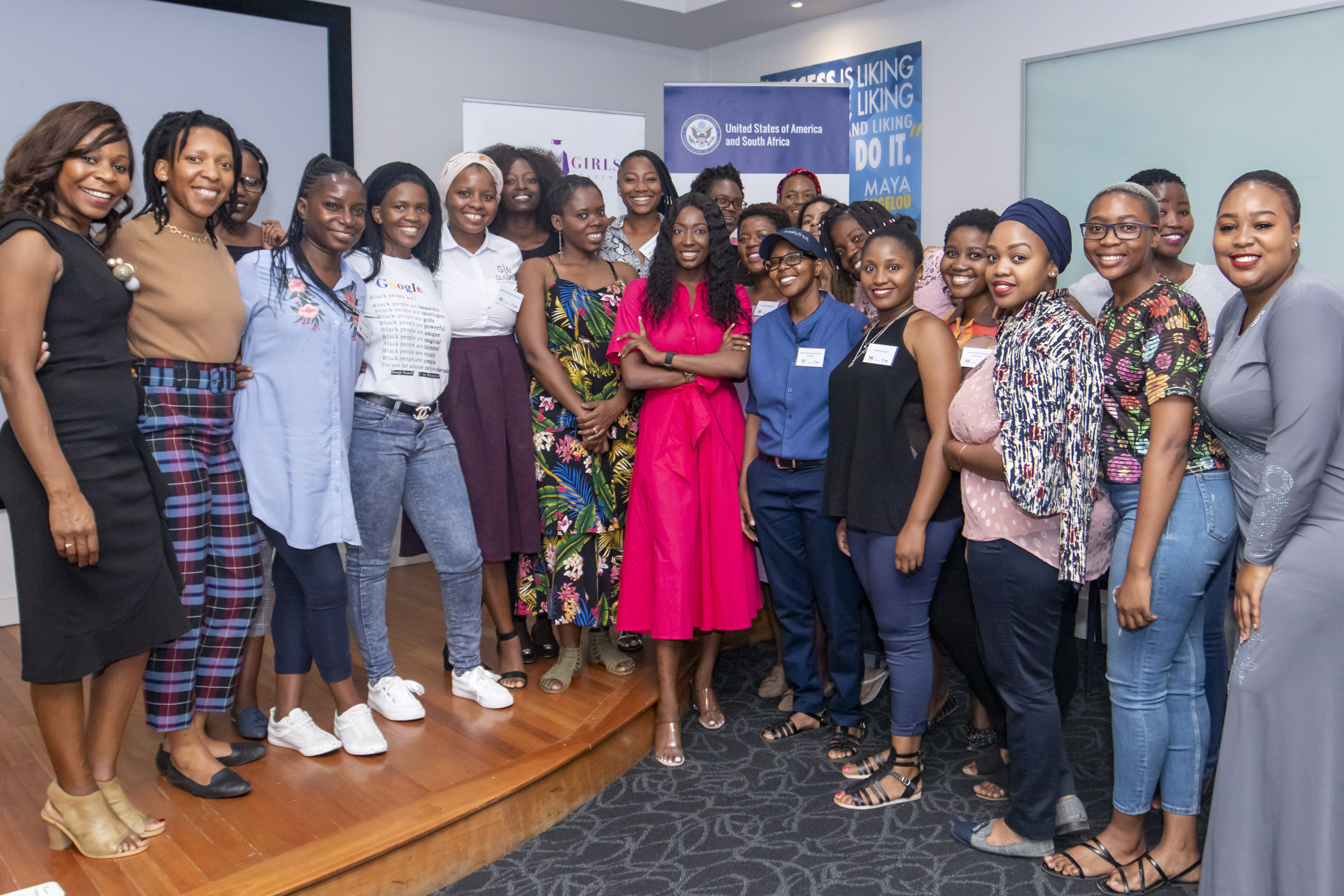
Bowe (center) gives motivational talk for the US Embassy in South Africa in 2019.

In February 2025, Bowe was invited by the Bahamas Ministry of Tourism to attend a SpaceX Falcon 9 booster landing in the Exumas, in recognition of her work supporting spaceflight coordination and STEM initiatives in The Bahamas.

Bowe has also participated in international public diplomacy and STEM outreach initiatives. She is a speaker in the U.S. Department of State Speaker Program, delivering lectures on STEM education, entrepreneurship and space in numerous countries including South Africa, Mongolia, Kyrgyzstan, India, and Egypt .

=== Blue Origin NS-31 Mission ===
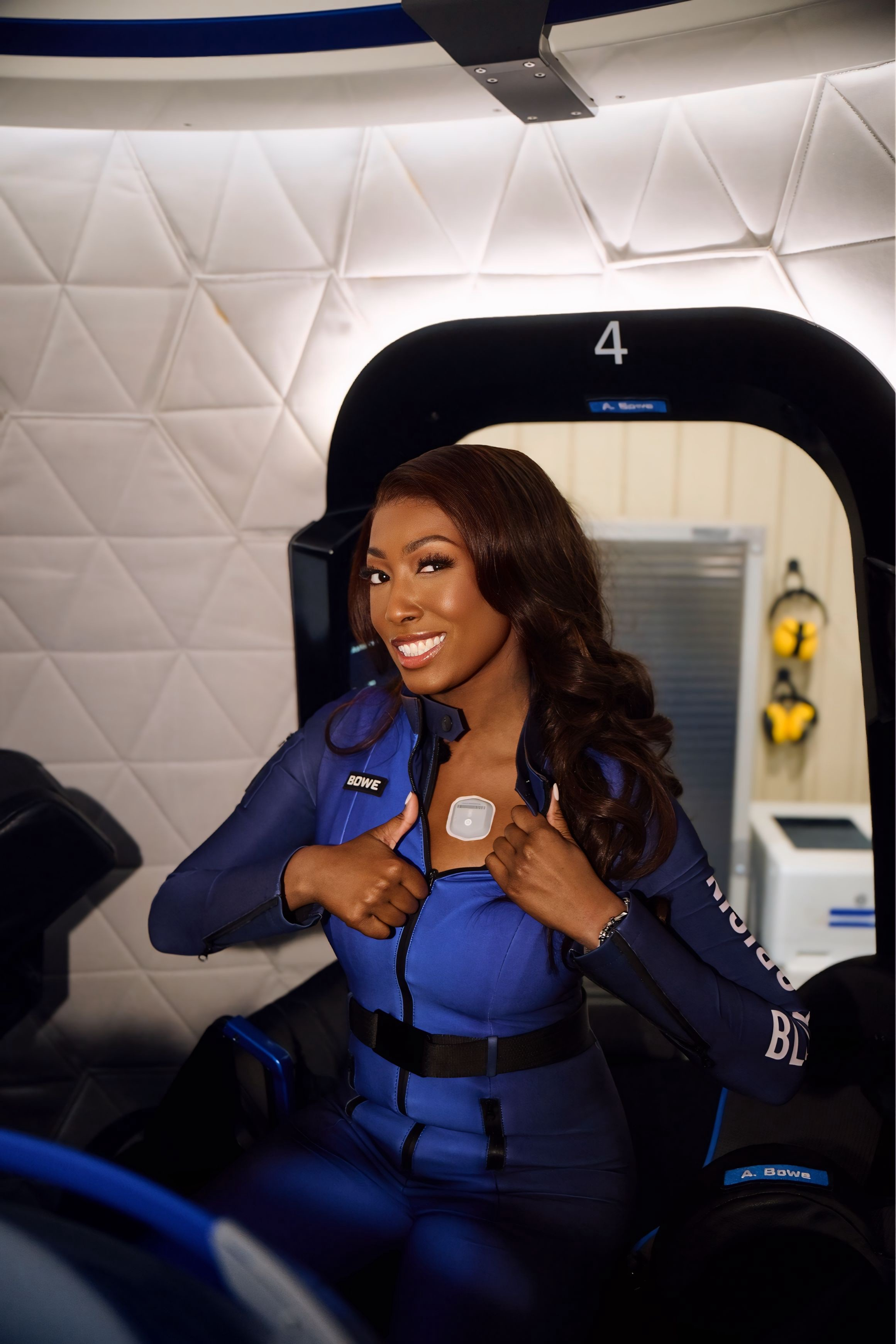
Aisha Bowe with the BioServe biometric device in NS-31 flight training

Bowe traveled with Blue Origin in 2025 on the Blue Origin NS-31 mission. On the flight, she served as the science payload operator for a collaborative experiment with NASA's Translational Research Institute for Space Health (TRISH) and BioServe Space Technologies at the University of Colorado, Boulder, which flew sweet potato, tomato, chickpea, and Arabidopsis seedlings. The mission's goal was to genetically sequence the plants after exposure to microgravity and compare them to ground controls to better understand how crops adapt to space at the molecular level. The study examined how microgravity and radiation affect plant biology to advance future space farming and food security efforts.

During the New Shepard mission, Bowe operated two scientific payloads: one supported by NASA's Translational Research Institute for Space Health (TRISH), and another developed in partnership with BioServe Space Technologies, Winston-Salem State University, and the Brazilian Space Agency.

She became the sixth Black woman to cross the Kármán line, the internationally recognized boundary of space. she shared the mission with guests Lauren Sánchez Bezos Gayle King, Katy Perry, Amanda Nguyen, and Kerianne Flynn on 14 April 2025.

Bowe traveled with Blue Origin on NS-31, making her the first Black woman confirmed to travel with the company.

In addition to contributing to science, Bowe carried symbolic items on the mission, including the personal American flag of Apollo 12 commander Pete Conrad, flown with permission from the Conrad family and the Museum of Flight, as well as a University of Michigan flag.

In a 2024 interview with ABC News, Bowe shared that she mentored a 13-year-old girl who is now an aerospace engineer working for Blue Origin on one of the same rocket systems on which Bowe flew.

== Awards ==
Bowe has received recognition for her contributions to aerospace engineering, entrepreneurship, and STEM education.

- NASA Equal Employment Opportunity Medal (2012)
- NASA Engineering Honor Award (2012)
- U.S. Women's Chamber of Commerce Emerging Star Award (2015)
- Inc. Female Founders honoree (2022)
- Washington Business Journal 40 Under 40 (2023)
- Virginia Business Magazine Black Business Leaders Award (2023)
- STEM for Her's Woman of the Year (2024)
- Black Enterprise Women of Power Luminary Award (2024)
- Essence Magazine POWER 40 (2024)

== Publications ==
Selected publications by Bowe include:

- Bowe, Aisha; Lauderdale, Todd (2010). "Selecting conflict resolution maneuvers based on minimum fuel burn". 29th Digital Avionics Systems Conference. IEEE. doi:10.1109/DASC.2010.5655529. ISBN 978-1-4244-6616-0. S2CID 16101938.
- Lauderdale, Todd A; Cone, Andrew C; Bowe, Aisha R (2011). "Relative significance of trajectory prediction errors on an automated separation assurance algorithm" (PDF). 9th USA/Europe ATM R&D Seminar (ATM2011). Archived from the original (PDF) on February 26, 2013.
- Bowe, Aisha; Santiago, Confesor (2012). "An approach for balancing delay and fuel burn in separation assurance automation" (PDF). 12th AIAA Aviation Technology, Integration, and Operations (ATIO) Conference and 14th AIAA/ISSMO Multidisciplinary Analysis and Optimization Conference. doi:10.2514/6.2012-5416. ISBN 978-1-60086-930-3. Archived from the original (PDF) on September 15, 2015.
- Cone, Andrew; Bowe, Aisha; Lauderdale, Todd (2012). "Robust conflict detection and resolution around top of descent" (PDF). 12th AIAA Aviation Technology, Integration, and Operations (ATIO) Conference and 14th AIAA/ISSMO Multidisciplinary Analysis and Optimization Conference. doi:10.2514/6.2012-5644. ISBN 978-1-60086-930-3. Archived from the original (PDF) on August 8, 2017.
