= Laura Kim =

Korean-American fashion designer

- Education: Pratt Institute
- Label: Monse
- Awards: Swarovski Award for Emerging Talent (2017)

Laura Kim is a Korean-American fashion designer. She is the co-founder and co-creative director of the New York-based luxury label Monse, and from 2016 to 2026 was co-creative director of Oscar de la Renta with Fernando Garcia. Born in Seoul, South Korea, and raised in Calgary, Canada, she worked at Oscar de la Renta for twelve years before founding Monse with Garcia in 2015. She is a founding member of the House of Slay.

== Early life and education ==
Kim was born in Seoul, South Korea, and raised in Calgary, Canada. Her parents, both former textile manufacturers, trained her in the tools of the trade from a young age, and she has said she was draping and sewing by age three. She moved to New York to study fashion design at the Pratt Institute in Brooklyn, graduating with a Bachelor of Fine Arts degree. While studying, she interned at Jeremy Scott and TSE Cashmere, and in 2003 she began an internship at Oscar de la Renta.

== Career ==
=== Early career at Oscar de la Renta ===
Kim worked at Oscar de la Renta from 2003 to 2015, rising from intern to design director under founder Oscar de la Renta. After de la Renta's death in 2014, the house named British designer Peter Copping creative director, passing over Kim and her colleague Fernando Garcia, and the pair left to start their own label.

=== Monse ===
Kim and Garcia founded the New York-based luxury label Monse in 2015 and showed their first collection that September at the Norwood Club during New York Fashion Week; the debut took the shirt as its main source of inspiration. The label became known for deconstructed tailoring that mixed masculine and feminine elements. In 2017, Kim and Garcia won the Swarovski Award for Emerging Talent at the CFDA Fashion Awards for their work at Monse. In 2025, Monse co-designed with Lauren Sánchez the custom flight suits worn by the all-female crew of the Blue Origin NS-31 spaceflight. The label marked its tenth anniversary in 2025.

=== Return to Oscar de la Renta ===
After leaving Oscar de la Renta, Kim consulted for Carolina Herrera in late 2015 and became senior vice president for design there in January 2016, but she left after about ten months. Oscar de la Renta named Kim and Garcia co-creative directors in September 2016, succeeding Copping. Carolina Herrera Ltd. sued Kim and Oscar de la Renta over the non-compete clause in her contract; a judge lifted a preliminary injunction that had barred Kim from working at Oscar de la Renta, and the dispute was later settled. Kim and Garcia made their Oscar de la Renta runway debut in February 2017, presenting the Monse and Oscar de la Renta fall 2017 collections back-to-back in a single show. Reviewing the debut in The Cut, Cathy Horyn wrote that the designers succeeded in "giving Oscar a more youthful imprint without losing the brand's uptown identity". In September 2025, Kim and Garcia announced they would step down from Oscar de la Renta to focus on Monse; their final collection for the house was shown in February 2026, and they remained shareholders and joined the company's board of directors. In total, Kim worked at Oscar de la Renta for more than two decades across her two spells at the house.

== Other work ==
In 2024, Kim launched a home collection with Crate & Barrel, a 110-piece line of tableware, kitchenware, and furniture. She is a founding member of the House of Slay, a group formed during the COVID-19 pandemic with fashion figures Prabal Gurung, Phillip Lim, Tina Leung, and Ezra J. William that campaigns against anti-Asian hate; in November 2021 the group launched a digital comic book starring the five members.

== See also ==
- Koreans in New York City
