= Empatica =

Health industry trade group

Empatica Inc.
- Type: Private
- Industry: Healthcare
- Founder: Matteo Lai, Rosalind Picard, Simone Tognetti, Maurizio Garbarino
- Headquarters: Boston, Massachusetts
- Products: Empatica Health Monitoring platform, EmbracePlus, EmbraceMini, EpiMonitor, Empatica Care, Embrace2, E4 Wristband, Research Portal, Alert App, Mate App, Aria
- Services: Clinical Trial Platforms Development, Respiratory Infections Detection, Seizure Monitoring, Biomarkers Development, Parkinson’s Monitoring Platform, Remote Patient Monitoring
- Website: https://www.empatica.com

Empatica Inc. is an MIT Media Lab spinoff company born in Cambridge, Massachusetts, operating in Healthcare, providing AI-enabled tools to advance forecasting, monitoring, research, and treatment. Empatica’s wearable devices include EmbracePlus and EmbraceMini, as well as earlier devices such as Embrace2 and E4. These wearables measure and track physiological signals such as heart rate, heart rate variability, electrodermal activity, motion and acceleration, skin temperature, and other indicators of autonomic nervous system activity. These data support applications in health monitoring, digital biomarker development, sleep and activity tracking, and clinical research. Empatica developed the Empatica Health Monitoring Platform, a digital health platform that integrates wearable data, cloud-based infrastructure, and digital biomarkers for continuous physiological monitoring and analysis. The platform supports remote patient monitoring, decentralized clinical trials, and clinical research across multiple therapeutic areas, including neurology, sleep, mental health, and movement disorders. The company is headquartered in Boston, MA with offices in Milan, Italy, and Seoul, South Korea.

== History ==
Empatica Inc. was founded in 2013 in Cambridge, Massachusetts, by Matteo Lai, Simone Tognetti, and Rosalind Picard. Picard serves as part-time chief scientist and chairman of the board, while Lai is full-time CEO, Tognetti is CTO.

In 2014, in partnership with The Epilepsy Foundation, Empatica launched a crowdfunding campaign on Indiegogo for the creation of a wrist-worn device for monitoring and alerting to grand mal seizures, and help reduce cases of Sudden Unexpected Death in Epilepsy (SUDEP). This device was called Embrace.

In January 2018 Embrace (both the hardware and its Alert software) received FDA-clearance for adults and became the first medical wristwatch to be cleared by FDA for use in Epilepsy. In November 2018 an updated version of the Embrace, called Embrace2, was released.

In January 2019, Embrace2 received FDA-clearance for children ages 6 and up.

In November 2019, Empatica introduced EmbracePlus, a medical-grade smartwatch designed for physiological monitoring in clinical research. The device integrates sensors for photoplethysmography (PPG), electrodermal activity, motion, and temperature, and provides both processed digital biomarkers and access to raw physiological data for research studies. EmbracePlus was introduced as a next-generation research wearable building on the E4 wristband. It has also been used in space health research programs supported by the Translational Research Institute for Space Health (TRISH), which partners with NASA’s Human Research Program.

In November 2022, the Empatica Health Monitoring Platform received FDA-clearance for continuous data collection to monitor SpO2, electrodermal activity, skin temperature, and activity associated with movement during sleep.

In November 2023, the Empatica Health Monitoring Platform received additional FDA 510(k) clearance for digital biomarkers measuring pulse and respiratory rate, expanding the set of FDA-cleared physiological measures supported by the platform for clinical research and healthcare monitoring.

In February 2024, Empatica introduced EpiMonitor, an FDA-cleared epilepsy monitoring system designed to detect generalized tonic-clonic seizures in adults and children aged 6 and older. The system, powered by the EmbracePlus smartwatch and a companion mobile application, succeeded the Embrace2 device and provides automated seizure detection and alerts for caregivers.

In September 2024, Empatica introduced a Cloud API for the Empatica Health Monitoring Platform, enabling integration of wearable data from devices such as EmbracePlus with external clinical research systems. The API allows pharmaceutical companies, CROs, and clinical trial sponsors to integrate physiological data and digital biomarkers into clinical trial management systems (CTMS) and electronic data capture (EDC) platforms.

In December 2024, the Empatica Health Monitoring Platform received CE mark certification under the European Union’s Medical Device Regulation (MDR 2017/745), enabling its use in the European Economic Area for medical and clinical research applications. The certification followed the platform’s earlier FDA clearance in the United States.

In June 2025, the FDA authorized a Predetermined Change Control Plan (PCCP) for Empatica’s pulse oximetry (SpO₂) algorithm used in the Empatica Health Monitoring Platform. The authorization allows updates to the algorithm without requiring a new 510(k) submission, supporting the use of pulse oximetry measurements collected through the EmbracePlus wearable in clinical research and remote monitoring.

In June 2025, Empatica introduced EmbraceMini, an actigraphy wearable designed for use in clinical trials and healthcare research. The device collects continuous activity and sleep data using motion and environmental sensors and integrates with the Empatica Health Monitoring Platform for the analysis of physiological signals and digital biomarkers.

In October 2025, Empatica acquired PKG Health, a company specializing in movement disorder algorithms and digital endpoints for Parkinson’s disease. The acquisition expanded Empatica’s capabilities in neurological monitoring and digital biomarker development for clinical research and patient care.

In December 2025, the Empatica Health Monitoring Platform introduced support for electronic clinical outcome assessments (eCOA), including electronic patient-reported outcomes (ePRO), functional performance tests, and medication adherence reminders. The integration allows clinical trial sponsors and researchers to combine patient-reported data with physiological signals collected from wearable devices such as EmbracePlus and EmbraceMini.

In January 2026, EmbraceMini received an FDA 510(k) clearance for use in sleep monitoring and actigraphy-based assessment of sleep and physical activity. The clearance enabled the device to be used for remote monitoring of sleep patterns and circadian rhythm activity in clinical research and healthcare settings.

In January 2026, the Empatica Health Monitoring Platform received CE mark certification under the European Union Medical Device Regulation (EU MDR 2017/745) for Parkinson’s disease monitoring using PKG movement disorder algorithms. The certification enabled the platform and the EmbraceMini wearable to be used in Europe and the United Kingdom for continuous monitoring of motor symptoms associated with Parkinson’s disease.

The company was named one of the World's Top HealthTech Companies in 2026 by Time magazine.

== Products ==
=== Empatica Health Monitoring Platform ===
The Empatica Health Monitoring Platform is a digital health platform for continuous physiological monitoring and data analysis. It integrates data collected from wearable devices, including EmbracePlus and EmbraceMini, with cloud-based infrastructure for the storage, processing, and analysis of physiological signals. The platform enables researchers, healthcare organizations, and clinical trial sponsors to collect and analyze wearable data related to physiological activity, including electrodermal activity, heart rate-related signals, movement, and skin temperature. These data streams support digital biomarker development, remote patient monitoring, and clinical trials, including decentralized and hybrid studies. The platform also provides tools for managing wearable deployments, accessing raw physiological data, and generating derived metrics to support clinical research, digital health studies, and data-driven healthcare applications.

=== EmbracePlus ===
In November 2019, Empatica announced EmbracePlus, a research smart watch which is built in partnership with the Translational Research Institute for Space Health (TRISH), under NASA’s Human Research Program (HRP) which develops innovative approaches to reduce risks to humans on deep space missions, including NASA’s Journey to Mars.

EmbracePlus is able to continuously and remotely collect and process key physiological signals from the wrist, including pulse rate, pulse rate variability, blood oxygenation, respiratory rate, skin temperature, electrodermal activity, rest, and actigraphy data.

Following a response to the Request for Project Proposals issued in May 2020, Empatica has received funding from the U.S. Army Medical Research and Development Command to deploy EmbracePlus (and the Aria algorithm) to enable the early and pre-symptomatic detection of COVID-19. The device will monitor a person’s vital signs, and check for patterns that suggest the presence of a COVID-19 infection. This can be used to help wearers self-isolate and seek testing without unwittingly infecting others.

In April 2021, EmbracePlus has received the European CE mark as a Class lla medical device. EmbracePlus later became the primary device used with the Empatica Health Monitoring Platform, which received FDA clearance in 2022 and additional regulatory authorizations for physiological monitoring and digital biomarkers in 2023 and later years.

=== EmbraceMini ===
In June 2025, Empatica introduced EmbraceMini, an actigraphy wearable designed for continuous monitoring of sleep and physical activity in clinical research and healthcare applications. In January 2026, the device received U.S. Food and Drug Administration (FDA) 510(k) clearance for sleep monitoring and actigraphy-based assessment of sleep patterns and circadian rhythms.

=== EpiMonitor ===
EpiMonitor is an FDA-cleared epilepsy monitoring system for seizure detection and epilepsy management. The system builds on technology originally developed for the Embrace2 wearable and is powered by the EmbracePlus smartwatch. It combines wearable technology, physiological sensors, cloud-based data processing, and machine learning algorithms to support continuous epilepsy monitoring and seizure detection. EpiMonitor collects continuous physiological data from the wearable device, including electrodermal activity, heart rate-related signals, motion and acceleration, and skin temperature. These signals are analyzed to identify patterns associated with generalized tonic-clonic seizures and other physiological changes. The system includes automated seizure alerts, user-triggered alerts, and a digital seizure diary designed to support people living with epilepsy and their caregivers in tracking and managing seizure activity.

=== Empatica Care ===
Empatica Care is an AI-powered platform that enables the continuous, remote monitoring of patients. The subject's physiological data are collected by the EmbracePlus smartwatch and communicated to the Care App via Bluetooth. The data transferred to the cloud by the wearable device is automatically gathered inside the Care Portal, an online tool where professionals can visualize in real-time vitals of individuals who may be at work, at home, or in a different ward inside the hospital.

In March 2021, Care has received the European CE mark for early detection of COVID-19.

=== Parkinson’s Monitoring ===
In January 2026, the Empatica Health Monitoring Platform received CE mark certification under EU MDR 2017/745 for Parkinson’s disease monitoring using PKG movement disorder algorithms. The system combines validated PKG digital measures with wearable data collected through devices such as EmbraceMini to enable continuous monitoring of motor symptoms associated with Parkinson’s disease.

=== Embrace ===
Embrace is a smartwatch designed to detect generalized tonic-clonic seizures and alert caregivers in real-time via a companion app Alert. The idea for Embrace was born following a discovery developing sensors to monitor stress. Chief Scientist and co-founder Rosalind Picard and her colleagues at the MIT Media lab were initially working on a wristband to help children on the autism spectrum better communicate their emotional states. One of Picard's undergraduate students borrowed a couple of devices to bring home over the winter break and test them on his autistic brother. A spike in activity registered by one of the devices during this time, attributed to a grand mal seizure event, tipped Picard off to the technology's potential for seizure detection.

Embrace is also used by researchers, pharmaceutical businesses, and other healthcare investigators to collect medical quality data for research. In 2017, Sunovion used Embrace in a phase 4 clinical study of Aptiom, a drug meant to reduce seizures in people with epilepsy. In 2018, results were published showing that data collected by Embrace was useful in examining the nausea felt by passengers undergoing zero-gravity flight.

=== Alert App ===
Alert is a mobile app and subscription service that works with Embrace2 to send out an emergency call and text message to listed caregivers, including their exact GPS location.

=== Mate App ===
Mate is a mobile app that displays physiological data collected by the Embrace2. It displays sleep time, efficiency, fragmentation, and tosses and turns, as well as levels of physical activity and step count. It can also be used as a digital seizure diary.

=== Research Portal ===
The Research Portal is a cloud-based software that enables researchers to virtually view and process the raw data collected by Embrace during their studies.

=== E4 Wristband ===
The E4 collects real-time physiological data, which can be used to conduct in-depth analysis and visualization. The device is equipped with a PPG sensor, EDA sensor, 3-axis accelerometer, and Infrared Thermopile. The E4 is used by researchers to measure arousal in individuals within laboratory and/or naturalistic settings to study, for example, stress or other emotions. Studies conducted using the E4 range from testing wearables for predicting substance addiction relapses, to measuring the engagement of students in a classroom, to researching predictions in aggressive meltdowns in autism.

=== Aria ===
Aria was developed in response to COVID-19 and in partnership with the U.S. Department of Health and Human Services’ BARDA. It is a wearable AI system with an app and online dashboard, that can help contain an infectious transmission by automatically alerting individuals to the earliest physiological signs of a possible infection, even without any symptoms being present.

In November 2020 Empatica has received funding from the U.S. Army Medical Research and Development Command to deploy Aria (and the EmbracePlus smartwatch) to enable the early and pre-symptomatic detection of COVID-19.

In March 2021, Aria has received the European CE mark for early detection of COVID-19.

== Collaborations ==
The NASA-funded Translational Research Institute for Space Health (TRISH) is working with Empatica to develop a smartwatch able to monitor the health of the astronauts that will be on board the first crewed mission to Mars.

Since 2018, Empatica has been working in partnership with the U.S. Government's BARDA Division of Research, Innovation and Ventures (DRIVe), under the Department of Health and Human Services (HHS), to collaborate on the development of a new smartwatch which will alert users when they are developing a serious respiratory infection before any symptoms appear.

In response to the COVID-19 pandemic, Empatica is collaborating with the U.S. Army Medical Research and Development Command (USAMRDC) to deploy a wearable and algorithm that enables the early and pre-symptomatic detection of COVID-19.

Prescription digital therapeutics company Pear Therapeutics is collaborating with Empatica to use its wearable sensors to evaluate withdrawal symptoms in patients with substance use disorder (SUD), opioid use disorder (OUD), and alcohol use disorder (AUD).

Empatica technology has also been used in research collaborations and observational studies with academic, clinical, and industry partners. In the INSPIRE 22 expedition, participants wore EmbracePlus devices during a medical research mission in Antarctica to study human metabolism and physiological adaptation in extreme environments.

Boston University School of Medicine and Bristol Myers Squibb used EmbracePlus in a home-based study of sleep quality and cognitive performance in people with Alzheimer’s disease and healthy adults.

Empatica also collaborated with Takeda on research into digital biomarkers for Fabry disease, using electrodermal activity data collected through EmbracePlus to study altered sweating patterns.

Chugai Pharmaceutical used Empatica wearables in a study of patients with endometriosis to explore digital biomarkers for pain assessment.

Biogen collaborated with Empatica in a decentralized natural history study of pediatric participants with KCNT1-related epilepsy, using EmbracePlus and custom seizure detection algorithms to characterize seizure activity.

In mental health research, Harvard University researchers used Embrace2 in a multi-site study on digital phenotypes associated with suicidal thoughts. At the University of California, San Francisco (UCSF), EmbracePlus was used in psychedelic research examining physiological responses during psilocybin dosing sessions and the role of contextual factors in treatment outcomes.

Empatica wearables have also been used in studies of fatigue, sleep, and physiology in challenging operational environments. Texas A&M University used EmbracePlus in a Department of Defense-supported study investigating breath biomarkers and physiological indicators of fatigue.

The device was also selected for the INSIGHT study, led by The Geneva Foundation and multiple military and academic partners, to investigate sleep disorders, sympathetic nervous system activity, and traumatic brain injury in service members and veterans.

In the APEX 7 HiCORT study, EmbracePlus was used in high-altitude endocrinology research in Bolivia to monitor sleep, autonomic activity, temperature, and physical activity during exposure to hypoxia.

The PEXRT study uses the EmbracePlus wearable to objectively measure stress in breast cancer radiotherapy patients. Early results show reliable data collection and strong usability in clinical settings.
