= National Space Biomedical Research Institute =

NASA funded research organization

- Founded: 1997
- Dissolved: 2017
- Location: Houston, Texas
- Website: www.nsbri.org

The National Space Biomedical Research Institute (NSBRI) was a NASA-funded consortium of institutions studying the health risks related to long-duration spaceflight and developing solutions to reduce those risks. The NSBRI was founded in 1997 through a NASA Cooperative Agreement. The founding director was Laurence R. Young of MIT. The original headquarters office was in the Neurosensory Center Building in the Texas Medical Center in Houston. NSBRI later moved to its 16,400-square-foot headquarters facility located in the BioScience Research Collaborative in Houston, Texas. The Institute shared the facility with Baylor College of Medicine's Center for Space Medicine. The official opening was held March 19, 2012.

In March 2012 NASA announced a five-year extension of its cooperative agreement with NSBRI. At the end of this period NASA wound down its relationship with NSBRI, which closed in 2017. The consortium was succeeded by the Translational Research Institute for Space Health (TRISH), led by the Baylor College of Medicine.

== Research programs ==
NSBRI coordinated its research with NASA's Human Research Program and contributed to its goal of reducing spaceflight risks. In 2016 NASA described the role of the collaboration as "investigat[ing] challenges of long-duration human spaceflight and bridg[ing] the expertise of biomedical community with the scientific, engineering, and operational expertise of NASA."

In 2010 and 2011, NSBRI was the only U.S. organization to participate in the Mars-500 Project's 520-day mission simulations with an experiment that monitored the six crew members' rest-activity cycles, performance and psychological responses to determine the extent to which sleep loss, fatigue, stress, mood changes and conflicts occurred during the mission.

=== Research Teams ===
- Cardiovascular Alterations
- Human Factors and Performance
- Musculoskeletal Alterations
- Neurobehavioral and Psychosocial Factors
- Radiation Effects
- Sensorimotor Adaptation
- Smart Medical Systems and Technology

=== Outreach ===
NSBRI ran an education and outreach program. In 2007, its Education and Outreach team won a Stellar Award from the Rotary National Award for Space Achievement Foundation for "performance as a nationally recognized, top-tier program that is pioneering new models for exemplary teaching, training and public outreach in support of the Vision for Space Exploration."

== Consortium members ==
- Baylor College of Medicine
- Brookhaven National Laboratory
- Harvard Medical School
- Johns Hopkins University
- Massachusetts Institute of Technology
- Morehouse School of Medicine
- Mount Sinai School of Medicine
- Rice University
- Texas A&M University
- University of Arkansas for Medical Sciences
- University of Pennsylvania Health System
- University of Washington
