= Sexual Assault Survivors' Rights Act =

Civil rights legislation in the US

Survivors' Bill of Rights Act of 2016
- Long title: An Act to establish certain rights for sexual assault survivors, and for other purposes.
- Enacted by: the 114th United States Congress
- Effective: October 7, 2016

Citations
- Public law: Pub. L. 114–236 (text) (PDF)
- Statutes at Large: 130 Stat. 966

Codification
- U.S.C. sections created: 18 U.S.C. § 3772
- U.S.C. sections amended: 42 U.S.C. § 10601, 42 U.S.C. § 10603

Legislative history
- Introduced in the House as the Survivors' Bill of Rights Act of 2016 (H.R. 5578) by Mimi Walters (R–CA) on June 24, 2016; Committee consideration by House Judiciary, House Energy and Commerce, Senate Judiciary; Passed the House on September 6, 2016 (399-0); Passed the Senate on September 28, 2016 (voice vote); Signed into law by President Barack Obama on October 7, 2016

The Survivors' Bill of Rights Act of 2016 (Pub. L. 114–236 (text) (PDF)) is a landmark civil rights and victims rights legislation in the United States that establishes, for the first time, statutory rights in federal code for survivors of sexual assault and rape. This legislation was passed by the United States Congress in September 2016 and signed into law by US President Barack Obama on October 7, 2016.

The law overhauls the way that rape kits are processed within the United States and creates a bill of rights for victims. Through the law, survivors of sexual assault are given the right to have a rape kit preserved for the length of the case's statute of limitations, to be notified of an evidence kit's destruction, and to be informed about results of forensic exams. The main aim is to overhaul how assaults are reported, and lessen the burden on those who were assaulted, who are often discouraged by the amount of hurdles that they have to go through.

== Historic milestones ==
=== Unanimous bill passage ===
The Survivors' Bill of Rights Act of 2016 passed unanimously in the House and Senate. The bill unanimously passed both chambers of Congress on a roll call vote, a feat only 0.016 percent of substantive bills have done since 1989. The bill took 7 months to pass. It will be the first time the term sexual assault survivor appears in federal code. The effort has been supported by law enforcement.

=== State movement ===
The intent of the federal bill was to serve as a model for states to follow. Inspired by the model, states have begun to pass or introduce the bill. Massachusetts, Oregon, and Virginia are among the states that have passed versions of these civil rights. In Minnesota and California, legislators, advocacy groups and law enforcement are planning on introducing it.

== Legislative history ==
=== Bill introduction ===
S.2613 – Adam Walsh Reauthorization Act of 2016 was introduced by Senator Chuck Grassley (R-IA) on March 1, 2016. The Sections 5, 6, and 7 of this bill stipulated statutory rights for sexual assault survivors. The bill was referred to the Senate Committee on the Judiciary, where it was ordered to be reported to the Senate floor on April 14, 2016.

=== Passage in the Senate ===
The Senate passed the bill unanimously on May 23, 2016. The Yea-Nay vote count was 89 - 0. The bill was referred to the House Committee on the Judiciary on May 24, 2016.

=== Passage in the House ===
H.R.5578 – Survivors' Bill of Rights Act of 2016 was introduced by Mimi Walters (R-CA-45) and Zoe Lofgren (D-CA-19) on June 24, 2016. Unlike S. 2613, this bill solely focused upon the statutory rights for sexual assault survivors. The bill was ordered to be reported to the House floor on July 7, 2016. The House passed the bill unanimously on September 6, 2016. The Yea-Nay vote count was 399 - 0. Speaker Paul Ryan held a press conference and discussed the bipartisan vote. The bill was then sent to the Senate Committee on the Judiciary. The Senate then passed H.R. 5578 on September 28, 2016

=== Bill signing ===
The Survivors' Bill of Rights Act of 2016 was signed into law by President Barack Obama on October 7, 2016, which is now Public Law No: 114-236. The signing of the historic law trended on social media and became a Twitter Moment.

== Major features ==
=== Section 1 ===
"It establishes statutory rights for sexual assault survivors, including the right to: (1) receive a forensic medical examination at no cost; (2) have a sexual assault evidence collection kit (i.e., a rape kit) preserved for 20 years or the maximum applicable statute of limitations, whichever is shorter; (3) receive written notification prior to destruction or disposal of a rape kit; and (4) be informed of the rights and policies under this section.

Additionally, it makes statutory crime victims' rights applicable to sexual assault survivors. The term "sexual assault" means any nonconsensual sexual act prohibited by federal, state, or tribal law, including when a victim lacks capacity to consent. Funds made available to the Crime Victims Fund under the Victims of Crime Act of 1984 must be used to carry out the requirements of this section, subject to specified exceptions."

=== Section 2 ===
"The bill amends the Victims of Crime Act of 1984 to authorize DOJ's Office of Justice Programs to make grants to states to develop sexual assault survivors' rights and policies and to disseminate written notice of such rights and policies to medical centers, hospitals, forensic examiners, sexual assault service providers, law enforcement agencies, and other state entities."

=== Section 3 ===
"DOJ must establish a working group to develop, coordinate, and disseminate best practices regarding the care and treatment of sexual assault survivors and the preservation of forensic evidence. The working group must report its findings and recommended actions."

== Influence ==
A bill for sexual assault survivors' rights was created by Amanda Nguyen and her nonprofit organization Rise, after her experience as a survivor navigating the criminal justice system in Massachusetts. The introduction of the Senate bill S.2613 was paired with a Funny or Die video and a Change.org petition to raise awareness about the issue using an unconventional method. The video went viral and helped usher 100,000 signatures to the petition within days. Actress Erin Richards starred in the video. Other influencers have been outspoken about their support, including actress Patricia Arquette, author Junot Díaz, actor George Takei, actress Gina Rodriguez, and actress Tatiana Maslany. On June 26, 2018, Nguyen and actor Terry Crews testified before the U.S. Senate Judiciary Committee on the implementation and next steps of the Act.

== See also ==
- Effects and aftermath of rape
- Post-assault treatment of sexual assault victims
- Rape
- Rape investigation
- Rape kit
- Rise (non-governmental organization)
- Sexual assault
