= Rosalind Picard =

American computer scientist (born 1962)

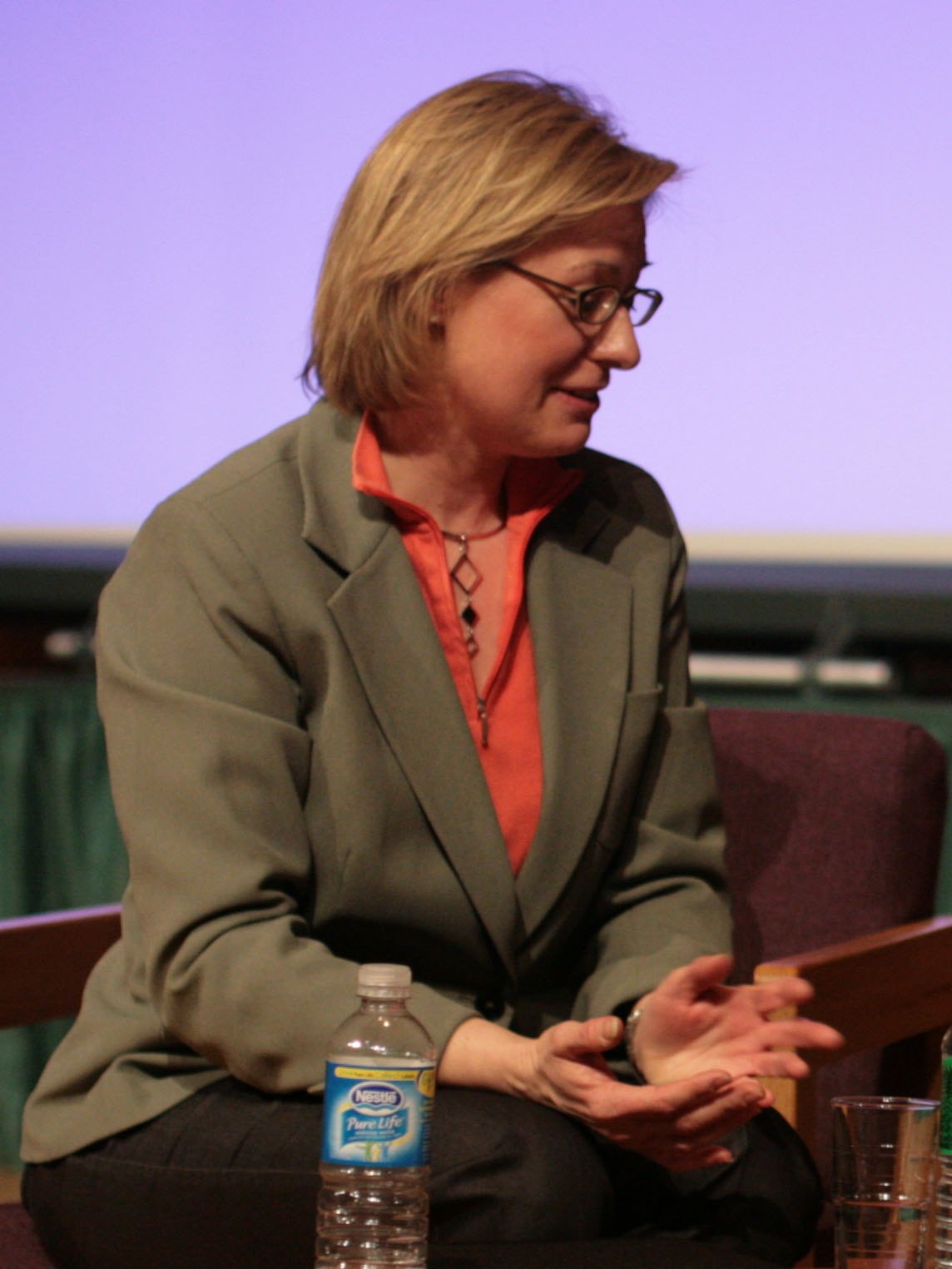
- Picard in 2007
- Born: 1962 (age 63–64)
- Education: Georgia Institute of Technology (BS); Massachusetts Institute of Technology (MS, DSc)
- Scientific career
- Fields: Electrical engineering Computer science
- Workplaces: MIT Media Lab
- Thesis: Texture modeling: Temperature effects on Markov/Gibbs random fields (1991)
- Doctoral advisor: Alex Pentland; Jae Soo Lim; Sanjoy K. Mitter
- Website: web.media.mit.edu/~picard/

Rosalind Wright Picard (born 1962) is an American electrical engineer and computer scientist who is the Grover M. Hermann Professor of Health Sciences and Technology at the Massachusetts Institute of Technology (MIT). She is the founder and director of the Affective Computing Research Group at the MIT Media Lab, and co-founder of the startups Affectiva and Empatica.

Prior to joining the MIT faculty, Picard worked from 1984-1987 as a Member of the Technical Staff at AT&T Bell Labs in Holmdel Township, New Jersey, first developing new VLSI-scale computer architectures for future high-speed signal processing chips and later researching new kinds of algorithms for image compression.

She has received many recognitions for her research and inventions in wearable and affective computing. In 2005, she was named a Fellow of the Institute of Electrical and Electronics Engineers for contributions to image and video analysis and affective computing. In 2019 she received one of the highest professional honors accorded an engineer, election to the National Academy of Engineering for her contributions on affective computing and wearable computing. In 2021 she was recognized as a Fellow of the ACM for contributions to physiological signal sensing for individual health and wellbeing. In 2021 she was elected to the National Academy of Inventors, which recognizes outstanding inventions that have made a tangible impact on quality of life, economic development and the welfare of society. In 2022 she was awarded the International Lombardy Prize for Computer Science Research, which carries a €1 million award, which she donated to support digital health and neurology research to help save the lives of people with epilepsy and children susceptible to sudden infant death syndrome. In 2026, she received one of the Institute of Electrical and Electronics Engineers's highest honors, the IEEE Medal for Innovations in Healthcare Technology for pioneering wearable affective computing.

Picard is credited with starting the branch of computer science known as affective computing with her 1997 book of the same name. This book described the importance of emotion in intelligence, the vital role human emotion communication has to relationships between people, how robots and wearable computers might perform emotion recognition and other skills of emotional intelligence, and concerns raised by this new technology. Her work in this field has led to an expansion into autism research and developing devices that could help humans recognize nuances in human emotions and provide objective data for improving healthcare. With Jonathan Klein, she also published a presentation and discussion of many potential uses, together with concerns and objections, regarding the deployment of affective technology to address emotional needs; in particular, they called out concerns about the potential misuse of technology to manipulate people.

== Academics ==
Picard received a bachelor's degree in electrical engineering from the Georgia Institute of Technology in 1984. She received a Master of Science in 1986 and a Doctor of Science in 1991, both in electrical engineering and computer science from the Massachusetts Institute of Technology. Her doctoral dissertation was titled Texture modeling: Temperature effects on Markov/Gibbs random fields.

Picard has been a member of the faculty at the MIT Media Laboratory since 1991, with tenure since 1998 and a full professorship since 2005. Picard is a researcher in the field of affective computing and the founder and director of the Affective Computing Research Group at the MIT Media Lab. The Affective Computing Research Group develops tools, techniques, and devices for sensing, interpreting, and processing signals related to emotion that drive state-of-the-art systems that respond intelligently to human emotional states. Applications of their research include physiological sensors used in medical studies and treatments and assistive technology for use in addressing the verbal communications difficulties experienced by individuals with autism.

She also works with Sherry Turkle and Cynthia Breazeal in the field of social robots, and has published significant work in the areas of digital image processing, pattern recognition, and wearable computers. Picard's former students include Steve Mann, professor and researcher in wearable computers.

Picard was the founding Faculty Chair of the MIT MindHandHeart Initiative, a "coalition of students, faculty, and staff [...] working collaboratively and strategically to strengthen the fabric of [the] MIT community".

=== Affective computing ===
As she began building systems to objectively measure emotion in people, including wearable and computer vision and audition technologies, she described a need for more research on an area of computing inspired by the rational roles emotion plays in the human brain. She wrote a book envisioning and describing this research, including laying out how to give skills of emotional intelligence to machines, titling the book "Affective Computing". MIT's press release for Picard's book states, "According to Rosalind Picard, if we want computers to be genuinely intelligent and to interact naturally with us, we must give computers the ability to recognize, understand, even to have and express emotions".

Picard explains the need to monitor emotional cues and how this is present with humans when she states:

"Whatever his strategy, the good teacher detects important affective cues from the student and responds differently because of them. For example, the teacher might leave subtle hints or clues for the student to discover, thereby preserving the learner's sense of self-propelled discovery. Whether the subject matter involves deliberate emotional expression as is the case with music, or is a "non-emotional" topic such as science, the teacher that attends to a student's interest, pleasure, and distress is perceived as more effective than the teacher that proceeds callously. The best teachers know that frustration usually precedes quitting, and know how to redirect or motivate the pupil at such times. They get to know their student, including how much distress that student can withstand before learning breaks down."

But such emotional cues are not part of robotic intelligence.

In order to portray how such a recognition would alter interactions with robots, Picard gave an example situation:

Imagine your robot entering the kitchen as you prepare breakfast for guests. The robot looks happy to see you and greets you with a cheery "Good morning." You mumble something it does not understand. It notices your face, vocal tone, smoke above the stove, and your slamming of a pot into the sink, and infers that you do not appear to be having a good morning. Immediately, it adjusts its internal state to "subdued", which has the effect of lowering its vocal pitch and amplitude settings, eliminating cheery behavioral displays, and suppressing unnecessary conversation. Suppose you exclaim, "Ow!!" yanking your hand from the hot stove, rushing to run your fingers under cold water, adding "I can't believe I ruined the sauce." While the robot's speech recognition may not have high confidence that it accurately recognized all of your words, its assessment of your affect and actions indicates a high probability that you are upset and maybe hurt.

In such a situation, it is necessary for the robots to understand the emotional aspects of humans in order to better serve their intended purpose.

Her work has influenced many fields beyond computer science, ranging from video games to law. One critic, Aaron Sloman, described the book as having a "bold vision" that will inspire some and irritate others. Other critics emphasize the importance of the work in establishing a framework for the field as a whole. Picard responded to Sloman's review by saying, "I don't think the review captures the flavor of the book. However, he does raise interesting points, as well as potential misunderstandings, both of which I am grateful for the opportunity to comment on".

In 2009, Picard co-founded Affectiva Inc, along with Rana el Kaliouby, and became the company's chief scientist for the next four years. The company was based on technologies the two began developing at the Affective Computing Research Group within the MIT Media Lab.

In 2013, Picard co-founded Empatica Inc, a business creating wearable sensors and analytics to help people understand and communicate physiological changes involved in emotion. Her team showed that physiological changes in the emotion system could help identify seizures that might be life-threatening, and help alert a person to be present at such times, which may reduce the risk of death from seizures.

=== Autism research ===
Besides researching robotic intelligence, Picard has performed research in the field of autism. Her team created an "emotional-social intelligence prosthesis" (ESP), that allowed a person diagnosed with autism to monitor their own facial reactions in order to educate them on social cues in others. This device had a 65% accuracy rate for reading one of eight emotional states from an individual's facial expressions and head movements. She revealed parts of this technology at the 11th Annual International Symposium on Wearable Computers.

=== Emotion research ===
Picard has put forward theories to improve the research of emotions through the implementation of new technologies with a focus to gather emotional information outside of a lab setting. With devices that can measure heart-rate, electrodermal activity, and other physiological changes, and that are non-obtrusive and simple to wear (Picard uses an example of the iCalm sensor) emotional responses can be more accurately observed in a real life. She also argues against nomothetic research over idiographic research when it comes to studying emotions claiming that an individualized approach would be more fruitful than just throwing out data when a group correlation is not found. In this way, data from individuals could still be kept and analyzed and then paired (not averaged) with data clusters that were similar.

== Religion and science ==
Picard was raised an atheist, but converted to Christianity as a young adult. She is a practicing Christian and does not believe there is a separation of the "material body and immaterial spirit" but that there is "something else that we haven't discovered yet", and believes "that scientists cannot assume that nothing exists beyond what they can measure". She believes it likely that there is "still something more" to life, beyond what we have discovered, and sees DNA as too complex to have originated through "purely random processes". To her, the complexity of life shows "the mark of intervention", and "a much greater mind, a much greater scientist, a much greater engineer behind who we are". She sees her religious beliefs as playing a role in her work in affective computing, and said that when "Digging into the models of how the emotions work, I find I feel even greater awe and appreciation for the way we are made, and therefore for the Maker that has brought this about."

Picard is one of the signatories of the Discovery Institute's A Scientific Dissent From Darwinism, a petition which states that: We are skeptical of claims for the ability of random mutation and natural selection to account for the complexity of life. Careful examination of the evidence for Darwinian theory should be encouraged. Although her view about the complexity of DNA "sounds similar to the intelligent design debate", reporter Mirko Petricevic writes, "Picard has some reservations about intelligent design, saying it isn't being sufficiently challenged by Christians and other people of faith". She argues that the media has created a false dilemma by dividing everyone into two groups, supporters of intelligent design or evolution. "To simply put most of us in one camp or the other does the whole state of knowledge a huge disservice."

== NeurIPS 2024 conference ==
Following her keynote address at the NeurIPS 2024 conference, Picard faced criticism for racial bias after she quoted a Chinese student while giving an example of improper AI use, while not mentioning the nationality of any other individuals in her examples. Her slide concurrently stated, "Most Chinese who I know are honest and morally upright." Yiran Chen, distinguished professor at Duke University, stated that singling out any nationalities was inappropriate.. Several researchers and professors also made comments criticizing Picard's Chinese reference. Afterward, the NeurIPS organizer posted an apology, writing, "NeurIPS does not condone and it doesn't align with our code of conduct". Picard later issued a public apology, saying that mentioning nationality was unnecessary and caused "unintended negative associations" that she deeply regretted.

== Awards ==
- Georgia Engineering Foundation Fellowship(s) 1980, '81, '82, '83
- Society of Women Engineers: "The Outstanding Woman Engineering Student" 1981, '82, '83, '84
- National Science Foundation Fellow 1984
- AT&T Bell Laboratories "One Year On Campus" Fellow 1984
- Georgia Institute of Technology Department of Electrical Engineering Faculty Award 1984
- Voted Omicron Delta Kappa, Georgia Tech and Southeast U. S. "Leader of the Year" 1984
- AAUW "The Outstanding Georgia Institute of Technology Woman Graduate" 1984
- IAPR Pattern Recognition Society Best Paper Prize (with Tom Minka) 1991
- GA Tech College of Engineering "Outstanding Young Engineering Alumni Award" 1995
- NEC Career Development Chair in Computers and Communications 1992, '96
- Assoc. of American Publishers, Inc. Computer Science Book Award, (Hon. Mention) 1997
- Senior Member of IEEE 2000
- Creapole's Committee of Honour (Paris) 2002
- Fellow of IEEE 2005
- Chamblee High School Hall of Fame 2005
- Groden Network Distinguished Honorees, Research Award 2008
- The New York Times "Best Ideas of the Year" (w/el Kaliouby) 2006
- Popular Science Top Ten Inventions of 2011: A mirror that reads vital signs 2011 (with Ming-Zher Poh and Dan McDuff)
- Best Paper of the Decade, 2000–2009 IEEE Transactions on Intelligent Transportation Systems (with Jennifer Healey) 2013
- Sigma Xi Walston Chubb Award for Innovation 2014
- Epilepsy Foundation Innovation Seal of Excellence (with Empatica) 2015
- CNN's 7 Tech Superheroes to Watch in 2015
- Association for Psychological Science Fellow 2017
- National Academy of Engineering 2019
- ACM Fellow 2021
- Lombardia è Ricerca Prize 2022
- Ubicomp 10-Year Impact Award (with Ehsan Hoque, et al.) 2023
- Trotter Prize of Texas A&M University, 2025
- IEEE Medal for Innovations in Healthcare Technology 2026

== Selected works as author ==
=== Books ===
- Picard, Rosalind W. (1997). Affective Computing. Cambridge, Massachusetts: MIT Press. ISBN 9780262161701.
- J. Tao, T. Tan, and R. W. Picard (Eds.), Affective Computing and Intelligent Interaction 2005, Lecture Notes in Computer Science 3784, 2005. Springer-Verlag, Berlin Heidelberg 2005.
- A. Paiva, R. Prada, and R. W. Picard (Eds.), Affective Computing and Intelligent Interaction 2007, Lecture Notes in Computer Science 4738, 2007. Springer-Verlag, Berlin Heidelberg 2007.

=== Articles ===
- T. P. Minka and R.W. Picard (1997), "Interactive Learning Using a 'Society of Models,'" Pattern Recognition, Volume 30, No. 4, pp. 565–581, 1997. (Winner of 1997 Pattern Recognition Society Award)
- R. W. Picard, E. Vyzas & J. Healey, (2001), "Toward machine emotional intelligence: Analysis of affective physiological state", IEEE Transactions on Pattern Analysis and Machine Intelligence, (10), 1175-1191.
- B. Kort, R. Reilly and R. W. Picard (2001), "An Affective Model of Interplay Between Emotions and Learning: Reengineering educational Pedagogy-Building a Learning Companion", in Proceedings of International Conference on Advanced Learning Technologies (ICALT 2001), August 2001, Madison, WI. (Winner of Best Paper Prize.)
- J. Healey and R. W. Picard (2005), "Detecting Stress During Real-World Driving Tasks Using Physiological Sensors", IEEE Trans. on Intelligent Transportation Systems, Volume 6, No. 2, June 2005, pp. 156–166. (Voted "Top 10 best papers of the decade 2000-2009" for IEEE Trans. on Intelligent Transportation Systems)
- M. E. Hoque, M. Courgeon, J.-C. Martin, B. Mutlu, R. W. Picard, "MACH: My Automated Conversation coacH", 15th International Conference on Ubiquitous Computing (Ubicomp), 8–12 September 2013. (winner of Best Ubiquitous Computing Paper Award from some organization)
- Rosalind W. Picard, Matteo Migliorini, Chiara Caborni, Francesco Onorati, Giulia Regalia, Daniel Friedman, and Orrin Devinsky. "Wrist sensor reveals sympathetic hyperactivity and hypoventilation before probable SUDEP". Neurology 89, no. 6 (2017): 633-635.
- Onorati, Francesco, Giulia Regalia, Chiara Caborni, Matteo Migliorini, Daniel Bender, Ming-Zher Poh, Cherise Frazier et al. "Multicenter clinical assessment of improved wearable multimodal convulsive seizure detectors". Epilepsia 58, no. 11 (2017): 1870–1879.

=== Patents ===
- "Method and Apparatus for Relating and Combining Multiple Images of the Same Scene or Object(s)" U.S. patent 5,706,416. Issued January 6, 1998. (With Steve Mann.)
- "Sensing and Display of Skin Conductivity" U.S. patent 6,415,176. Issued July 2, 2002. (With Jocelyn Scheirer, Nancy Tilbury and Jonathan Farringdon.)
- "System and Method for Determining a Workload Level of a Driver" U.S. patent 7,428,449. Issued Sep 23, 2008 (with Fehr, Gardner and Hansman).
- "Washable wearable biosensor" U.S. patent 8,140,143. Issued Mar 20, 2012 (with Williams, Fletcher, Eydgahi, Poh, Wilder-Smith, Kim, Dobson, Lee).
- "Methods and apparatus for Monitoring Patients and Delivering Therapeutic Stimuli" U.S. patent 8,655,441. Issued Feb 18, 2014 (with Fletcher, Eydgani and Williams).
- "Video recommendation based on affect" U.S. patent 9,106,958. Issued Aug 11, 2015 (with Kaliouby, Bahgat, Sadowsky and Wilder-Smith).
- "Using affect within a gaming context" U.S. patent 9,247,903. Issued February 2, 2016 (with Bender, Kaliouby, Picard, Sadowsky, Turcot, Wilder-Smith).
- "Methods and Apparatus for Conversation Coach" U.S. patent 9,691,296. Issued Jun 27, 2017 (with Hoque).
- "Methods and apparatus for physiological measurement using color band photoplethysmographic sensor" U.S. patent 10,028,669. Issued Jul 24, 2018 (with Gontarek and McDuff).

== See also ==
- Affectiva
- Affective computing
- Autism
- Digital image processing
- Empatica
- Pattern recognition
- Social robots
- Wearable computers
