= Gayle King =

American television personality and journalist (born 1954)

Gayle Patrice King
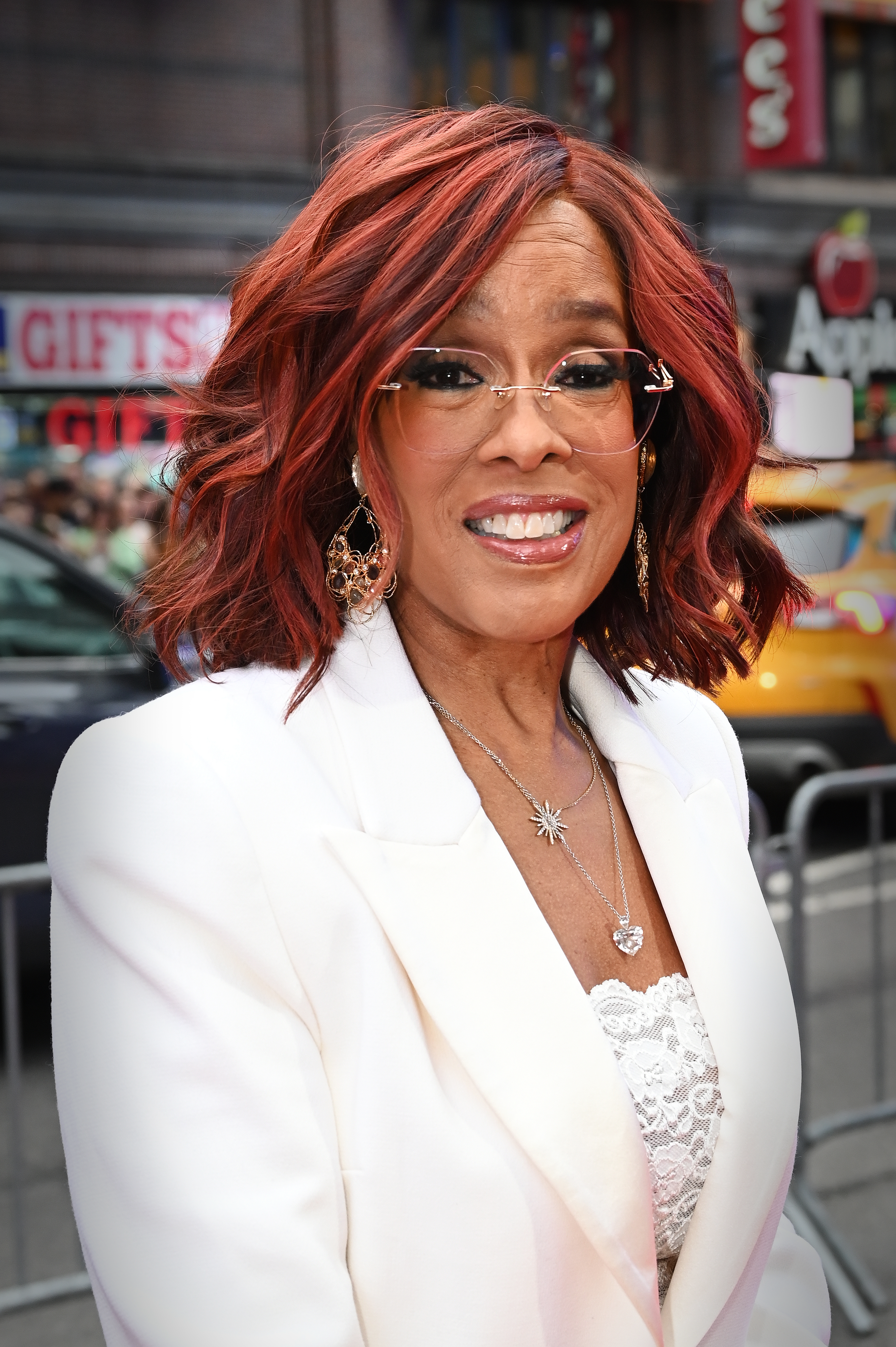
- King in 2025
- Born: Gayle Patrice King; December 28, 1954 (age 71); Chevy Chase, Maryland, U.S.
- Education: University of Maryland, College Park
- Occupations: Broadcast journalist; Magazine editor
- Years active: 1981–present
- Title: Co-anchor of CBS Mornings; Editor-at-large of O, The Oprah Magazine
- Spouse: William G. Bumpus (m. 1982; div. 1993)
- Children: 2

Gayle Patrice King (born December 28, 1954) is an American television personality, author and broadcast journalist for CBS News, co-hosting its flagship morning program, CBS Mornings, and before that its predecessor CBS This Morning. She is also an editor-at-large for Oprah Daily. King was named one of Time magazine's "100 Most Influential People of 2019".

== Early life ==
King born on December 28, 1954, in Chevy Chase, Maryland, a suburb of Washington D.C. Her parents are Peggy Tucker and Emmett Scott King. From age six to eleven she lived in Ankara, Turkey, where her father was deployed. In 1966 she returned with her family to the United States, where her father worked as an electrical engineer. King graduated from the University of Maryland, College Park, with a degree in psychology.

== Career ==
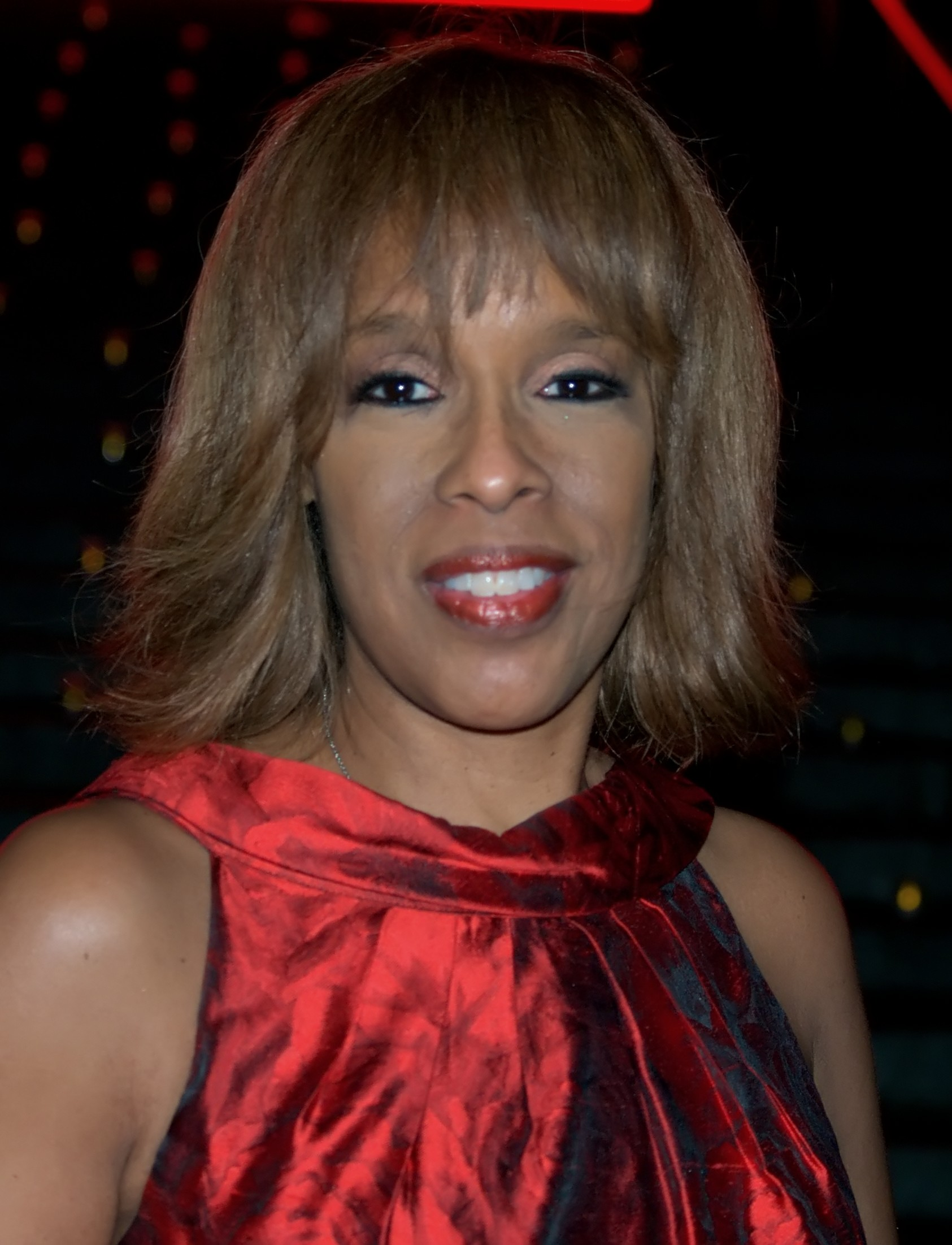
King in 2009

=== Television broadcast news ===
King began her career as a production assistant at WJZ-TV in Baltimore, where she met Oprah Winfrey, an anchor for the station at the time. King later trained as a reporter at WUSA-TV in Washington, D.C. After working at WJZ, she moved to Kansas City, Missouri, where she was a weekend anchor and general-assignment reporter at WDAF-TV. In 1981, she was hired as a news anchor for WFSB in Hartford, Connecticut, where she worked for 18 years. Part of that time, she lived in Glastonbury, Connecticut.

=== Talk shows and morning news co-anchor ===
King worked as a special correspondent for The Oprah Winfrey Show. In 1991, King briefly co-hosted an NBC daytime talk show with Robin Wagner called Cover to Cover, which was canceled after 13 weeks. In 1997, she was offered her own syndicated talk show, The Gayle King Show, which was canceled after one season due to low ratings. In September 2006, King began to host The Gayle King Show on XM Satellite Radio.

On January 3, 2011, King began hosting a new show, also called The Gayle King Show, on OWN. The Gayle King Show ended on November 17, 2011, as a result of King going to CBS to co-anchor CBS This Morning alongside Charlie Rose and a series of third co-anchors including for a time Norah O'Donnell. The show succeeded in the ratings. King and Rose were noted as having good on-air chemistry. The two became friends as well, and remained friends even after Rose exited from CBS due to the sexual misconduct allegations against him.

=== Print journalism ===
King joined O, The Oprah Magazine as an editor in 1999.

=== Network news ===
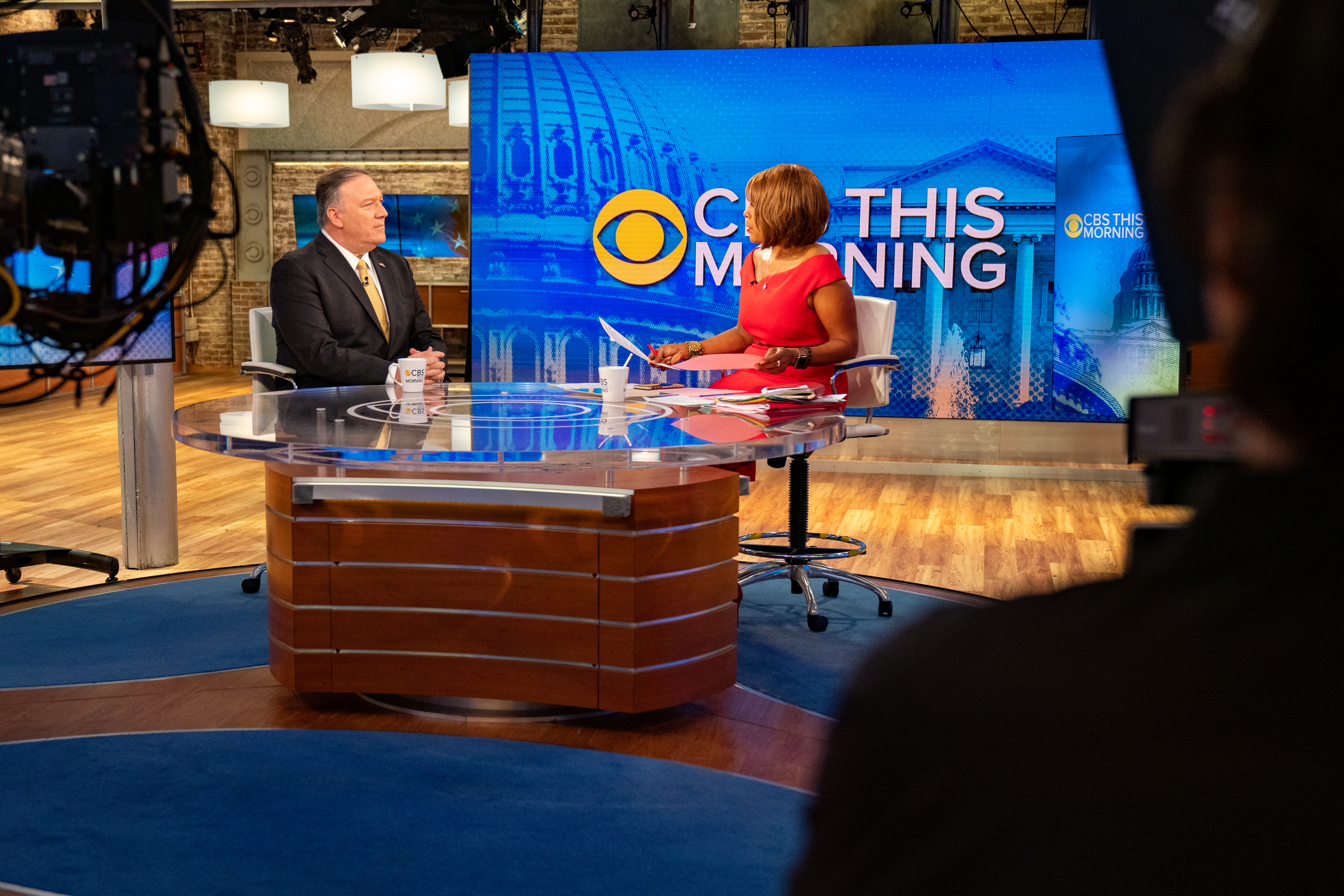
King interviews Secretary of State Mike Pompeo on CBS This Morning in 2019.

Before joining CBS News, King worked as a special correspondent for Good Morning America. On November 10, 2011, King secured a deal with CBS to co-anchor CBS This Morning, beginning on January 9, 2012. She publicly called for CBS to have full transparency when it was learned CBS planned on keeping the findings of sexual abuse and harassment at the network private. She received recognition for remaining stoic during an interview with R. Kelly, who rose from his chair and began to scream and beat his chest in an interview discussing the sexual abuse allegations made against him.

In 2018, King was inducted into the Broadcasting & Cable Hall of Fame. She was also chosen as one of Time magazine's 100 most influential people of 2019.

In 2020, shortly after the death of Kobe Bryant, King received social media criticism for a CBS This Morning interview with former WNBA player Lisa Leslie, in which King brought up Bryant's sexual assault allegations from 2003. Rapper Snoop Dogg was among those who criticized King, though he later apologized. She received support, particularly from long-time friend Oprah Winfrey. King said CBS had used an out-of-context excerpt from the interview. The network said in a statement that the excerpt was not reflective of the "thoughtful, wide-ranging interview" King had conducted with Leslie.

In January 2022, King had extended her contract with CBS News to continue as co-anchor of CBS Mornings.

On April 22, 2023, CNN announced that King will co-host with Charles Barkley on their weekly primetime show King Charles which debuted that fall and ended the next spring. King continued her role as co-anchor of CBS Mornings.

== Personal life ==
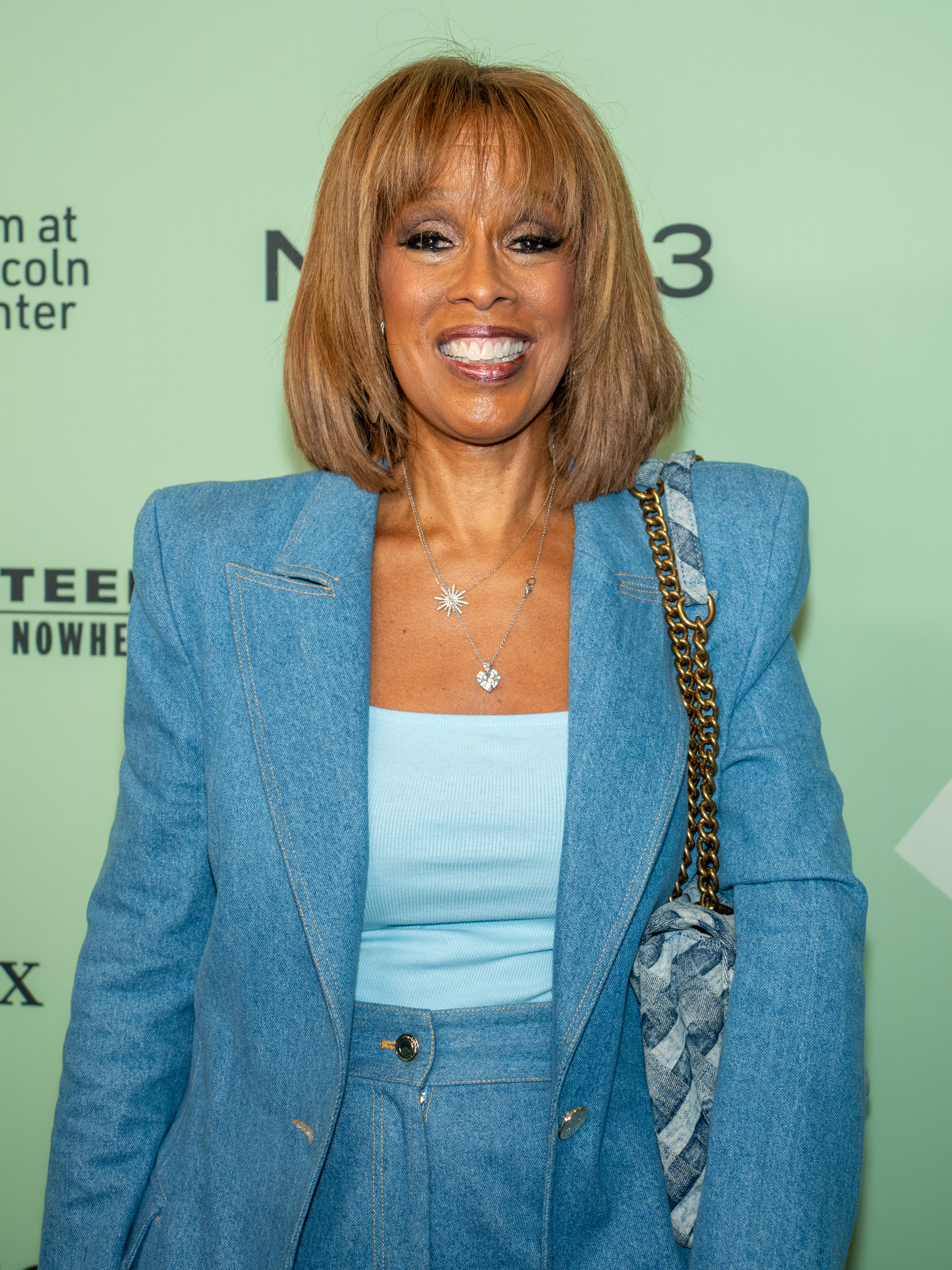
King in 2025

King has been a close friend of Oprah Winfrey since 1976. In a 2010 interview with Barbara Walters, Winfrey said of King, "She is the mother I never had; she is the sister everybody would want; she is the friend everybody deserves; I don't know a better person".

From 1982 to 1993, King was married to William Bumpus, an attorney and an assistant attorney general in Connecticut. They share a daughter, Kirby, and a son, William Bumpus Jr.

=== Space tourism ===
On February 27, 2025, it was announced that King would be one of the passengers on Blue Origin's eleventh flight to space under the New Shepard program, along with Katy Perry, Amanda Nguyen, Aisha Bowe, Kerianne Flynn and Lauren Sánchez. The Blue Origin NS-31 launch took place on April 14, 2025. This flight made King and Sánchez the first female journalists to fly to space as well as part of the first flight in which everyone onboard was female since Valentina Tereshkova's solo 1963 flight on Vostok 6.

== Filmography ==
Year	Title	Role	Ref.
1985	The Color Purple	Church-goer	uncredited
2004	The Manchurian Candidate	Media Icon	
2012	30 Rock	Herself	Episode: My Whole Life is Thunder
2015	Being Mary Jane	Herself	Episode: No Eggspectations
2015	Saturday Night Live	Herself	Episode: Tina Fey & Amy Poehler/Bruce Springsteen
2016	The Boss	Herself	
2017, 2021	Queen Sugar	Herself	2 episodes
2019	Queen and Slim	Herself	
2021	The Game	Herself	Episode: Snips, Clips, and Chair Sits
2022	Billions	Herself	Episode: The Big Ugly
2024	The Trainer		

== Awards and nominations ==
=== Emmy Awards ===
Year	Award	Nominated work	Result
Daytime Emmy Awards
2014	Outstanding Morning Program	CBS This Morning	Nominated
2016	Outstanding Morning Program	CBS This Morning	Nominated
2017	Outstanding Morning Program	CBS This Morning	Nominated
2018	Outstanding Morning Program	CBS This Morning	Nominated
2019	Outstanding Morning Program	CBS This Morning	Nominated
2020	Outstanding Morning Program	CBS This Morning	Nominated
News and Documentary Emmy Awards
2017	Outstanding Coverage of a Breaking News Story in a Newscast	CBS Evening News: "Orlando Pulse Nightclub Shooting"	Nominated
2018	Outstanding Coverage of a Breaking News Story in a Newscast	CBS Evening News: "Las Vegas Massacre"	Nominated
2019	Outstanding Continuing Coverage of a News Story in a Newscast	CBS Evening News: "Catholic Church Sex Abuse Scandal"	Nominated
2020	Outstanding Hard News Feature Story in a Newscast	CBS This Morning: "R. Kelly Breaks His Silence"	Nominated
2021	Outstanding Investigative Report in a Newscast	CBS This Morning: "Toxic Legacy"	Nominated
2021	Outstanding Investigative Report in a Newscast	CBS This Morning: "Escaping Justice: U.S. Sex Crime Suspects Using Legal Loophole to Move to Israel"	Nominated
2022	Outstanding Technical Achievement	The Queen Carries On: A Gayle King Special	Nominated
2022	Outstanding Live News Special	CBS This Morning	Won

=== Miscellaneous awards and honors ===
Year	Organization	Award	Nominated work	Result
2018	Broadcasting and Cable Hall of Fame		Herself	Inducted
2019	MTV Movie & TV Awards	Best Host	CBS This Morning	Nominated

== See also ==
- New Yorkers in journalism
