= Rise (non-governmental organization) =

American organization

Rise, Inc. is an American non-governmental civil rights organization working with multiple state legislatures and the U.S. Congress to implement a sexual assault survivors' bill of rights. Its founder and president is Amanda Nguyen.

In October 2016, the Sexual Assault Survivors' Rights Act was enacted in the United States.

== History ==
In November 2014, Nguyen founded Rise, a nonprofit organisation which is aimed to protect the civil rights of sexual assault and rape survivors. In 2013, she had been raped while attending college in Massachusetts. Nguyen headed the organisation in her spare time until September 2016. Everyone who works with Rise is a volunteer, and the organisation has raised money through GoFundMe. Nguyen explained that the organisation was named Rise to "remind us that a small group of thoughtful, committed citizens can rise up and change the world."

== See also ==
- Post-assault treatment of sexual assault victims
