= Kerianne Flynn =

American film producer

- Occupation: Film producer
- Years active: 2015–present
- Known for: The Automatic Hate, This Changes Everything, Lilly, 2025 flight into space

Kerianne Flynn is a former human resources executive, film producer, socialite, and space tourist. She has contributed to several film projects, including The Automatic Hate (2015), This Changes Everything (2018), and Lilly (2024). On April 14, 2025, she flew into space as part of the all-female crew of Blue Origin's NS-31 sub-orbital mission.

== Career ==
After graduating from North Adams College, Flynn served as a human resources professional in the fashion and beauty industry, including for French Connection, bebe, and divisions of The Limited including Limited Design and Victoria's Secret Beauty.

Flynn serves on the board of RxArt (2008–present), the Art Advisory Board for the Coalition for the Homeless (2011–present), the Women’s Leadership Committee for The Children’s Health Fund (2015–present) and the Playground Committee for Friends of Hudson River Park (2015–present). She has been on the Board of Directors of City Winery since 2009.

Flynn received producing credits on The Automatic Hate (2015), This Changes Everything (2018), and Lilly (2024).

In 2011, she signed up to fly as a passenger on a Virgin Galactic spaceflight. Although her Virgin Galactic flight has not yet occurred, she was part of Blue Origin’s New Shepard NS-31 mission. On February 27, 2025, Blue Origin announced that Flynn would join an all-female crew with Katy Perry, Amanda Nguyen, Aisha Bowe, Gayle King, and Lauren Sánchez, for a suborbital flight, which took place on April 14, 2025, from Launch Site One in West Texas.

== Personal life ==
Flynn lives in a penthouse in the Tribeca neighborhood of New York City with her husband, Jim Flynn, and their son.

== Filmography ==
- The Automatic Hate (2015) – Producer
- This Changes Everything (2018) – Producer
- Lilly (2024) – Producer
- Top of the World (2026) - Executive Producer
