= King Charles (news program) =

- Genre: News
- Presented by: Gayle King and Charles Barkley
- Country of origin: United States

Production
- Running time: 60 minutes

Original release
- Network: CNN
- Release: November 29, 2023 – April 10, 2024

King Charles is an American news discussion show that was broadcast on Wednesday evenings by CNN, and globally on CNN International, between November 29, 2023, and April 10, 2024. The program was hosted by Gayle King and Charles Barkley. King is a co-host of CBS Mornings and Barkley is a panelist on Inside the NBA, which is also produced by CNN's parent company Warner Bros. Discovery.

== History ==
The show was the brainchild of former CNN chief Chris Licht, who had wanted more personality-based programming. Licht pitched the series to King and Barkley separately who later had a "secret meeting" before joining. The details were announced in April 2023 during the NBA playoffs.

The program replaced CNN NewsNight with Abby Phillip on Wednesdays. The program was described as "a talk show centered around the news stories and cultural moments that Gayle and Charles are most interested in" and not a straight newscast. King and Barkley interview both political and cultural figures and take calls from media personalities. The program is prerecorded, which makes it subject to preemption due to breaking news events.

The first episode drew 501,000 viewers which was the lowest-rated program of the three major cable news networks and 140,000 less than the debut of NewsNight the previous month; it is also CNN's lowest-rated debut in a decade. The second episode garnered 466,000 viewers, including 115,000 in the 25–54 age demographic.

On the April 10 broadcast, the hosts announced that the show would be the final episode. According to CNN, the show was planned as a limited series to begin with and they decided not to extend the length of it afterwards.
