= The Gayle King Show =

Television series

- Presented by: Gayle King
- Country of origin: United States
- No. of seasons: 1
- No. of episodes: 130

Production
- Production locations: NEP Studios; New York City, New York
- Running time: 60 minutes

Original release
- Network: Oprah Winfrey Network (OWN)
- Release: January 3 – November 17, 2011

The Gayle King Show is the name of several programs which have been hosted by Gayle King, friend and business associate of Oprah Winfrey.

== Syndicated program ==
The first show to be called The Gayle King Show was a half-hour syndicated television show which lasted one season, running from 1997 to 1998.

== Radio and OWN program ==
In September 2006, King began hosting a new program on Winfrey's XM Satellite Radio channel, which was also broadcast online; the show later moved to syndication on Westwood One. On January 3, 2011, King began hosting an hour-long daily televised version of the radio show on OWN: Oprah Winfrey Network.

On November 10, 2011, King secured a deal with CBS to co-host the second incarnation CBS This Morning, the replacement of The Early Show, beginning on January 9, 2012. As a result, The Gayle King Show ended on November 17, 2011.
