= Blue Origin NS-31 =

2025 sub-orbital human spaceflight

- Mission type: Sub-orbital human spaceflight
- Mission duration: 10 minutes, 21 seconds
- Apogee: 107 km (66 mi)

Spacecraft properties
- Spacecraft: RSS Kármán Line
- Manufacturer: Blue Origin

Crew
- Crew size: 6
- Members: Aisha Bowe; Amanda Nguyen; Gayle King; Katy Perry; Kerianne Flynn; Lauren Sánchez

Start of mission
- Launch date: April 14, 2025, 13:30:00 UTC (8:30 am CDT)
- Rocket: New Shepard (NS5)
- Launch site: Corn Ranch, LS-1
- Contractor: Blue Origin

End of mission
- Landing date: April 14, 2025, 13:40:21 UTC (8:40:21 am CDT)
- Landing site: Corn Ranch
- Mission patch New Shepard flights

Blue Origin NS-31 was a sub-orbital spaceflight operated by Blue Origin as part of New Shepard, the company's space tourism program. The flight took place on April 14, 2025, and lasted 10 minutes and 21 seconds. The flight carried all female passengers and was organized by journalist Lauren Sánchez, the then-fiancée of Blue Origin founder Jeff Bezos. She was joined by Aisha Bowe, Kerianne Flynn, Gayle King, Amanda Nguyen and Katy Perry.

NS-31 received widespread media attention for its symbolic significance of being the first all-female spaceflight since Soviet cosmonaut Valentina Tereshkova became the first woman in space in 1963, making a solo flight on Vostok 6. Overall, the reception to the flight was predominantly negative, with criticism of its messaging and timing.

== Passengers ==
Position	Passenger
Tourist	(United States) Lauren Sánchez; First spaceflight
Tourist	(United States) Katy Perry; First spaceflight
Tourist	(United States) Amanda Nguyen; First spaceflight
Tourist	(United States) (The Bahamas) Aisha Bowe; First spaceflight
Tourist	(United States) Gayle King; First spaceflight
Tourist	(United States) Kerianne Flynn; First spaceflight

== Mission ==
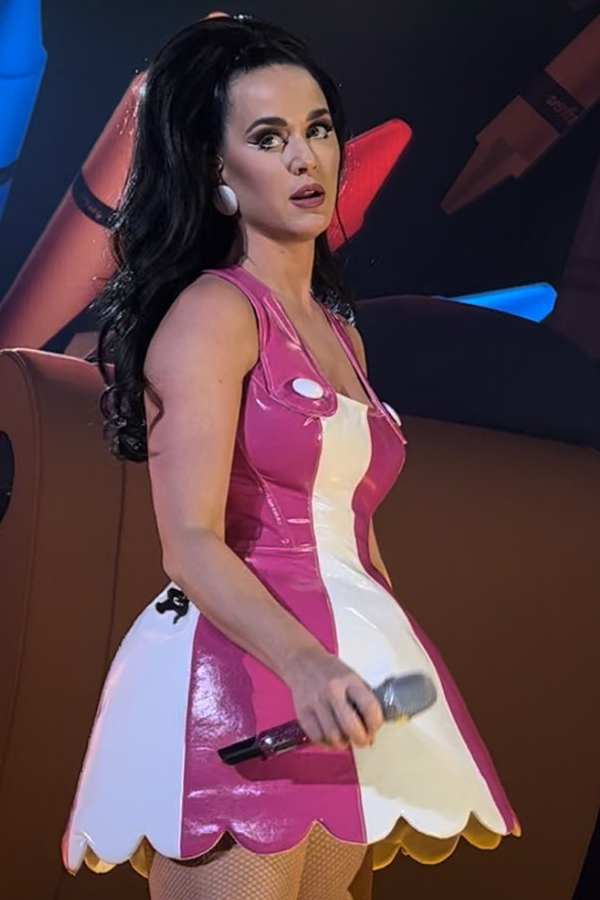
Katy Perry flew on the mission.

The six-person mission was the eleventh launch of Jeff Bezos's Blue Origin New Shepard space tourism program, which uses remotely piloted launch rockets to take a capsule with passengers into sub-orbital space. The flight was organized by pilot and journalist Lauren Sánchez, Bezos's then-fiancée and later wife, and its passengers were announced on February 27, 2025: Sánchez, the NASA aerospace engineer Aisha Bowe, the pop singer Katy Perry, the film producer Kerianne Flynn, the civil rights activist Amanda Nguyen, and the journalist Gayle King. Nguyen had previously trained to be an astronaut, but shifted towards activism after being sexually assaulted.

New "spacesuits", specifically designed for women, were created by Monse, a fashion house founded by creative directors formerly associated with Oscar de la Renta. However, like other New Shepard sub-orbital flights, these are not actually spacesuits and do not serve any function such as protecting against decompression. NS-31 was the first spaceflight with only female space passengers since the 1963 Vostok 6 solo mission, in which Soviet cosmonaut Valentina Tereshkova became the first woman in space. Nguyen became the first woman of Vietnamese descent, and Bowe the first Bahamian person, to fly to space.

The flight took off from the Blue Origin Launch Site southeast of El Paso, Texas on April 14, 2025, at 13:30:00 UTC (8:30 am CDT, local time at the launch site). It lasted 10 minutes and 21 seconds, including a few minutes of weightlessness for the passengers on board, and passed the Kármán line, the edge of space. While in flight, Perry sang part of Louis Armstrong's "What a Wonderful World" and held both a piece of paper with the setlist for her upcoming The Lifetimes Tour and a daisy in tribute to her daughter of that name.

The spacecraft touched back down safely in a desert around 11 minutes after liftoff, where they were greeted by a ground crew that included Bezos. Among those present at the event were Khloe Kardashian, Kris Jenner, Oprah Winfrey, and Mae Jemison.

== Reception ==
The mission drew largely negative reactions. Some commentators criticized the framing of the flight as a feminist milestone, arguing it was undermined by Bezos's political donations to Republican candidates opposing abortion rights and supporting "the ongoing erasure of women". Moira Donegan criticized the mission for emphasizing appearance over substantive achievements, noting Perry's own stated objective that "we are going to put the 'ass' in astronaut". Public figures including Lily Allen, Miquita Oliver, Emily Ratajkowski and Olivia Munn criticized the flight as an expensive recreational activity rather than a scientific mission, amid a period of heightened economic anxiety, while others such as Amy Schumer, Olivia Wilde, Wendy's, and Kesha uploaded posts to social media mocking the flight. Perry's participation was also singled out for criticism. She later stated that she did regret turning it into a "public spectacle".

Criticism also came from Secretary of Transportation Sean Duffy, who argued that the passengers did not qualify as astronauts under Federal Aviation Administration guidelines. In response to Duffy, Eric Berger of Ars Technica noted that New Shepard passengers had long been recognized as space travelers by the agency. Some commentary praised aspects of the mission, with retired NASA astronaut Mike Massimino emphasizing its potential to inspire public interest in space exploration. Melanie McFarland of Salon highlighted Nguyen's milestone as the first Vietnamese woman to enter space.

Responding to the criticism, King stated that the spaceflight was "bigger than one man or one company" and that she hoped people could separate the two. In interviews, Nguyen noted that she was neither wealthy, nor a celebrity, and acknowledged the problems with resource-intensive space travel amid the economic conditions on Earth. Perry told the Associated Press that she was going on the mission solely because "it's an important moment for the future of commercial space travel, for humanity in general, and for women."
