= Translational Research Institute for Space Health =

Space medicine consortium

The Translational Research Institute for Space Health (TRISH) is a virtual, applied research consortium that pursues and funds translational research and technologies to keep astronauts healthy during space exploration, with the added benefit of potential applications on Earth. TRISH is specifically focused on human health in preparation for deep space exploration efforts, including National Aeronautics and Space Administration's (NASA) Artemis missions to the Moon, and future human missions to Mars. TRISH also supports research to collect and study biomedical data gathered on commercial spaceflight missions to better understand the effect of spaceflight on the human body.

The consortium is led by Baylor College of Medicine's Center for Space Medicine, and includes Massachusetts Institute of Technology, and California Institute of Technology, with funding awarded to scientists and organizations around the United States. Empowered by NASA's Human Research Program (HRP), TRISH works to establish and coordinate research efforts that align with NASA’s goal of safely furthering human exploration while mitigating risks to human health.

== History ==
TRISH was founded in 2016, and Baylor College of Medicine was selected as the lead institution in an agreement with a maximum potential value of $246 million for 12 years. TRISH succeeded the National Space Biomedical Research Institute (NSBRI), a similar research institute also led by Baylor College of Medicine.

TRISH supports NASA's Human Research Program (HRP), founded in 2005, as outlined in TRISH's strategic plan. The goals of the HRP are to provide knowledge and technology to mitigate risks to human health and performance and develop tools to enable safe and productive human space exploration.

== Effects of space on the human body ==
In January 2023, The Washington Post reported an interactive feature on the known effects of space travel to the human body, and noted TRISH's work. In the article, former TRISH Chief Medical Officer Emmanuel Urquieta stated “Space is just not very hospitable to the human body,” explaining that humans evolved on Earth with abundant gravity and low radiation, whereas space is characterized by minimal gravity and higher radiation exposure.

This environment can lead astronauts to experience space adaptation syndrome, muscle atrophy, decreased blood volume, altered immunity and DNA damage from radiation exposure, loss of bone, sensory changes, psychological stress, and inflammation, among other potential complications. Interventions to prevent these outcomes include routine exercise while in space, as well as pharmaceutical and dietary supplements. Additionally, changes in blood flow and digestion rate are likely to affect how the body processes and tolerates medications, an area requiring further study.

Trips to the Moon and Mars will require astronauts to spend more time in space than ever before, potentially exacerbating known deleterious effects of space travel to the human body. In April 2022, NPR's Brendan Byrne described one of TRISH's goals as “to understand how and why the body changes while in space and prepar[e] future astronauts for those health effects. That's important to understand if space agencies like NASA want to send humans to places like the Moon or Mars. Those trips could be longer than Vande Hei [‘s] almost yearlong mission. And the environments on the lunar surface and the red planet will be harsh, with limited medical resources.”

== Leadership ==
TRISH's leadership includes executive director Dorit B. Donoviel, deputy director Jimmy Wu, scientific research director Rihana Bokhari, and chief operations and communications officer Rachael Dempsey.

TRISH's board of directors includes chair Jeffrey P. Sutton, along with members Barbara Wold, and Thomas Heldt.

== Consortium members ==
- Baylor College of Medicine
- Massachusetts Institute of Technology
- California Institute of Technology

== Research areas ==
TRISH researchers pursue scientific research in several fields, including:

- Cellular and Molecular Biology
- Behavioral Health
- Environment, Food and Medication
- Medical Technology
- Radiation

=== EXPAND ===
In 2021, TRISH launched the EXPAND (Enhancing Exploration Platforms and Analog Definition) Program, a research initiative designed focused on human health and performance during commercial spaceflight.

It collects health data before, during, and after missions from willing private astronauts to study challenges associated with long-duration missions, including medical risk detection, radiation exposure, behavioral health, and team dynamics. TRISH developed a novel approach to streamline research participation by integrating multiple studies across different researchers into the EXPAND program, seeking to build a standardized, centralized, and comprehensive database and biological samples repository. The program ensures ethical participation and facilitates open-access, de-identified data sharing with researchers with hypothesis-driven questions, supporting the broader scientific community in developing safeguards for future space travelers.

Data requests are reviewed by the EXPAND Database Privacy and Release Board (DPRB), an independent panel of experts in genetics, astronautics, data science, and bioethics. The board ensures data privacy and compliance with ethical protocols. Broader data access is anticipated beginning in late 2025.

=== HERMES ===
HERMES is a data integration and analytics platform developed by TRISH to support biomedical research and healthcare delivery in space. It enables the secure collection, aggregation, and analysis of data from biosensors, clinical evaluations, and mission environments, allowing for real-time monitoring and longitudinal tracking of spaceflight participants’ health across different missions and vehicles.

The platform is designed to be vehicle-agnostic and interoperable, ensuring that individual health records follow astronauts between providers and missions.

By centralizing access for clinicians, researchers, and participants, HERMES supports remote care, early risk detection, personalized countermeasures, and long-term monitoring. Its architecture also has potential Earth-based applications, being developed to address the challenge of fragmented healthcare data across systems.

== Involvement with private spaceflight missions ==
As part of its EXPAND (Enhancing eXploration Platforms and Analog Definition) Program, TRISH has partnered with several commercial space providers on private spaceflight missions to gather spaceflight participant health data before, during, and after space travel. These may include tests on motor function, eye health, motion sickness, and cognitive wellbeing, among others.

TRISH-funded researchers have collected biomedical data from spaceflight participants aboard the Inspiration4 mission, multiple Axiom missions (Axiom Mission 1, Axiom Mission 2, Axiom Mission 3) and Space Adventures’ MZ Mission. In 2024, TRISH researchers have also collected biomedical data from astronauts on the Polaris Dawn mission and entered an agreement with Blue Origin to collect biomedical data during suborbital missions, starting with the Blue Origin NS-28 suborbital flight.

Biomedical data gathered from private spaceflight participants adds to the diversity and volume of data available for space health researchers. TRISH maintains a centralized research database, the EXPAND Program, which hosts pre-, in-, and post-flight health data from multiple commercial space flights.

== Funding for researchers and companies ==
TRISH offers funding for innovative research and technology projects through several mechanisms. TRISH's open solicitations are housed on the institute's Grant Research Integrated Dashboard (GRID), an online portal, or the NASA NSPIRES portal. Previous solicitation topics have requested proposals on topics such as endogenous repair, metabolic manipulation, microphysiological systems, such as tissue-on-a-chip, technologies in support of autonomous health care, and the training of postdoctoral fellows and future scientists in the field.
