= BioServe Space Technologies =

Research institute at the University of Colorado

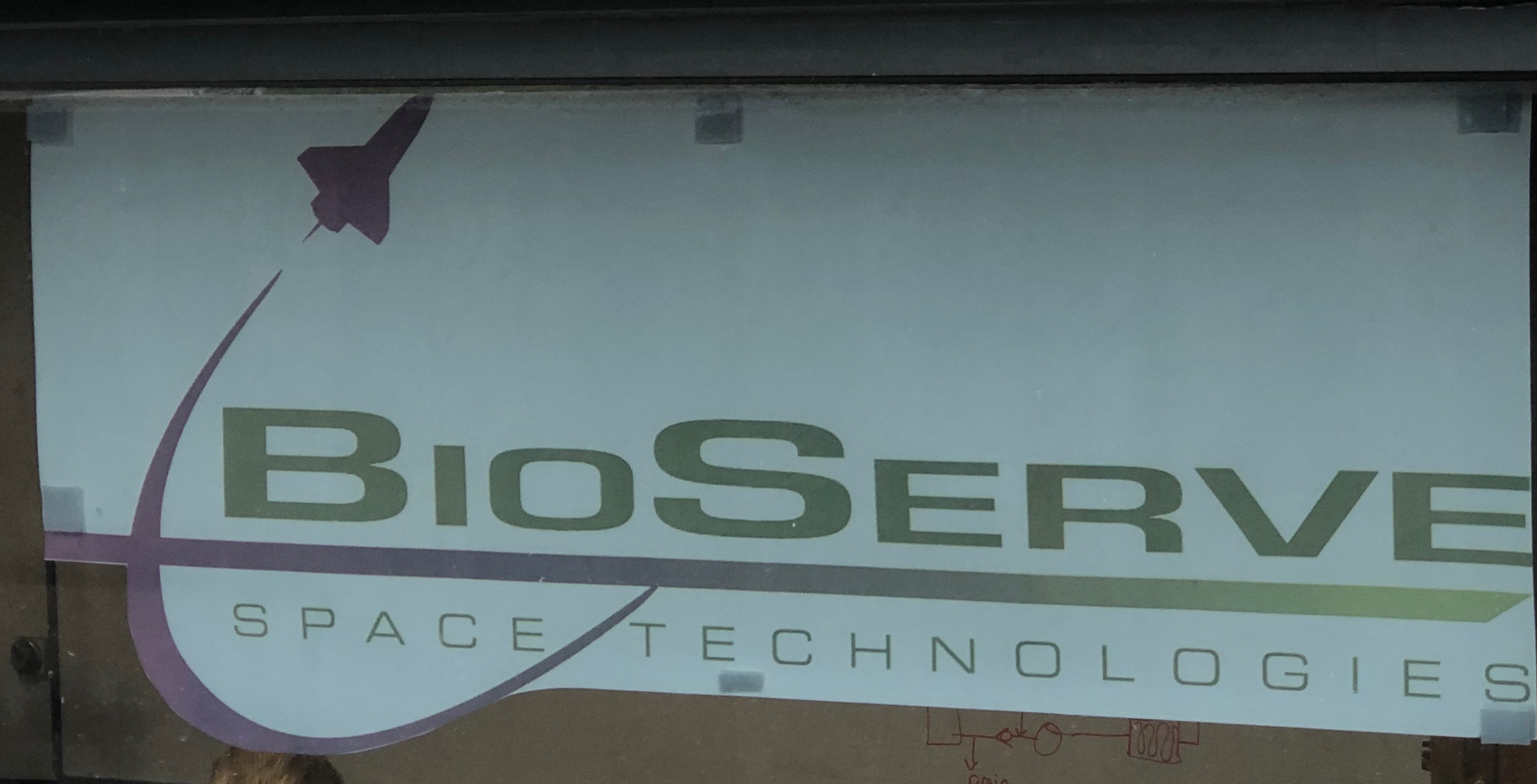
- BioServe logo at the ECAE wing, University of Colorado
- Formation: 1987
- Purpose: Microgravity life science research
- Headquarters: Boulder, Colorado, US
- Coordinates: 40°0′26.1″N 105°15′45.8″W
- Parent organization: University of Colorado
- Website: www.colorado.edu/engineering/BioServe/

BioServe Space Technologies is a research institute within the University of Colorado in Boulder, Colorado. Since its foundation in 1987 it focuses on developing microgravity life science research and hardware. Its current Chief Scientist is Prof. Louis Stodieck and the Center Director is Ms. Stefanie Countryman. BioServe has designed, built and flown over 50 different payloads on over 85 space flight missions including the Space Shuttle, ISS, MIR, Soyuz, and Progress and recently the SpaceX's Dragon capsule and Orbital's Cygnus spacecraft.

In 2011, BioServe was selected to be the official payload developer for the YouTube Space Lab - a contest where students were able to propose micro gravitational research and BioServe would develop the winner's experiment hardware and perform all of the mission integration and operations work. BioServe Space Technologies was also the designer of the Commercial Generic Bioprocessing Apparatus (CGBA) which is a temperature controlled incubator for experiments on cells, microbes, and plants currently in use on the ISS.

In August 2023, BioServe announced that would be collaborating with Sierra Space to grow hematopoietic stem cells in microgravity to research undergoing treatment for blood cancer.
