= Lauren Sánchez Bezos =

American philanthropist and former journalist (born 1969)

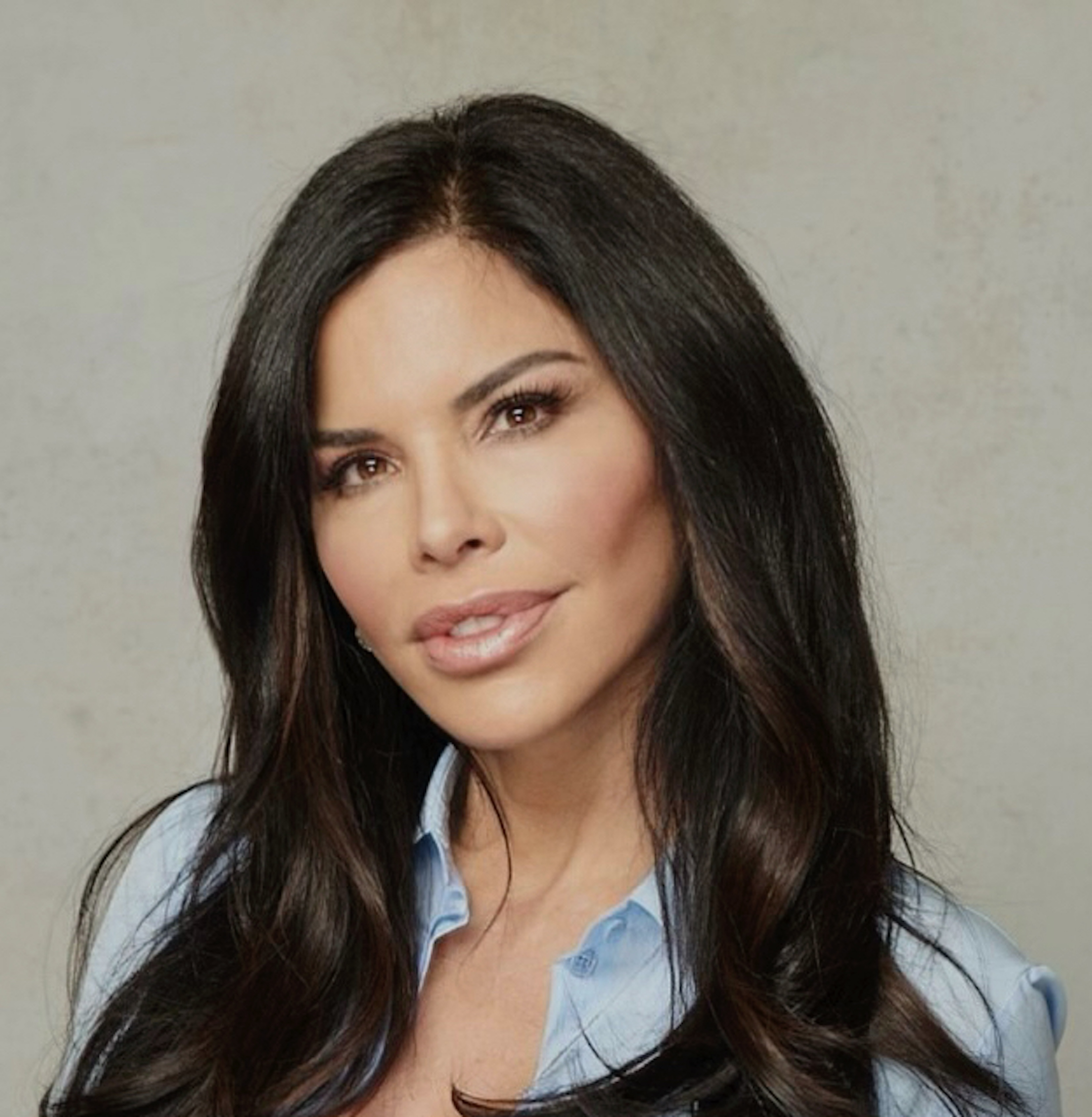
- Sánchez Bezos in 2022
- Born: Lauren Wendy Sánchez; December 19, 1969 (age 56); Albuquerque, New Mexico, U.S.
- Occupations: News anchor; media personality
- Years active: 1997–2025
- Spouses: Patrick Whitesell (m. 2005; div. 2019) Jeff Bezos (m. 2025)
- Partner: Tony Gonzalez (2000–2002)
- Children: 3

Lauren Wendy Sánchez Bezos (née Sánchez; born December 19, 1969) is an American former journalist. She is a licensed pilot and founder of Black Ops Aviation, an aerial film and production company. Sánchez has been a guest host on The View, co-host on KTTV Fox 11's Good Day L.A. and anchor on the Fox 11 News at Ten, and anchor and special correspondent on Extra. She has also been a regular contributor on shows including Larry King Live, The Joy Behar Show and Showbiz Tonight.

In 2024, Sánchez released her debut children's book, The Fly Who Flew to Space, which became a New York Times bestseller. On April 14, 2025, Sánchez flew as a passenger in Blue Origin NS-31, an all-female spaceflight aboard the New Shepard rocket. In June 2025, Sánchez married Amazon founder Jeff Bezos, the fourth-richest person in the world.

== Early life and education ==
Lauren Wendy Sánchez was born on December 19, 1969, in Albuquerque, New Mexico, to Ray Sánchez, a flight instructor and mechanic, and Eleanor Sánchez, a former Los Angeles assistant deputy mayor. Sánchez describes herself as "third-generation Mexican-American". Her grandmother helped take care of her during her childhood. She attended Del Norte High School, participating in cheerleading and student assembly, and working at The Beach water park. After graduating from high school in 1987, Sánchez studied acting and speech at the University of New Mexico. She later moved to California and attended El Camino College, where she was diagnosed with dyslexia after a professor identified her learning difficulties. This diagnosis has led her to support the International Dyslexia Association and advocate for more inclusive educational systems. She subsequently studied communications at the University of Southern California. In 1990, she won the international Models World Magazine Cover Girl Competition.

== Career ==
Sánchez began her career as a desk assistant at KCOP-TV in Los Angeles. She also held positions as an anchor and reporter at KTVK-TV in Phoenix before joining the syndicated entertainment show Extra as a reporter. From there, Sánchez moved to Fox Sports Net, where she earned an Emmy nomination as anchor and correspondent for the sports magazine Going Deep, served as an anchor for Fox Sports News Primetime, and later was an entertainment reporter for FSN's Best Damn Sports Show Period.

In 1999, Sánchez returned to KCOP-TV to anchor UPN News 13, where her team won an Emmy Award. In 1999. Sánchez was co-host on KTTV Fox 11's Good Day LA and anchor on the Fox 11 News at Ten. She was the runner-up in the nationwide hosting competition during season 2 of The View in February 2000. The position was ultimately given to Lisa Ling. In 2005, Sánchez became the original host of FOX's popular dancing competition So You Think You Can Dance. Sánchez left the show after only one season to have her second child and was replaced by Cat Deeley. In 2009, Sánchez returned to Extra as weekend anchor and special correspondent. Sánchez continues to occasionally work on Good Day LA, Extra and other TV shows.

Sánchez was featured in People magazine's "50 Most Beautiful" issue in 2010 and Us Weekly's "Hot Bodies" issue. In 2016, after having learned to fly at age 40 and getting her pilot's license, she founded Black Ops Aviation. Sánchez focuses on film and television projects which allow her to use her skills as a licensed pilot. In 2024, she received the Elling Halvorson Vertical Flight Hall of Fame Award at the Annual Living Legends of Aviation Awards for her expertise as a helicopter pilot and aviation businesswoman.

In 2024, Sánchez released her first children's book, The Fly Who Flew to Space, a story about a fly named Flynn who doesn't do well in school but is curious about life and accidentally gets stuck in the cockpit of a rocket that heads into space. The story is inspired by Sánchez's life and her struggles with dyslexia. It debuted on the New York Times Bestseller list on September 29, 2024. On February 27, 2025, it was announced that Sánchez would be one of the passengers for Blue Origin's eleventh flight to space under the New Shepard program, along with Katy Perry, Aisha Bowe, Amanda Nguyen, Kerianne Flynn and fellow journalist Gayle King. Blue Origin NS-31's sub-orbital mission took place on April 14, 2025, making Sánchez and King the first female journalists to fly to space.

== Philanthropy ==
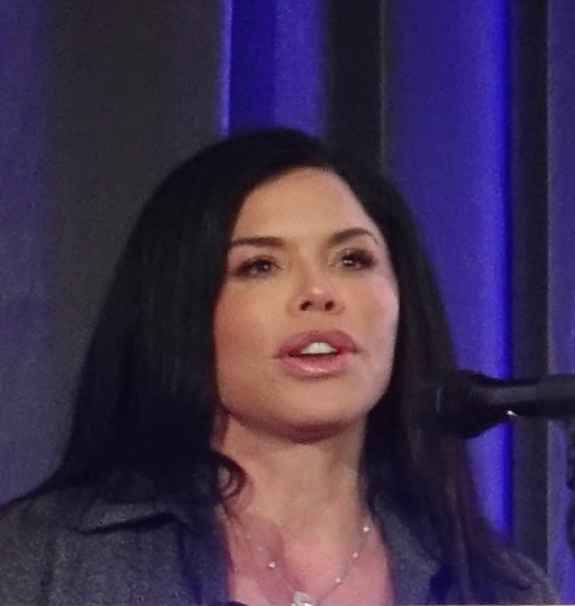
Lauren Sánchez speaking at the 2023 Philanthropy Innovation Summit

Sánchez is the vice-chairperson of Bezos Earth Fund, and helped promote their Greening America's Cities initiative, a seven-year $400 million commitment to help create and enhance greenspaces in underserved communities. In March 2024, she pledged to donate $60 million to create centers that would focus on biomanufacturing and climate change. In October 2024, Sánchez and Bezos pledged $60 million to the National Fish and Wildlife Foundation to enable the restoration and improved management of 1,600,000 acres (2,500 square miles) of land across more than a dozen states. Sánchez was also honored by American nonprofit environmental organization Conservation International with its Global Visionary Award for her commitment to supporting pressing nature issues.

Sánchez is part of the Bezos Courage and Civility Award which as of 2024 has granted $400 million to philanthropists. She also works with the Bezos Day One Fund, which helps homeless families with housing and free preschool education. Sánchez makes trips across the United States–Mexico border with This is About Humanity, an organization dedicated to providing support for separated and reunified families at the border. She was honored by the organization at their annual fundraising event in 2023.

== Personal life ==
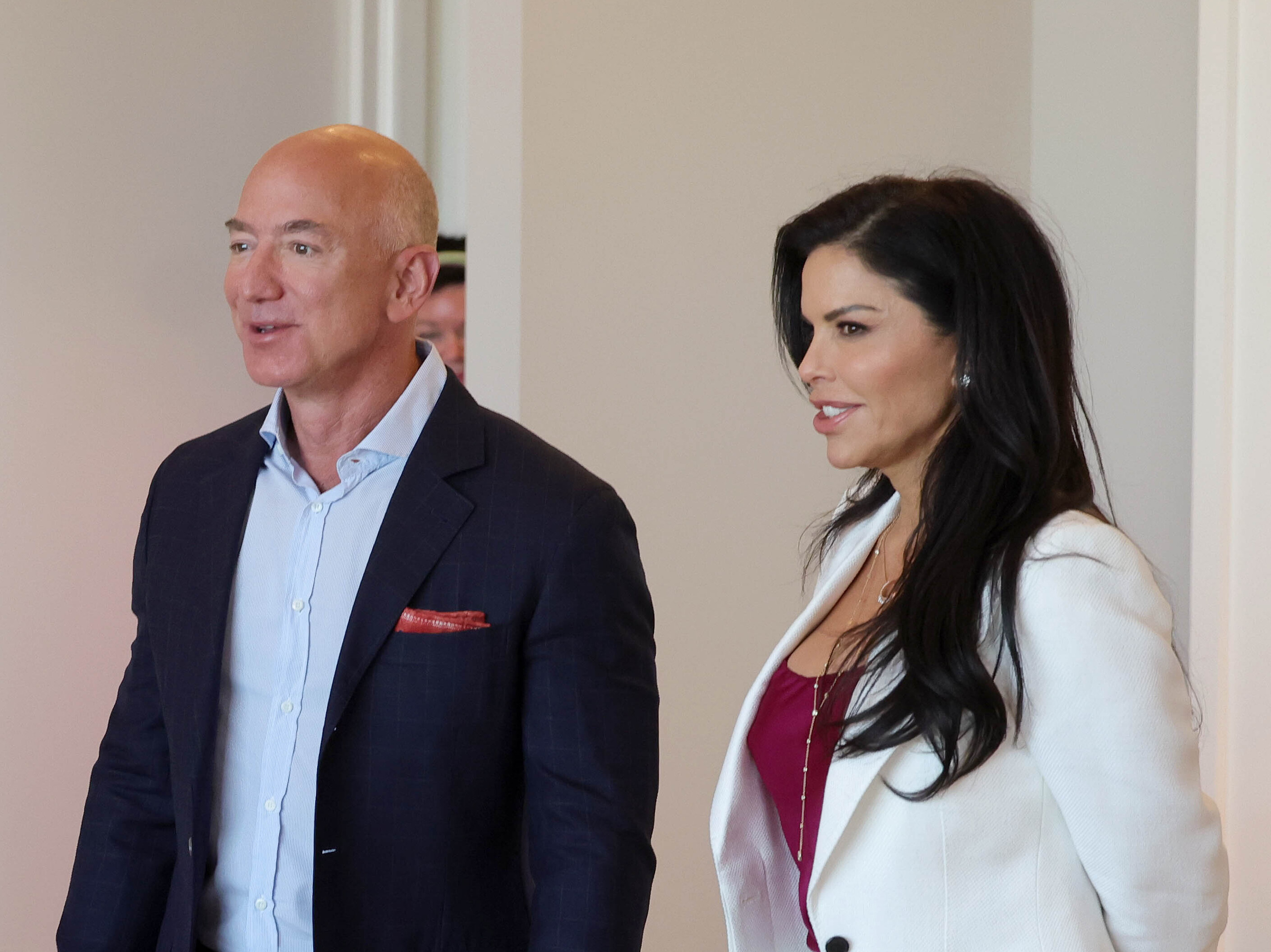
Sánchez and Jeff Bezos in September 2021

Sánchez's first son was born in February 2001. His father is former National Football League player Tony Gonzalez. In August 2005, she married Patrick Whitesell, a Hollywood agent and founding partner of Endeavor Talent Agency. Their son was born in 2006, and their daughter was born in 2008.

In 2018, Sánchez had an affair with businessman and Amazon founder Jeff Bezos, while each was married. In January 2019, Bezos and his wife, MacKenzie Scott, released a joint statement that they would seek a divorce, after 25 years of marriage. In February 2019, Bezos alleged that National Enquirer publisher American Media, Inc. had attempted blackmail and extortion in connection with Bezos' relationship with Sánchez.

In April 2019, Bezos' and Scott's divorce was finalized, and in October 2019, Sánchez's and Whitesell's divorce was finalized. In 2020, the media started referring to Sánchez as Bezos' girlfriend.

The couple became engaged in May 2023 and married in Venice on June 27, 2025. She is now known as Lauren Sánchez Bezos.

== Filmography ==
Sánchez has made cameo appearances in films and television series, including in the following:

=== Film ===
List of film credits
Year	Title	Role	Notes
1999	Fight Club	Channel 4 Reporter	Credited as W. Lauren Sanchez
2003	Hollywood Homicide	Chopper Newscaster	
2004	The Day After Tomorrow	International Newscaster	
2004	Cellular	News Anchor No. 2	
2005	Fantastic Four	KCOP / KTTV reporter	
2005	The Longest Yard	Herself	
2006	Akeelah and the Bee	Reporter	
2006	Zoom	Reporter	
2007	Fantastic Four: Rise of the Silver Surfer	Fox News reporter	
2008	College Road Trip	News anchor	
2008	Killer Movie	Margo Moorhead	
2010	The Big Picture	Layla	
2011	We Bought a Zoo	TV Anchor	
2012	Celeste and Jesse Forever	News reporter	
2013	White House Down	Reporter	
2015	Ted 2	Boston Newscaster	
2017	Girlfriend's Day	Newscaster	
2024	The Trainer	Herself	

=== Television ===
List of television credits
Year	Title	Role	Notes
1997	Babylon 5	Newsanchor	Episode: "Epiphanies"
2001	Girlfriends	Anchorwoman	Episode: "A Full Court Conspiracy"
2002	The Agency	Newsanchor	Episode: "Finale"
2005	Eve	Aramanda De La Cruz	Episode: "Brit Better Have My Money"
2008	Dirt	Entertainment Anchor No. 1	Episode: "Dirty, Slutty Whores"
2008	Gotham Tonight	Lydia Filangeri	3 episodes; web series that served as a prequel to The Dark Knight
2010	NCIS	NCIS Agent Sanchez	Episode: "Double Identity"
2010	Days of Our Lives	Cece Chavez	2 episodes
2014	Rake	News Anchor No. 1	Episode: "Serial Killer"
