= Human Research Program =

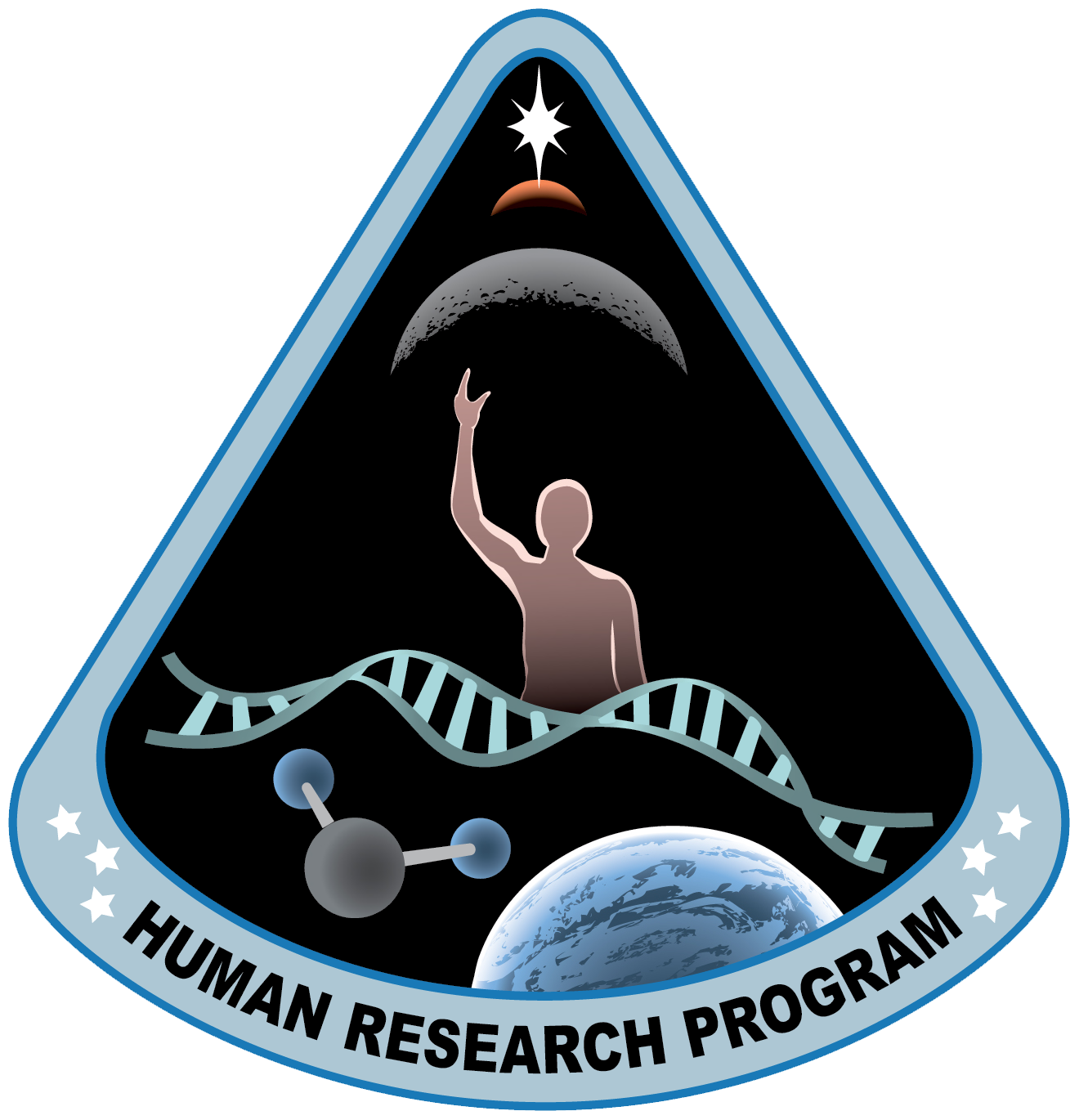
Human Research Program logo

The Human Research Program (HRP) is a NASA program established in October of 2005. The HRP is located in the Johnson Space Center. Its main focuses are research and development, specifically for employees of NASA.

== Goals ==
The stated goals of the HRP are to provide knowledge and technology in order to mitigate risks to human health and performance. The Human Research Program also aims to educate the public on the challenges of human space flight.

== Crew Health and Performance Exploration Analog missions ==
To evaluate human health and performance factors ahead of future Mars missions, the program conducts Crew Health and Performance Exploration Analog (CHAPEA) missions inside a habitat at the Johnson Space Center. The 1,700 sq ft (160 m^{2}) habitat was 3-D printed from lavacrete.

=== CHAPEA mission 1 ===
- Began June 25, 2023
- Ended July 6, 2024
- Crew: Anca Selariu, Ross Brockwell, Kelly Haston, Nathan Jones

=== CHAPEA mission 2 ===
- Began October 19, 2025
- Crew: Ross Elder, Ellen Ellis, Matthew Montgomery, and James Spicer

== Human Research Roadmap ==
The Human Research Roadmap (HRR) is a web-based tool that is used to communicate the content of the Integrated Research Plan (IRP). The IRP is utilized to identify the approach and research activities planned to address risks to human health and performance in space which are assigned to specific elements within the program.

This tool is designed to help users search for items such as gaps associated with risks, the tasks associated with a given gap, the cross-integration of a task across multiple gaps or risks, and deliverables associated with a gap or risk.

=== Evidence ===
Reviews of the accumulated evidence from medical records, space flight operations, and research findings are compiled into evidence reports. This evidence provides the basis for identifying the highest risk to humans in space exploration, which comprises the risk portfolio within the HRP. It also provides the basis for identifying gaps and tasks in the research plan.

=== Risks ===
The program identifies risks related to the physiological effects of radiation, weightlessness, terrestrial environments as well as unique challenges in medical support, human factors, and behavioral health support. Risks are identified in the Program Requirements Document (PRD) and assigned to an element within HRP to quantify, mitigate, or monitor.

=== Gaps ===
For each risk, the HRP attempts to identify gaps in knowledge about the risk and the ability to mitigate the risk. The degree of uncertainty in understanding the likelihood, consequence, and/or time frame of a particular risk are the major factors that drive the gaps. Gaps in knowledge or risk mitigation often appear in multiple risks, and many of the specific research tasks address multiple gaps.

=== Tasks ===
Tasks partially or completely close a gap by better defining a risk or developing mitigation strategies to reduce the risk to an acceptable level. In some cases, a task can address multiple gaps across multiple risks.

=== Deliverables ===
Each task culminates in a deliverable or otherwise agreed-upon end-product such as recommended standards, flight rules, processes, countermeasures, and new technologies.
