= Amanda Nguyen =

American activist (born 1991)

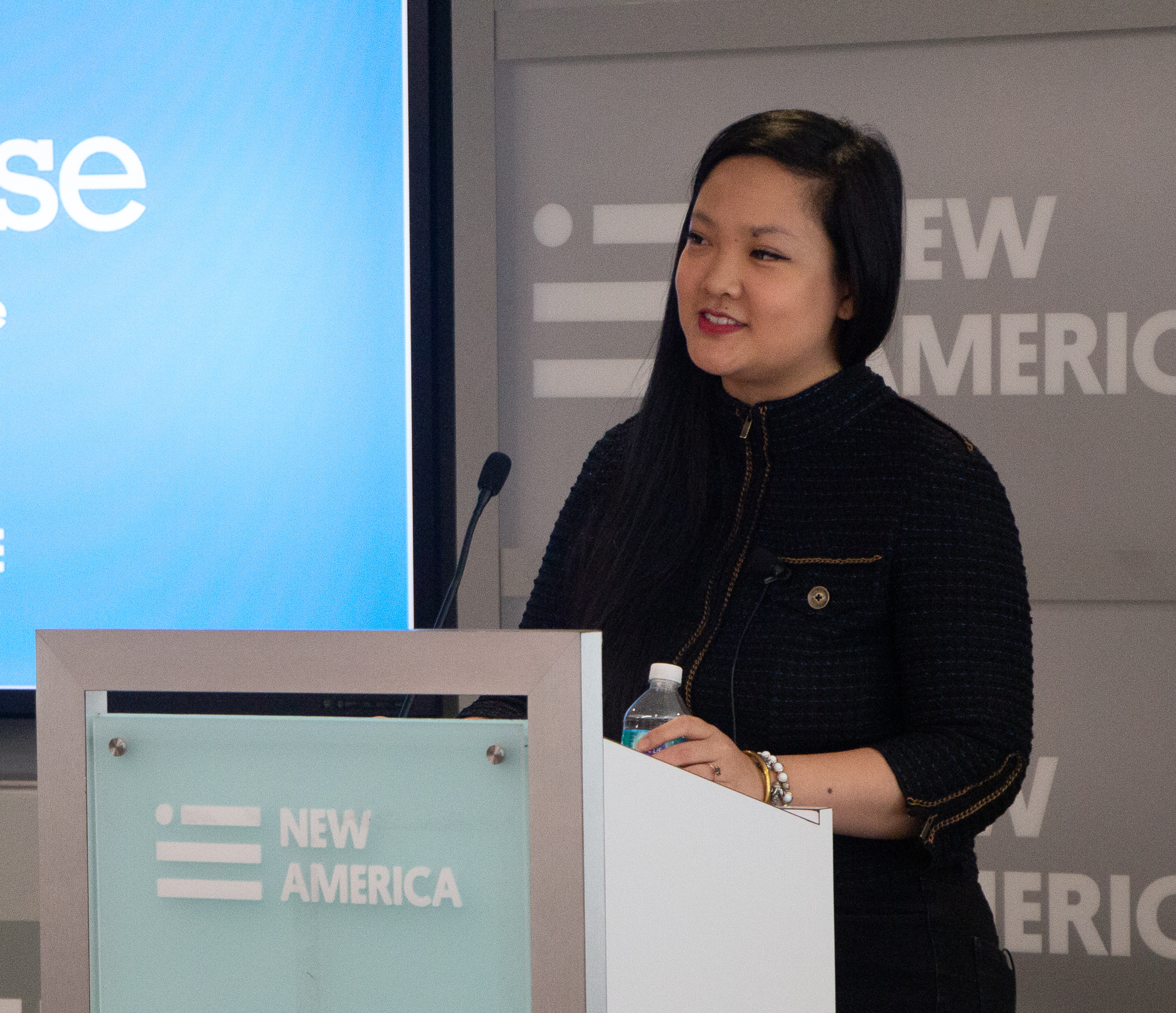
- Nguyen in 2019
- Born: October 10, 1991 (age 34); California, U.S.
- Education: Harvard University (BA)
- Occupations: Founder and CEO of Rise
- Known for: Sexual Assault Survivors' Rights Act; Space tourism
- Awards: Time Woman of the Year (2022); Heinz Award (2019)

Amanda Ngọc Nguyễn (born Oct 1991) is a Vietnamese-American social entrepreneur, civil rights activist, and commercial astronaut. In 2014 she founded Rise, a non-governmental civil rights organization that works to implement a sexual assault survivors' bill of rights. She drafted the Sexual Assault Survivors' Rights Act, a bill that passed unanimously through the United States Congress. She has also been credited with kickstarting the movement to stop violence against Asian Americans, after her video calling for media coverage went viral in February 2021.

In recognition of her work, Nguyen was nominated for the 2019 Nobel Peace Prize and was named one of the 2022 Time Women of the Year. She has received several awards, and was credited as a Top 100 Global Thinker by Foreign Policy. Her memoir, Saving Five, was published in March 2025 and debuted on The New York Times Best Seller list.

Nguyen flew aboard Blue Origin's 11th spaceflight under the New Shepard program. The Blue Origin NS-31 sub-orbital spaceflight took place on April 14, 2025, making Nguyen the first woman of Vietnamese heritage to fly into space. During the flight, Nguyen conducted scientific experiments, including one related to wound dressing in microgravity.

== Early life and education ==
Amanda Ngọc Nguyễn was born in 1991, in California. She is the daughter of Vietnamese boat people who migrated to the United States after the Vietnam War.

She graduated from Centennial High School of Corona, California in 2009 and earned a Bachelor of Arts at Harvard University in 2013.

== Career ==
Nguyen interned at NASA in 2011 and 2013. She conducted research on exoplanets at the Harvard–Smithsonian Center for Astrophysics.

After serving as the Deputy White House Liaison for the U.S. Department of State, Nguyen left to work full-time at advocacy organisation Rise in 2016, which she co-founded. Encouraged by her mentors during her time at NASA, Nguyen aspired to become an astronaut.

In 2021 she became a scientist astronaut candidate at the International Institute for Astronautical Sciences, researching women's health and menstruation.

In 2024, Blue Origin announced that Nguyen would become the first Vietnamese American woman to fly to space on an upcoming New Shepard mission. On February 27, 2025, it was announced that Nguyen would fly aboard Blue Origin's 11th spaceflight under the New Shepard program. The Blue Origin NS-31 sub-orbital spaceflight took place on April 14, 2025,

Nguyễn said that she was doing it because NASA had historically barred women from becoming astronauts, frequently citing menstruation as the reason. During the flight, Nguyen conducted scientific experiments, including one related to wound dressing in microgravity. The Vietnam National Space Center provided 169 lotus seeds that travelled with Nguyen, to be used to study the effects of space conditions on plant growth. Nguyen also tested some materials for next-gen spacesuits and a wearable ultrasound patch, both engineered by researchers at MIT, where she used to be a Media Lab Director's Fellow.

== Advocacy ==
In 2013, Nguyen was raped while a student at Harvard University. Nguyen chose not to press charges immediately since she did not feel she had the necessary time and resources to participate in a trial that could potentially last for years. After police officers informed her there was a 15-year statute of limitations for rape in Massachusetts, she decided she would press charges at a later date when she was ready. She had a rape kit performed and discovered that, if she did not report the crime to law enforcement, her rape kit would be destroyed after six months if an extension request was not filed. She was also not given official instructions on how to file for an extension. Nguyen considered this system to be broken, partially because the extension request would be an unnecessary reminder of a traumatizing experience. Nguyen met other survivors with similar stories and concluded that the current legal protections were insufficient.

=== Rise ===
In November 2014, Nguyen founded Rise, a nonprofit organisation which is aimed to protect the civil rights of sexual assault and rape survivors. Nguyen headed the organization in her spare time until September 2016. Everyone who works with Rise is a volunteer, and the organization has raised money through GoFundMe. Nguyen explained that the organization was named Rise to "remind us that a small group of thoughtful, committed citizens can rise and change the world".

Nguyen's aim is for Rise to pass a Sexual Assault Survivor Bill of Rights in all 50 U.S. states as well as on the national level. She has also traveled to Japan where a similar bill was presented.

=== Sexual Assault Survivors' Rights Act ===
In July 2015, Nguyen met with US Senator Jeanne Shaheen from New Hampshire to discuss legislation that would protect survivor rights on the federal level. Legislation that Nguyen had helped draft was introduced to Congress in February 2016 by Shaheen. Nguyen collaborated with Change.org and comedy website Funny or Die to draw attention to the legislation and encourage voters to support it. Nguyen launched a Change.org petition that called on Congress to pass the legislation. The Funny or Die video and Change.org petition received support from Judd Apatow and Patricia Arquette on Twitter. As of February 28, 2016, the Change.org petition gained 60,000 of the 75,000 requested signatures. By October 2016, there were more than 100,000 signatures.

The bill passed through the Senate in May and the House of Representatives in September. It passed unanimously in both chambers of Congress, and was signed into law in October 2016 by President Barack Obama. The law protects, among other rights, the right to have the evidence of a rape kit preserved without charge for the duration of the statute of limitations.

On October 12, 2017, California governor Jerry Brown approved a bill titled "Sexual assault victims: rights".

=== Other advocacy ===
Nguyen has been credited with kickstarting the movement to stop violence against Asian Americans, after her video calling for media coverage went viral on February 5, 2021. Nguyen had previously spoken out against racism against Asian Americans in the United States. In July 2018, in a now deleted Instagram post, Nguyen alleged that Neiman Marcus had refused to sell her the dress she wore to announce her Nobel Peace Prize nomination due to her race. She wrote, "When I went to buy it at Neiman Marcus they refused to let me buy it. When I asked why, they said they didn’t take cards like mine. (It’s a MasterCard)." She continued, "Neiman Marcus didn’t think that someone who looks like me could afford a dress like that (...) For so many marginalized members of our community, it does not matter how much money we make or how successful we can be – one can be nominated for a Nobel and still experience this racism, sexism, ageism.”

== Memoir ==
Her memoir, Saving Five, was published in March 2025 and debuted on the New York Times Best Seller list.

== Recognition and honors ==
In 2018, Shepard Fairey, an American activist artist, created a portrait of Nguyen as part of a series for the Amplifier media lab's "We the Future" campaign, a collection of commissioned art pieces that were sent to 20,000 middle and high schools around the United States to teach about various grassroots movements.

In recognition of her work, Nguyen was nominated for the 2019 Nobel Peace Prize by Mimi Walters and Zoe Lofgren, and was named one of the 2022 Time Women of the Year. She has also received the 24th Annual Heinz Award in Public Policy, Time 100 Next, Forbes 30 Under 30, and was credited as a Top 100 Global Thinker by Foreign Policy.

Nguyen is featured in the 2022 anthology We Are Here: 30 Inspiring Asian Americans and Pacific Islanders Who Have Shaped the United States by Naomi Hirahara and published by the Smithsonian Institution and Running Press Kids.

In November 2025, Vogue Singapore featured Nguyen on a digital cover for their Vogue Voices series. This marked the first time a Vietnamese woman had been featured on a solo Vogue cover.

- 2016 – Young Women's Honors Award, Marie Claire
- 2016 – Top 100 Global Thinkers, Foreign Policy
- 2017 – 2017 Women's March Honored Guest and Speaker
- 2017 – Forbes 30 Under 30, Forbes
- 2017 – 40 Women to Watch, The Tempest
- 2018 – The Frederick Douglass 200 List
- 2019 – Nelson Mandela Changemaker Award
- 2019 – 24th Annual Heinz Awards in Public Policy
- 2019 – Vanity Fair Global Goals, Vanity Fair
- 2019 – Time 100 Next, Time
- 2020 – SXSW Community Service Award
- 2021 – She was recognized as one of the BBC's 100 women
- 2022 – Time Women of the Year, Time
- 2023 – A100 Honoree, Goldhouse
- 2025 – Honorary Fulbright Scholar, Fulbright University Vietnam
- 2025 – Tatler Impact Awards: Humanity Award, Tatler Asia
