= House of Slay =

Collective fighting racial discrimination

- First issue of House of Slay
- Formation: 2020–2021
- Headquarters: New York City
- Key people: Prabal Gurung; Laura Kim; Tina Leung; Phillip Lim; Ezra J. William
- Website: thehouseofslay.com

The House of Slay is a collective fighting racial discrimination against Asians and advocating inclusivity. It was founded during the COVID-19 pandemic by the Slaysians, a group of five Asian fashion industry insiders in New York, including Prabal Gurung, Laura Kim, Phillip Lim, Tina Leung, and Ezra J. William. In 2021, the group launched the digital superhero comic House of Slay to promote inclusivity for underrepresented groups. It has also worked with the Asian American Pacific Islander community by partnering with the AAPI Victory Fund to mobilize and support voters.

In 2022, the Council of Fashion Designers of America (CFDA) recognized the House of Slay with its Positive Social Influence Award.

== Background ==
Designers Prabal Gurung and Laura Kim first met in 2004, when they worked in the same building at Bill Blass and Oscar de la Renta, respectively. However, the Slaysians did not coalesce as a group until 2018, when the film Crazy Rich Asians was released. After seeing the film at a private screening, Gurung arranged to have the studio host another screening especially for Asians in the fashion industry. According to Gurung, it was the first gathering of its kind in New York City, bringing together Asian fashion designers, creatives, stylists, and editors for a social cause. He told Tatler Asia, "I was really touched by a movie that was about people who looked like us and felt like us and truly represented us—and right after, I realised that there was a serious lack of camaraderie among Asian designers." Following the screening, he hosted a dinner, which snowballed into a series of gatherings centered around home cooking and nights out at Bubble_T, the queer Asian dance party.

According to stylist Tina Leung, on one occasion, designer Phillip Lim invited her to pre-drinks before heading out. When she arrived, bringing socialite Ezra William with her, Laura Kim and Prabal Gurung were already there. The five of them bonded and started meeting regularly, calling themselves the "Slaysians", a moniker coined by music artist Slayrizz.

=== Activism ===
The increase in anti-Asian hate crimes during the pandemic drew the Slaysians closer and inspired them to speak out. Phillip Lim had started speaking out against harassment and scapegoating of Asians, making an appearance on CNN on March 10, 2020, days before a complete lockdown was announced in New York City. Lim went on to help start the Stop Asian Hate AAPI Community Fund on GoFundMe and launched the #NYTougherThanEver initiative with Ruba Abu-Nimah. The Slaysians spread #StopAsianHate in a coordinated campaign on social media and also participated in the Black Lives Matter protests together in New York City.

Deciding to channel their energy and influence toward raising awareness for Asian cultures in a more positive light, the five friends established the House of Slay. According to Lim, it was important to them to convey, "'we're not a trend, we're not a stereotype, we're not your model minority myth'". From "tokenism" in campaigns to constantly being treated as a "trend", they realized their vulnerability to being "disappeared" in the industry, once they fell out of fashion. Lim told Vogue, "One time we're in, next time, it's another community. It really shouldn't be that way; we should all make up the community of fashion. So we thought we should build a house that invites all in—all communities."

== Comic book series ==
The digital comic House of Slay debuted on November 11, 2021, with 37 episodes published through April 25, 2023. The comic is available on Tapas and Webtoon. Created in collaboration with Einhorn's Epic Productions, its mission is to "take on racism, hatred, bullying, and fear of the 'other'". The House of Slay describes itself as "a place for everyone – an inclusive space representing not only the AAPI heritage of its founders, but underrepresented voices from all walks of life".

=== Main characters ===
The series features each of the Slaysians as a comic book superhero who is "dressed to slay". Their respective alter egos are granted superpowers by a phoenix deity. The characters' costumes are non-traditional in the superhero genre, and were designed to reflect their individual personalities and fashion affinities:

- Prabal Gurung is a telepath who can control others' minds. He wears black leather, jewelry from Nepal, and a cape that changes color.
- Phillip Lim is bullet-proof and has the ability to form a protective shield, inspired by the canopy of a forest. He wears a green-and-gold monastic robe, and dragon armor inspired by his tattoo in real life.
- Laura Kim can teleport herself and others. She wears a translucent trench coat.
- Tina Leung is telekinetic. She wears a gold bodysuit, a cape made of chain mail, and gold high heels with diamond crystals.
- Ezra J. Williams controls the weather. He wears blue, inspired by Sailor Moon and Storm.

The House of Slay superheroes' costumes were co-created by comic artist Kevin Wada, who also designed the cover art.

=== Plot ===
Once they have acquired their powers, which are stronger when they work together, five friends from the New York fashion world are ready to fight Max Huxley, a villain who draws his power from everyday acts of hatred and discrimination. The fashion superheroes vow to use their powers to spread love and hope for all humankind.

New heroes and villains are introduced in Season 2, which challenges the superheroes with more complex situations.

== Other initiatives ==
In addition to launching the comic book, the House of Slay was involved in several other initiatives to support the Asian American Pacific Islander community, including a voter mobilization program with the AAPI Victory Fund. The House of Slay created a merchandise collection, including t-shirts, sweaters, and bags, to benefit the fund.

In 2022, the House of Slay partnered with the Brooklyn Nets NBA basketball team on several projects, including co-hosting the first-ever Brooklyn Nets AAPI Heritage Game and co-sponsoring a mural at John J. Pershing Intermediate School 220 in Sunset Park with the Thrive Collective. The concept for the mural was "Be Your Own Superhero".

To celebrate AAPI Heritage Month, the House of Slay hosted a pop-up market on the Lower East Side, at The Market Line at Essex Crossing, with sponsorship from Diageo. The event featured food, fashion, music, and art created by artists and vendors from the Asian diaspora.

== Award ==
In November 2022, the Council of Fashion Designers of America awarded the House of Slay – Gurung, Kim, Leung, Lim, and William – the Positive Social Influence Award.

At the CFDA Awards, Prabal Gurung wore a vintage three-piece suit by YSL with jewelry from Tasaki, where he is creative director. Tina Leung wore a metallic gold dress with a winding snake, inspired by the gold bodysuit worn by her superhero alter ego.
