= Rich Kids of Instagram =

Rich Kids of Instagram may refer to:

- Rich Kids of Instagram (documentary), a 2015 British television programme
- Rich Kids of Instagram (TV series), a 2016 British reality TV series
- Rich Kids of Instagram: A Novel, a book published in 2014
- Rich Kids of the Internet or RKOI, a social media channel originally known as Rich Kids of Instagram

== See also ==
- Rich Kids of Beverly Hills
