= Tina Leung (stylist) =

International stylist and fashion content creator (born 1982)

- 梁伊妮
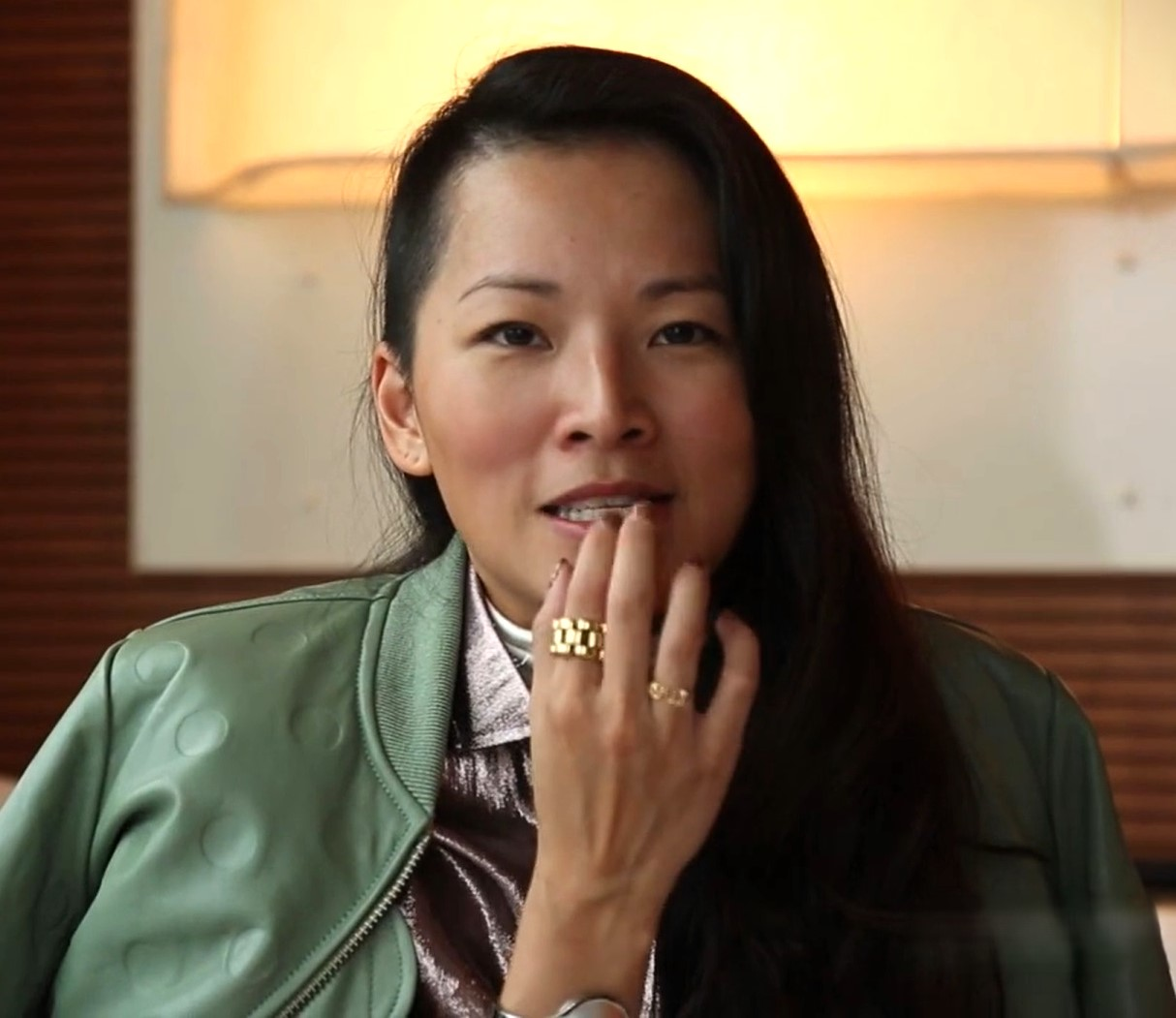
- Leung in 2013
- Born: March 27, 1982 (age 44); Hong Kong
- Education: University of Bristol; Fashion Institute of Technology
- Occupations: Stylist; Fashion content creator
- Organization: House of Slay
- Television: Bling Empire: New York
- Website: instagram.com/tinaleung/

Tina Leung
- Chinese: 梁伊妮
Transcriptions
Standard Mandarin
- Hanyu Pinyin: Liáng Yīnī
Yue: Cantonese
- Yale Romanization: Lèuhng Yī-nèih
- Jyutping: Loeng^{4} Ji^{1}-nei^{4}

Tina Leung (Chinese: 梁伊妮; born March 27, 1982) is a Hong Kong-born fashion stylist and content creator based in the United States. She starred in Bling Empire: New York. Leung has collaborated with the fashion houses Valentino, Gucci, and Chanel, and is the editor of the book Bulgari Magnifica: The Power Women Hold, a collaboration with Bulgari. She started her career in the publishing industry at Prestige Hong Kong magazine.

Leung has an Instagram account with half a million followers and previously had a blog called Tina Loves, which she started in 2010. She is frequently photographed by street fashion photographers. Known for her candy-colored hair, her outfits have been described as "bold" and "eclectic".

A founding member of the House of Slay, a collective of influential Asian fashion industry insiders, Leung was a co-recipient of the Council of Fashion Designers of America Positive Social Impact Award in 2022. She has been in the BoF 500, a live index of the most influential people in the global fashion industry, since 2014. In 2022, she was named one of the Top 10 Breakout Style Stars by the Daily Front Row.

== Early life and education ==
Leung was born in Hong Kong in 1982. She moved to California at the age of two. Returning to Hong Kong at age 11, she attended Chinese International School (CIS).

Originally intending to pursue a career in performing arts, she attended Bates College in Maine. She then transferred to University of Bristol in the United Kingdom, graduating in 2004. She later took a one-year course at the Fashion Institute of Technology in New York, where she gained experience as an assistant stylist and worked with several photographers to build her portfolio.

== Career ==
In 2005, Leung moved back to Hong Kong after being offered a job at what would later become Prestige magazine. She had been introduced to publisher and creative director Gordon Lam by her hairstylist when she went to the salon for a haircut. At Prestige, she covered the fashion and accessories markets, and interviewed industry figures including a watchmaker at Hermès and model Kendal Jenner.

While living in Hong Kong, Leung styled for major publications in the region including Tatler, Ming Pao, and South China Morning Post, as well as Prestige. She did styling at runway shows and worked with celebrity clients Yunjin Kim, Karen Mok, and James Ferragamo. Her collaborations in Hong Kong included brands Valentino, Loewe, and Georg Jensen.

In 2010, Leung launched her blog, Tina Loves. Initially intended as personal blog for friends and family, the site gained a following over time. In 2012, she received her first invitation to Paris Fashion Week from Dior. She subsequently became a fashion week regular in Milan, London, Paris, and New York, and published snaps chronicling her outfits and experiences. She then became an Instagram influencer; by 2023, she had over half a million followers.

For a period, Leung split her time between Hong Kong and New York, eventually moving to New York City in 2017. In New York, she established a friendship with designer Laura Kim, co-creative director at Oscar de la Renta.

=== House of Slay ===
During the COVID-19 pandemic, Leung and Kim, designers Phillip Lim and Prabal Gurung, and socialite Ezra J. William, established the House of Slay, a collective combating racial discrimination against Asian Pacific Americans. In November 2021, they released the House of Slay, a digital comic featuring each of the five "Slaysians" as a superhero with superpowers. Leung's character in the series is telekinetic.

In November 2022, Leung dressed as her superhero alter ego when the House of Slay members accepted the Positive Social Influence Award from the Council of Fashion Designers of America. For the awards, she wore a metallic gold dress with a high hemline, decorated with a winding snake; her hair was aqua blue and styled like Cindy Crawford.

=== Bling Empire: New York ===
In 2023, Leung appeared on Netflix as one of the main cast members of Bling Empire: New York. According to Cosmopolitan, viewers generally regarded Leung as the "best and sweetest person on the show". Tatler Asia suggested that it was her authenticity and relatability that made her popular among Bling Empire fans, as she shared vulnerable moments from insomnia to heartbreak when she arrived late to the Chanel haute couture fashion show during Paris Fashion Week. On the series, she discusses the "lonely and tiring" side of working as a self-made fashion influencer, and opens up about past relationships and why she cherishes her current friendships.
