= John J. Pershing Middle School =

John J. Pershing Middle School may refer to:

- Pershing Middle School (Houston)
- Pershing Middle School (San Diego)
- John J. Pershing Intermediate School 220
