= Instagram (disambiguation) =

Instagram is a photo and video sharing social network service.

Instagram may also refer to:

- "Instagram" (Dean song), 2017
- "Instagram" (2019 song), 2019

== See also ==
- Insta (disambiguation)
- Rich Kids of Instagram (disambiguation)
