= Park Avenue Peerage =

Park Avenue Peerage was a 2007 blog about Manhattan socialites. It was run anonymously and was the primary competitor to another anonymous blog called Socialite Rank. After the blogger, an 18-year-old college student from Illinois, revealed her identity, she was offered an internship at New York Magazine.

The context surrounding the blog was documented in the 2023 film Queenmaker: The Making of an It Girl, directed by Zackary Drucker. While she appears in the film during different stages of her transition, the author of Park Avenue Peerage is known as Morgan Olivia Rose and is presently a woman.
