= Socialite Rank =

Blog about New York socialites (2006–2007)

- Website type: Gossip blog
- Founded: April 24, 2006
- Dissolved: April 26, 2007
- Founders: Valentine Uhovski; Olga Rei

Socialite Rank was an anonymously run blog focusing on young female socialites on the Upper East Side of Manhattan in New York City. It launched on April 24, 2006, and was taken down one year later. Every two weeks, the website released a "Social Elite Power Ranking", rating what it deemed as the top 20 women on the basis of their personal style, press coverage, public appearances, and the "hot factor".

The site was "snarky" in tone, warning, "Next time you think about skipping that certain gala, wearing that unknown designer, dating some weird band member, beware. We're watching. And your ranking is on the line!" In an article for New York magazine, journalist Isaiah Wilner described the site as "eerie" due to its anonymity, "like the voice of a Bitch God bellowing from the heavens". Commenters also remained anonymous. The identity of who was behind the blog became the subject of intense speculation, with many wrongly suspecting it was former Vogue editor Derek Blasberg, who had been working as a freelancer.

Socialite Rank, which has drawn comparisons to the fictional "gossip girl" in the television series Gossip Girl, appeared after the first Gossip Girl novel was published in 2002, but before the TV series was first broadcast in September 2007. According to journalist Matthew Schneier, Socialite Rank was part of an early 21st-century shift toward covering "it" girls online, as Internet-savvy socialites started competing for the top slot. Taylor Lorenz of The Washington Post notes that "Manhattan heiresses were suddenly thrust in front of a global audience on the Internet" as blogs llike Gawker and Socialite Rank "tirelessly documented [their] escapades", weaving "often vicious" storylines pitting them against each other and manufacturing drama.

One of the central "rivalries" covered by Socialite Rank pitted Olivia Palermo, a graduate of The New School from Connecticut, against Tinsley Mortimer, a debutante from Virginia who had married into New York society. After the blog published a fake apology letter it claimed had been written by Palermo, her father hired a lawyer, who filed a complaint with the Manhattan district attorney's office on her behalf.

On April 26, 2007, Socialite Rank announced that it was shutting down, denying that it was due to "lawsuits, complaints, or threats". The site disappeared on April 29, 2007. Two days later, Valentine Uhovski and Olga Rei, said that they were the "masterminds behind Socialite Rank". After the blog folded, its primary competitor, Park Avenue Peerage, acquired thousands of new readers.

== Notable socialites ==
Regularly featured women on Socialite Rank included:

- Fabiola Beracasa
- Amanda Hearst
- Lydia Hearst
- Margherita Missoni
- Tinsley Mortimer
- Olivia Palermo
- Rachel Roy
- Ivanka Trump

== See also ==
- Rich Kids of the Internet
