= Rich Kids of the Internet =

Social media channel and brand

Rich Kids Of The Internet
- Formerly: Rich Kids of Instagram
- Founded: 2012
- Founder: James Ison
- Website: instagram.com/rkoi/

Rich Kids of the Internet, also known as RKOI, is a social media channel and brand. Originally called Rich Kids of Instagram, it started as a hashtag in 2012 which subsequently became a popular Tumblr photo blog; it started its own Instagram channel in 2014. RKOI curates images of ultra-wealthy young people flaunting their luxury lifestyles. As of 2020, they were paying $2,000 to be featured.

== History ==
The site's early motto was, "They have more money than you and this is what they do." The first post went viral with a picture of Michael Dell's teenage son enjoying a buffet on the family jet on the way to Fiji, taken by his sister. The identity of who was behind Rich Kids of Instagram remained secret for eight years, leading to comparisons with the television series Gossip Girl. While many of the young people featured appeared eager to show off their wealth, there were reports that "prominent families" had offered money to have their children's photos taken down from RKOI.

British entrepreneur James Ison was revealed as the founder in 2020. He had started posting as an economics student at Oxford Brookes University, and was soon contacted by two New Yorkers who became his partners. RKOI officially changed its name to Rich Kids of the Internet after receiving a legal letter from Facebook, which acquired Instagram.

In 2018, a Business Insider article featuring "50 of the most outlandish photos from the feed" included snaps of taking a helicopter for a "walkabout" on an Icelandic glacier; Bombardier jets; "private island yacht days"; a drone shot of a superyacht; a gold Bentley; a Ferrari 458 Spider; using a Lamborghini to transport a Christmas tree; exclusive use of the spa at the W Miami Hotel; camping in a safari tent at Coachella festival; and showing off fashion and accessories such as Rolexes, Cartier bracelets, Hermès shoe boxes, Louis Vuitton bags, and a white leather skirt suit from Prada.

== Influencers ==
Influencers regularly featured on RKOI included Tiffany Trump, daughter of Donald Trump; Christian Combs, son of Sean "Diddy" Combs; EJ Johnson, son of basketball star Magic Johnson; hotel heir Barron Hilton; influencer Timothy Drake; Indian entrepreneur Manan Shah; and Moldovan Daria Radionova.

== Spin-offs ==
Since its launch, RKOI has spawned many imitators worldwide. It also became the basis for a 2014 novel called Rich Kids of Instagram, co-authored by the creator of RKOI and Maya Sloan.

== See also ==
- Rich Kids of Instagram (documentary)
- Rich Kids of Instagram (TV series)
- Rich Kids of Instagram: A Novel
- Rich Kids of Beverly Hills
- Rich Kids of Tehran
- Socialite Rank
