= Insta (disambiguation) =

Insta is short for Instagram, a social media platform.

Insta may also refer to:

- Insta, cooking equipment once used by Burger King
- Insta, the former name of the band Alison's Halo
- "Insta", song presented at Junior Eurovision Song Contest 2018
- "Insta", a single by Dutch DJ Bizzey

== See also ==
- Instagram (disambiguation)
