= Andrew Warren (entrepreneur) =

American designer

- Born: January 17, 1993 (age 33); New York City, U.S.
- Occupations: Fashion designer, socialite, talent manager, creative director
- Years active: 2013–present

Andrew Warren is an American fashion designer, creative director, talent manager and social media personality based in New York City. He is the co-founder and a former creative director of CollXab. He also founded the women's label Just Drew, and is the creator of the socialite group the "Snap Pack".

== Early life ==
Warren was born on January 17, 1993, to Michael Warren, a real estate investor, and Marcy Warren. His grandfather was David Warren, a well-known clothing manufacturer and designer who founded the Warren Group in the 1960s. The company sold clothes in department stores such as Neiman Marcus and Saks Fifth Avenue. David Warren's name is inscribed on the Garment Worker statue on Seventh Avenue. The family sold the Warren Group in 1998.

== Career ==
After college, Warren launched the fashion label Just Drew. On February 14, 2016, he launched his first collection, titled "It Girl", at Gotham Hall in New York City. His Spring 2017 collection made its debut during New York Fashion Week. According to Warren, his friends' fashion senses serve as his design inspiration.

In 2017, he signed up as a social media influencer with Next Model Management.

With the changes in fashion industry during the COVID-19 pandemic, Warren decided to change careers. In 2021, he co-founded CollXab, an influencer marketing agency. It was focused on helping luxury brands and socialite-influencers build relationships.

== Personal life ==
Warren is reportedly the creator of the "Snap Pack", a circle of socialites that includes Gaia Matisse, the great-great-granddaughter of French artist Henri Matisse; Kyra Kennedy, the great-great niece of John F. Kennedy; Tiffany Trump; EJ Johnson; Peter Brant II; Ezra J. William; Reya Benitez; and actress Bella Thorne.
