= EJNYC =

American reality television series

- Genre: Reality television
- Starring: EJ Johnson; Elisa Johnson; Samaria Smith; Sanaz Panahi; Drew Mac
- Country of origin: United States
- Original language: English
- No. of seasons: 1
- No. of episodes: 6

Production
- Executive producers: Gennifer Gardiner; David Leepson; Brian Zagorski; Eric Kranzler; Doron Ofir
- Production location: New York City
- Running time: 42 minutes
- Production companies: ITV Entertainment; GGTV; Leepson Bounds Entertainment

Original release
- Network: E!
- Release: June 19 – November 3, 2016

Related
- Rich Kids of Beverly Hills

EJNYC is an American reality television series that premiered on the E! cable network, on June 19, 2016. The reality show follows the life of EJ Johnson who moves back to New York City. The show is a spin-off of Rich Kids of Beverly Hills.

== Production ==
The show and cast was announced on June 14, 2016 via E! News.

On November 3, 2016, it was announced that the show will not be returning along with Rich Kids of Beverly Hills.

== Cast ==
The series also features some of his friends and family, referred to as #Glamtourage, including his sister Elisa Johnson, and friends Samaria Smith and Sanaz Panahi.

Lyric McHenry, a cast member, died in August 2018.
