= Charlotte McCurdy =

American designer

- Born: New York City
- Education: Bachelor of Arts in Global Affairs; Master's Degree in Industrial Design
- Alma mater: Yale University; Rhode Island School of Design
- Occupations: Designer, researcher, lecturer
- Website: www.charlottemccurdy.com

Notes
- See

Charlotte McCurdy is an American designer, researcher, and lecturer. She serves as a lecturer at the Hasso Plattner Institute of Design at Stanford University and her work has been exhibited at the Metropolitan Museum of Art, Cooper Hewitt Smithsonian Design Museum, and the Design Museum in London.

== Early life and education ==
McCurdy was born in New York City. She graduated from Yale University in 2013 with a Bachelor of Arts in global affairs. She went on to attend Rhode Island School of Design where she earned a Master's Degree in industrial design. While attending RISD, McCurdy developed an alternative plastic made from algae, which consumes carbon dioxide, as part of her thesis.

== Career ==
After graduation, McCurdy joined the New Museum's art and technology incubator where she continued her research from RISD, working on proof-of-concept designs. In 2021, she took a position at the Rhode Island School of Design as Assistant Professor of Industrial Design, teaching until 2022. She also held positions at Arizona State University which included Assistant Professor in The Design School, and as Senior Global Futures Scientist.

McCurdy's research integrates material science, design, and public engagement to advance carbon-negative technologies. Her work focuses on biogenic textile development from various feedstocks, with active research collaborations.

One of McCurdy's initial projects was that of a translucent raincoat made from marine macro-algae bioplastic. Named "After Ancient Sunlight," it served as both a conceptual design as well as a functional raincoat. The raincoat was exhibited at the Cooper Hewitt, Smithsonian Design Museum triennial "Nature: Collaborations in Design," earning her a Fast Company Innovation Design Award in the experimental category in 2019 and the Linda Tischler Meroial Award.

McCurdy collaborated with fashion designer Phillip Lim in 2021 to create a petroleum-free dress covered in bioplastic sequins. Known as "Algae Sequin Dress," it was exhibited in multiple venues and also featured in Vogue. The dress was exhibited at the Design Museum in London. It was also exhibited at the Metropolitan Museum of Art and made part of its permanent collection in 2024 as part of the museum's Sleeping Beauties: Reawakening Fashion exhibit.
