= Ruba Abu-Nimah =

Creative executive in fashion and beauty

Ruba Abu-Nimah is a Swiss creative executive of Palestinian descent who has worked in the fashion and cosmetic industries. She was the executive creative director for marketing and communications at Tiffany & Co. from March 2021 to February 2023. She previously worked at Revlon, Elle magazine, Bobbi Brown Cosmetics, and Shiseido. She was the first female creative director at Elle magazine in the US.

In 2018, Abu-Nimah collaborated with Nike to design the Air Force 1 Low "Love" shoe embodying equality and acceptance. She has collaborated with Phillip Lim on the New York Tougher Than Ever initiative, as well as a limited-edition sweatshirt to raise funds for Lebanon following the 2020 Beirut explosion.
