= EJ Johnson =

American socialite and TV personality (born 1992)

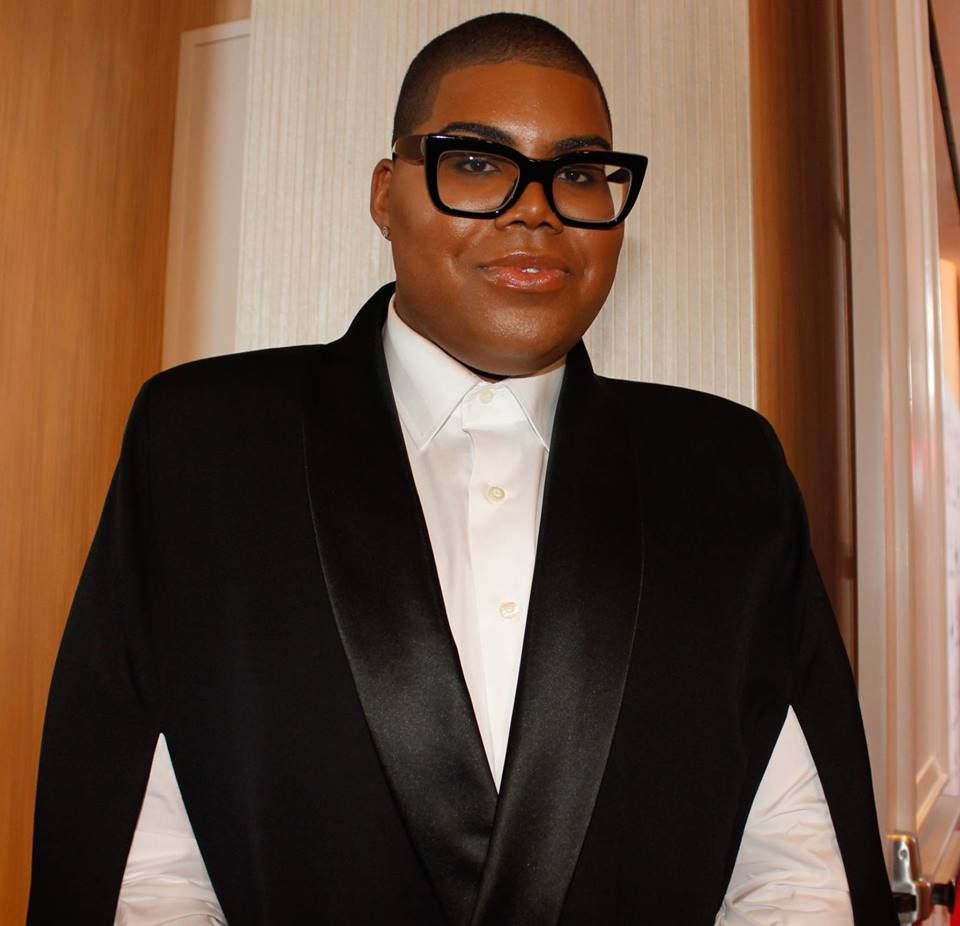
- Johnson in 2014
- Born: Earvin Johnson III; June 4, 1992 (age 34); Beverly Hills, California, U.S.
- Occupations: TV personality, socialite, fashion commentator
- Parent(s): Magic Johnson (father); Earlitha Kelly (mother)

Earvin "EJ" Johnson III (born June 4, 1992) is an American TV personality.

== Early life ==
Earvin Johnson III was born on June 4, 1992, in Beverly Hills, California, to Earvin "Magic" Johnson and Earlitha "Cookie" Johnson (née Kelly). They (Note: Johnson expressed a preference for they/them or she/her pronouns in a 2026 interview. This article uses "they/them" for consistency.) have an older brother, Andre, and a younger sister, Elisa. They were raised in the Pentecostal Christian faith. Johnson attended New York University, studying hospitality with a focus on event planning and design. Johnson is gay; they came out to their family at the age of 17, and came out publicly in 2013, after TMZ published pictures of them holding hands with a male friend. They were supported by their family in their decision to come out publicly. After their decision, Johnson left the West Angeles Church of God in Christ, the church in which they were raised, due to the church's views on homosexuality.

== Career ==
Johnson joined the cast of the E! reality television series Rich Kids of Beverly Hills in 2014 as a recurring cast member on the first season. They became a main cast member for the next three seasons. The show was canceled after four seasons. Johnson then starred in their own spin-off reality series EJNYC, one of the first reality series to profile a young LGBTQ person of color. In 2014, Johnson joined E! News as a news personality and commentator, covering shows for New York Fashion Week as well as having a recurring commentary role on Fashion Police. They also appeared as a guest commentator on Hello Ross in 2014. They were a guest star during season 4 of Real Husbands of Hollywood.

In 2016, Johnson was featured in an It Got Better short documentary produced by L/Studio. In 2017, Johnson moderated a panel at BeautyCon called The Gender Revolution. In 2017 Johnson was a guest host on The Real. In an ESPN interview with Kelley L. Carter, Johnson discussed their television experiences and plans to pursue a career in fashion. On May 12, 2021, it was announced that Johnson would voice the character of Michael Collins in the reboot of The Proud Family: Louder and Prouder, a role played in the original series by Phil LaMarr.

== Personal life ==
In August 2014, Johnson underwent gastric sleeve surgery. Johnson has been noted for their feminine and androgynous fashion style. They revealed that after Caitlyn Jenner's coming out as transgender, they thought about transitioning, but decided against it.

In 2026, Johnson appeared on Carlos King's podcast Reality with The King where they expressed a dislike for being referred to with he/him pronouns, and expressed a desire to be "[called] EJ as much as possible". They are comfortable with either they/them or she/her pronouns.

Johnson is close friends with a group that includes Ezra J. William, Andrew Warren, and Tiffany Trump. The group has been nicknamed the "Rich Kids of Instagram" by the New York Post and the "Snap Pack" by The New York Times and New York Magazine.
