= W Miami Hotel =

Luxury hotel in Miami, Florida

Coordinates: 25.768716°N 80.188727°W

W Miami, formerly Viceroy Miami, is a luxury hotel located in Brickell, Miami, and part of the three-tower mixed-use Icon Brickell complex. The hotel, located at 485 Brickell Avenue, opened in 2009 and contains several restaurants, pools, and lounges.

Qatari hospitality investment firm Al Rayyan Tourism Investment Company (ARTIC), a wholly owned subsidiary of Al Faisal Holding, acquired the Viceroy Miami hotel in June 2016 for $64.5 million. Following the sale, the hotel was rebranded as W Miami.

== Property details ==
The hotel opened in 2009 and was designed by Arquitectonica, a Miami-based international architecture, interior design, and urban planning company. In 2011, the Viceroy was bought by Pebblebrook Hotel Trust for $36.5 million.

W Miami is one of three towers in the Icon Brickell project. The 10-acre (4.0 ha) development is located in a waterfront property in the urban Brickell neighborhood of Greater Downtown Miami. Located in Tower 3, W Miami consists of 148 rooms and suites, 5 commercial units, and 38 condominium hotel units in the 50-story building.

W Miami is best known for its rooftop cocktail lounge on the 50th floor, the signature W Living Room on the hotel's 15th floor, and Florida's largest infinity pool, also located on the rooftop.

== ARTIC acquisition ==
On June 1, 2016, Al Rayyan Tourism Investment Company (ARTIC), a subsidiary of the Qatar-based Al Faisal Holding Company, announced its acquisition of the Viceroy Miami hotel and the subsequent rebranding of the property into a W hotel. The acquisition cost $64.5 million and led to the cessation of Viceroy's management of the hotel as Starwood took over management.

The acquisition of Viceroy Miami was ARTIC's fifth investment in the U.S. and the second in Miami, following the $213 million acquisition of St. Regis Bal Harbour Resort in 2014. ARTIC's U.S. hospitality portfolio includes the Radisson Blu hotel in Chicago, the St. Regis Washington D.C., the Manhattan Times Square in New York, and the St. Regis Bal Harbour Hotel in Miami. The W Miami is the second W hotel in South Florida, in addition to W South Beach and W Fort Lauderdale.

== Awards ==
Before the 2016 ARTIC acquisition, Viceroy Miami was mentioned as one of USA Today's "10 Best" 2015 Best Hotel Rooftop Bars. ARTIC also stated that Viceroy Miami had previously been awarded Conde Nast Traveler's Top Hotels in Florida in 2013 and 2015.
