= Timeline of the COVID-19 pandemic in New York City =

The following is a timeline of the COVID-19 pandemic in New York City.

== Before March 2020 ==
The first, confirmed, case of COVID-19 was in New York State on March 1, 2020, in a 39-year-old health care worker who had returned home to Manhattan from Iran on February 25. Genomic analyses suggest the disease had been introduced to New York as early as January, and that most cases were linked to Europe, rather than Asia.

While the first official case wasn't confirmed until March 1, researchers later estimated that approximately 10,700 New Yorkers had already contracted the virus by that time.

== 2020 ==
=== March 2020 ===
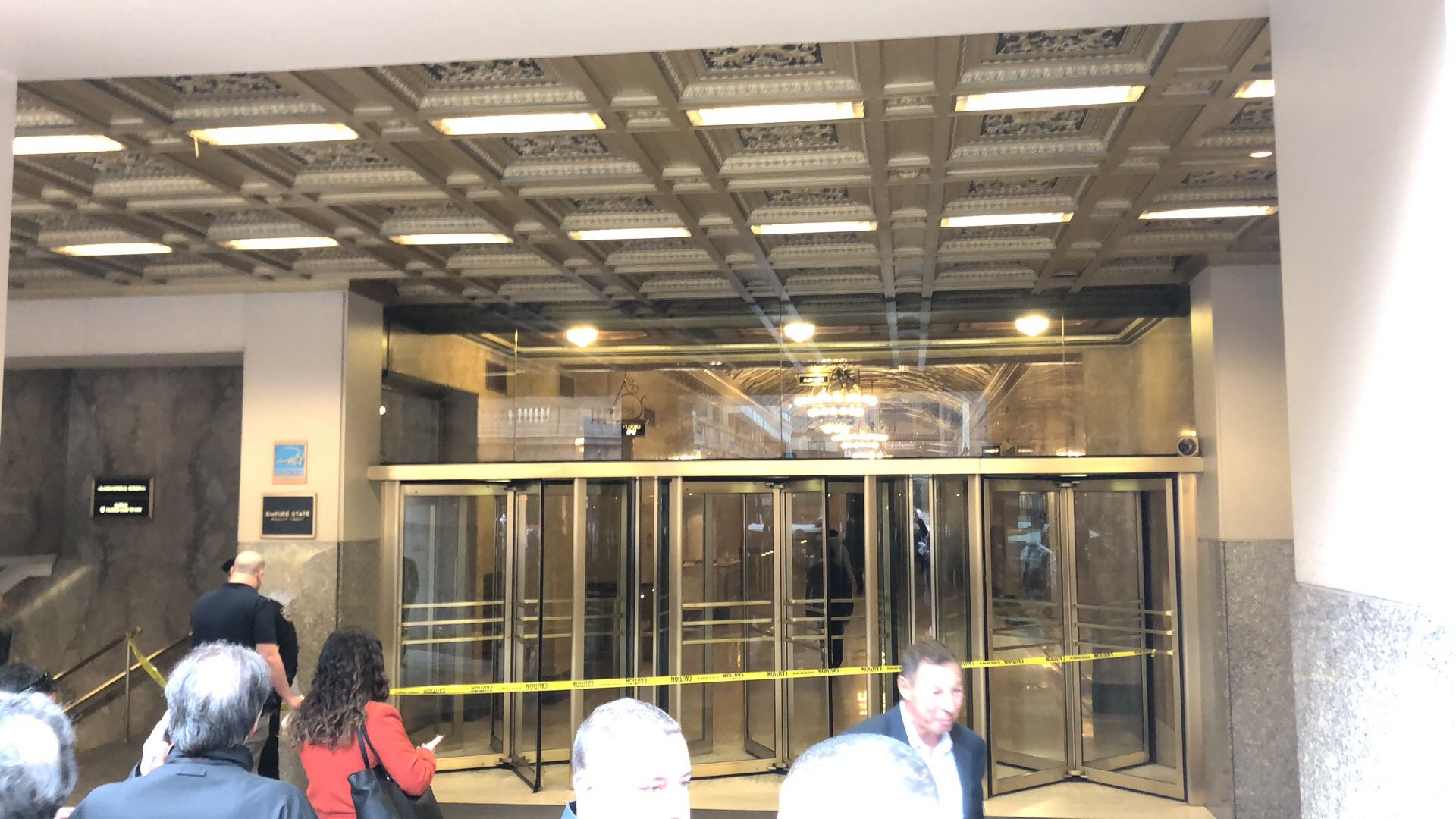
NYPD taping off One Grand Central Place during the early afternoon of March 3, 2020, in response to New York's first confirmed case of COVID-19 person-to-person spread

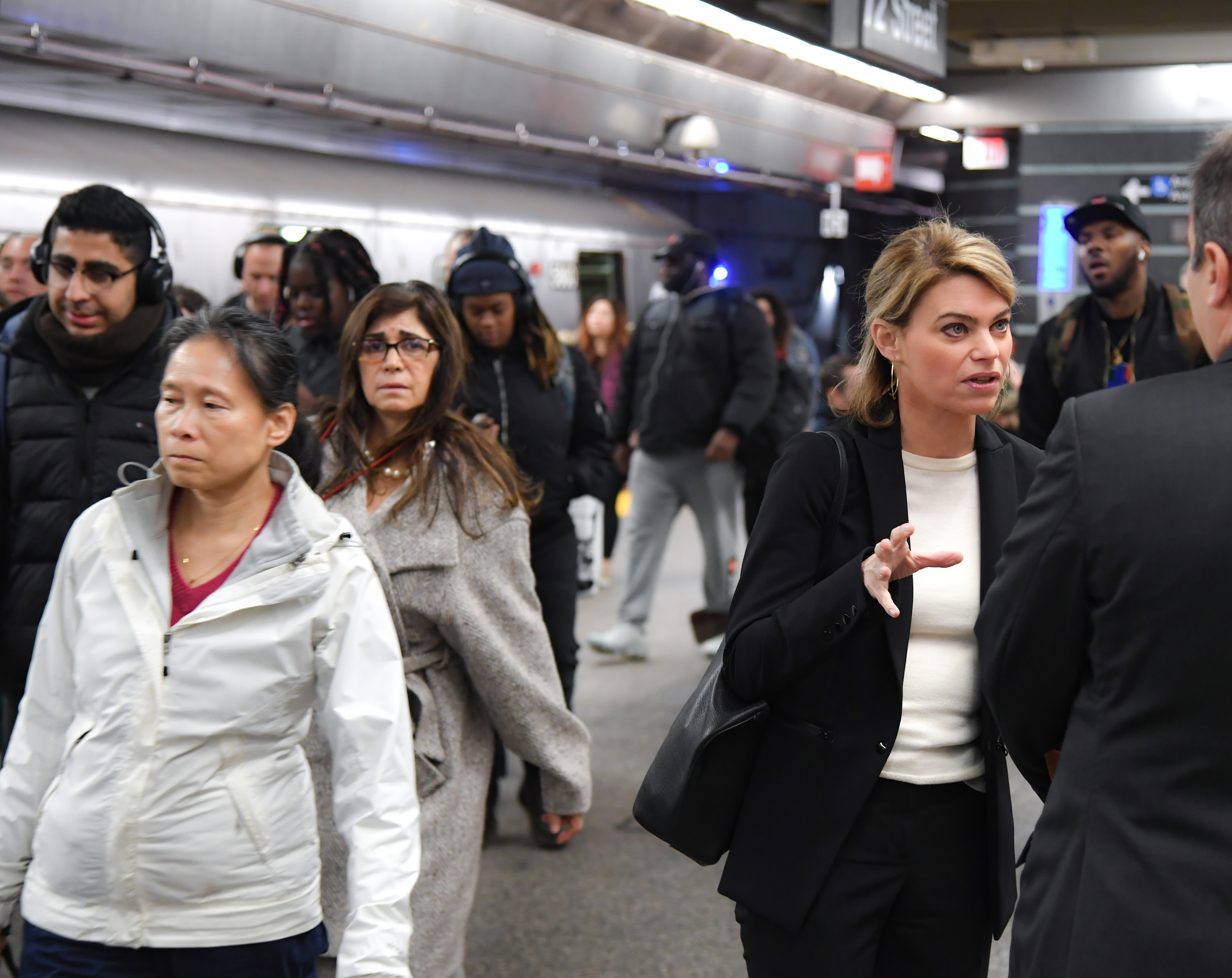
New York City Subway passengers on March 9, when there were 16 confirmed cases of COVID-19 in New York City, with NYC Transit Interim President Sarah Feinberg on the right

On March 3, New York Governor Andrew Cuomo announced that the first recorded case of person-to-person spread in New York State had been confirmed via a New Rochelle man who was working at a law firm within One Grand Central Place in Midtown Manhattan. Six days later, on March 9, Mayor Bill de Blasio announced that there were 16 confirmed cases of COVID-19 in New York City. Cuomo announced a New Rochelle "containment area" on March 10, and the World Health Organization declared a global COVID-19 pandemic on March 11. New York City public schools closed as of March 16, and remote learning began on March 23.

The virus then grew exponentially; by March 25, over 17,800 cases had been confirmed in New York City, with 199 deaths. At the time, the city's infection rate was five times higher than the rest of the country, and its cases were one-third of total confirmed US cases. The reasons for the high infection rate continue to be discussed. On March 27, infection in New York City surpassed 23,000, with 365 deaths. Queens was the worst-affected borough by number of deaths, with over a third of total deaths; the majority of the deceased had underlying health issues. Between March 28 and 29, the number of deaths in New York City tripled from the previous 24-hour period; 222 people died of the virus, bringing the city's fatalities to 672, with 30,765 confirmed cases.

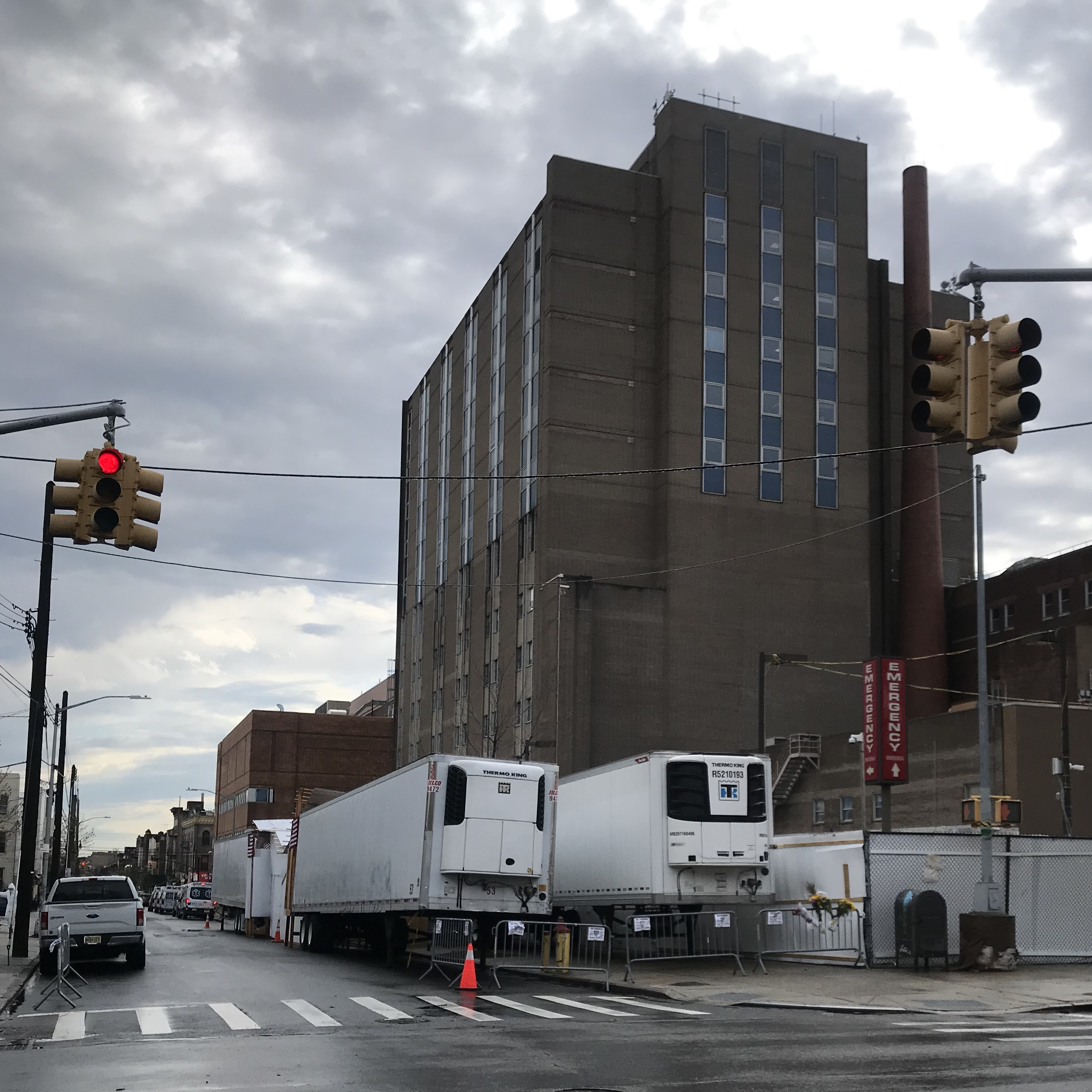
Refrigerated trucks filled with COVID-19 victims outside a hospital

The USNS Comfort hospital ship arrived in New York Harbor on March 30. Field hospitals were also set up in several places citywide. Refrigerator trucks were set up on city streets outside hospitals to accommodate the overflow of bodies of the deceased. On March 31, the first death of a child from COVID-19 in New York City was recorded.

=== April 2020 ===
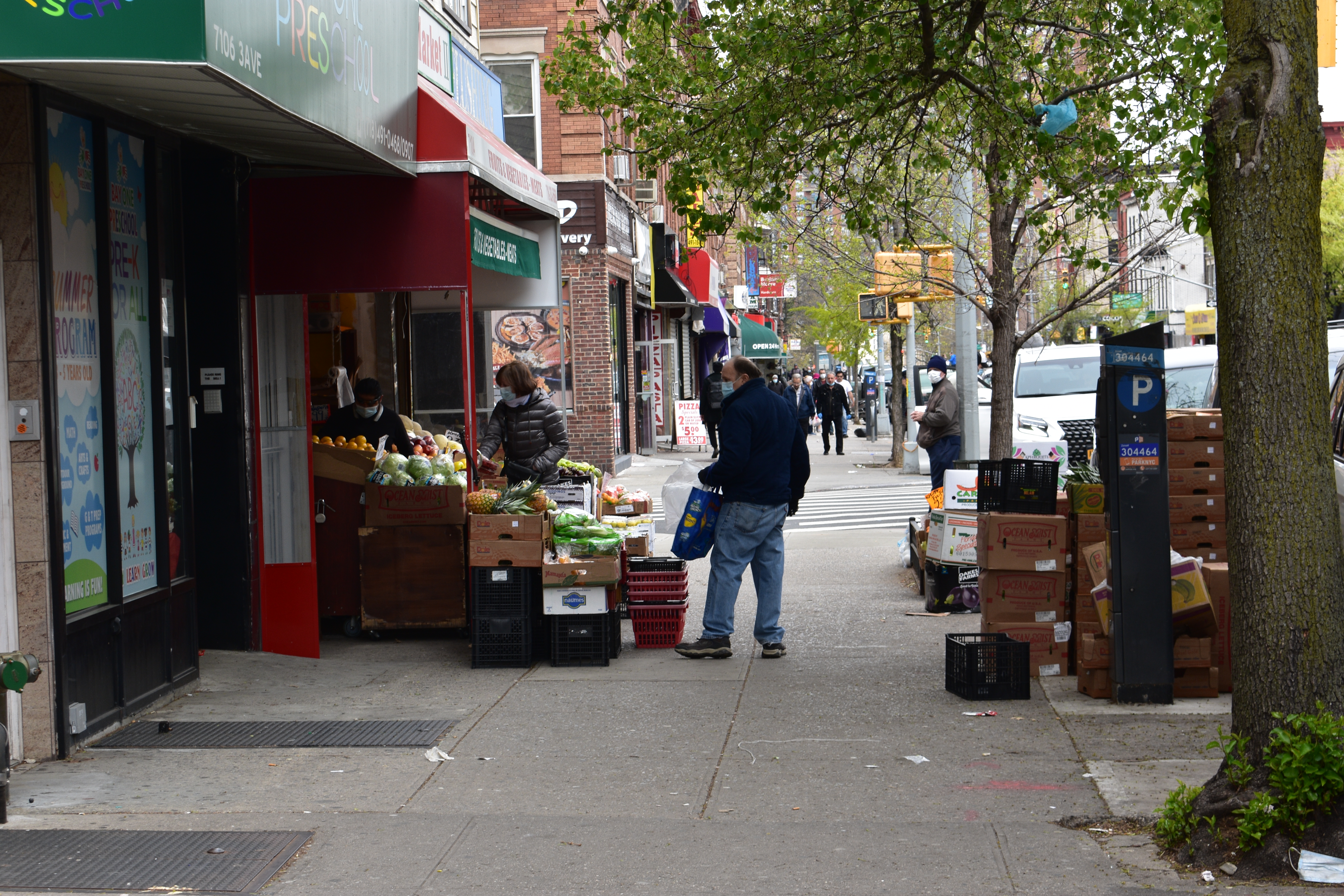
People shopping for fruit in Bay Ridge, Brooklyn in April 2020

On April 4, Governor Cuomo announced that the Chinese government had arranged for a donation of 1,000 ventilators to be sent to New York through foundations run by billionaires Jack Ma and Joseph Tsai. The state of Oregon was reported to be sending 140 ventilators. Trump announced that 1,000 additional federal medical soldiers would be deployed to New York City. It was reported that "Urban Area Medical Task Forces" made up of army reservists would be working in the New York City field hospitals and other parts of the country. As of April 4, there were 1,200 medical military personnel serving on the USNS Comfort. 2,700 New York State National Guard forces had also been deployed.

On April 5, it was reported that a Malayan tiger at the already-closed Bronx Zoo tested positive for COVID-19. This was the first known case of an animal in the US (or a tiger anywhere) being infected with the disease. The tiger had started showing symptoms on March 27, including a dry cough, wheezing, and weakened appetite. The source of the infection was believed to be an infected zookeeper who was not yet showing symptoms. On April 22, it was reported that four additional tigers and three lions had tested positive.

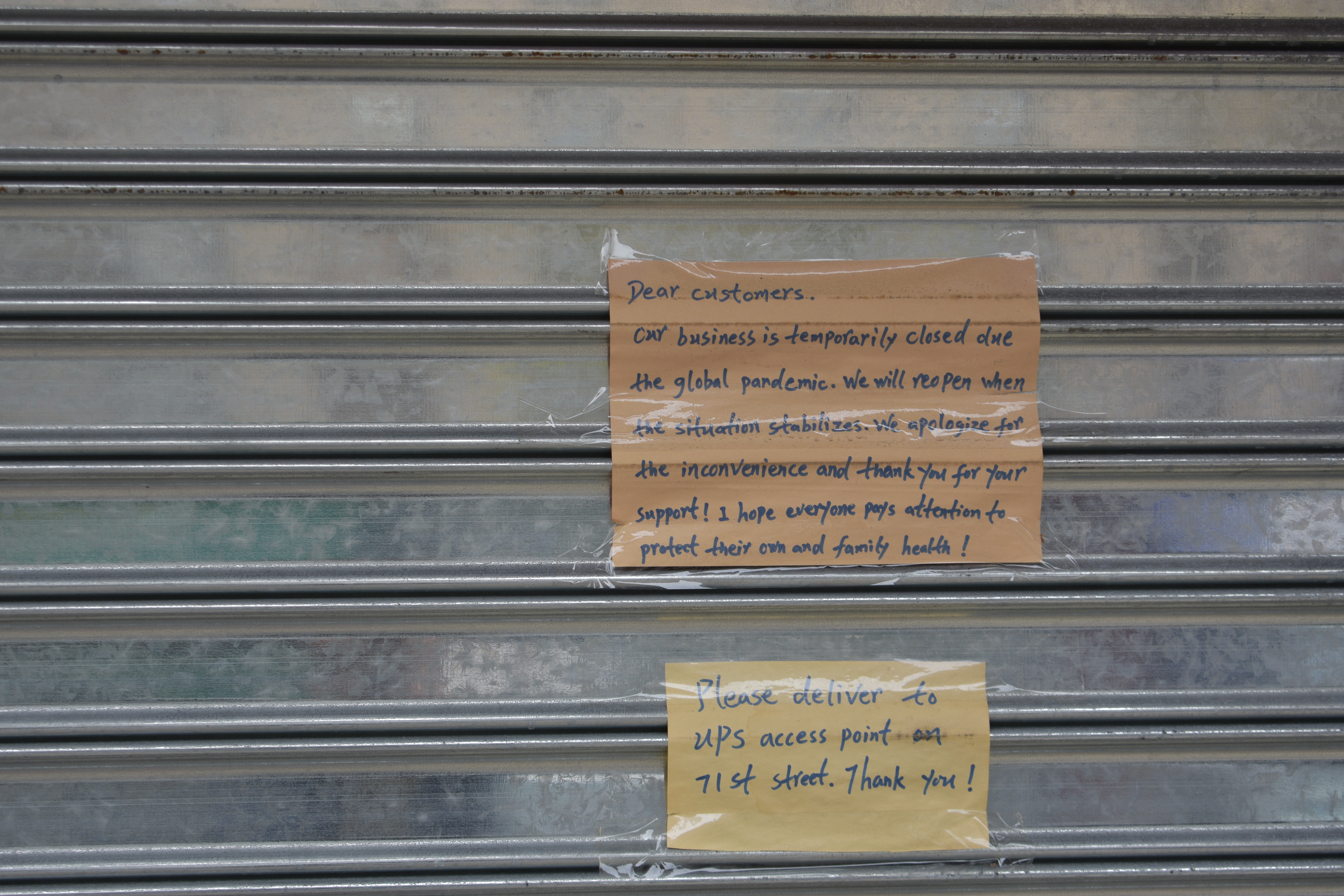
Closed down business in Bay Ridge, Brooklyn in April, 2020

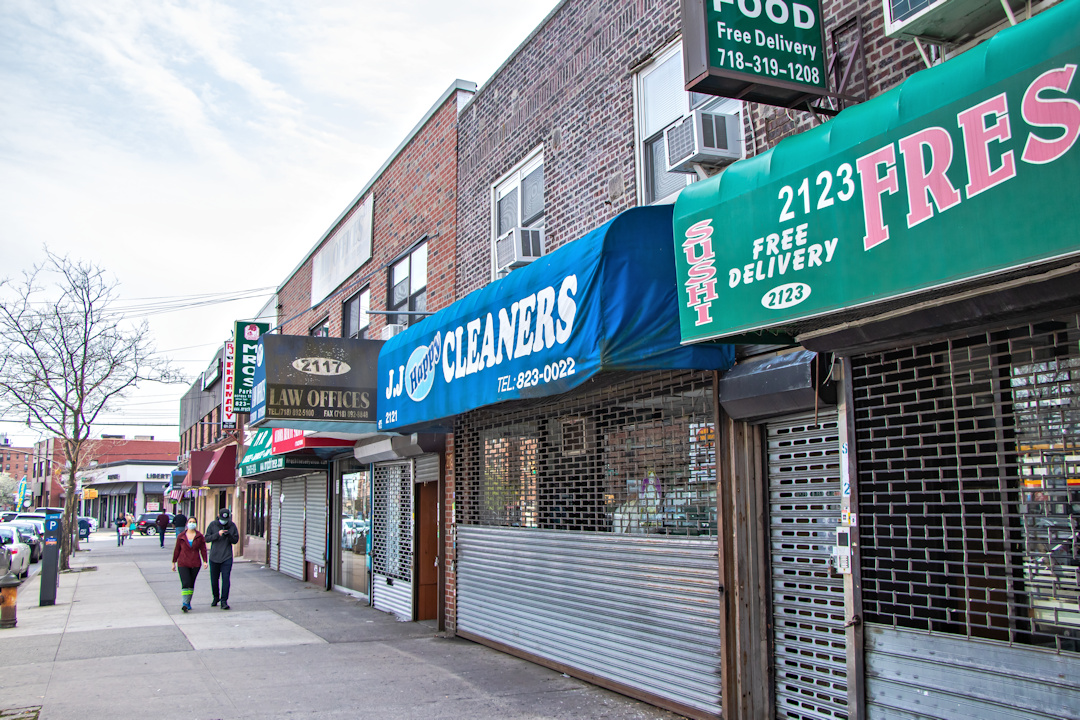
Closed non-essential retailers in Morris Park, the Bronx, during the COVID-19 pandemic

By April 6, New York City had accumulated 72,181 confirmed COVID-19 cases in humans, with at least 2,475 deaths, nearly 25% of the US total. The next day Gothamist reported that the official death toll in New York City was undercounted. It was estimated that 1,125 people had died at home or on the street in NYC in the first five days of April, an eight-fold increase compared with FDNY figures for 2019. Due to the large increase, many of the deaths were presumed to be caused by COVID-19, but only residents with confirmed infections had been recorded in the official count. Due to the crisis circumstances of the pandemic, the real death toll was unknown. Bodies of those who had died at home, around 280 per day, were being picked up by the US Army, National Guard, and Air National Guard.

Some of the communities most affected by the pandemic included densely populated neighborhoods in north-central Queens with high immigrant populations, including Corona, East Elmhurst, Elmhurst, and Jackson Heights. As of April 8, these communities, with a cumulative 600,000 residents, had recorded 7,260 COVID-19 cases. On April 23, state officials said that based on preliminary results of an antibody testing survey, they estimated around 21% of city residents had contracted COVID-19, far more than the number of cases confirmed directly by virus testing.

=== May 2020 ===
On May 10, de Blasio said 38 children citywide were known to be affected by an inflammatory syndrome believed to be linked to an immune response to COVID-19. Known as multisystem inflammatory syndrome in children (MIS-C), this life-threatening condition resembles Kawasaki disease and other pediatric inflammatory conditions, such as toxic shock syndrome. Symptoms include high fevers that can last for days, rash, racing heart beat, changes in skin color, redness of the tongue, and severe abdominal pain. At least one child had died due to MIS-C in New York City, and two additional deaths to MIS-C were reported statewide. The link with COVID-19 has not yet been proven. On May 19, Cuomo confirmed 137 cases of the illness statewide, stating it was "the tip of the iceberg" with 90% of the cases testing positive for the virus or antibodies. By May 26, three deaths and 89 cases of MIS-C had been confirmed in the city, mostly affecting children and teenagers. Doctors reported that the risk of death or serious illness for MIS-C was mitigated by early detection. Hospitals were instructed to prioritize kids for testing.

A survey conducted May 5–12 and reported in the Centers for Disease Control and Prevention's Morbidity and Mortality Weekly Report found that 42% of 286 respondents residing in the New York City metropolitan area knew someone who had tested positive for COVID-19, and 23% knew someone who had died.

During May, active COVID-19 cases started to decline. After the George Floyd protests in New York City started in late May, public officials expressed concern about the spread of COVID-19 via the crowded events.

=== June 2020 ===
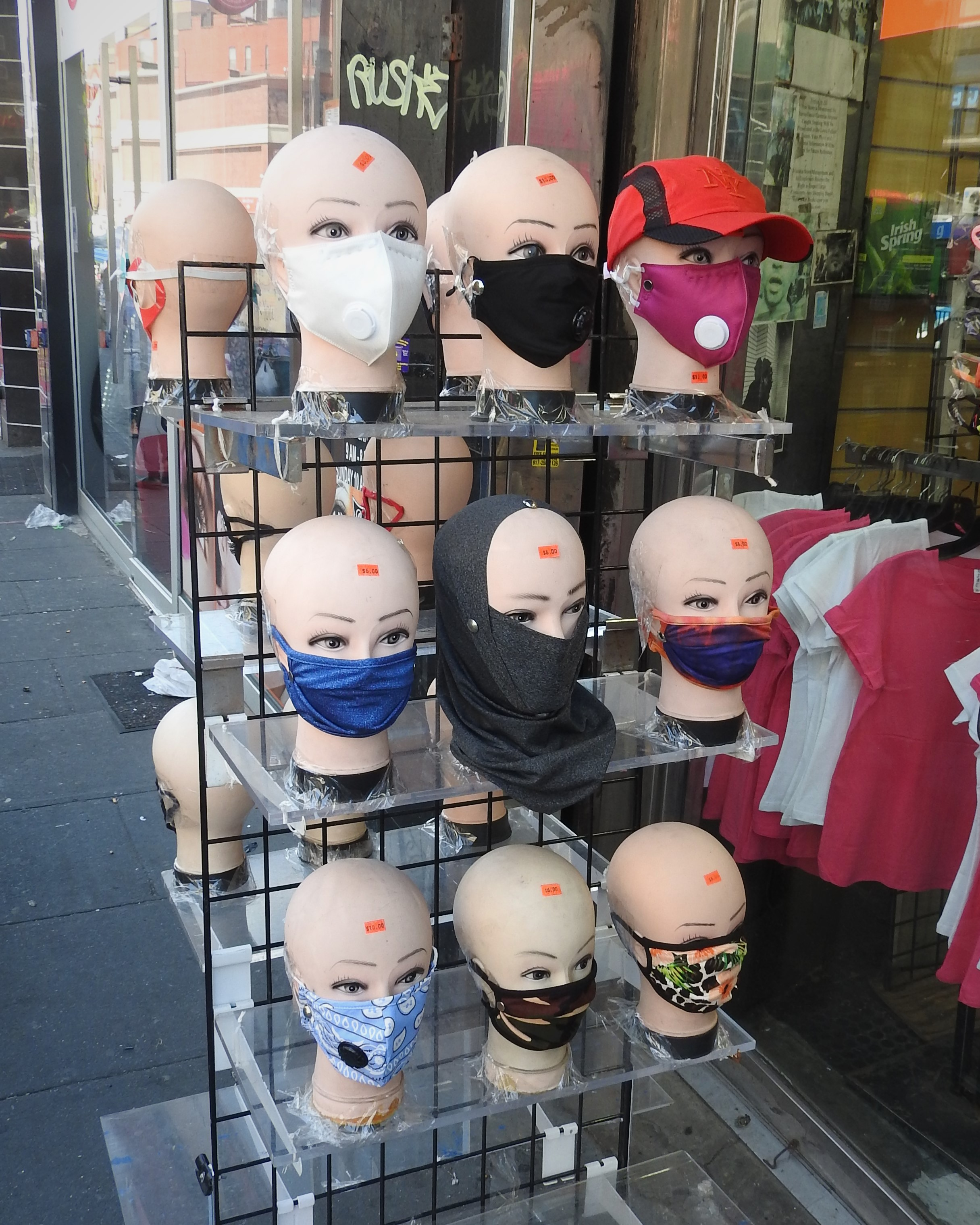
Masks for sale in June, South Bronx

On June 8, the city commenced the first phase of its reopening plan after meeting seven conditions of the stay-at-home order, which had been put in place three months earlier. Business safety protocols were put in place to limit occupancy of confined spaces, like elevators, to one person at a time, and occupancy ceilings were reduced to under 50% of their usual capacity. On June 24, New York state, along with New Jersey and Connecticut, began requiring travelers to self-quarantine for 14 days if traveling from an area with high infection rates. On June 29, Patience and Fortitude, the lion statues outside the New York Public Library Main Branch, were masked as a symbol of the city's resilience.

=== July 2020 ===
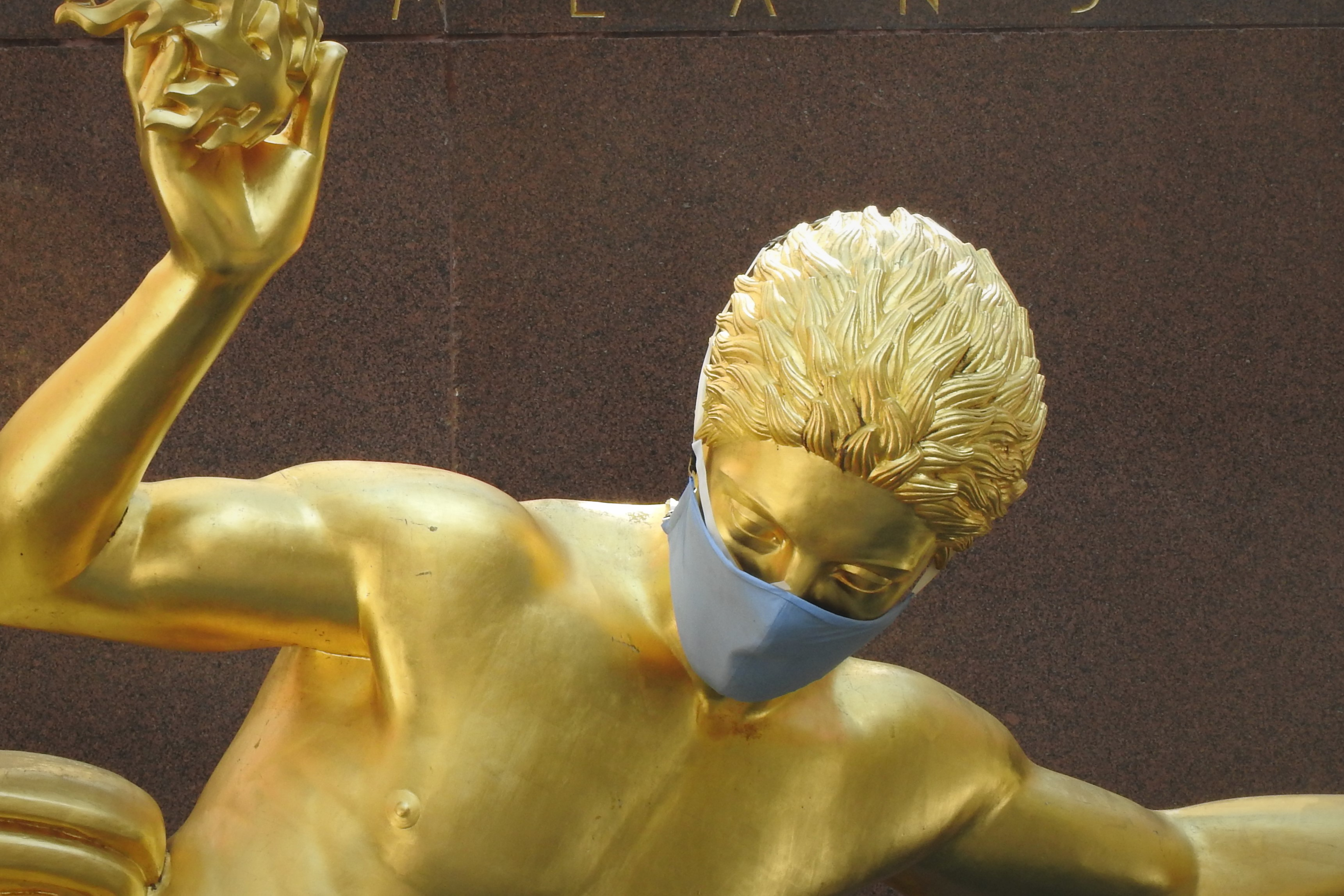
Prometheus, masked for protection

Health experts noted that the effectiveness of contact tracing in preventing resurgence would depend on careful monitoring of hospitalizations and targeted testing of high-risk populations to screen for asymptomatic carriers. The city's COVID hospitalizations fell below 700, the lowest levels since mid-March, but more cases were reported in the age group between 21 and 30.

Plans to open indoor dining during the Phase 3 reopening were postponed due to the heightened risks posed by customers refusing to wear face masks and the uncertain role of air conditioning for COVID spread. Indoor dining in other states had resulted in superspreading at certain venues. To compensate in part, outdoor space was expanded by shutting down certain areas to create more space for outdoor dining. Plans to reopen museums in Phase 4 were also postponed.

The governor's office announced that malls would be allowed to reopen only after installation of antiviral air filtration systems, which was opposed by mall owners and their tenants.

In late July, over 130 bars were cited for violations of COVID-related regulations. The governor warned that bars would be shut down again if compliance did not improve. At least 40 businesses lost their liquor licenses between March and August. Some restaurants reported difficulty controlling the crowds gathered outside, despite hiring security.

On July 11, a seven-year-old German Shepherd named Buddy died of COVID-19. He tested positive back in mid-April when his owners noticed he was having trouble breathing. He was the first dog in the United States to test positive for COVID-19.

=== August 2020 ===
By August 1, the total number of establishments who had their liquor licenses suspended for not following social distancing guidelines had risen to 52. In mid-August, Cuomo announced that bowling alleys would be able to reopen on August 17, and museums and other cultural institutions on August 24, at reduced capacity.

=== September 2020 ===
On the nineteenth anniversary ceremony of the September 11 attacks at the National September 11 Memorial & Museum, the reading of names of victims, usually by family members, was instead recorded in advance. Mask protocols and social distance measures were also in place. The Tunnels to Towers foundation held a simultaneous memorial nearby at Zuccotti Park where around 125 family members took part in reading names.

In late September, parents of yeshiva students in Brooklyn were texted "DO NOT test your child for Covid," advised not to report symptoms consistent with COVID-19, and told that it was "up to parents" to prevent the school from being closed.

On September 25, 37 people tested positive for COVID-19 after a sweet sixteen party at the Miller Place Inn. The inn was fined $10,000 for violating COVID restrictions.

By the end of September, de Blasio had ordered the police department to enforce public health guidelines in several Orthodox Jewish neighborhoods and conduct emergency inspections at private religious schools. President Trump's views on masks were shared by most residents of these neighborhoods, who frequently refused to wear masks or follow the social distancing restrictions. The rate of infection in some predominantly Orthodox neighborhoods rose to six times higher than the rest of the city. City health officials said another lockdown might be needed, similar to the one imposed in Israel, which at the time had the highest per-capita rate of new cases of any country.

=== October 2020 ===
In early October, the city was still in Phase 4 of reopening, which included museums, gardens, botanical gardens and gyms. Twenty ZIP Codes were identified as cluster areas, with an average 5.2% of positive tests, relatively high compared to the rest of New York State. These 20 ZIP Codes contained 26% of all positive cases in the state on October 2. In response, the governor's office announced what they called "direct enforcement" of COVID-19 related restrictions in high-risk neighborhoods in Brooklyn and Queens. The mayor's office proposed closing businesses deemed "non-essential" and on-site dining. In-person schooling would have to shut down in nine ZIP Codes with 14-day positivity rates over 3%, while another eleven ZIP Codes were placed on a "watch list" because their positivity rates were 1–3%. A twelfth ZIP Code was placed on the "watch list" on October 5, the same day that the governor's office rejected the mayor's plan to close non-essential businesses.

Community leaders from the Jewish communities in Queens, including the neighborhoods of Rego Park, Kew Gardens, and Kew Gardens Hills, expressed concerns that singling out neighborhoods and ZIP Codes was unfairly targeting the Jewish community. Councilman Barry Grodenchik said that, "One of the worst things is Jews being blamed for outbreaks and epidemics...slander is akin to murder." Councilwoman Karen Koslowitz said Kew Gardens and Rego Park are diverse neighborhoods and that it was unnecessary to single out Orthodox Jewish communities.

On October 6, Governor Andrew Cuomo introduced a "micro-cluster strategy." The new plan placed tighter restrictions in cluster areas with spikes in COVID-19 cases. The first areas to experience these new restrictions were parts of Brooklyn and Queens. On October 7, protesters opposing the micro-cluster strategy burned masks in the street and set a fire in Borough Park. Clusters have been added and removed since October 6.

There were 779 hospitalizations on October 9, the highest number reported since July 15. Significant fines of up to $15,000 per day were put in place for mass gatherings, and up to $1,000 per day for violations of social distancing and mask-wearing rules. Over the first weekend under the new rules, the city issued over $150,000 in fines. Religious communities protested the restrictions. A federal judge declined to grant an injunction requested by attorneys of a national Orthodox Jewish organization in a legal follow-up, set in motion to prevent restrictions on mass gatherings in houses of worship in red zones, ruling that the state had a compelling state interest to protect the "health and life of all New Yorkers" and that the restrictions were not motivated by any animus. The United States Supreme Court declined to hear similar cases on appeal from two other states.

The New York Sheriff's Office broke up a rave party with over 100 attendees in Queens on October 11. The organizers were charged with multiple criminal offenses, as well as violations of the park and health codes.

On October 17, a wedding at North Fork Country Club with 91 guests resulted in at least 30 positive cases. Suffolk County Executive Steven Bellone recommended the country club be fined $17,000 for having a non-essential gathering of more than 50 people. In Bellport, a birthday party with 50 attendees resulted in at least 26 positive cases.

=== November 2020 ===
On November 10, Governor Cuomo stated that starting November 13 for the entirety of New York state, gatherings were to be limited to 10 people, and gyms, bars, and restaurants must close by 10 pm, with local municipalities handling enforcement responsibility. This came as the positivity rate in the city climbed back above 2.5%, levels not seen since early June, according to Mayor de Blasio.

Public schools were closed indefinitely on November 19 after the rolling seven-day average reached 3%. Despite calls from health experts to close indoor dining before it was too late "to reverse the tide of new infections," the governor's office declined to impose restrictions until the statistical thresholds were met. The mayor's office took charge of closing schools only. Some epidemiologists and public health officials have criticized the decision to close schools, while allowing indoor dining to continue. The school-closure policy was partly reversed less than two weeks later, with de Blasio announcing that elementary schools would resume in-person learning from December 7. However, intermediate and high schools would remain closed through 2021.

By late November, the governor's office was warning that the entire city was approaching the threshold for the "orange zone" designation that would close indoor dining, salons and gyms.

On November 29, New York City police shut down an illegal bottle club with nearly 400 people in attendance. The four party organizers were arrested and charged with holding a mass gathering against health orders and not having a liquor license.

=== December 2020 ===
In the first week of December, there was controversy when a Staten Island tavern, Mac's Public House, publicized its violation of restrictions on bars and restaurants. The bar continued to offer indoor dining despite Cuomo's "orange zone" prohibition, and continued to serve liquor after the New York State Liquor Authority had suspended its license. After the New York City Sheriff's Office shut down Mac's on December 1 and arrested its owner, several hundred people gathered to protest the shutdown.

After warning it was likely, Governor Cuomo announced that indoor dining would be suspended again on December 14.

COVID-19 vaccinations were authorized by the US Food and Drug Administration on December 11. New York administered the vaccine first to health-care workers, and then to nursing-home residents starting December 21.

A video of 50 members and maskless dancers at a Republican Club party in Queens became widely publicized on December 21. At the time, gatherings of more than ten people were prohibited.

On December 23, following concerns over a new SARS-CoV-2 variant from the United Kingdom, de Blasio issued an order for travelers from the UK to quarantine or otherwise face fines of $1,000.

On December 27, New York State announced a criminal investigation into ParCare Community Health Network for "fraudulently" obtaining vaccine doses and administering them to persons who were not within the designated priority groups to receive the first doses of vaccine. ParCare is owned and operated by Hasidic business owner Gary Schlesinger. The clinic denied the allegations.

Public health researchers estimated that 44 percent of metro New York residents had been infected by December 31, 2020, based on a combination of virus testing, antibody testing, fatality counts, and population mobility data.

== 2021 ==
=== January 2021 ===
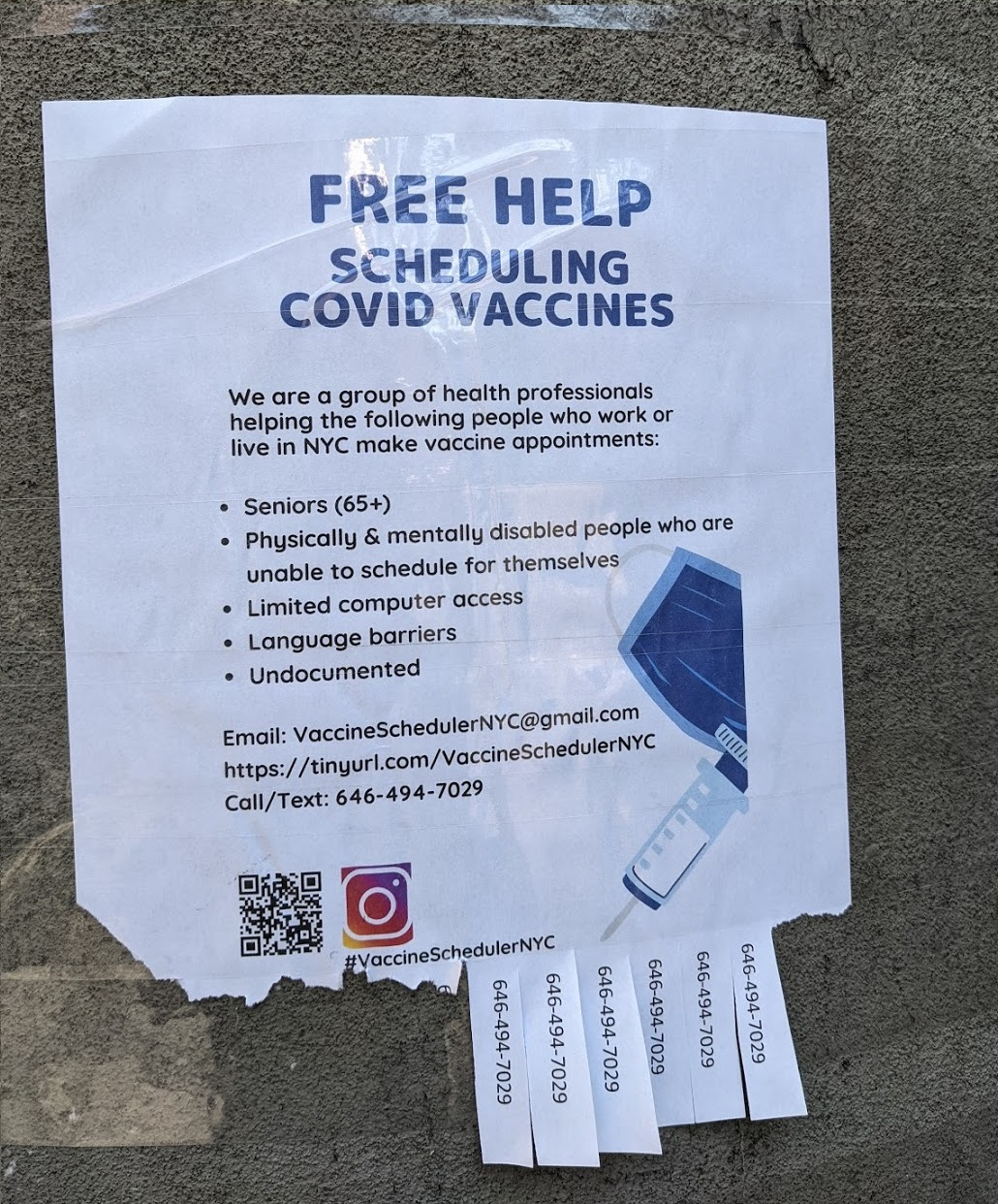
Flyer on Roosevelt Island offers help scheduling vaccine appointments for vulnerable populations, March 2021

New York State lowered its vaccine age from 75 to 65 on January 11, 2021. As of January 25, 2021, 628,831 vaccines had been administered in New York City. During the last week of the month, the city was averaging 5,000 new cases per day and around 60 deaths per day. Brooklyn's Bensonhurst and Brighton Beach neighborhoods, Queens's South Ozone Park and Flushing neighborhoods, Staten Island's South Beach area, and Manhattan's Washington Heights neighborhood were the hardest hit areas at the time, with positive test results in the 10% range.

=== February 2021 ===
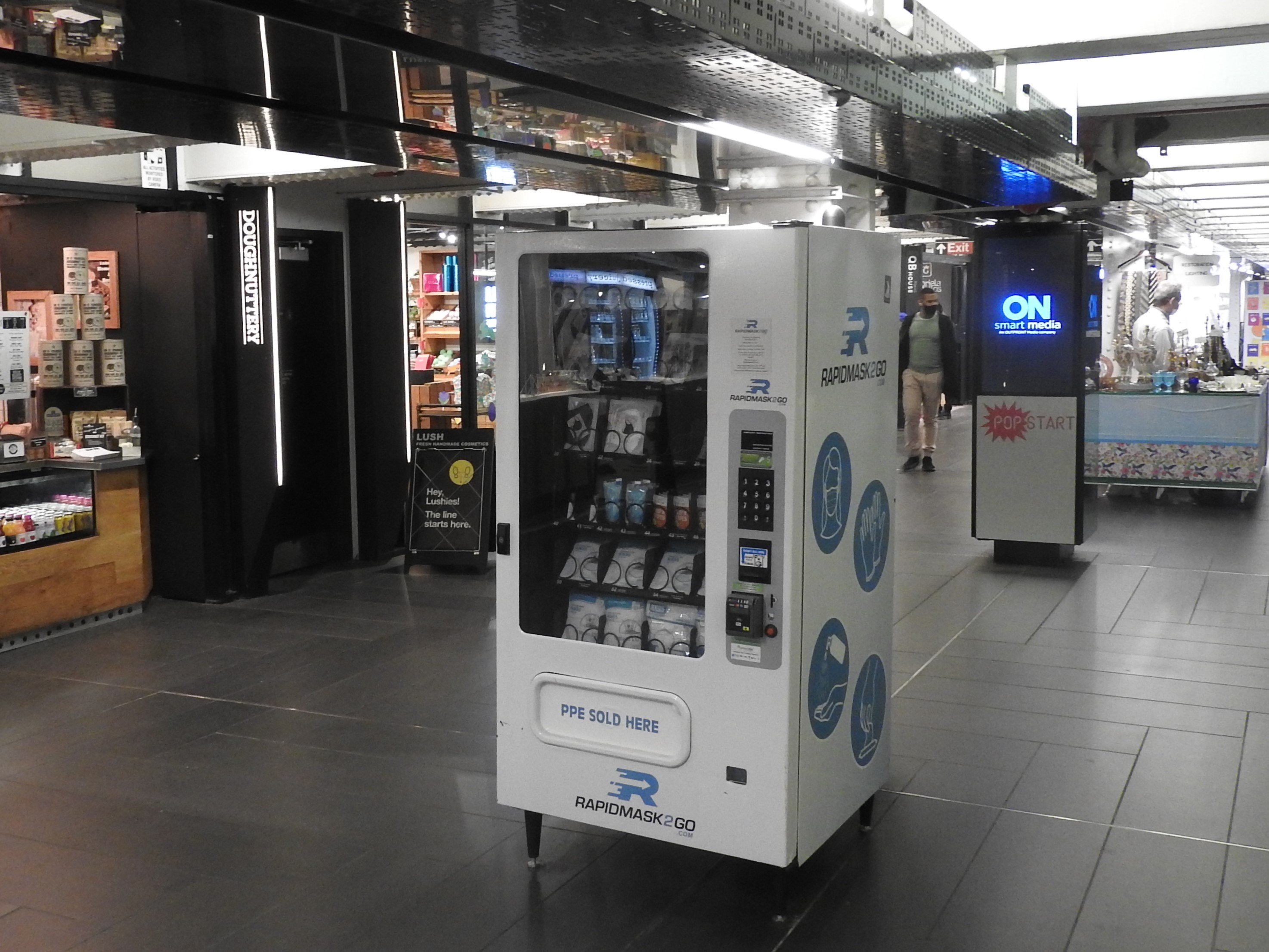
Mask vending machine in a subway station, April 2021

In February 2021, New York City expanded its vaccination Phase 1b to include restaurant workers (including delivery workers) and taxi drivers (including FHV drivers).

On February 8, it was announced that public middle schools would reopen for in-person learning on February 25.

The MTA announced that overnight subway service, suspended since May 2020, would be partially restored as long as hospitalization and infection rates continued to decrease. On February 14, the closing time for restaurants, bars, gyms and other establishments was extended to 11 p.m.

=== March 2021 ===
On March 8, it was announced that public high schools would reopen for in-person learning on March 22.

The "cluster zone" restrictions were lifted in late March. Indoor fitness classes resumed. Vaccine eligibility was expanded to New Yorkers over the age of 50. The first case of the Brazilian P.1 variant was confirmed.

=== April 2021 ===
On April 29, de Blasio announced that New York City would fully reopen on July 1.

=== May 2021 ===
On May 3, Cuomo announced that the overnight subway closures would end on May 17, 2021, with 24-hour service resuming on that date.

On May 12, the Metropolitan Transportation Authority launched a five-day pilot project of walk-up COVID-19 vaccination sites in eight of its subway, Metro-North and Long Island Rail Road stations. This pilot project was subsequently extended another week at Penn Station and Grand Central Terminal. Over 11,000 people received the one-shot Janssen COVID-19 vaccine as part of the program.

=== June 2021 ===
By June, the city's overall testing positivity rate had reached its lowest since the pandemic began. Since the first vaccines arrived in December, over 8,408,000 doses were administered. Governor Cuomo reopened the entirety of New York State on June 15, two weeks ahead of Mayor Bill de Blasio's planned July 1 reopening.

=== July 2021 ===
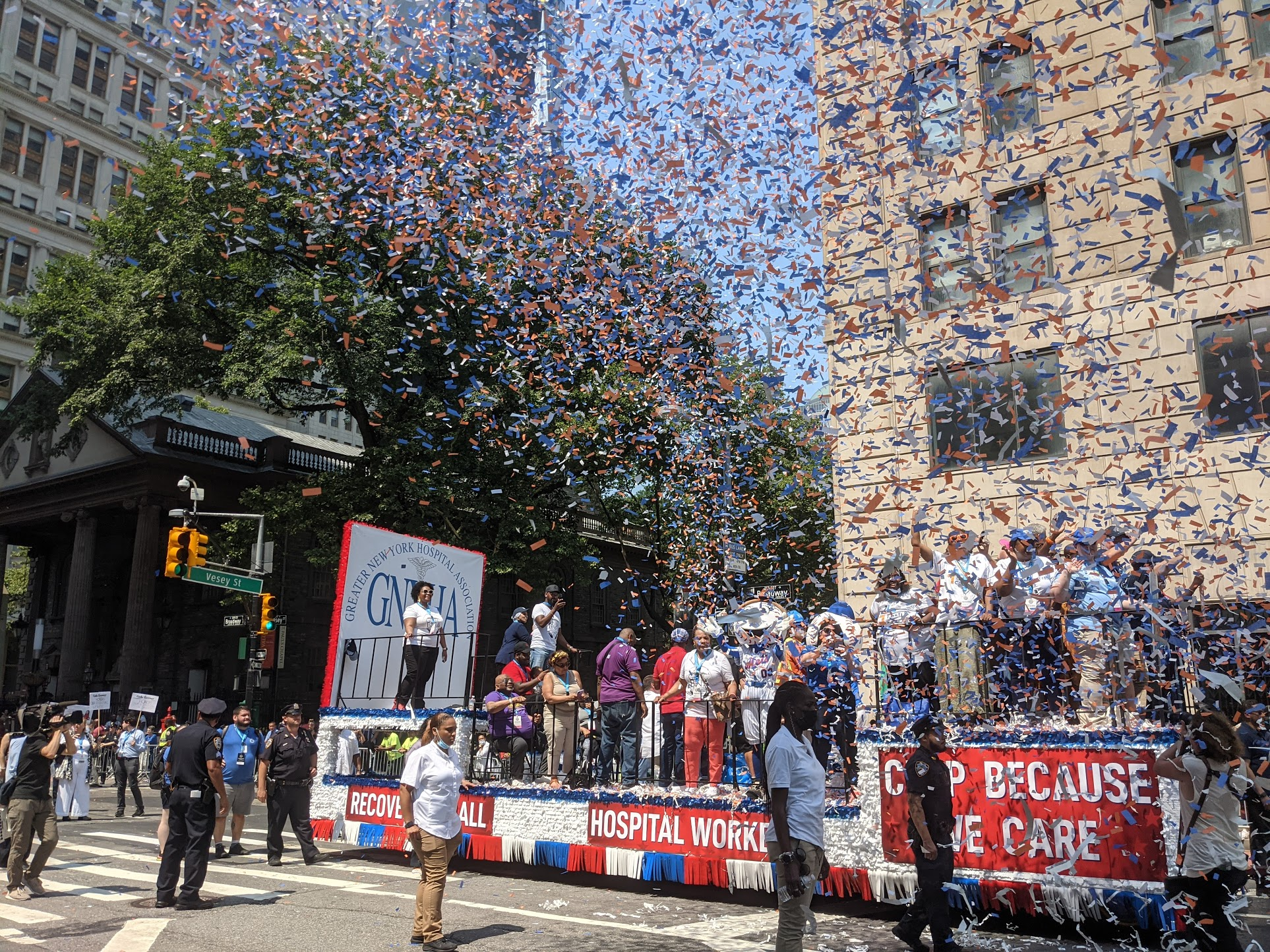
Healthcare workers being honored for their efforts in combatting COVID-19 during a July 7, 2021 ticker-tape parade for essential workers in New York, NY

On July 7, 2021, the city held a "Hometown Heroes" ticker tape parade to honor healthcare professionals and essential workers for their work during the pandemic. The Uniformed Firefighters Association asked its members to boycott the event, however, saying that COVID-related risks to firefighters had not yet ended, citing the case of a union member who was in the ICU with COVID-related pneumonia at the time of the parade. The Uniformed EMS Officers Union also asked its members not to attend the parade due to an ongoing dispute with the city over a lack of hazard pay during the pandemic.

On July 23, 2021, the city's health department announced that daily average cases were 32% higher than the prior week and that the Delta variant had become the dominant COVID strain, accounting for 57% of citywide samples over a four-week period. Mayor Bill de Blasio responded to the new data by pleading with private employers to "move immediately to some form of mandate" for COVID-19 vaccination.

=== August 2021 ===
On August 2, 2021, de Blasio recommended that vaccinated people wear masks in indoor settings, following CDC guidance and a continued uptick in positive COVID cases due to the Delta variant. The next day, it was announced that masks would be required indoors beginning August 16.

On August 3, de Blasio announced that New York City would become the first in the United States to require proof of vaccination for workers and customers at all indoor dining establishments, gyms, entertainment venues, and performances. As of August 16, patrons would be expected to show either their vaccination cards or one of two authorized vaccine passport apps: the city's NYC COVID Safe app or the state's Excelsior app. The requirement will start to be enforced in September.

Following the announcement of the citywide vaccination requirement, the New York Young Republican Club began to organize an opposition movement. A march on Gracie Mansion took place on August 15, featuring speakers such as Curtis Sliwa, Guardian Angels founder and 2021 New York Republican mayoral candidate, and Andrew Giuliani, the eldest child of Rudy Giuliani and 2022 New York Republican gubernatorial candidate.

On August 23, de Blasio said that all Department of Education employees—including teachers, principals, and other staff—must receive at least the first dose of a COVID-19 vaccine by September 27.

=== September 2021 ===
On September 10, three days prior to de Blasio's requirement that all of the city's municipal employees would need to report to full-time, in-person work, Comptroller Scott Stringer announced that his department would be defying the mayor's directive until at least October 12, citing the evolving situation in regard to the delta variant and the need to develop hybrid work options. On the same day, several municipal unions sued the city over the mayor's tightened vaccination requirements for employees of the public school system, which had ended the option to opt out of the vaccination mandate through weekly coronavirus testing.

During the first week of the city's enforcement of the vaccine mandate, which started on September 13, it was found that 11 out of 15 restaurants investigated by Inside Edition, or just over 73% of the restaurants that producers visited, were still not enforcing the mandate for indoor dining.

In mid-September, amid the first in-person return of foreign dignitaries during the pandemic, Mayor de Blasio informed the president-elect of the United Nations General Assembly that the UN General Assembly Hall qualified as a convention center and thus would be subject to the city's vaccine mandate. The Biden administration also expressed worries that the UNGA would become a "superspreader event" and Biden's UN Ambassador, Linda Thomas-Greenfield, urged diplomats to participate remotely. Jair Bolsonaro, the unvaccinated president of Brazil, announced that he would be attending the General Assembly in person, in defiance of the mandate, and the Russian Ambassador to the UN, Vassily Nebenzia, criticized the mandate as "discriminatory" and in violation of U.S. agreements with the UN regarding the establishment of the New York headquarters in 1947. The Russian protest led UNGA president-elect Abdulla Shahid to announce that vaccination requirements would be based entirely on an honor system.

=== October 2021 ===
On October 4, the vaccination requirement for all of New York City's public school teachers and staff went into full effect, with unvaccinated staff members being placed on unpaid leave and not allowed to report to work. Three days earlier, on October 1, the U.S. Supreme Court denied an emergency injunction to block the mandate's implementation, allowing the city to move forward with its plans to enforce compliance.

=== November 2021 ===
On November 1, all New York City employees who had not received at least one shot of a COVID-19 vaccination would be put on unpaid leave. City officials announced that they had instituted a variety of contingency plans to deal with a shortage of first responders due to vaccine hesitancy.

=== December 2021 ===
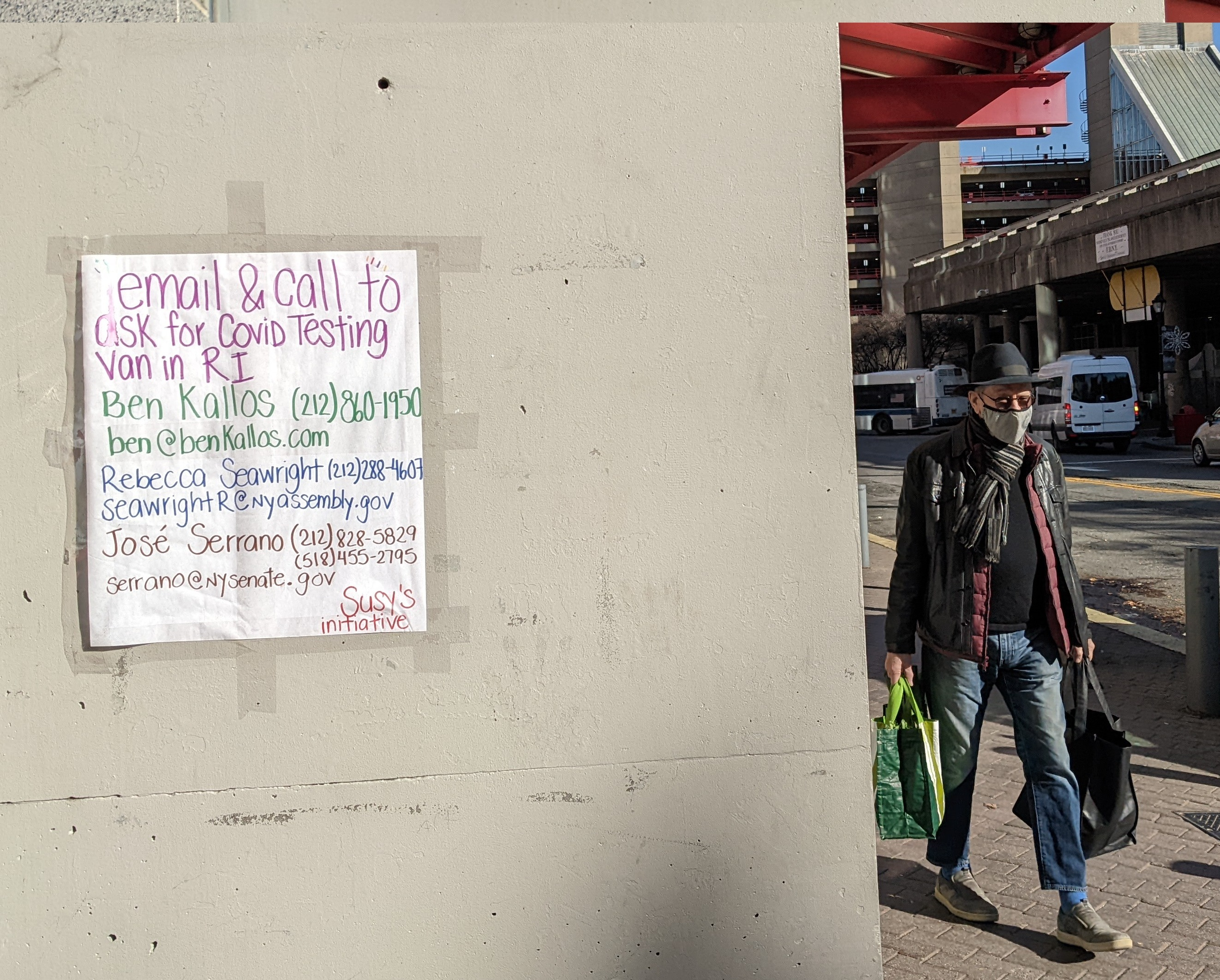
December 2021 parent petition initiative outside P.S./I.S. 217 on Roosevelt Island, calling for the return of mobile COVID testing to the island after a spike in positive cases

On December 2, the second reported U.S. case of the highly mutated Omicron variant was found in a Minnesota man who had recently returned from a trip to New York City to attend an anime convention at the Javits Center. Governor Hochul urged attendees of the convention to get tested, while Mayor de Blasio remarked that the city had activated its contact tracing program to locate and make contact with people who had attended the event.

On December 6, in response to a surge in cases and unknowns regarding the Omicron variant, New York City became the first American city to issue a general vaccine mandate for all private-sector employees, broadening a previous mandate for public-sector employees to cover all workers within the city's five boroughs. De Blasio announced that the expanded mandate would take effect on December 27, just days before Mayor-elect Eric Adams would take office on January 1, 2022.

On December 19, de Blasio requested assistance from the Biden administration due to a rapid increase in Omicron cases throughout the city. He specifically asked the White House to invoke the Defense Production Act to produce greater numbers of at-home COVID tests as well as requesting greater access for monoclonal antibody treatments and FDA fast-tracking of Pfizer's antiviral pill.

On December 23, COVID data released by the city showed that Manhattan's Greenwich Village neighborhood had some of the highest levels of infection in the United States over the preceding 7-day period, which, at nearly 3% test positivity, was 18 times higher than the percentage of residents testing positive in the other East Coast Omicron hotspot of Washington, D.C. during the same time frame. Several days later, on December 26, the MTA announced that it would be reducing train service for several days, due to a high number of its employees falling ill or undergoing quarantine.

== 2022 ==
=== January 2022 ===
Due to the rapid spread of the Omicron variant and its vaccine breakthrough potential, the New York City Department of Education modified its policy of randomly selecting 10% of unvaccinated students for weekly testing into a policy of testing all students twice per week when schools reopened after winter break on January 3. Instead of requiring entire classes to shift to remote learning after a positive case, however, all students in a class with a confirmed case would begin to receive rapid at-home tests, with asymptomatic students able to return the day after their first negative test.

=== February 2022 ===
City employees were given a final deadline of February 11 to provide proof of COVID-19 vaccination or face termination. This cutoff date covered new employees who had not submitted proof of a second vaccination (if required as part of a series) and unvaccinated employees who had been placed on unpaid leave in November 2021 yet had not elected to continue receiving health benefits past June 2022. Following the rejection of an emergency appeal to the U.S. Supreme Court on behalf of a group of teachers, New York City commenced with the firing of 1,430 workers for noncompliance with the vaccine mandate.

=== March 2022 ===
Mayor Eric Adams announced that March 7 would mark the end of vaccination requirements for indoor activities throughout the city, as well as the end of required masking in schools except for children under five years of age, who were not yet eligible for vaccination. The city's health commissioner, David Chokshi, unveiled a new color-coded system for the shift to 'living with COVID,' which would recommend the reintroduction of vaccine and masking mandates in the event of a future surge in cases.

On March 24, Mayor Adams exempted athletes and performers from the city's vaccine mandate for private-sector employers, allowing prominent unvaccinated athletes, such as Kyrie Irving of the Brooklyn Nets, to once again play in home games. A collection of union leaders and elected officials, including City Council Speaker Adrienne Adams, criticized the move as creating a double standard for elite, celebrity New Yorkers.

Due to the BA.2 Omicron subvariant, the city's daily case average was up 43% at the end of March, compared to the average case count of the prior four weeks. Hospitalizations and deaths continued to decrease, however.

=== April 2022 ===
Following the uptick of BA.2 cases, Mayor Adams decided to maintain the city's mask mandate for preschool children, who were not yet eligible for vaccination. Adams had previously planned to rescind the mask requirement in early April, yet it remained in place after the mayor prevailed in a legal challenge to the mandate.

The NYC Health Department's "Test & Trace Corps" is slated to conclude its universal contact tracing mandate on April 30. The program, which started in June 2020, after the first COVID-19 surge, had funding allocated for the entirety of the 2022 fiscal year and would continue to contact "known positives", conduct limited tracing efforts, and perform other COVID-related public health services, such as the distribution of at-home tests.

On Sunday, April 10, Mayor Adams tested positive for COVID-19 after a PCR test. Adams, who was exhibiting minor symptoms, cancelled all of his public events for the following week and began taking newly available antiviral medications, which he recommended to other COVID-positive New Yorkers. He had previously attended the Gridiron Club Dinner superspreader event in Washington, D.C. on April 2. Adams commanded the city's response to the April 12 subway attack remotely, while quarantining at his mayoral residence of Gracie Mansion.

=== May 2022 ===
On May 2, New York City entered the medium risk level (yellow), moving beyond the low risk (green) level for the first time since the new color-coded risk system was unveiled by the city in March 2022. The new risk system was based on revised CDC risk guidelines and suggested various actions that the city and its residents could choose to take in response to an uptick in cases as reopening continued. The city's risk level was further upgraded to high risk level (orange) on May 17; indoor mask usage was suggested but not mandated.

=== June 2022 ===
In June, Mayor Adams announced that, since the city was past its most recent surge in COVID cases, masking for children ages 2–4 would no longer be compulsory within the public school system as of June 13. Vaccines for children under 5 years of age would not be available until June 21.

=== July 2022 ===
Amid hospitalizations, yet not deaths, reaching 4-month highs in the city, Mayor Adams scrapped the color-coded risk system, saying that he would not use an "old weapon" to fight "new wars" against highly contagious subvariants, and that the city would role out a new alert system in the weeks to follow. By July 8, city officials recommended that all New Yorkers wear highly protective N95, KN95 or KF94 masks in all indoor settings and in crowded areas outside.

=== August 2022 ===
The August 2022 conversion of city-run COVID-19 vaccination sites for children under 5 into Monkeypox vaccination centers drew condemnation from some parents and local politicians for taking place just weeks before the new school year. At the time, toddlers had only been eligible for vaccination for less than two months.

=== September 2022 ===
On September 7, 2022, following Governor Hochul's decision to end the statewide transit mask mandate due to Omicron-specific boosters and stabilizing infection rates, the MTA revised its guidelines to say that masks were "encouraged but optional" throughout the system. Mask mandates were left in place for all healthcare settings and adult care facilities in the city and throughout New York State.

A report by Partnership for New York City surveyed more than 160 major Manhattan office employers in late August and early September 2022 and found that 49 percent of office workers are currently at the workplace on an average weekday, up from just 38 percent in April. The study also found that 9 percent of employees are in the office five days a week.

=== October 2022 ===
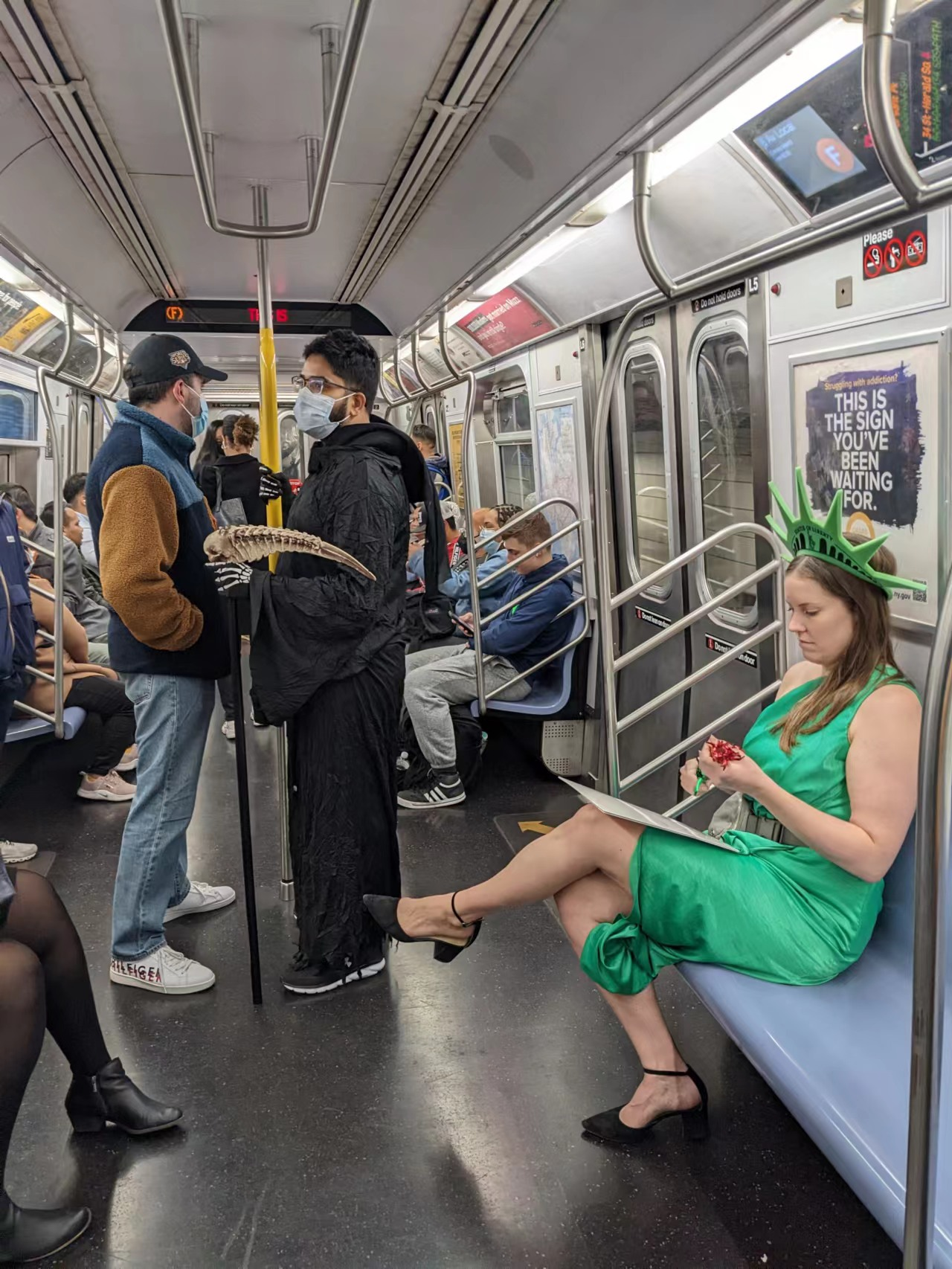
Halloween 2022 in New York City, the first of the pandemic without a citywide public transit mask mandate.

Justice Ralph Porzio of Staten Island's supreme court ruled on October 24, 2022, that a group of municipal employees fired for noncompliance with the city's municipal worker vaccine mandate should be reinstated with back pay. The group of municipal workers were represented by attorney Chad J. LaVeglia. The city appealed his ruling the next day, on October 25, thus maintaining the municipal worker vaccine mandate.

=== November 2022 ===
The most strict provisions of the New York's vaccine mandate, requiring vaccination for private-sector employees and for "high risk" after-school activities, were ended with unanimous approval by New York City health leaders on November 1, 2022. The rollback of public health measures for schoolchildren also came amid the backdrop of the 2022 pediatric care crisis.

=== December 2022 ===
On December 2, 2022, Chanette Lewis of Brooklyn pleaded guilty to defrauding New York City by offering to sell hotel rooms that were intended for free use in the city's pandemic isolation program. While working at a call center for the program in 2020 and 2021, she stole the identities of healthcare workers and sold the data to co-conspirators who would, in turn, resell the rooms to ineligible individuals.

The Pandemic Response Lab, which processed 10 million COVID-19 tests for New Yorkers and tracked the development and spread of COVID variants in the city during the pandemic, announced that it would close at the end of December. The closure came amid a rising tide of COVID-19, flu, and RSV cases in the city and a renewed suggestion of indoor masking by municipal public health authorities.

== 2023 ==
=== January 2023 ===
As of January 6, 2023, over one third of New York City neighborhoods had COVID-19 positivity rates in excess of 20% and four out of five neighborhoods exceeded 15%, largely due to the highly infectious XBB.1.5 variant. This particular variant accounted for 80.8% of the city's cases, compared to the projected U.S. prevalence of 61%.

=== February 2023 ===
In early February, Mayor Adams announced that February 10, 2023 would mark the end of New York City's vaccine mandate for city workers, due to 96 percent of city workers having received their primary COVID-19 vaccination series. On the same date, city schools would also no longer require visitors to provide proof of vaccination to enter school buildings. On February 10, the city also sunsetted its text-based COVID-19 notification service, imploring New Yorkers to "stay safe" in a final text marking the end of the program.

At the same time that the city began to end pandemic-era programs and policies, Mayor Adams confronted a more long-lasting shift in attitudes toward remote work, leading to a U-turn in his remote work policy that originally favored a full-scale return to in-person work one year prior, in February 2022. Instead, after the city struggled to fill job vacancies due to a refusal to allow remote or hybrid work, Adams announced, on February 14, that he had tasked city agencies with discovering "creative ways of having flexibility."

=== March 2023 ===
On March 1, 2023, three years after the New York City's first recorded case, the city reached a settlement in a lawsuit filed by four FDNY EMS personnel who had alleged violation of their federal free speech and due process rights for their persecution after speaking out to reporters about harsh work conditions and an overall lack of protective equipment early in the pandemic. Each were awarded $29,999 in damages.

=== June 2023 ===
As of late May and early June, each of the city's 14 wastewater treatment plants showed high concentrations of SARS-CoV-2. City officials acknowledged the uptick but noted that it was too early to say if the data indicated a new wave of infections. There was not, however, a concurrent rise in the number of confirmed cases, due to rollbacks in funding and data reporting requirements associated with the end of the national public health emergency in early May.

=== August 2023 ===
Mid-August data from the city's health department confirmed a summer wave in New York City, with the seven-day average of total cases reaching 672 on August 14 in the city, compared to 289 on May 16. Hospitalizations and deaths remained relatively low at the time and the surge of cases appeared to be less severe than the previous two summers.
