= Ezra J. William =

Indonesian socialite

- Born: 7 September 1989 (age 36); Jakarta, Indonesia
- Education: New York University
- Occupations: Socialite, fashion blogger, restaurateur
- Television: Rich Kids of Instagram

Ezra J. William (born 7 September 1989) is an Indonesian socialite, fashion blogger, and restaurateur.

== Early life and education ==
Ezra J. William was born in Jakarta, Indonesia and grew up in Singapore, Los Angeles, and Hong Kong. He is the son of an Indonesian real estate mogul.

He moved from Indonesia to the United States to attend New York University and lives in the West Village in Manhattan. He graduated from New York University with a degree in business with a concentration in marketing, advertising, and public relations.

== Career ==
William appeared in the British reality television documentary Rich Kids of Instagram in 2015.

He is also a founding member of the House of Slay, a collective of fashion industry insiders fighting racial discrimination against Asians.

== Personal life ==
As a socialite, William has been referred to as part of the "Snap Pack", a group of New York City youth including Andrew Warren, Kyra Kennedy, Tiffany Trump, Reya Benitez, EJ Johnson, and Gaïa Jacquet-Matisse. He is also noted for his close friendships with Paris Hilton and Nicky Hilton Rothschild.
