= Rich Kids of Instagram: A Novel =

2014 novel

- Author: Maya Sloan; Unnamed creator of RKOI
- Publisher: Gallery Books
- Publication date: July 2014
- ISBN: 9781476764061

Rich Kids of Instagram is a novel written by Maya Sloan and the anonymous creator of the Tumblr blog of the same name, on which it is based. It was first published by Gallery Books, an imprint of Simon & Schuster, in July 2014. Its cover featured a picture of a line of cocaine powder on a hundred-dollar bill.

== Main characters ==
The story is told by various characters within the novel, which unfolds as a series of vignettes about ultra-wealthy teens and twenty-somethings indulging themselves.

The fictionalized characters include Todd Evergreen, an overnight billionaire and recluse who is new in town; Annalise Hoff, a self-described "Daddy's girl" who plans a party in The Hamptons; and her boyfriend Miller Crawford, an aspiring record producer who is high all the time.

== Reception ==
A review in The Booklist said, "Sloan provides enough satirical jabs at all those annoying instant Internet millionaires to make reading about them both palatable and entertaining." Cosmopolitan agreed, saying, "You'll love hating the spoiled hashtaggers".

A review in The Baffler was more negative, calling it "an empty vessel of careless adolescent fantasy".

== See also ==
- Rich Kids of the Internet
