= Rich Kids of Beverly Hills =

American reality television series

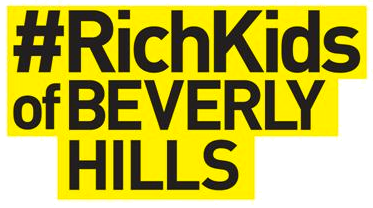
- Genre: Reality television
- Created by: Doron Ofir; David Leepson
- Starring: Dorothy Wang; Morgan Stewart; Roxy Sowlaty; Brendan Fitzpatrick; Jonny Drubel; EJ Johnson; Taylor Ann Hasselhoff; Bianca Espada
- Country of origin: United States
- Original language: English
- No. of seasons: 4
- No. of episodes: 35 (list of episodes)

Production
- Executive producers: Gennifer Gardiner; David Leepson; Brian Zagorski; Eric Kranzler; Doron Ofir
- Producers: Morgan Stewart; Dorothy Wang
- Production locations: Los Angeles, California
- Camera setup: Multi-Camera
- Running time: 42 minutes
- Production companies: ITV Studios America; Gennfier Gardiner TV; Leepson Bounds Entertainment

Original release
- Network: E!
- Release: January 19, 2014 – June 19, 2016

Related
- EJNYC

Rich Kids of Beverly Hills (stylized as #RichKids of Beverly Hills) is an American reality television series that premiered on E!, on January 19, 2014. The series focuses on a group of twenty-something millionaires and billionaires (by inheritance) showcasing their lives.

== Development ==
Dorothy was found on Instagram by the casting directors. She went in for an interview with the production company and they told her to bring in her friends. She brought in Morgan Stewart and they did an on camera interview tape. Six weeks later the show was greenlit at E!. Morgan also revealed that on the first day of filming she and the cast did not realise how much work goes into filming a reality show. She explains that after the first week of filming she was so exhausted and she was sick throughout the filming of season one because she didn't have the stamina and never had to work so hard on something.

== Cast ==
The first season of the series focused on Dorothy Wang, daughter of Taiwanese billionaire businessman Roger Wang; blogger Morgan Stewart, her boyfriend Brendan Fitzpatrick, realtor; songwriter Jonny Drubel, and Roxy Sowlaty. The first season premiered on January 19, 2014. EJ Johnson, son of basketball player Magic Johnson, also made frequent appearances throughout the season.

On March 26, 2014, it was announced that the show had been renewed for a second season, which premiered on August 3, 2014. The entire cast returned to the show for the second season as Johnson returned in a main capacity. E! announced the show's third season in April 2015. The same month, it was announced Taylor-Ann Hasselhoff, daughter of actor David Hasselhoff, would be joining the series in a main capacity. The third season premiered on May 24, 2015.

In December 2015, it was announced that E! had renewed the show for a fourth season which premiered on May 1, 2016. Subsequently it was announced that neither Sowlaty nor Hasselhoff would return, while Bianca Espada was cast as a series regular. Stewart and Wang also served as producers for the season. Johnson's sister Elisa Johnson and close friend Drew Mac made frequent appearances throughout the season. Stewart and Fitzpatrick married in the series finale. However they separated in August 2019.

=== Timeline of cast members ===
Cast members	Seasons			
Cast members	1	2	3	4
Morgan Stewart	Main	Main	Main	Main
Dorothy Wang	Main	Main	Main	Main
Roxy Sowlaty	Main	Main	Main	
Jonny Drubel	Main	Main	Main	Main
Brendan Fitzpatrick	Main	Main	Main	Main
EJ Johnson	Friend	Main	Main	Main
Taylor-Ann Hasselhoff			Main	
Bianca Espada				Main

== Episodes ==
=== Season 1 (2014) ===
No. overall	No. in season	Title	Original release date	U.S. viewers (millions)
1	1	"#welcometoBH"	January 19, 2014	1.08
2	2	"#mansionhunting"	January 20, 2014	0.91
3	3	"#crazyincabo"	January 26, 2014	N/A
4	4	"#yachtlife"	February 9, 2014	0.93
5	5	"#interiormotives"	February 16, 2014	1.12
6	6	"#funemployed"	February 23, 2014	0.98
7	7	"#BHgoesNYC"	March 9, 2014	1.06
8	8	"#selfiesinthecity"	March 16, 2014	N/A
9	9	"#VegasVIP"	March 23, 2014	N/A

=== Season 2 (2014) ===
No. overall	No. in season	Title	Original release date	U.S. viewers (millions)
10	1	"#RichKidsReturn"	August 3, 2014	1.07
11	2	"#ChinaBound"	August 3, 2014	0.91
12	3	"#ShanghaiShowdown"	August 10, 2014	0.87
13	4	"#Instadrama"	August 17, 2014	1.25
14	5	"#Baldeagle"	August 31, 2014	TBA
15	6	"#BabyWhisperer"	September 1, 2014	TBA
16	7	"#Pride&Prada"	September 7, 2014	0.71
17	8	"#TroopBeverlyHills"	September 14, 2014	TBA
18	9	"#SurvivaloftheRichest"	September 21, 2014	TBA
19	10	"#SurgerySelfie"	September 28, 2014	TBA

=== Season 3 (2015) ===
No. overall	No. in season	Title	Original release date
20	1	"#TextGate"	May 24, 2015
21	2	"#BahamaDrama"	May 31, 2015
22	3	"#RingOnIt"	June 7, 2015
23	4	"#NeverHaveIEver"	June 14, 2015
24	5	"#BattleOfTheBod"	June 21, 2015
25	6	"#HaterGonnaHate"	June 28, 2015
26	7	"#LondonBound"	July 5, 2015
27	8	"#PartyCrasher"	July 12, 2015

=== Season 4 (2016) ===
No. overall	No. in season	Title	Original release date
28	1	"#Bridezilla"	May 1, 2016
29	2	"#MaidofDishonor"	May 8, 2016
30	3	"#GossipGirl"	May 15, 2016
31	4	"#WakingUpInVegas"	May 22, 2016
32	5	"#SkeletonsInTheCloset"	May 29, 2016
33	6	"#BadNewsBianca"	June 5, 2016
34	7	"#BacheloretteBlowUp"	June 12, 2016
35	8	"#RunawayBride"	June 19, 2016

== Spin-offs ==
After the first season premiered, it was reported that a spin-off had been ordered by the network titled Rich Kids of New York. Paparazzi photos showed a group of ladies filming in New York City with a production team, however nothing was ever moved forward and aired.

On June 19, 2016, EJNYC premiered on the E! network. The show focused on EJ Johnson and his fashion career in New York City and lasted one season.

== Reception ==
Reviews for the show have been largely negative and the show has been widely panned by critics. Andy Swift of HollywoodLife.com wrote that "the biggest downside to Rich Kids is that it knows how ridiculous it is. The stars are very much aware they’re on a show, and the whole thing couldn’t feel more scripted. Basically, it's gross." Tracie Egan Morrissey of Jezebel.com wrote "Ultimately, though, these people are as boring as they are rich, and not worth watching on television," and "none of the people on the show seem to recognize that their words might have any meaning — probably because they typically don't." Writing for The New York Times, Jon Caramanica wrote "The show is inspired by Rich Kids of Instagram, a Tumblr devoted to gently needling, and maybe gently envying, young people who gleefully show off their wealth on that photo- and video-sharing service. The result is a document of young narcissists relentlessly documenting themselves."

The show has been criticised for promoting materialism and its characters using wealth that they did not earn themselves.

== See also ==
- Rich Kids of Instagram (documentary)
- Rich Kids of Instagram (TV series)
- Rich Kids of the Internet
