= Rich Kids of Instagram (documentary) =

2015 British TV programme

- Inspired by: Rich Kids of Instagram

Production
- Producer: Osca Humphreys

Original release
- Release: 21 December 2015
- Network: Channel 4

The Rich Kids of Instagram is a 2015 British television documentary which aired on Channel 4. First released on 21 December 2015, it was inspired by, but not officially connected to, the Tumblr blog by the same name. Produced and directed by Osca Humphreys, the programme was part of the Cutting Edge documentary series on Channel 4.

The programme follows ultra-wealthy young people as they take selfies and group photos on superyachts and flash stacks of cash, exploring their real lives and motivations. "Rich kids" featured included Lana Scolaro, Clarisse Lafleur, Evan Luthra, and Ezra J. William.

The original broadcast had 1.2 million viewers, nearly one-third of whom were in the age 16 to 34 range.

== Reception ==
A review by Sally Newall in The Independent said, "There were too many subjects and not enough depth. It felt like we weren't getting the whole story, just like in their Insta feeds, really."

== See also ==
- Rich Kids of Beverly Hills
- Rich Kids of Instagram (TV series)
- Rich Kids of the Internet
