= Rich Kids of Instagram (TV series) =

- Inspired by: Rich Kids of Instagram
- No. of seasons: 1
- No. of episodes: 6

Original release
- Release: 4 July – 8 August 2016

Rich Kids of Instagram is a six-episode British reality television series shown on E4 in 2016. Produced by Popkorn TV, it aired between 4 July 2016 and 8 August 2016.

One of the wealthy millennials featured in the series, Russian socialite Julia Stakhiva, was accused by journalist Marina Hyde of The Guardian of fabricating her lifestyle, after it emerged that Stakhiva had rented a spare bedroom in the flat of Hyde's mother-in-law and used other rooms in the flat for filming without permission. The producers of Rich Kids of Instagram re-edited the programme to remove all footage of the Kensington flat, so that it would not appear online or in repeat broadcasts. Stakhiva insisted that she was from a wealthy family, a claim corroborated by Channel 4.

== Reception ==
Critics panned the 2016 television series. Rob Epstein wrote in The i, "If there is a more inconsequential, vacuous waste of airtime than Rich Kids of Instagram, I've yet to see it. There's absolutely no depth, no sense of what insecurities lie behind their insane, inane spending. It's just fast car, fancy watch, vroom-vroom jet ski and rather too many bums in bikini bottoms."

Emma Pryer wrote in the Sunday Mirror, "Some of these creatures you have to feel sorry for – it's a wonder they manage to get themselves up and dressed in their designer gear without having to call the hired help for assistance."

== See also ==
- Rich Kids of Beverly Hills
- Rich Kids of Instagram (documentary)
- Rich Kids of the Internet
