= John J. Pershing Intermediate School 220 =

John J Pershing I.S 220
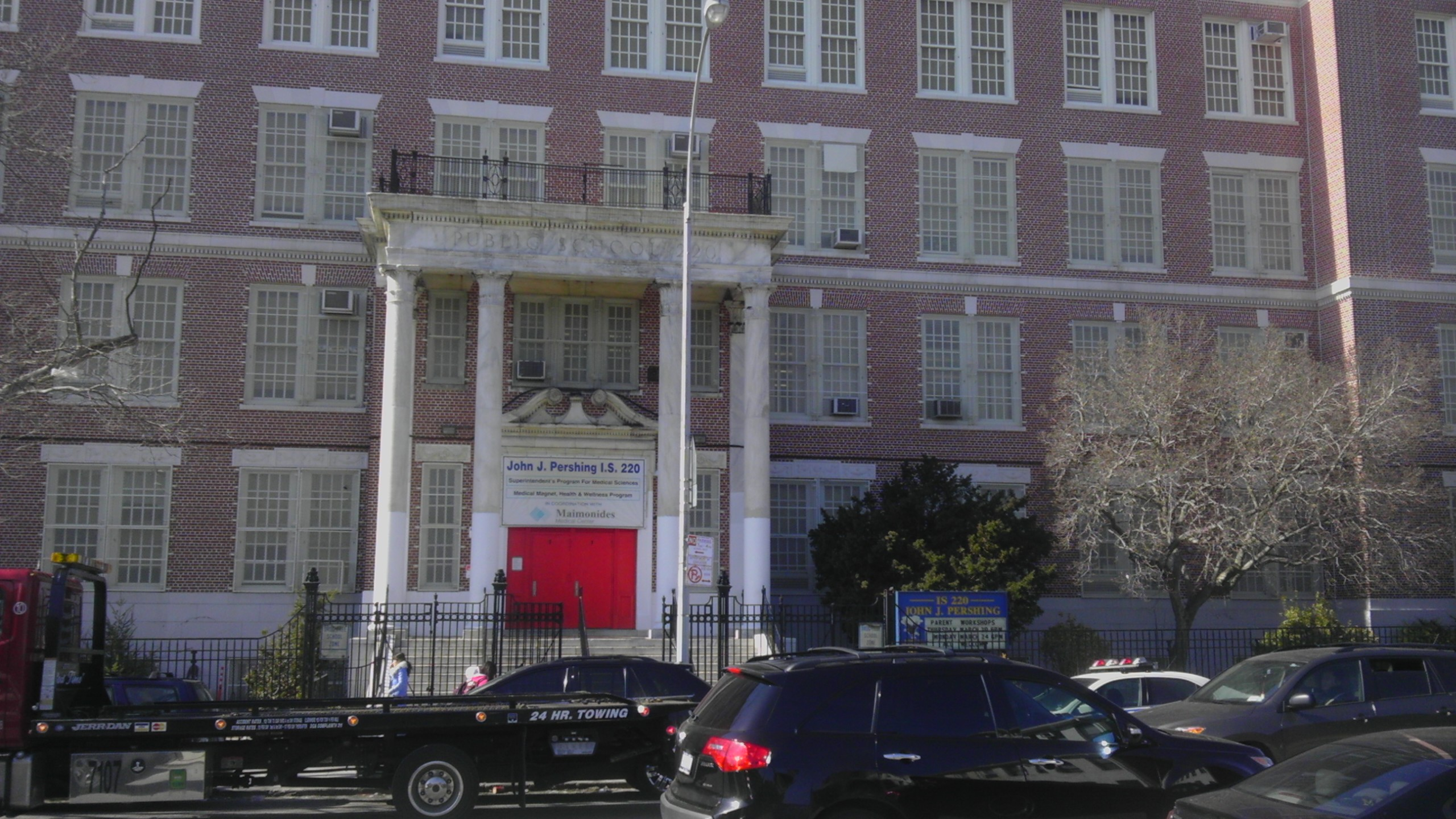

Location
- 4812 9th Avenue Brooklyn, NY 11220; Brooklyn, New York; United States; 40°38′26.83″N 74°0′3.54″W

Information
- Type: Public
- Established: 1930s
- Dean: Steven Lopez
- Principal: Sheldon Dempster
- Grades: 6-8
- Enrollment: 1,292
- Yearbook: The Eagles
- Website: https://www.is220.org/

John J. Pershing Intermediate School 220, is a public middle school located at 4812 Ninth Avenue in the Sunset Park neighborhood of Brooklyn, New York City. It was founded in the 1930s, and was named after World War I general John J. Pershing.

IS 220 is a magnet school for science-oriented education. It is divided into three "mini schools": the Health & Biomedical School, the School for Architecture & Mathematics and the Academy of Environmental Sciences. Top students in the school had been admitted to school such as Stuyvesant High School The Bronx High School of Science; Brooklyn Technical High School; Midwood High School; and Fiorello H. LaGuardia High School

The school's population is 51% Asian, 42% Hispanic, 6% White and 2% Black. A quarter of the Asian population are new immigrants to the United States.

== Superintendent classes ==
Teachers in the school were separated by "mini schools", however teachers who teach superintendent classes have only four classes in the grade. For example, an 8th grade superintendent math teacher will only teach class 801, 802, 803 and 804. Only those in the Superintendent classes, which are also known as the gifted classes, are able to take a foreign language and accelerated courses (Algebra, US History, Spanish II Proficiency, Living Environments (now known as Biology), and Physical Setting (now known as Earth and Space Sciences) (as of September 2024 )

== See also ==
- John J Pershing
- Magnet school
- Intermediate school
- Middle school This school has a gifted & talented program, which they call "honor" classes. They are expected to score higher than 75%, while magnet classes are required only a 65% GPA. Some honor classes have to take Spanish, while the magnet classes don't.
