= Phillip Lim =

American fashion designer

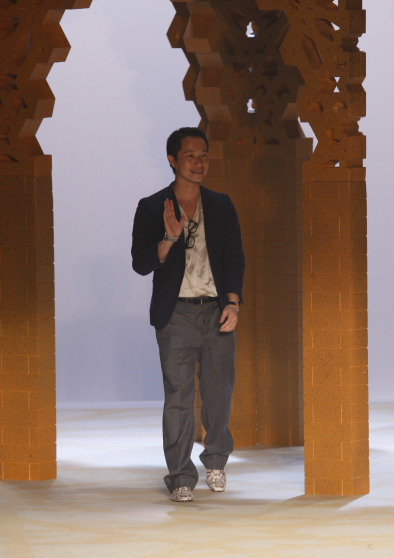
- Phillip Lim in his spring 2009 collection
- Born: Pheng Lim; 16 September 1973 (age 52); Thailand
- Label: 3.1 Phillip Lim

Phillip Lim (born Pheng Lim; September 16, 1973) is an American fashion designer. Lim is of Chinese descent whose parents immigrated to the United States from Cambodia during the Cambodian genocide. Lim co-founded and worked at the Los Angeles-based fashion label Development from 2000 to 2004. In the fall of 2005, he co-founded 3.1 Phillip Lim with friend and business partner Wen Zhou, becoming the company's creative representative.

Lim has garnered both critical and commercial success with his eponymous line. The Council of Fashion Designers of America awarded Lim the 2007 award for Emerging Talent in Womenswear for his work at 3.1 Phillip Lim. In 2012, he was awarded the council's Swarovski award for Menswear.

== 3.1 Phillip Lim ==
3.1 Phillip Lim
- Type: Private
- Industry: Fashion
- Founded: 2004
- Founder: Phillip Lim and Wen Zhou
- Headquarters: New York City
- Key people: Phillip Lim, creative director
- Revenue: US$60 million (projected 2011)
- Website: www.31philliplim.com

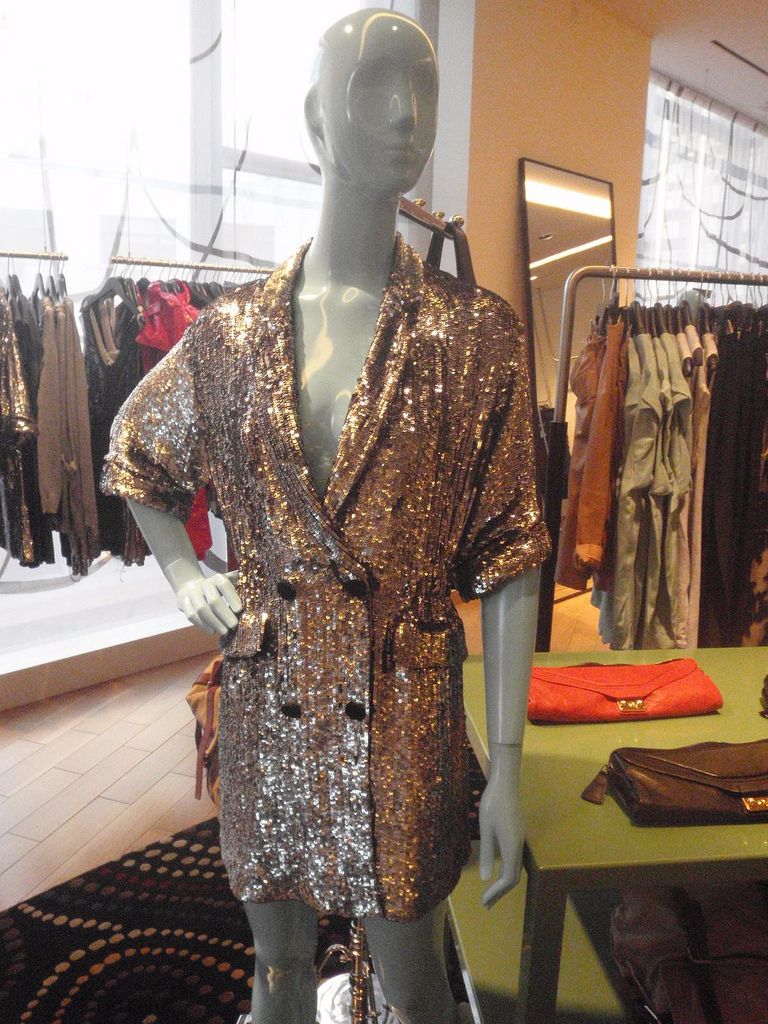
3.1 Phillip Lim gold jacket with black buttons, 2010.

3.1 Phillip Lim is Lim's fashion label.

=== Collections ===
For the line's fall 2006 collection, Lim aimed to "inject some 'street elegance' " into his designs. Laird Borrelli of Vogue praised his work as a "pretty-but-cool clothes" that "don't try too hard".

Lim's spring 2007 collection, His first runway show was praised as "lovely" by Nicole Phelps of Vogue, who said Lim proved himself to be an "accomplished tailor". His clothes were romantic and predominantly white, with occasional navy and floral elements. Phelps noted Lim's "knack for combining the dressy and the casual", saying that "Lim knows how fashionable women want to dress".

The line's fall 2007 collection was inspired by socialite Edith Bouvier Beale and meant to embody what Lim called "pedigree minus prudence". In what Phelps described as Lim's "most ambitious collection by far", Lim showed prep-school plaids and debutante-inspired dresses.

For his Resort 2008 collection, Lim revisited his standby motifs.

His fall 2009 was inspired by the youthquake movement of the 1960s in England. Lissie Trullie's band performed live on his runway.

His spring 2010 fashion show, held on September 16, 2009, as part of the New York Fashion Week, was very well received, Lauren David Peden of Vogue reviewing the clothes as "delightfully modern, exceptionally detailed looks", "enhancing a woman’s femininity without getting all girlie-girl saccharine", and Mark Holgate adding that Lim was "able to martial all the salient ideas of the season into brilliantly effortless, and wonderfully special, pieces". The collection was presented again the following day, at an exclusive runway event for American Express cardholders, the designer explaining that his goal was "to provide Cardmembers insight beyond the traditional runway show and offer them a one-of-a-kind experience into the design process". However, during the show one of the models continuously fell down in her stilettos on both of her trips down the runway, and couldn't get up during the finale until another model picked her up and helped her off the runway. The mishap triggered several articles, and Jessica Coen of New York Magazine's The Cut even stated that "the whole thing was a catastrophe".

For its advertisement campaigns, the brand has repeatedly worked with photographer Viviane Sassen. It operates stores in New York City, Los Angeles, Tokyo, and Seoul.

On November 13, 2024, Lim announced that he was stepping down as creative director of 3.1 Phillip Lim. In September 2025, the brand appointed Michelle Rhee as head of design.

=== Collaborations ===
On September 15, 2013, Lim's collaboration with retail chain Target debuted to select Target stores in the United States of America, and Canada. The fall collection included both women's and men's apparel and accessories ranging in price from $19.99 to $299.99.

Lim initiated a collaboration with scientists, including Charlotte McCurdy, to create fashion accessories and materials from algae and other lab-grown materials.

== Personal life ==
Lim lives in Manhattan. His brother is an attorney in Orange County, California.

== See also ==
- Chinese people in New York City
- LGBT culture in New York City
- List of LGBT people from New York City
- New York Fashion Week
- NYC Pride March
