= Anna Shay =

American television personality (1961–2023)

- アンナ・シェイ
- Shay in 2021
- Born: Anna Erika Shay; January 30, 1961; Tokyo, Japan
- Died: June 1, 2023 (aged 62); Los Angeles, California, U.S.
- Education: Buckley School; University of Southern California
- Occupations: Socialite, businesswoman, television personality
- Years active: 1995–2023
- Television: Bling Empire
- Spouse: Ken Kemp (divorced)
- Children: 1

Anna Erika Shay (January 30, 1961 – June 1, 2023) was an American socialite, businesswoman and television personality. She was a cast member on Netflix's reality television series Bling Empire.

== Early life ==
Anna Erika Shay was born in Tokyo, Japan, on January 30, 1961, as the elder of two children to Edward Shay, an American businessman, and Ai Oizumi Shay, a Japanese-Russian businesswoman who came from Russian aristocracy. Her younger brother was Allen Shay. Her older half-brother from her mother's first marriage was Jun Oizumi.

Shay and her family moved from Japan to Hancock Park, Los Angeles in 1968. Her mother had bought her a pet pocket monkey of an unknown gender from a Japanese department store while she was growing up. She had taken the primate with her on a Pan Am flight to the United States; worried that authorities might not allow her to take her pet, she dressed it in clothes and claimed it to be her sister. Unbeknownst to Shay, her father had arranged everything in advance so the airline attendants allowed the monkey to stay.

Shay graduated from the Buckley School, a private school in Sherman Oaks. She attended the University of Southern California, a private research university in Los Angeles, amongst other colleges.

Shay dedicated her talents to the arts after graduating from college, specifically towards the music and film industry.

Shay was accompanied by security guards in her youth. She had a habit of often evading her guards, resulting in the immediate termination of their employment. Her father had auditioned new employees, testing them specifically to see if they could ensure her absolute safety. Shay doubled her security team and was accompanied at all times after her father's death, including at her vast estate. She had continued her tradition of evading her guards in her later years.

== Career ==
Shay was expected not to work while her parents were still alive. She had once said: "My father really, really never wanted me to have a job." Shay had worked for the Edward A And Ai O Shay Family Foundation since its formation, a non-profit founded by her mother in 2010; focusing on education, arts, performing arts, and music.

Shay was an heiress to Pacific Architects and Engineers (PAE), the leading global defense and government services contractor; which her father founded in September 1955. She, along with her younger brother, Allen - who assumed control of PAE following the death of their father - sold the company to Lockheed Martin on August 16, 2006, in an all-cash $1.2 billion deal.

Shay was a trained licensed contractor.

Shay made her television debut on January 15, 2021, as a cast member on the Netflix reality television series Bling Empire. She was often named a breakout star and quickly became a fan-favorite. When Jeff Jenkins, the show's executive producer, approached her with the opportunity to join the cast, Shay thought she was being asked to help in a behind-the-scenes consultant capacity. She forgot to cash her paycheck from Netflix for the first season. The second season was released on May 13, 2022. The third season was released on October 5, 2022. The series was cancelled on April 19, 2023. She appeared in 22 episodes.

== Charity work ==
Shay had devoted a keen interest in philanthropy. She had previously served as a board member for the George Lopez Foundation; raising awareness about kidney disease and organ donation.

== Personal life ==
Shay was known for keeping her personal life extremely low-profile. Speaking on her privacy, Jeff Jenkins, a friend of hers, once said: "It was held as high value in the family to be private .. She'll tell you the three most important people in her life are her mom and dad and her son. Well, her mom and dad are passed now, so maybe that gives her just a little bit of a feeling of their blessing to share her life." Shay's marriage to Kenneth John Kemp, a third generation firefighter with the LAFD, lasted three years and resulted in the birth of her only son, Kenneth Edward "Kenny" Shay-Kemp, on October 5, 1993. She had raised her son as a single mother after the couple divorced. Her legal name during this marriage was Anna Erika Kemp, later switching back to Shay. BuzzFeed published a special story about her son on February 12, 2015. He was described as the "sole heir to hundreds of millions of dollars and a passionate stoner" who is the owner of a cannabis paraphernalia collection worth half-a-million dollars, which he kept in the basement of her former home in a vault originally designed to be a wine cellar. He made a guest appearance during the fourth episode in the first season of Bling Empire. She had one granddaughter.

Shay had been married and divorced four times. Three of her former husbands were never named and each divorce had been amicable. One of her ex-husbands was from Ireland, with whom she visited Ashford Castle once.

Shay had an estimated net worth of $600 million at the time of her death. A personal assistant had once stolen $3.4 million worth of jewelry, furs, and designer handbags from her home. Her jewelry collection was worth $13.4 million. Her most expensive piece was a platinum lady's 57-carat diamond necklace with an 8.31-carat green emerald - custom made by Vartan's Fine Jewelry in Los Angeles - which estimated to cost $1.4 million. Her collection of 184 designer purses, travel bags, trunks with gold hardware, and wallets were estimated to be worth $1.1 million. She had collected 58 pieces of fine art that estimated to be worth $700k. She had owned a $40k Steinway piano. Her collection of furs were worth an estimated $103k.

Shay purchased a smaller mansion in Beverly Hills, California, for $5.75 million in 2020. Her Sunset Boulevard mansion - which she bought for $9.4 million in 2011 - sold for $13.8 million in 2021. She had also co-owned her childhood home in Tokyo. Prior to the COVID-19 pandemic, she lived in Paris for half of the year.

Shay's date of birth was January 30, 1961, however, the media have consistently reported her birth date to be December 31, 1960.

== Death ==
Shay died from a stroke in Los Angeles, California, on June 1, 2023. She was 62. Her obituary was published by the Los Angeles Times on June 9.

Shay's death was announced to the public on June 5 in a statement by her family to People magazine:

"It saddens our hearts to announce that Anna Shay, a loving mother, grandmother, charismatic star, and our brightest ray of sunshine, has passed away at the early age of 62 from a stroke. Anna taught us many life lessons on how not to take life too seriously and to enjoy the finer things. Her impact on our lives will be forever missed but never forgotten."

Shay's Bling Empire co-stars Cherie Chan, Christine Chiu, Kevin Kreider, Kim Lee, Kane Lim, Kelly Mi Li, Jaime Xie, Guy Tang, Mimi Morris, and Dorothy Wang paid tribute via social media. Jeff Jenkins, the show's executive producer, led the tributes. Golden, Netflix's official social media channel dedicated to celebrating the pan-Asian diaspora, also paid tribute.

== Filmography ==
Year	Title	Notes
2021–2022	Bling Empire	22 episodes
2021	2021 MTV Movie & TV Awards: Unscripted	Co-presenter
2021	Celebrity Family Feud	1 episode
2023	Unstuffed	Film interview
