= Lynn Ban =

Singaporean jewelry designer (1972–2025)

- 万爱萍
- Ban in 2013
- Born: May 27, 1972; Singapore
- Died: January 20, 2025 (aged 52); New York City, U.S.
- Known for: Jewelry design Vintage couture
- Television: Bling Empire: New York
- Spouse: Jett Kain
- Children: 1

Chinese name
- Simplified Chinese: 万爱萍
- Traditional Chinese: 萬愛萍
Transcriptions
Standard Mandarin
- Hanyu Pinyin: Wàn Àipíng
- Website: lynnban.com

Lynn Ban (simplified Chinese: 万爱萍; traditional Chinese: 萬愛萍; May 27, 1972 – January 20, 2025) was a Singaporean jewelry designer who was noted for her unconventional designs. She starred in Bling Empire: New York, a reality show on Netflix. Her clients included Rihanna and Beyoncé. Other musical artists who wore her statement pieces included Billie Eilish, Cardi B, Doja Cat, Kendrick Lamar, Lady Gaga, Madonna, Megan Thee Stallion, Nicki Minaj, Post Malone, and many others.

Vogue described her jewelry collection as "a favorite of pop icons because of its unique rebellious and rock-and-roll vibe", often featuring in fashion shoots to signal "that their wearers were tough, unapologetic, and unafraid of the world". Recurring motifs in her edgy jewelry pieces included ancient armor, beetles, bullets, crosses, handcuffs, razors, thorns, and sickle blades.

== Early life and education ==
Born in Singapore, Lynn Ban first moved to the United States at age 4. At the time, her father David Ban was a banker at Chase Manhattan Bank. Her mother Patricia Ban was a former secretary. She also had a younger sister. Their family moved every few years and lived in cities around the world, returning to Singapore briefly when Lynn was in her teens.

Ban credited her mother, a certified gemologist, for nurturing her interest in fashion from a young age with shopping trips to Bloomingdale's and Club 21. She studied art history and literature at the Gallatin School of Individualized Study at New York University, and went on to study French literature and art history at Cornell University. She also spent two years at Sorbonne University in Paris.

After graduating, Ban opened a Genki Sushi franchise in midtown Manhattan with Jett Kain as her business partner in 1998. It was the chain's first foray in to the United States; her father had launched Genki Sushi in Singapore and Hong Kong. During this period in the late 1990s, she was a collector of both vintage and contemporary fashion for her personal library. She sold the New York restaurant franchise after the 2001 World Trade Center attack.

== Career ==
Ban started her professional career in fashion as a curator of vintage couture for Barneys New York. In 2002, she launched Lynn Ban Vintage at Barneys, selling vintage fashions from Chanel, Valentino, and Yves Saint Laurent. She also did pop-ups of Lynn Ban Vintage at Harvey Nichols in London, as well as Celux, a private members' club in the Louis Vuitton Building in Tokyo.

=== Lynn Ban Jewelry ===
In 2011, Lynn Ban launched her eponymous jewelry line. Her first collection was distributed by Barneys, Dover Street Market, Matches Fashion, Maxfield, and Net-a-Porter. Retailer Club 21 in Singapore started stocking her jewelry pieces in 2012. One of her most iconic pieces included the sculpted silver Armor ring, worn stacked to resemble armor. Another signature piece was her Gash cuff made of black rhodium with diamonds embedded to resemble a jagged wound.

Her big break was when pop star Rihanna wore a cuff designed by Ban while performing on American Idol in 2012. Rihanna became a celebrity champion for Ban's jewelry, and was often spotted wearing her pieces in music videos, on tour, and in public appearances. Commissioned to create jewelry for Rihanna to wear in her W magazine photo shoot in 2016, Ban designed a claw armor ring that she compared to a weapon, in keeping with the issue's "baddest bitch of the post-apocalypse" theme.

Ban collaborated with her on custom jewelry for Rihanna's Fenty x Puma collection, which debuted in 2016. In February 2018, The Adventurine called out Fenty x Puma for "the coolest jewelry" at New York Fashion Week, noting Rihanna's collaboration with Ban on "the collection of big, bold colorful baubles, that also maintained a sporty vibe". They became close, with Rihanna referring to Ban as her "fairy godmother". When asked what type of woman inspired her, Ban cited Rihanna, saying, "She's my type: empowered, strong, and dangerous."

Ban's jewelry featured in Beyoncé's 2013 visual album, Beyoncé. Memorable pieces designed by Ban included the stacked rings worn in "Haunted" and "Superpower". Beyoncé wore Ban again in the videos for the singles "Formation" (2016) and "Spirit" (2018).

Ban debuted a line of handbags in 2018. One of the first handbags was a limited-edition evening minaudière featuring a heavy gold bullion bar and doubling as a necklace. Another miniaudière in the line was described by Ban as a "Swarovski crystal-encrusted Ziggy lightning bolt".

During the global COVID-19 pandemic, she scaled back her jewelry business to focus only on private clients, and planned to relaunch it following Bling Empire: New York.

=== Bling Empire: New York ===
In 2021, Ban was approached by producer Jeff Jenkins to appear in Bling Empire: New York, a spin-off of the Netflix hit reality TV series Bling Empire. She agreed to join the cast, which included fashion stylist and influencer Tina Leung. Initially cautious, she told Women's Wear Daily that she took the opportunity to "represent Asian career women" and counter the "stereotype of Crazy Rich Asians".

Shooting took place between January and March 2022, with cameras filming Ban's every move. During the series, she dressed in dramatic designer ensembles, exclusively from her extensive personal collection of couture. Ban made her television debut wearing a "spectacular" black leather dress covered in long spiky needles, created by Noir Key Ninomiya.

The show also featured footage of Ban's debut party for her ready-to-wear resort collection, featuring clothing made by local artisans in Bali. The collection was a partnership with COMO Hotels and Resorts, which carried the line at 12 resort shops in locations such as Bali, The Maldives, Parrot Cay, and Phuket.

== Personal life and death ==
Ban was married to Jett Kain, a former MTV producer and creator of the first VH1 Fashion and Music Awards, who was her business partner. They had a son. She lived in Tribeca in Manhattan.

Ban was in a skiing accident in the Aspen Highlands on December 24, 2024, and underwent an emergency craniotomy after a CT scan revealed a brain bleed. On December 30, 2024, she shared photos of herself in the hospital on Instagram, explaining that she had "face planted" on a ski slope while wearing a helmet, and wrote, "And in the blink of an eye ... life can change."

According to an Instagram post by her son three weeks later, Ban died on January 20, 2025. Her husband found her unconscious and unresponsive that afternoon at their home in New York City. She was 52 years old.
