= Bling Empire =

American reality television series on Netflix

- Genre: Reality television
- Starring: Cherie Chan; Christine Chiu; Kevin Kreider; Kim Lee; Kane Lim; Kelly Mi Li; Anna Shay; Jaime Xie; Mimi Morris; Dorothy Wang
- Country of origin: United States
- Original language: English
- No. of seasons: 3
- No. of episodes: 26

Production
- Executive producers: Jeff Jenkins; Brandon Panaligan; Ross Weintraub; Elise Chung; Ben Eisele; Kelly Mi Li; Christine Chiu
- Running time: 28–47 minutes
- Production company: Jeff Jenkins Productions

Original release
- Network: Netflix
- Release: January 15, 2021 – October 5, 2022

Related
- Bling Empire: New York

Bling Empire is an American reality television series released on Netflix on January 15, 2021. The series focuses on the lives of wealthy, materialistic East and Southeast Asian Americans, socialites based in the Los Angeles area, described as the real-life Crazy Rich Asians. It is the first American reality television series in which the main cast are all of East and Southeast Asian descent.

On March 10, 2021, Netflix renewed the series for a second season which premiered on May 13, 2022. The third season premiered on October 5, 2022. The sister Netflix series, Bling Empire: New York, launched in January 2023. In April 2023, it was reported that Netflix decided to not go forward with the fourth season of this series and second season of the spin-off Bling Empire: New York.

== Cast ==
=== Main ===
- Cherie Chan: Denim heiress and former singer. Engaged to Jessey, mother of Jadore and Jevon Chan quit the series at the end of the second season due to a controversy within the cast
- Christine Chiu: Born in Taiwan, co-founder of Beverly Hills Plastic Surgery inc., philanthropist, and couture collector. Married to Gabriel, mother of 'Baby G'
- Kevin Kreider: Born in South Korea but adopted and raised in Philadelphia, male model
- Kim Lee: Raised by her Vietnamese mother, but searches for her father in season one, a DJ and former model
- Kane Lim: Born in Singapore, a real estate developer, and investor with family interests in real estate, shipping, oil, and tankers
- Kelly Mi Li: Born in China, a self-made entrepreneur, and film producer
- Anna Shay: Part-Japanese, part-Russian socialite, whose fortune came from selling her father's company Pacific Architects and Engineers. Mother of Kenny
- Jaime Xie: A fashion influencer and model. The eldest daughter of Chinese-American billionaire businessmen Ken Xie
- Mimi Morris (season 2): Born in Vietnam. Married to Don
- Dorothy Wang (season 2): The youngest daughter of Chinese-American businessman Roger Wang

=== Recurring ===
- Gabriel Chiu: Co-founder and plastic surgeon at Beverly Hills Plastic Surgery inc., who claims to be a 24th direct descendant of the Song emperor. Married to Christine, father of 'Baby G'
- Andrew Gray: Male model and an actor, who is best known for playing the Red Ranger in Power Rangers Megaforce. Makes a guest appearance during the last episode in the second season and the first episode in the final season
- Jessey Lee: Family business is in furniture. Engaged to Cherie, father of Jadore and Jevon. Lee quit the series at the end of the second series due to a controversy within the cast
- Guy Tang: Hairdresser and singer-songwriter. Married to Almar

== Episodes ==
=== Series overview ===
Season	Episodes	Originally released
1	8	January 15, 2021
2	8	May 13, 2022
3	10	October 5, 2022

=== Season 1 (2021) ===
No. overall	No. in season	Title	Original release date
1	1	"Necklacegate 90210"	January 15, 2021
2	2	"Tale of Two Trusts"	January 15, 2021
3	3	"What's in Anna's Shower?"	January 15, 2021
4	4	"Beverly Hills Heartbreak"	January 15, 2021
5	5	"Private Lies"	January 15, 2021
6	6	"The Other Side"	January 15, 2021
7	7	"Kevin and Kane Take Charleston"	January 15, 2021
8	8	"Will You Marry Me?"	January 15, 2021

=== Season 2 (2022) ===
No. overall	No. in season	Title	Original release date
9	1	"Diamonds And Deception"	May 13, 2022
10	2	"Rumor Has It"	May 13, 2022
11	3	"Adieu ma Chérie"	May 13, 2022
12	4	"No Friend Zone"	May 13, 2022
13	5	"From Glowup to Blowup"	May 13, 2022
14	6	"Royalty Over Loyalty"	May 13, 2022
15	7	"The Truth Hurts"	May 13, 2022
16	8	"Battle Royale"	May 13, 2022

=== Season 3 (2022) ===
No. overall	No. in season	Title	Original release date
17	1	"Blast From the Past"	October 5, 2022
18	2	"Gossip Guy"	October 5, 2022
19	3	"Envy, Intrigue, and Escapes"	October 5, 2022
20	4	"Making Up in Malibu"	October 5, 2022
21	5	"There's Something About Janice"	October 5, 2022
22	6	"Achy Reiki Heart"	October 5, 2022
23	7	"Crash and Burn"	October 5, 2022
24	8	"The Truth About Kim"	October 5, 2022
25	9	"Kevin in Paris"	October 5, 2022
26	10	"The One That Got Away"	October 5, 2022

== Reception ==
For the first season, review aggregator Rotten Tomatoes reported an approval rating of 91% based on 11 reviews, with an average rating of 6.7/10. The website's critics consensus reads, "Bling Empire may be another celebration of lavish wealth, but the focus on an Asian American cast gives this reality program an intriguing layer of cultural celebration."

Diane Gordon of TV Guide thought the television series was more than the "grotesque opulence" that it depicted, with compelling characters among the cast, some of whom were exploring their identity. Eilidh Hargreaves of The Telegraph found the "epic rivalries", "ridiculous" problems, wild whims, "self-serving" philosophy of the main characters to be compulsive viewing and "deliciously odious to observe".

== Spin-off ==
In October 2022, Netflix announced a New York City-set spin-off series Bling Empire: New York. It stars Dorothy Wang, who was a cast member in season 2 of the original series, Tina Leung, Deborah Hung, Stephen Hung, and Lynn Ban. The spin-off was released on January 20, 2023.

== See also ==
- Singapore Social
- House of Ho
- Dubai Bling
- Desi Bling
