= NetScreen Technologies =

American technology company that was acquired by Juniper Networks

- Type: Division
- Industry: IT security, Computer software, Computer hardware
- Founded: 1997
- Defunct: 2004
- Fate: Acquired by Juniper Networks
- Headquarters: Sunnyvale, CA., United States
- Key people: Ken Xie, CTO, CEO, and Co-Founder, Yan Ke, Co-Founder, Feng Deng, Co-Founder, Robert Thomas, CEO, Anson Chen, VP R&D, Nir Zuk, CTO
- Products: Network security and access solutions and appliances.
- Parent: Juniper Networks
- Website: www.juniper.net

NetScreen Technologies was an American technology company that was acquired by Juniper Networks for US$4 billion stock in 2004.

NetScreen Technologies developed ASIC-based Internet security systems and appliances that delivered high performance firewall, VPN and traffic shaping functionality to Internet data centers, e-business sites, broadband service providers and application service providers. NetScreen was the first firewall manufacturer to develop a gigabit-speed firewall, the NetScreen-1000.

== History ==
NetScreen Technologies was founded by Yan Ke, Ken Xie, and Feng Deng. Ken Xie, Chief Technology Officer and co-founder was also the CEO until Robert Thomas joined in 1998.

Robert Thomas, NetScreen's president and chief executive officer, came to NetScreen in 1998 from Sun Microsystems, where he was General Manager of Intercontinental Operations for Sun's software business, which includes security, networking, and Internet tools.

Ken Xie left NetScreen in 2000 to found Fortinet, a competing ASIC-based firewall company.

NetScreen acquired its core IPS technology through the purchase of OneSecure, Inc. for US$45 million in stock in 2002. OneSecure was created by Rakesh Loonkar (subsequently the co-founder of Trusteer), and Israeli engineer Nir Zuk, who had been one of Check Point Software’s first employees.

In 2003, NetScreen hired Anson Chen as its vice president of research and development. Anson Chen, a 12-year veteran of Cisco Systems, Inc. and former vice president and general manager of the Network Management and Services Technology Group, led engineering, research and development efforts for NetScreen's entire product line, including its firewall, IPSec virtual private network (VPN) and intrusion detection and prevention technologies. Chen also had functional management responsibility for NetScreen's secure access products.

== 2015 "unauthorized code" incident ==
Analysis of the firmware code in 2015 showed that a backdoor key could exist using Dual_EC_DRBG. This would enable whoever held that key to passively decrypt traffic encrypted by ScreenOS.

In December 2015, Juniper Systems announced that it had discovered "unauthorized code" in the ScreenOS software that underlies its NetScreen devices, present from 2012 onwards. There were two vulnerabilities: One was a simple root password backdoor, and the other one was changing a point in Dual_EC_DRBG so that the attackers presumably had the key to use the pre-existing (intentional or unintentional) kleptographic backdoor in ScreenOS to passively decrypt traffic.
