= COMO Hotels and Resorts =

Singapore-based hotel company

- Company type: Private Limited company
- Industry: Hospitality
- Founded: 1991
- Founder: Christina Ong
- Headquarters: Singapore
- Number of locations: 18 (2024)
- Area served: Worldwide
- Key people: Olivier Jolivet (CEO)
- Services: Hotels, Spas

COMO Hotels and Resorts is a Singapore-based company that operates hotels in Australia, Bhutan, France, Indonesia, Italy, the Maldives, Thailand, Turks and Caicos, the United Kingdom and the United States. The company was founded by Christina Ong in 1991.

== History ==
The company was founded in 1991 by Christina Ong and her husband Ong Beng Seng. The company commenced operations with the opening of The Halkin hotel in London, England in 1991. This was followed by the opening of Parrot Cay resort in Turks and Caicos in 1998, and the Cocoa Island resort in the Maldives in 2002. In 2004, the company acquired and assumed management over the Begawan Giri Estate in Ubud, Bali.

Subsidiary company COMO Shambhala introduced a wellness app and website in June 2020.

The group's Parrot Cay resort was named the location of numerous celebrity death hoaxes, including hoaxes on the supposed deaths of Ted Nugent, Ja Rule, Chad Kroeger and Vince Vaughn.

In 2018, the company acquired Castello Del Nero, historic Tuscan castle-turned-hotel, in a deal worth €39.6 million. The property reopened in 2019 as COMO Castello Del Nero following extensive restorations led by Milanese designer Paola Navone.

== Properties ==
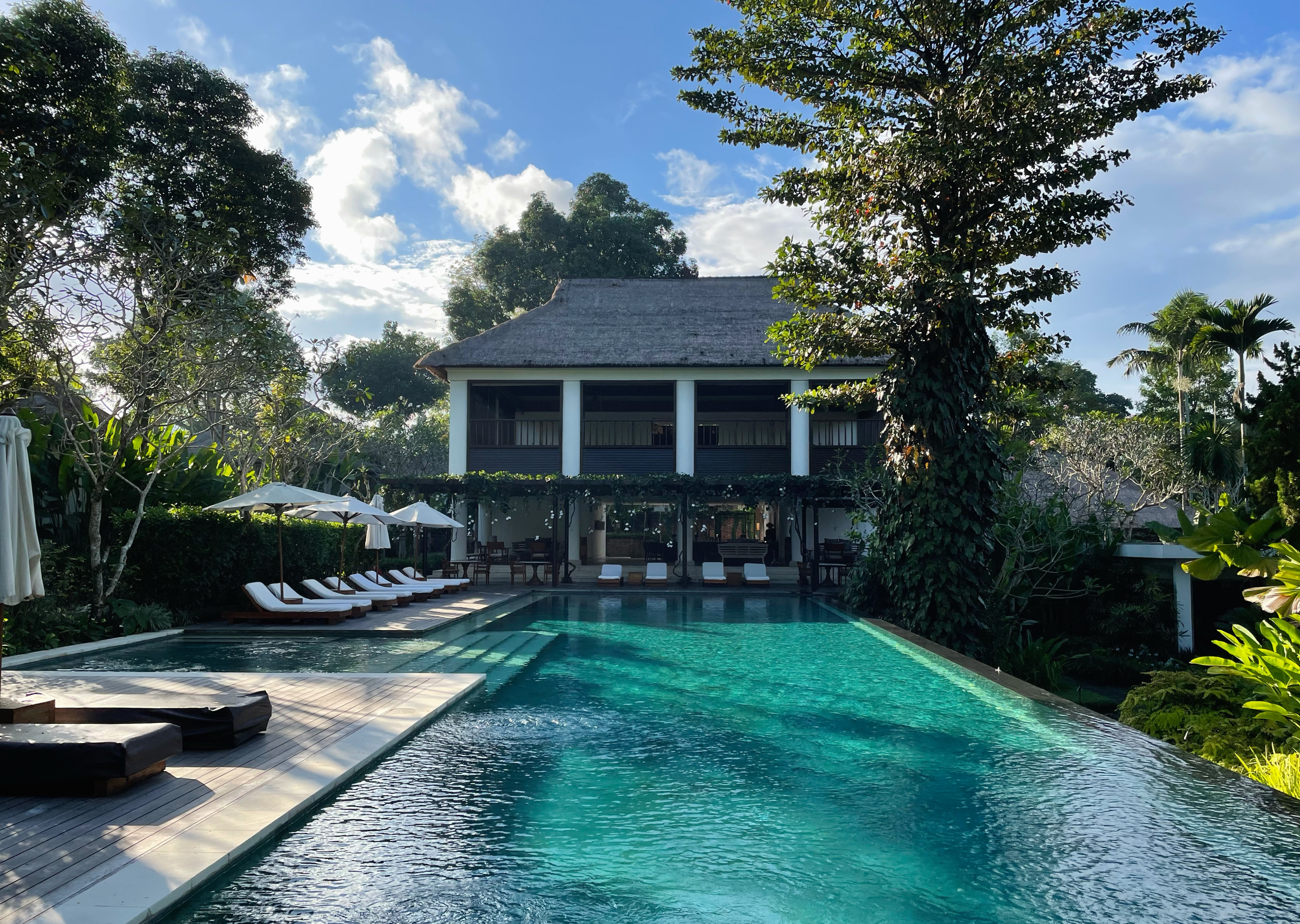
COMO Uma Ubud, Bali, Indonesia

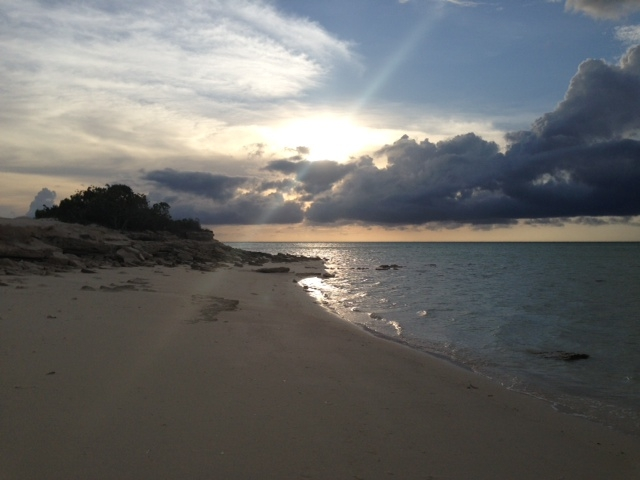
Parrot Cay Island

As of July 2021, COMO Hotels and Resorts operates 18 hotels in nine countries in Asia, Europe, North America, and Oceania. COMO Shambhala Estate in Ubud, Bali is the group's flagship.

Asia-Pacific

- COMO Uma Paro, Bhutan
- COMO Uma Punakha, Bhutan
- COMO Shambhala Estate, Bali, Indonesia
- COMO Uma Canggu, Bali, Indonesia
- COMO Uma Ubud, Bali, Indonesia
- COMO Cocoa Island, Maldives
- COMO Maalifushi, Maldives
- COMO Metropolitan Bangkok, Thailand
- COMO Point Yamu Phuket, Thailand
- COMO Metropolitan Singapore

Australia/Oceania

- COMO The Treasury, Perth, Australia
- COMO Laucala Island, Fiji

Europe

- COMO Castello del Nero, Italy
- COMO Alpina Dolomites, Italy
- COMO Le Montrachet, Burgundy, France
- COMO The Halkin London, United Kingdom
- COMO Metropolitan London, United Kingdom

North America

- COMO Parrot Cay, Turks and Caicos
