= 2021 MTV Movie & TV Awards =

American awards show

- Date: May 16, 2021; May 17, 2021
- Location: Hollywood Palladium, Los Angeles, California
- Country: United States
- Hosted by: Leslie Jones (May 16, Scripted); Nikki Glaser (May 17, Unscripted)

Highlights
- Most awards: WandaVision (4)
- Most nominations: WandaVision (6)

Television/radio coverage
- Network: MTV
- Produced by: Bruce Gillmer; Den of Thieves
- Directed by: Ryan Polito

The 2021 MTV Movie & TV Awards were an awards presentation held on May 16 and 17, 2021 at the Hollywood Palladium in Los Angeles. It was the 29th edition of the MTV Movie & TV Awards, and the fourth to jointly honor movies and television.

The presentation was held as a two-night event; comedian and actress Leslie Jones hosted the first night, which was dedicated to awards for film and scripted television. Comedian Nikki Glaser hosted the second night, MTV Movie & TV Awards: Unscripted, which were devoted to awards for reality television.

== Winners and nominees ==
The full list of nominees was announced on April 19, 2021. Best Music Documentary nominees were announced on May 10, 2021, followed by Best Musical Moment on May 11, 2021. All winners are listed first, in bold.

=== Scripted Awards ===
Best Movie	Best Show
**To All the Boys: Always and Forever**; Borat Subsequent Moviefilm; Judas and the Black Messiah; Promising Young Woman; Soul	**WandaVision**; The Boys; Bridgerton; Cobra Kai; Emily in Paris
Best Performance in a Movie	Best Performance in a Show
**Chadwick Boseman – Ma Rainey's Black Bottom**; Sacha Baron Cohen – The Trial of the Chicago 7; Daniel Kaluuya – Judas and the Black Messiah; Carey Mulligan – Promising Young Woman; Zendaya – Malcolm & Marie	**Elizabeth Olsen – WandaVision**; Michaela Coel – I May Destroy You; Emma Corrin – The Crown; Elliot Page – The Umbrella Academy; Anya Taylor-Joy – The Queen's Gambit
Best Comedic Performance	Best Hero
**Leslie Jones – Coming 2 America**; Eric Andre – Bad Trip; Annie Murphy – Schitt's Creek; Issa Rae – Insecure; Jason Sudeikis – Ted Lasso	**Anthony Mackie – The Falcon and the Winter Soldier**; Gal Gadot – Wonder Woman 1984; Pedro Pascal – The Mandalorian; Teyonah Parris – WandaVision; Jack Quaid – The Boys
Best Villain	Best Kiss
**Kathryn Hahn – WandaVision**; Aya Cash – The Boys; Giancarlo Esposito – The Mandalorian; Nicholas Hoult – The Great; Ewan McGregor – Birds of Prey	**Chase Stokes and Madelyn Cline – Outer Banks**; Jodie Comer and Sandra Oh – Killing Eve; Lily Collins and Lucas Bravo – Emily in Paris; Maitreyi Ramakrishnan and Jaren Lewison – Never Have I Ever; Regé-Jean Page and Phoebe Dynevor – Bridgerton
Most Frightened Performance	Best Fight
**Victoria Pedretti – The Haunting of Bly Manor**; Simona Brown – Behind Her Eyes; Elisabeth Moss – The Invisible Man; Jurnee Smollett – Lovecraft Country; Vince Vaughn – Freaky	**"Wanda vs. Agatha" – WandaVision**; "Final Funhouse Fight" – Birds of Prey; "Starlight, Queen Maeve, Kimiko vs. Stormfront" – The Boys; "Finale House Fight" – Cobra Kai; "Final Fight vs. Steppenwolf" – Zack Snyder's Justice League
Best Breakthrough Performance	Best Duo
**Regé-Jean Page – Bridgerton**; Maria Bakalova – Borat Subsequent Moviefilm; Antonia Gentry – Ginny & Georgia; Paul Mescal – Normal People; Ashley Park – Emily in Paris	**Falcon and the Winter Soldier – The Falcon and the Winter Soldier**; Barb and Star – Barb and Star Go To Vista Del Mar; Borat and Tutar Sagdiyev – Borat Subsequent Moviefilm; Din Djarin and Grogu – The Mandalorian; Emily Cooper and Mindy Chen – Emily in Paris
Best Musical Moment
**"Edge of Great" – Julie and the Phantoms**; "Brown Skin Girl" – Black is King; "Wildest Dreams" – Bridgerton; "I Wanna Rock" – Cobra Kai; "Stand by Me" - Love and Monsters; "Lost in the Wild" – The Kissing Booth 2; "Beginning, Middle, End" – To All the Boys: Always and Forever; "Agatha All Along" - WandaVision

=== Unscripted Awards ===
Best Music Documentary	Best Docu-Reality Show
**BTS – Break the Silence: The Movie**; Ariana Grande: Excuse Me, I Love You; Framing Britney Spears; The Bee Gees: How Can You Mend a Broken Heart; Biggie: I Got a Story to Tell; Billie Eilish: The World's a Little Blurry; Demi Lovato: Dancing with the Devil; Tina; Shawn Mendes: In Wonder; Taylor Swift: Miss Americana	**Jersey Shore: Family Vacation**; Below Deck Mediterranean; Black Ink Crew: New York; Bling Empire; Love & Hip Hop: Atlanta
Best Dating Show	Best Reality Cast
**The Bachelorette**; 90 Day Fiancé; Ex on the Beach; Love Is Blind; Ready to Love	**RuPaul's Drag Race**; 90 Day Fiancé; Jersey Shore: Family Vacation; Love & Hip Hop: Atlanta; The Real Housewives of Atlanta
Best Competition Series	Best Lifestyle Show
**RuPaul's Drag Race**; The Circle; The Challenge; Legendary; The Masked Singer	**Nailed It!**; Deliciousness; Fixer Upper: Welcome Home; Making the Cut; Queer Eye
Best New Unscripted Series	Best Talk/Topical Show
**Selena + Chef**; Bling Empire; Cardi Tries; The Real Housewives of Salt Lake City; VH1 Family Reunion: Love & Hip Hop Edition	**The Daily Show with Trevor Noah**; The Breakfast Club; A Little Late with Lilly Singh; Red Table Talk; Watch What Happens Live with Andy Cohen
Best Comedy/Game Show	Best Host
**Impractical Jokers**; Floor is Lava; Kids Say the Darndest Things; Ridiculousness; Wild 'n Out	**RuPaul – RuPaul's Drag Race**; Nicole Byer – Nailed It!; Rob Dyrdek – Ridiculousness; Tiffany Haddish – Kids Say the Darndest Things; T. J. Lavin – The Challenge
Breakthrough Social Star	Best Real-Life Mystery or Crime Series
**Bretman Rock**; Addison Rae; Jalaiah Harmon; Charli D'Amelio; Rickey Thompson	**Catfish: The TV Show**; Evil Lives Here; Night Stalker: The Hunt for a Serial Killer; Tiger King; Unsolved Mysteries
Best Fight	Best International Reality Series
**"Kourtney Kardashian vs. Kim Kardashian West" – Keeping Up With The Kardashians**; "Chrishell Stause vs. Christine Quinn" — Selling Sunset; "Jackie Goldschneider vs. Teresa Giudice" – The Real Housewives of New Jersey; "Kandy Muse vs. Tamisha Iman" – RuPaul's Drag Race: Untucked; "Law Roach vs. Guest Judge Dominique Jackson" – Legendary	**Love Island** **(UK)**; Acapulco Shore; Geordie Shore; Nailed It! (Mexico); RuPaul's Drag Race UK

=== Comedic Genius Award ===
- Sacha Baron Cohen

=== MTV Generation Award ===
- Scarlett Johansson

=== MTV Reality Royalty Lifetime Achievement ===
- Jersey Shore: Family Vacation

== Multiple nominations ==
=== Film ===
The following movies received multiple nominations:

- Three – Borat Subsequent Moviefilm
- Two – Birds of Prey, Judas and the Black Messiah, Promising Young Woman, To All the Boys: Always and Forever

=== Television ===
The following television series received multiple nominations:

- Six – WandaVision
- Four – The Boys, Bridgerton
- Three – Cobra Kai, Emily in Paris, RuPaul's Drag Race, The Mandalorian
- Two – 90 Day Fiancé, Jersey Shore: Family Vacation, Kids Say the Darndest Things, Legendary, Love & Hip Hop: Atlanta, Nailed It!, Ridiculousness, The Challenge, The Falcon and the Winter Soldier

== Appearances and Presenters ==
=== Scripted ===
- Mandy Moore and Justin Hartley – presented Best Hero
- Lin-Manuel Miranda, Anthony Ramos, Corey Hawkins, Leslie Grace and Melissa Barrera – introduced In the Heights preview
- Yvonne Orji and Eric Andre – presented Best Performance in a Show
- Jurnee Smollett – presented Best Breakthrough Performance
- Billy Porter – honoured Scarlett Johansson with the Generation Award
- Scarlett Johansson – introduced Black Widow preview
- Addison Rae and Tanner Buchanan – presented Best Kiss
- Nasim Pedrad – presented Comedic Performance
- Jacob Elordi - presented Best Fight
- Riley Keough and Taylour Paige – presenter Best Duo
- Tom Hiddleston – introduced Loki preview
- Seth Rogen – honoured Sacha Baron Cohen with the Comedic Genius Award
- Chase Stokes, Madelyn Cline, Madison Bailey, Jonathan Daviss and Rudy Pankow – presented Best Villain
- Anthony Mackie – presented Most Frightened Performance
- Patrick Wilson and Vera Farmiga – introduced The Conjuring: The Devil Made Me Do It preview
- Antonia Gentry – presented Best Musical Moment
- Yara Shahidi – presented Best Performance in a Movie
- Ralph Macchio and William Zabka – presented Best Movie
- Henry Golding - introduced Snake Eyes preview
- Leslie Jones - presented Best Show

=== Unscripted ===
- Heidi Klum and Winnie Harlow – presented Best Reality Cast
- Ray J and Princess Love – presenter Best Dating Show
- Nikki Bella and Brie Bella – presented Best Fight
- Paris Hilton – honoured Jersey Shore cast with Reality Royalty Award
- Tayshia Adams – presented Best Talk/Topical Show
- The D'Amelio Family – introduced "Meet the D'Amelio's" preview and presented Best Host
- Bretman Rock – presented Best New Unscripted Series
- Erika Jayne, Gottmik and Symone – presented Breakthrough Social Star
- Chrishell Stause, Mary Fitzgerald and Heather Young – presented Best Lifestyle Show
- Christine Chiu and Anna Shay – presented Best Competition Series
- Christine Quinn – presented Best Comedy/Game Show
- Kyle Richards – presented Docu-Best Reality Show

== Ceremony information ==
MTV did not announce or hold a 2020 edition of the ceremony due to the COVID-19 pandemic. MTV announced on March 11, 2021, that the ceremony would be scheduled for May 16 and 17, 2021, with the first night to focus on films and scripted television, and the second (titled MTV Movie & TV Awards: Unscripted) to focus on unscripted and reality television.
