= Jaime Xie =

American businesswoman (born 1997)

- Born: November 9, 1997 (age 28); San Francisco Bay Area, California, U.S.
- Occupations: Social media personality and model
- Years active: 2012-present
- Known for: Bling Empire
- Father: Ken Xie

Jaime Xie is an American businesswoman, model, socialite, and social media personality. She starred on the Netflix television series Bling Empire in 2021 to 2022.

== Early life ==
Jaime Xie is the eldest child of Ken Xie, the billionaire founder and CEO of Silicon Valley–based cybersecurity company Fortinet. He was also a collaborator, early investor, and consultant to Zoom founder and CEO, Eric Yuan. Ken Xie was on the Forbes 400 List in 2020 and has an estimated net worth of $4.2 billion. Xie was born in the Bay Area and grew up as a competitive equestrian, riding with equestrians such as Eve Jobs, daughter of Steve Jobs. She was ranked #1 in the United States in 2014 with her horse, Comissario, winning the USEF Horse of the Year Award that same year.

== Career ==
=== Equestrianism ===
Xie began competitive horseback riding during the early years of her primary school life, dreaming to become an equestrian champion, and traveling throughout the nation. She won many competitions throughout her career, notably placing first at the United States Equestrian Federation (USEF) competition in the small junior hunter 16-17 division. At age 20, Xie decided to retire from competitions to pursue a career in the fashion industry.

=== Fashion ===
Xie attended her first fashion week at the age of 17. She was accepted into the Parsons School of Design but chose to attend the Fashion Institute of Design and Merchandising in Los Angeles. She dropped out after one year to focus on growing her personal brand. She started her own website, Jaimexie.com, and has over half a million followers on Instagram. Xie has worked with Tiffany & Co., Piaget, Farfetch, Luisaviaroma, Selfridges, SSENSE, The Webster, Jimmy Choo, Tom Ford Beauty, Valentino Beauty, Guerlain, Sephora, and La Prairie.

=== Bling Empire ===
On January 15, 2021, Bling Empire premiered on Netflix, with Xie starring alongside Cherie Chan, Christine Chiu, Kevin Kreider, Kim Lee, Kane Lim, Kelly Mi Li, Anna Shay, Mimi Morris, and Dorothy Wang. The second season premiered on May 13, 2022, and the third season premiered on October 5, 2022.
