= Halkin Street =

Street in Belgravia, London

Coordinates: 51°30′2.24″N 0°9′9.25″W

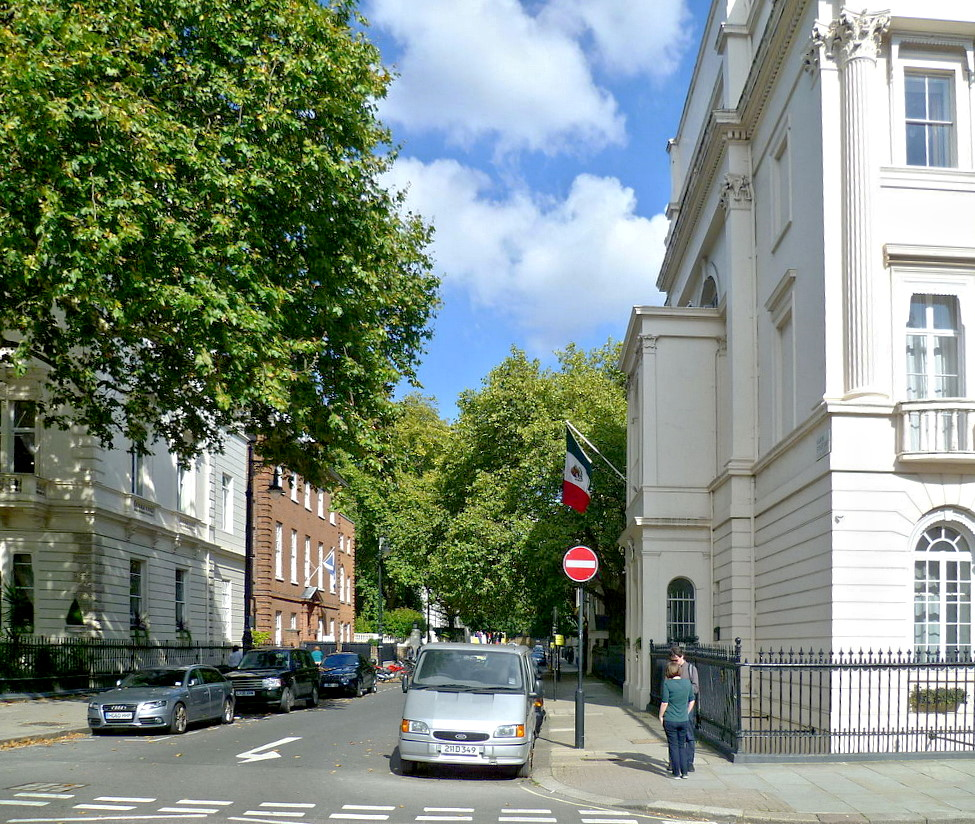
Halkin Street, from Belgrave Square

Residence of the Mexican Ambassador

Halkin Street is a street in the Belgravia district of London, England. The street runs south-west to north-east, from the north-east corner of Belgrave Square over to Grosvenor Place.

== Buildings ==
Significant buildings include Forbes House, a Grade II listed detached mansion at No. 10, which was built in the early to mid 19th century.

The 5-star Halkin Hotel is at No. 5–6, and the Caledonian Club is at No. 9.

The street is also home to the Ambassador's Residence of the Mexican Embassy. The main entrance is on Halkin Street but displays its address as 48 Belgrave Square, and there is an annex building located at No. 8 Halkin Street.

== Notable residents ==
- Bernard Cornfeld (1927–1995), the international financier, lived at No. 1.
