= The Halkin =

Hotel in London

COMO The Halkin
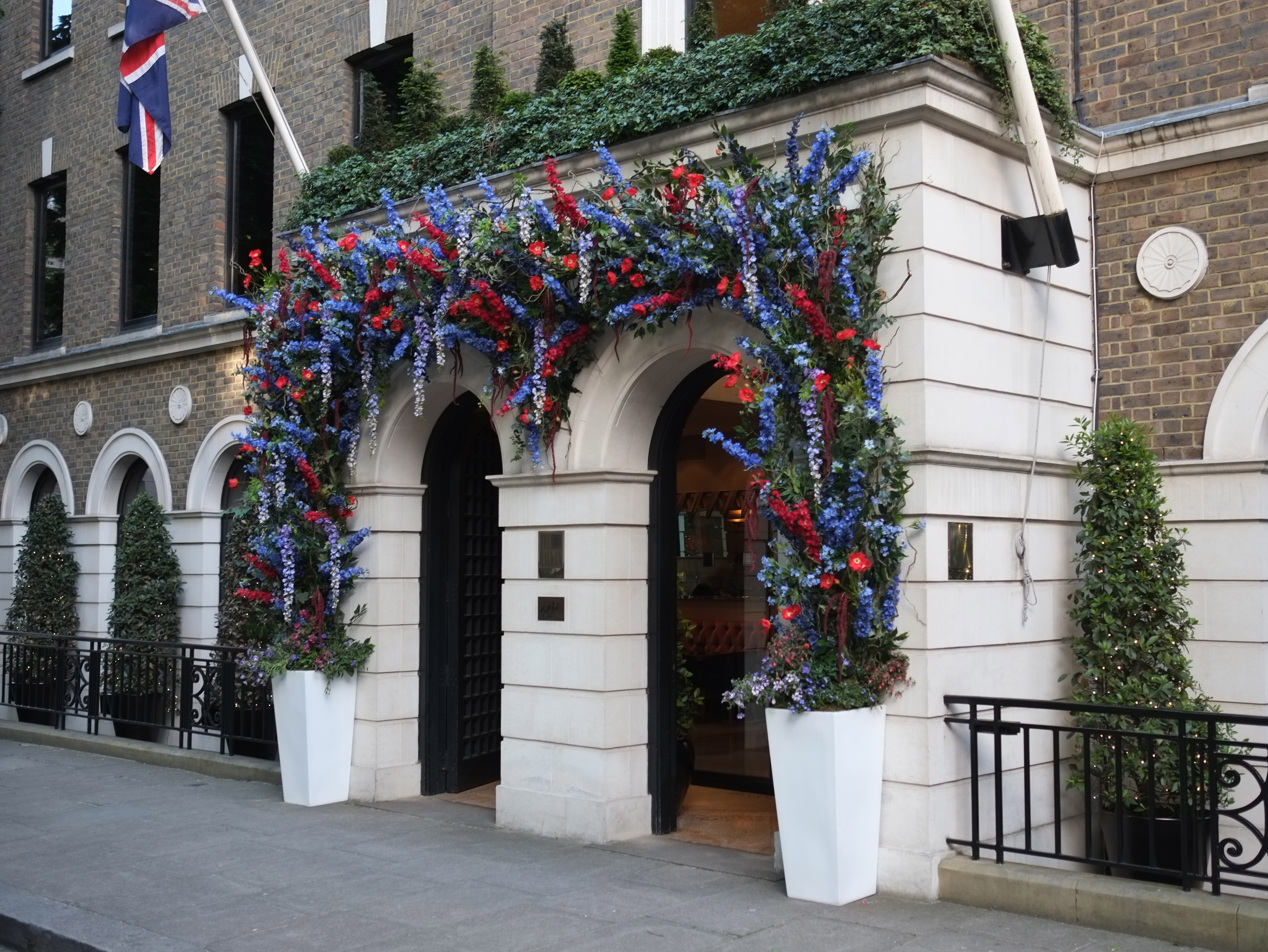
- The hotel's entrance

- Location within Central London

General information
- Location: 5–6 Halkin Street, Belgravia, London, England
- Coordinates: 51°30′2.34″N 0°9′7.7″W
- Operator: COMO Hotels and Resorts

Technical details
- Floor count: 5

Other information
- Number of rooms: 41

Website
- comohotels.com/thehalkin

COMO The Halkin is a 5-star hotel in London, England. It is located at 5–6 Halkin Street in Belgravia, one of London's most affluent districts, just to the east of Belgrave Square. The hotel is operated by COMO Hotels and Resorts. It is considered to be one of the first boutique hotels in London.

The hotel has a Georgian façade of brick and stone, but its interiors (including its 41 rooms and suites) have a more contemporary design. It was the first hotel opened by COMO Hotels and Resorts. The company spent about £1 million on each of the 41 guest rooms and suites, which were designed by Laboratorio Associati Italy.

== Restaurants ==
=== nahm ===
COMO The Halkin originally hosted a Michelin-starred Thai restaurant named nahm, run by Australian chef David Thompson, from 2001 until December 2012. In 2010, a second (and currently only) nahm restaurant was opened at the Metropolitan Bangkok.

=== Ametsa with Arzak Instruction ===
In March 2013, a new restaurant was opened called Ametsa with Arzak Instruction (commonly referred to as simply Ametsa), serving Basque cuisine and run by a team that includes Elena Arzak and her father Juan Mari Arzak.
