= Kane Lim =

Singaporean entrepreneur (born c. 1990)

- Born: c. 1990 (age 35–36); Singapore
- Known for: Bling Empire; Fenty Beauty

Kane Lim (born c. 1990) is a Singaporean entrepreneur, investor, and real estate developer based in Los Angeles. Lim starred in the Netflix reality TV series Bling Empire. In 2022, he launched a line of athletic leisurewear called B.L.I.N.G., which stands for "Because Life Is Not Guaranteed".

== Early life and education ==
Lim was born and raised in Singapore. His grandparents moved there from Communist China. His extended family made its fortune in the oil, shipping, and real estate industries. More recently, his father was on the board of Sian Chay Medical Institution.

At age 17, Lim got a loan from his father to invest and paid him back within two months. He made his first million before turning 20.

He moved to Los Angeles to study and decided to live there.

== Career ==
=== Investment fund ===
Lim runs his own investment fund in Los Angeles. His portfolio includes investments in real estate.

=== Real estate ===
Lim is a real estate developer and agent with Oppenheim Group. He has developed and sold upscale properties in Los Angeles in Venice Beach, Mar Vista, and Highland Park. In addition to residential properties in California, he deals with commercial property investments in Asia.

=== Philanthropy ===
Lim has been a lifelong philanthropist. From 2014 to 2015, he ran an Instagram account selling branded fashion items from his personal collection. He donated proceeds to charities including St. Jude's Research Hospital in Memphis, Tennessee and Race for the Rescues, which promotes animal welfare. He also sold items including a rare Hermès crocodile bracelet at the Singapore Red Cross Internetional Bazaar. More recently, he has supported Miracles for Kids and Uplift Services.

=== Bling Empire ===
During Bling Empire, viewers were given a look at the $300,000 sneaker collection in Lim's home.

== Personal life ==
His Buddhist faith is well documented during the series. His own parents are Christian.
