= Caledonian Club =

Members' club in Belgravia, London, England

Coordinates: 51°30′03″N 0°09′10″W

The Caledonian Club
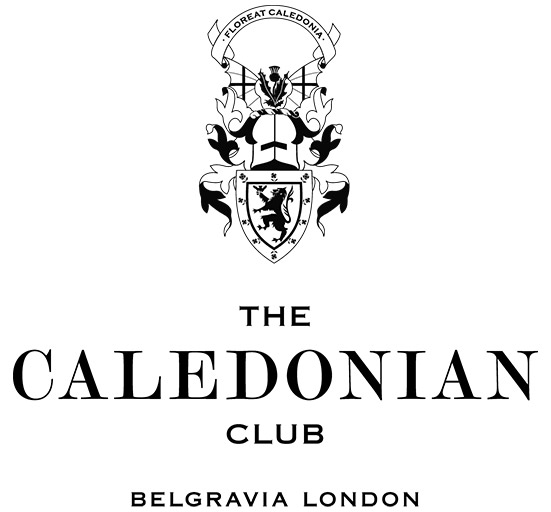
- Formation: 1891 as a proprietary club 1918 as a members' club
- Type: Private members' club
- Purpose: Scottish-focused social club
- Location: 9 Halkin Street, London
- Website: caledonianclub.com

The Caledonian Club is a Scottish-focused private members' club in London, England. It is located at 9 Halkin Street, near Belgrave Square in Belgravia. The Club has a significant history, intertwined with both the military and civilian facets of British society, and continues to serve as a social hub for individuals of Scottish descent or those with an interest in Scottish culture. Although it began as a gentlemen's club, full membership was extended to women in 2010.

== History ==
The Club was founded in 1891 by Scotsman Neville Campbell. Initially a proprietary club (owned by an individual rather than its members), it was located at Waterpark House in Charles II Street, St James's, SW1. Within a few years, due to the popularity of the Club, the premises were changed to 30 Charles Street, St James's, SW1, which had belonged to the Beresford family. At about the same time, it became a limited company.

After the death of the Club owner, Robertson Lawson, in April 1917, the members purchased the remaining assets of the company, transitioning the club to a member-owned establishment in 1918. The Club was formally inaugurated as a members' club at Derby House, St James's Square, with its first General Meeting held on 8 March 1918. This pivotal change was led by John Stewart Murray, 8th Duke of Atholl, who served as the Chairman from 1908 to 1919. He envisioned the Club as "the representative national club and headquarters for Scotsmen in London," welcoming those with close ties to Scotland through birth, education, or direct descent.

During the First World War, the Club played a significant role in supporting its members, with over two hundred members lost.

In 1927, the Scottish inventor, John Logie Baird, used the club to give a private demonstration of his new television system to the Prince of Wales.

In the Second World War, Derby House was destroyed during the Blitz on 16 November 1940, leading to a temporary relocation to the East India & Sports Club and later to the Devonshire Club. In 1946, under the chairmanship of Donald Black, efforts were made to secure a new clubhouse and the current premises in Halkin Street were acquired.

== Modern era ==
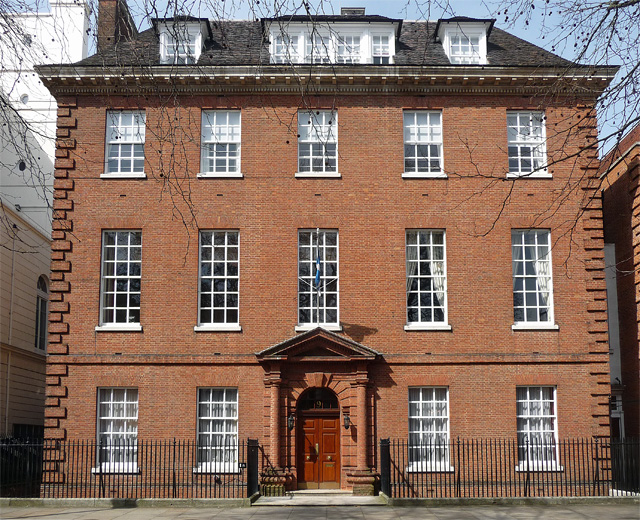
9 Halkin Street in Belgravia, SW1

The current building at No. 9 Halkin Street was constructed in 1916, on the site of a former Episcopal chapel named 'Belgravia Chapel'. It was commissioned by Hugh Morrison, a Conservative MP for Salisbury, to be his private residence in London. Morrison was a significant figure in British history, and he was instrumental in preserving Stonehenge from modern encroachment in the late 1920s.

Morrison employed the architect Detmar Jellings Blow following their prior collaboration to design his country home, Fonthill House in Wiltshire. The building was designed in early Neo-Georgian style, with a Jacobean style porch.

After Morrison's death, the building was later used as a club for ladies and then as Nuffield Officers' Club, before it was acquired and opened by the Caledonian Club on 17 October 1946.

The freehold of the property is owned by the Grosvenor Estate, and Halkin Street derives its name from Halkyn Castle, the Flintshire seat of the Grosvenor family, the Dukes of Westminster.

The club has seen various modernizations over the years, including the addition of double bedrooms in 1969, a terrace in 1994, and a new five-storey wing with a terrace garden, which was opened by Queen Elizabeth II on St Andrew's Day in 2006.

== Notable members ==
The Club's membership included notable individuals such as:

- John Logie Baird, Scottish inventor
- Sean Connery, celebrated Scottish actor, famous for his portrayal of James Bond
- Sir Alex Ferguson, former manager of Manchester United Football Club
- Douglas Haig, 1st Earl Haig, commander of the British Expeditionary Force in the First World War
- Prince Philip, Duke of Edinburgh, late consort to Queen Elizabeth II
- William Purves, former chairman of HSBC
- John Smith, former Leader of the Labour Party

== Activities ==
=== Facilities and events ===
The Caledonian Club offers a range of first-class facilities and services, including a Dining Room, Drawing Room, Library, Bar, snooker room, outside terrace, small Business Centre, as well as a variety of function rooms that cater to events, meetings, and weddings. The bar of the Club has over 200 whiskies and a growing collection of Scottish gins. Members can also use changing rooms with showers and access to Belgrave Square gardens for tennis and outside gym. For accommodation, the Club offers 39 en-suite bedrooms to members and their guests.

The Club hosts a wide range of events throughout the year, including an annual Burns Night Supper, St Andrew's Dinner and Caledonian Club Ball.

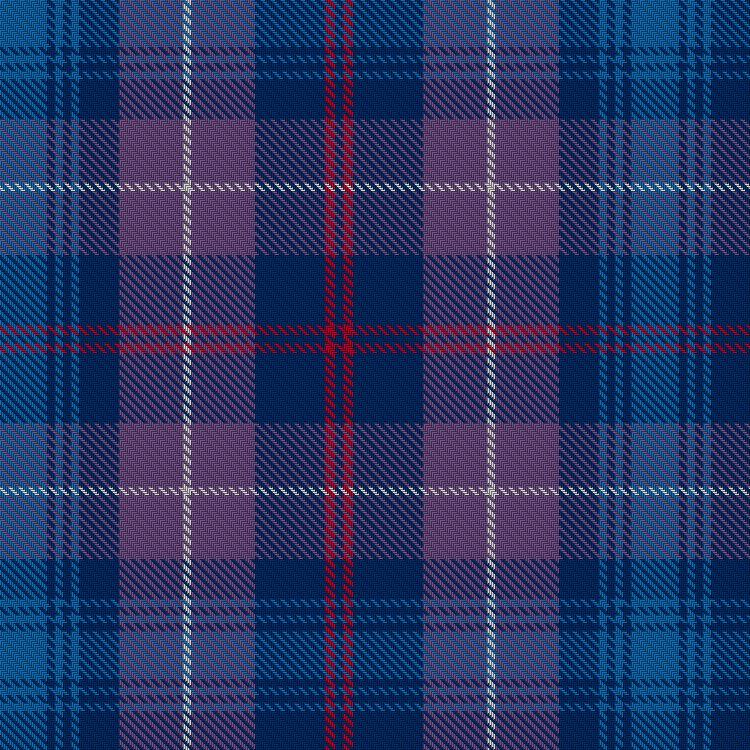
Caledonian Club Tartan

=== Dress code ===
The Club maintains a formal dress code, with jackets, ties and polished black shoes for men, and the equivalent formality for women, however, dress codes are more relaxed on Friday, the weekend and in the summer.

In 2012 the Club launched its own tartan, designed by Kinloch Anderson, based on the sett of the Clan Campbell after the founder of the Club, Neville Campbell. Red from the Clan Morrison tartan was included as 9 Halkin Street was built for Hugh Morrison. The colour influences include the saltire and the Club's crest.

== See also ==
- List of London's gentlemen's clubs
