= Gabriel Chiu =

Hong Kong American plastic surgeon

- Born: Gabriel Ham Chang Chiu Jr. Hong Kong
- Education: University of California, Berkeley; Western University of Health Sciences (DO)
- Occupations: Plastic surgeon; philanthropist
- Spouse: Christine Chiu (m. 2006)
- Children: 1

Gabriel Ham Chang Chiu Jr is a Hong Kong American plastic surgeon and philanthropist who guest stars in Netflix's reality TV series Bling Empire alongside his wife Christine Chiu. Chiu was born in Hong Kong and claims to be a direct descendant of the Song dynasty emperors.

== Education ==
Chiu attended the University of California, Berkeley for his undergraduate degree where he majored in Microbiology and Immunology. He received his Doctor of Osteopathic Medicine degree at Western University of Health Sciences in Pomona, California.

== Career ==
Chiu completed his residency at Detroit Riverview Hospital in General Surgery. The following year he went on to become Chief Resident, General Surgery, at Cuyahoga Falls General Hospital. After one year, he continued to the Philadelphia College of Osteopathic Medicine where he was Fellow, Plastic and Reconstructive Surgery for two years before becoming the Chief Fellow in 2002.

Chiu was the first employee at his wife's plastic surgery practice. The clinic, called Beverly Hills Plastic Surgery, is situated in Los Angeles. The clinic has more than 35,000 patients and has a lot of affluent customers.

== Personal life ==
Chiu married businesswoman and philanthropist Christine Chiu in 2006. They have one child, Gabriel Chiu III, who was conceived via in vitro fertilization in 2018. For his first birthday, the Chius donated $1 million to the Cayton Children's Museum in Santa Monica.

== Philanthropy ==
The Chiu family commits 50% of every net dollar back into their community. Some of the charities they work most closely with are Art of Elysium, The Prince's Foundation, The Ghetto Film School, Elizabeth Taylor AIDS Foundation, Cystic Fibrosis Foundation, and AmFAR. Chiu and his wife are the main backers of the Prince's Foundation Health & Wellbeing Centre at Dumfries House in East Ayrshire, Scotland. The center uses complementary therapies to help locals with obesity, loneliness, and depression.
