= Forbes House, Belgravia =

House in Belgravia, London

Coordinates: 51°30′04″N 0°09′09″W

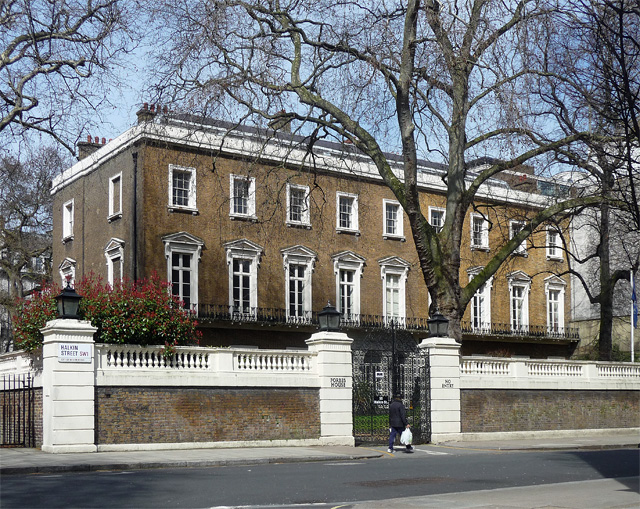
Forbes House

Forbes House is a Grade II listed detached mansion at 10 Halkin Street, Belgravia, London SW1.

== History ==
It was built in the early-mid 19th century, and was originally called Mortimer House after Edward Harley, 3rd Earl of Oxford and Earl Mortimer, for whom the house was built.

It is named after Bernard Forbes, 8th Earl of Granard and his wife Beatrice Forbes, Countess of Granard, who had it as their principal residence.

Forbes House was used to depict an Eastern European embassy, and Doris Day sang "Que Sera Sera" in the ballroom, in Alfred Hitchcock's film, The Man Who Knew Too Much.

For over 50 years until 2010, it was the headquarters of the Society of Motor Manufacturers and Traders. In 2010, the remaining 47-year lease was sold for about £40 million. Grant Wellbelove of Belgravia based Estate Agents Wellbelove Quested represented the Buyer. In 2012, The Guardian reported that it had been bought by David and Frederick Barclay through "offshore entities in Jersey and the British Virgin Islands (BVI)", and that they had spent £48 million, and the house would provide a London base for Sir David Barclay's son, Aidan Barclay. Forbes House was bought by Forbes House Ltd, registered in the BVI with a £48m loan, and a subsidiary company, the Jersey-registered Halkin St Development Ltd has made the appropriate planning applications to convert it back into a single home.

In 2016 the Barclays sold it to former Qatar prime minister Hamad bin Jassim bin Jaber Al Thani. In 2020 Westminster City Council approved the wholesale remodelling of the original staircase, despite objections from the Council Officers.

== Notable residents ==
Notable residents of Forbes House have included the Earl of Oxford and Earl Mortimer in the early to mid-19th century, and Edward Douglas-Pennant, 1st Baron Penrhyn from 1860.
