= Meru Networks =

American networking equipment manufacturer

- Type: Subsidiary
- Traded as: Nasdaq: MERU
- Industry: Wireless LAN
- Founded: 2002; 24 years ago, in Sunnyvale, California, U.S.
- Founder: Dr. Vaduvur Bharghavan; Srinath Sarang; Joseph Epstein; Sung-Wook Han
- Headquarters: Sunnyvale, California, U.S.
- Area served: Worldwide
- Key people: Bami Bastani (CEO); Larry Vaughan (SVP Sales)Sarosh Vesuna (SVP & GM Enterprise BU)
- Products: Wireless access points Wireless LAN Controller; Networking devices
- Revenue: ▲USD 90.5 million (2011)
- Net income: ▼USD 26.7 million (2011)
- Total assets: ▼USD 66.8 million (2011)
- Total equity: ▼USD 32.5 million (2011)
- Number of employees: 403 (2011)
- Parent: Fortinet
- Website: merunetworks.com

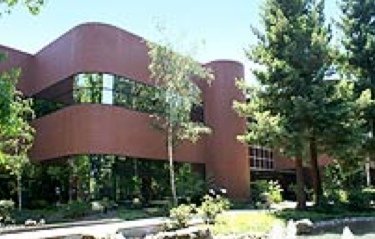
Headquarters of Meru Networks

Meru Networks was a supplier of wireless local area networks (WLANs) to healthcare, enterprise, hospitality, K-12 education, higher education, and other markets. Founded in 2002 and headquartered in Sunnyvale, California, United States, the company made its initial public offering in March 2010, and was acquired by Fortinet in May 2015.

== History ==
Meru Networks was founded in 2002 to address issues with legacy wireless networking architectures that support two separate access networks: a wired network for business-specific applications and a wireless network for casual use. This causes problems ranging from co-channel interference to the inability of micro-cellular systems to scale up. Meru Networks develops and markets a virtualized wireless LAN solution that enables enterprises to migrate applications from wired networks to wireless networks and become what Meru refers to as the "All-wireless enterprise." The company uses an approach to wireless networking that employs virtualization technology to create a self-monitoring wireless network that provides access to applications, improved application performance, and a greater ability to run converged applications, such as voice, video and data, over a wireless network.

The company’s current products address the IEEE 802.11ac and 802.11n wireless networking standards, The company focuses on a “Virtual Cell” approach to Wi-Fi. Under a single service assurance platform, it aggregates access points and the controller needed to manage them. This simplifies the management of access points, cuts the number of access points needed on a wireless network, and eliminates bandwidth contention issues.

In 2011, the company was awarded ITP Technology Best Wireless Solution and was listed as a Health Management Technology Coolest Products.

== Timeline ==
- February 2002: Meru Networks founded by Dr. Vaduvur Bharghavan, Srinath Sarang, Sung-Wook Han, Joe Epstein,
- June 2005: Company receives $12 million in Series C funding
- May 2006: Company receives $25M in Series D funding
- January 2007: Company receives $27.6M in unattributed funding
- January 2009: Company adds Ihab Abu-Hakima as President and CEO
- April 2009: Company receives $30M in Series E funding
- August 2009: Company receives an additional $57M in Series E funding
- March 2010: Company goes public with stock symbol NASDAQ:MERU
- May 2011: Dr. Vaduvur Bharghavan founds another company, becomes Advisory CTO
- March 2012: Bami Bastani appointed as President and CEO
- May 2015: Fortinet acquires Meru Networks

== Main Products and Services ==
=== Software ===
- Meru System Director Operating SystemRuns on all Meru controllers and access points, implementing its virtualized wireless LAN technology. As an operating system, System Director runs other applications to deal with the specific requirements of the enterprise. Each application module is integrated with System Director, using its low-level control over the radio frequencies.
- Meru Identity ManagerAllows businesses to provide access to thousands of Wi-Fi devices in the “bring your own device” (BYOD) workplace.
- Meru Service Assurance ManagerProvides network-wide operations monitoring and diagnostics for wireless networks and the applications that run over them.
- Meru E(z)RF Network ManagerManages multiple controllers and thousands of access points providing real-time location tracking and location firewall.
- Meru Spectrum ManagerA spectrum analysis solution.

=== Hardware ===
- Access Points. Built from the radio layer up to support virtualized wireless LANs and, with Meru software, to allow enterprise IT groups to replace wired Ethernet switches at the network edge.
- Controllers. Supporting from five to thousands of access points, Meru WLAN controllers synchronize these points to avoid interference and govern all traffic on the network to support more users and backhaul capacity.
- Appliances. The Meru Services Appliance family is an extensible platform that provides a set of applications for management of 802.11x networks. The appliance collects a range of data from Meru access points, storing it in a common database, where it is used by the higher-level management applications.

Products and services are sold through value-added resellers (VARs) and distributors.

== Markets ==
The company focuses on the education, healthcare and hospitality markets. Approximately three-quarters of its global sales come from the Americas, and among its 12,500 customers worldwide are the CME Group and Hellmann Worldwide Logistics.

While the company’s main emphasis is on the markets noted above, they are not its exclusive focus. In December 2011, for example, Meru announced that it was working with Ayacht Technology Solutions to install a new Wi-Fi network at historic, 37,000-seat Fenway Park, the home of Major League Baseball's Boston Red Sox.

== Acquisitions ==
On September 8, 2011, Meru announced that it had acquired access control specialist Identity Networks. Founded in 2006 and based in Manchester, UK, Identity Networks develops and markets tools that offer provisioning and notification services that give guests access credentials by way of email, or SMS, and also provide reporting, auditing, and policy customization.

== Acquisition ==
On May 27, 2015, Fortinet agreed to acquire Meru Networks for $44M in cash. Fortinet will integrate the Meru Networks team and operations into their organization.
