= House of Ho =

American reality television series

- Genre: Reality television
- Country of origin: United States
- No. of seasons: 2
- No. of episodes: 17

Production
- Executive producers: Stephanie Bloch Chambers; Katy Wallin; Nick Lee; Karla LeCroix; Rosalina Lydster
- Producers: Sonya Novak; Kelly Greaney
- Running time: 28–39 minutes
- Production companies: Wallin Chambers Entertainment; Lionsgate Television

Original release
- Network: HBO Max
- Release: December 10, 2020 – September 8, 2022

House of Ho is an American reality television series on HBO Max. The series focuses on a Vietnamese American family in Houston. Priyanka Bose of The A.V. Club called the show "a bleak portrayal of life as a crazy rich Asian". The series first season was released on December 10, 2020. The second season premiered on August 25, 2022.

== Cast ==
- Binh Ho
- Hue Ho
- Judy Ho
- Lesley Ho
- Washington Ho
- Aunt Tina
- Cousin Sammy
- Nate Nguyen
- Kim Ho (season 2)
- Bella Ho (season 2)
- Tran Nguyen (season 2)
- Tammy Gee (season 2)
- Carlton Kon (season 2)
- Vanessa Kon (season 2)

== Episodes ==
=== Series overview ===
Season	Episodes	Originally released	
Season	Episodes	First released	Last released
1	7	December 10, 2020	
2	10	August 25, 2022	September 8, 2022

=== Season 1 (2020) ===
No. overall	No. in season	Title	Original release date
1	1	"Ho Sweet Home"	December 10, 2020
2	2	"Ho! Ho! Ho!"	December 10, 2020
3	3	"Ho Lotta Gossip"	December 10, 2020
4	4	"Ho-listic"	December 10, 2020
5	5	"Duck, Duck Ho"	December 10, 2020
6	6	"New Year, New Ho"	December 10, 2020
7	7	"The Big Four-Ho"	December 10, 2020

=== Season 2 (2022) ===
No. overall	No. in season	Title	Original release date
8	1	"Engaged to a Ho"	August 25, 2022
9	2	"Diamond Ho"	August 25, 2022
10	3	"A Ho in the Oven"	August 25, 2022
11	4	"Ho Hue or the Highway"	September 1, 2022
12	5	"Insecure Ho"	September 1, 2022
13	6	"Ready to Ho!"	September 1, 2022
14	7	"Ho No!"	September 8, 2022
15	8	"Land Ho"	September 8, 2022
16	9	"Ground Control to Major Ho"	September 8, 2022
17	10	"Ho in Love"	September 8, 2022

== Release ==
House of Ho 's first season was released on December 10, 2020. The second season was released on August 25, 2022, with the first three episodes available immediately, followed by three episodes on September 1, and the final four episodes on September 8.

== See also ==
- Bling Empire
