= Club 21 =

Retail company

Club 21 Pte Ltd
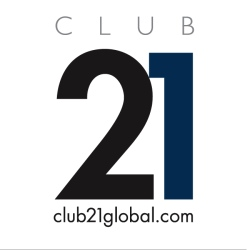
- Company type: Private
- Industry: Fashion retailing
- Founded: 1972; 54 years ago
- Founder: Christina Ong
- Headquarters: Singapore
- Area served: Australia, China, Hong Kong, Indonesia, Korea, Macau, Malaysia, Singapore, Taiwan, Thailand, United Kingdom and United States
- Website: https://www.club21global.com/

Club 21 is a luxury retail company established in 1972 by Singaporean entrepreneur-hotelier Christina Ong. Club 21 started as a small boutique in Singapore's Tanglin Shopping Centre and has expanded to operate multi-label fashion stores at Four Seasons Singapore, as well as licensed boutiques in Australia, China, Hong Kong, Indonesia, Korea, Malaysia and Singapore, Taiwan, Thailand, the United Kingdom and USA.

Club 21 used to manage the brands Donna Karan, ck Calvin Klein, Giorgio Armani, A|X Armani Exchange, Balenciaga, Marni, Mulberry, Dolce & Gabbana, D&G, Diesel, Paul Smith, Issey Miyake, Jil Sander, Dries Van Noten, Comme des Garçons and Lanvin. It also operates ck Calvin Klein and DKNY Jeans under license. A joint venture with Giorgio Armani S.p.A. is expanding the A|X Armani Exchange brand worldwide. Club 21 has 3,800 employees across four continents, engaged in wholesale distribution, sourcing, brand guardianship and vertical retail.
