= Christina Ong =

Singaporean businesswoman

- Born: Christina Fu; October 1947 (age 78)
- Occupation: Businesswoman
- Spouse: Ong Beng Seng
- Children: 2

Christina Ong (née Fu, born October 1947) is a Singaporean businesswoman who owns the COMO Group, which includes London-listed Club 21 fashion stores and COMO Hotels and Resorts. As of 2024, Christina and her husband were ranked 27th on Forbes Singapore's richest list with an estimated net worth of US$1.7 billion.

== Career ==
Ong opened a clothing store in 1972, prior to founding the COMO Group, which includes Club 21 fashion stores and COMO Hotels and Resorts.

Ong took control of Mulberry in 2003 and owns a number of properties on Bond Street in London. Her property portfolio includes all Armani outlets in Britain. Ong also holds the franchises for Donna Karen and DKNY.

Ong is a former chairman of Singapore's National Parks Board.

== Personal life ==
Ong is the daughter of Peter Fu Yun Siak, an early employer of her husband and founder of Kuo International. She is married to Singapore-based Malaysian business magnate and investor Ong Beng Seng. They have two children, a daughter, Melissa, and a son, Jonathan.

== Recognition ==
Ong was awarded the Italian Fashion Hall of Fame Award in 1995 for her services to the Italian fashion industry, and was conferred the Cavaliere del Lavoro.

In 2013, Ong received Singapore's Meritorious Service Medal, one of three awarded that year.

In 2014, Ong was included in the inaugural Singapore Women's Hall of Fame.
