= Ong Beng Seng =

Malaysian businessman (born 1946)

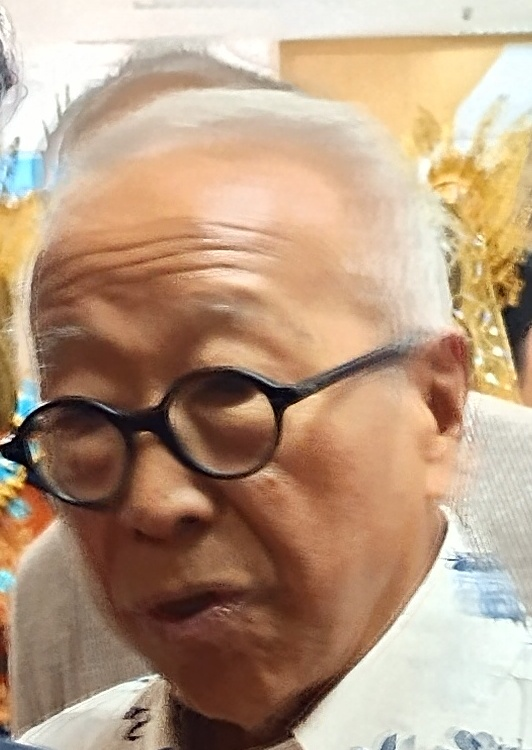
- Ong in 2024
- Born: January 1946 (age 80); Teluk Anson, Perak, Federated Malay States
- Occupation: Businessman
- Spouse: Christina Ong
- Children: 2

Ong Beng Seng (Note: Chinese: 王明星; Pe̍h-ōe-jī: Ông Bêng-seng) (born January 1946) is a Malaysian billionaire businessman based in Singapore. He is the founder of the Singapore-based organisation Hotel Properties Limited (HPL) which is a shareholder of various businesses, including Hard Rock resorts and Four Seasons resorts across Europe and Asia.

== Early life ==
Ong was born in January 1946 in Teluk Anson, Perak, which was then the Federated Malay States (FMS). When he was four years old, his family emigrated to Singapore. Ong Beng Seng has three brothers, Beng Huat, Beng Lim and Beng Min. He attended the Anglo-Chinese School. His career began when he joined an insurance firm for ships. In 1975, he joined Kuo International, founded by businessman Peter Fu Yun Siak and there he met his later-to-be spouse, Christina.

== Career ==
After beginning his trading career at Kuo International, Ong went on to found his own firm, Hotel Properties Limited. Today, he controls many businesses, including a few based in Bond Street in London, and his investments are worth tens of millions of dollars. He is a well-established hotelier, having bought and built many hotels worldwide. As the chairman of race promoter Singapore GP, Ong is credited with bringing Formula One racing to the country; the inaugural Singapore Grand Prix, which was also the first F1 night race, was held in 2008.

=== 1995 discounted apartment sales by HPL ===
On 22 April 1996, the Stock Exchange of Singapore criticised HPL for not having been "forthcoming" about discounts it had given to several prominent individuals in relation to property sales. HPL had allegedly sold condominium units at a discount to Lee Suan Yew, who was the brother of then-Senior Minister Lee Kuan Yew, and a director of HPL.

Lee Kuan Yew and his son, then-Deputy Prime Minister Lee Hsien Loong subsequently stated in a joint statement dated 23 April 1996 that they had also purchased condominium units at a discount from HPL.

HPL founder and managing director, Ong, insisted that no preferential treatment had been given to the Lees and stated that he was "a businessman, not a pontificator... (who) did what a businessman would have done".

After reviewing the results of an investigation by the Monetary Authority of Singapore (MAS), then-Prime Minister Goh Chok Tong cleared the Lees of any wrongdoing.

== Investigation and prosecution for corruption ==
On 14 July 2023, it was announced that he had been arrested on 11 July 2023 in connection with a potential corruption case related to Singapore's Minister of Transport S. Iswaran, issued for him by the Corrupt Practices Investigation Bureau (CPIB).

Ong was charged in the Singapore District Court on 4 October 2024 with one charge under Section 165 of the Penal Code and one charge under Section 204A of the Penal Code. It was reported that Ong was not remanded and was out on SGD 800,000 bail.

In a regulatory filing with the Singapore Exchange (on which HPL is listed), HPL stated that Ong had informed HPL of the two charges and was seeking legal advice. HPL stated that Ong would remain managing director of HPL for the time being and its nominating committee and board had assessed that Ong "continues to be suitable to carry out his duties and responsibilities as managing director". HPL had requested a trading halt prior to Ong being charged.

The charging of Ong closely followed the Singapore High Court's decision on 3 October 2024 to sentence Iswaran to 12 months imprisonment for obtaining valuable items as a public servant and obstructing justice.

On 28 February, during a pre trial conference, Ong indicated he plan to plead guilty to both charges. His bail of SGD 800,000 was extended and a new pre trial conference was set for 2 April to let him please guilty. After several delays, Ong's pre trial conference was finally held on 28 July. 4 August, Ong pleaded guilty to abetting offences, for which he faces up to two years in jail. Instead, he was fined S$30,000 after the presiding judge cited his poor health in granting "judicial mercy". Judicial mercy was granted due to Ong having advanced multiple myeloma, an incurable cancer, and risks of fatal infections/falls while in prison.

In November 2025, Ong's permanent residence status (PR) in Singapore was reviewed by the Immigration and Checkpoints Authority (ICA) of Singapore, and would not be revoked. He was however issued an ICA warning letter that puts him on notice that any future adverse conduct will render him liable for revocation of his PR status.

== Personal life ==
Ong lives in Singapore with his family. He is married to Christina Ong (née Fu), the daughter of a businessman; they have a daughter and a son. A "glitzy figure in Singapore and abroad", Ong was described by Hilary Clarke of The Independent as "media shy" and "notoriously secretive". Despite that, he is known to be well-acquainted with many Hollywood celebrities.

=== Wealth ===
Ong's business approach is to "buy and rent when properties are cheap and sell when they are not." Forbes estimates the net worth of Ong and his wife Christina Ong at $1.7 billion as of 2024 making them the 27th richest people in Singapore.
