= Dorothy Wang =

American television personality and socialite (born 1988)

- Born: January 27, 1988 (age 38); Beverly Hills, California, U.S.
- Years active: 2013–present
- Spouse: Brandon Yankowitz (m. 2025)
- Father: Roger Wang
- Website: dorothywang.com

Dorothy Wang Yankowitz (born January 27, 1988) is an American television personality, socialite, heiress, and entrepreneur. Wang rose to fame when she appeared on the E! reality series Rich Kids of Beverly Hills (2014–2016). She later appeared on the Netflix reality series Bling Empire (2022).

== Early life ==
Wang was born on January 27, 1988, in Beverly Hills, California, where she was raised. The youngest of two children, Wang is the daughter of Taiwanese parents Vivine Wang, philanthropist, and H. Roger Wang, founder of Nanjing real estate development group Golden Eagle International, which she is an heiress to. She has one older sister named Janice. Wang attended the Harvard-Westlake School, where she was a cheerleader and landed her first job in a Nike commercial. Wang attended both University of Southern California and Southern Methodist University before ultimately graduating from USC. According to Wang, she wasn't aware of her families wealth until she discovered her father on a Forbes list when she was an adult.

== Career ==
In 2012, Wang, then-24, began being featured on the Tumblr website "The Rich Kids of Instagram", where she was discovered by television producers who approached her to appear in an upcoming reality series based on the blog. After recommending friend Morgan Stewart, the two recruited friends for casting. By August 2013, it was announced that E! Network was developing Rich Kids of Beverly Hills. In October, Wang, along with the ensemble cast were announced as the show's main subjects. Upon its January 2014 airing, Jon Caramanica of The New York Times referred to the cast as "young narcissists relentlessly documenting themselves." Wang remained a main cast member for four seasons until the show's cancellation in November 2016.

In 2015, Wang announced the launch of her champagne line "Rich and Bubbly", which was sold on her website before being discontinued in 2017. In November 2016, Wang was announced as a cast member on the second season of E!'s reality dating series Famously Single, which aired in June 2017.

In April 2022, Wang joined the cast of Netflix's reality series Bling Empire for its second season. Wang was then announced as a part of the cast for the show's spin off, Bling Empire: New York, which premiered in January 2023. In April, both series were canceled. In September 2026, Wang launched her five-part wedding docuseries Dorothy's I Do, co-produced by Wang and her husband's production company Chez Yankowitz, along with former Rich Kids of Beverly Hills producer Gennifer Gardiner.

== Personal life ==
In 2023, Wang moved to New York City, having previously lived in Los Angeles.

In October 2024, Wang announced her engagement to lawyer Brandon Yankowitz. The couple married exactly one year later on October 11, 2025, in Florence, Italy, with the reception at the Palazzo Corsini. Wang's pre-wedding dress was custom designed by Prabal Gurung, while her faille custom Oscar de la Renta wedding gown was designed by the label's co-creative directors Laura Kim and Fernando Garcia.

On October 1, 2026, Wang announced she and Yankowitz were expecting their first child.
