= Roger Wang =

Taiwanese-American businessman

- 王恆
- Born: 1948 or 1949 (age 76–77); China
- Other names: H. Roger Wang
- Education: Chinese Culture University (LLB); Southeastern Louisiana University (MBA)
- Occupations: Businessman, philanthropist
- Spouse: Vivine Wang
- Children: 2
- Relatives: Dorothy Wang (daughter)

Roger Wang
- Traditional Chinese: 王恆
- Simplified Chinese: 王恒
Transcriptions
Standard Mandarin
- Hanyu Pinyin: Wáng Héng

Roger Wang (Chinese: 王恆; born 1948/49) is a Taiwanese-American businessman. He is the chairman and former chief executive officer (CEO) of the Golden Eagle International Group.

== Early life and education ==
In 1948, Wang was born in mainland China; his family moved to Taiwan when he was young. In 1970, Wang immigrated from Taiwan to the United States. He graduated from Chinese Culture University with a Bachelor of Laws (LL.B.) and, in 1973, Wang earned a Master of Business Administration degree from Southeastern Louisiana University.

== Career ==
Wang returned to China in 1992 and founded the Golden Eagle International Group in Nanjing, starting by building a tower and opening a department store. The company became a conglomerate specializing in many things ranging from real estate development and automotive maintenance. He founded the Golden Eagle Retail Group in 1995 to operate department stores within China, particularly Jiangsu province; the retail Group became public on the Hong Kong Stock Exchange in 2006, ticker 3308, with Wang as the main shareholder.

He was featured in Forbes' List of billionaires (2007) and The Forbes 400 Richest Americans.

As of August 2016, Wang is the chairman of Golden Eagle. He is the former CEO, and Su Kai has been CEO since August 2014.

He was one of the Executive Board Members of The U.S. – China Policy Foundation.

In 2019 a residential building owned by Wang, located in the Arts District neighborhood of Los Angeles was placed into the Rent Escrow Account Program. The Rent Escrow Account Program (R.E.A.P.) is a program of "last resort" designed to protect renters from slumlords that refuse to repair substandard housing in the city of Los Angeles. In July 2020 roughly 20 tenants in his apartment building collectively filed a lawsuit alleging tenant harassment, breach of the warranty of habitability and intentional infliction of emotional distress among other causes of action. The case's outcome is pending a trial scheduled for January 2026.

== Philanthropy ==
Wang made a large charitable contribution to The Huntington Library in San Marino, California.

== Awards ==
- 2009 Alumnus of the Year. Presented by Southeastern Louisiana University.

== Personal life ==
In 1978, Wang was naturalized as a United States citizen.

Wang's wife is Vivine Wang. They have two daughters, Janice and Dorothy Wang. He splits his time between China and Beverly Hills, California.
