= Pacific Architects and Engineers =

U.S.-based military and government services contractor

- Industry: construction, consulting, logistics, professional services
- Founded: 1955
- Founder: Edward Shay
- Defunct: 15 February 2022
- Fate: Merged with Amentum Government Services
- Headquarters: 1320 N Courthouse Road, Arlington, Virginia, United States
- Key people: Allen Shay (former CEO, Chairman and Co-owner 1995-2006); John E. Heller (CEO); Charles Peiffer (CFO)
- Revenue: $2.1 billion (2016)
- Number of employees: 20,000 (2020)
- Website: pae.com

Pacific Architects and Engineers (commonly known as PAE, or PA&E) is an American defense and government services contractor. Founded in 1955 by Edward Shay, it is headquartered in Arlington, Virginia. For a time after 2016 it was owned by Platinum Equity until it became listed on Nasdaq in 2018. In February 2022 the company merged with Amentum Government Services Holdings LLC and its stock was delisted from Nasdaq.

PAE is a major supplier of services to the U.S. Department of State. Other significant clients have included the United Nations, the UK Ministry of Defence, the New Zealand Defence Force, and the Central Intelligence Agency.

== History ==
PAE was founded in California in 1955 by Edward Shay, an American engineer who had worked in Japan during its occupation; its earliest business deals involved property development in Japan. Shay continued as chair, CEO, and sole shareholder of PAE until 1974 when 40 percent of the company was sold to an employee stock ownership program. The program sold its shares back to Shay in 1988. Following Shay's death in 1995, his son – Allen E. Shay – assumed control of the company as chairman and CEO.

PAE was acquired by Lockheed Martin in 2006 in what was reported, in a subsequent court filing, to be a cash transaction valued at approximately $1.2 billion. During Lockheed's ownership, PAE moved its headquarters from Los Angeles, California to Arlington, Virginia. It was sold by Lockheed, in 2011, to Lindsay Goldberg for about $700 million.

Lindsay Goldberg sold PAE to Platinum Equity in 2016.

The company became publicly traded on the NASDAQ in February 2020.

=== Acquisitions ===
In 2015 PAE acquired both A-T Solutions and the Global Security and Solutions unit of U.S. Investigations Service. Two years later, in 2017, it purchased FCi. In 2018, PAE acquired Macfadden & Associates (Macfadden), a leader in international disaster response operational support.

== Operations and clients ==
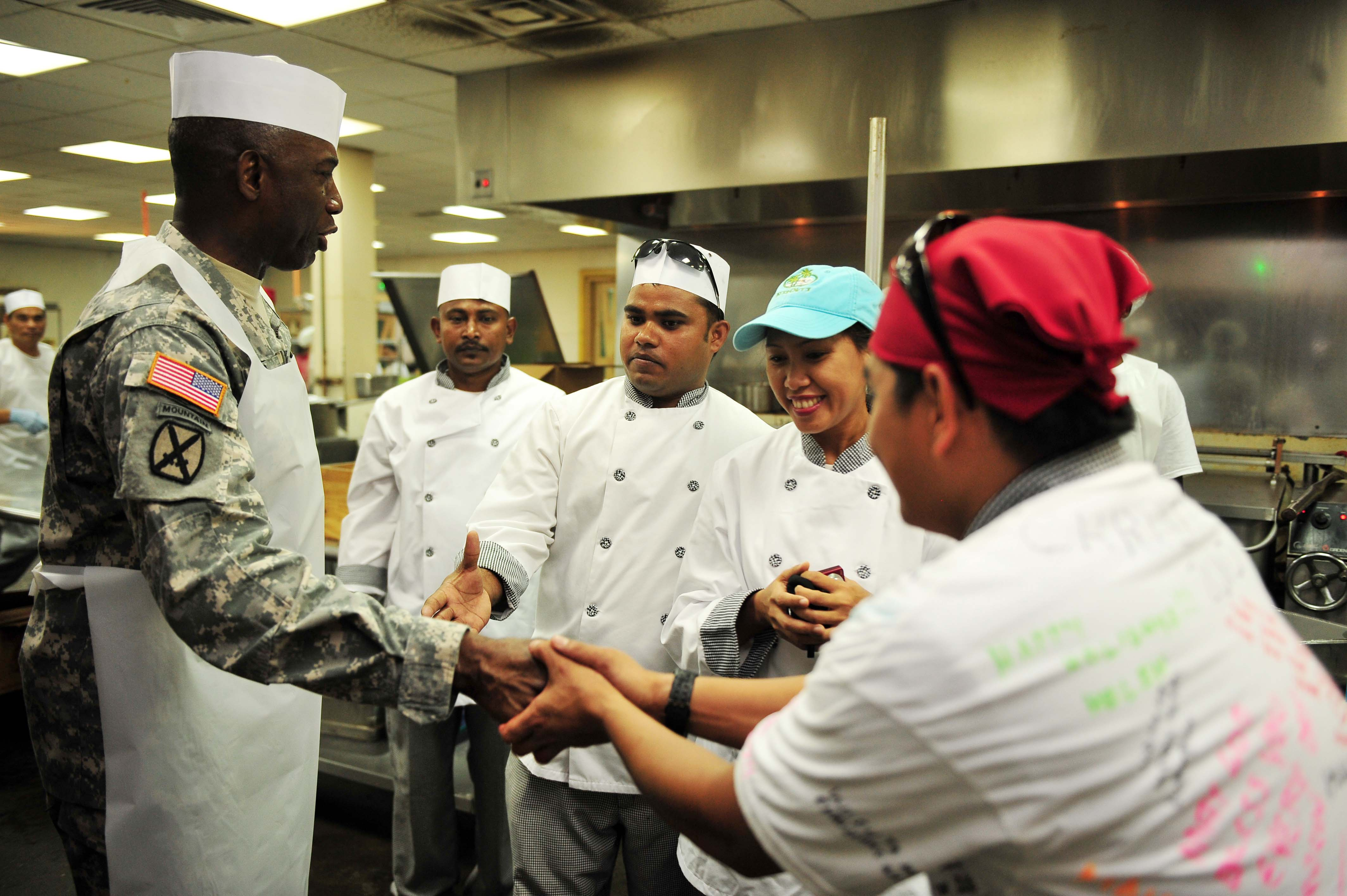
U.S. Army General William E. Ward speaks with PAE personnel staffing the galley at Camp Lemonnier, a U.S. Navy facility in Djibouti, in 2010.

PAE specializes in "expeditionary logistics" and "nation building" including construction and supply of basecamps for peacekeeping missions, airfield management and maintenance, foreign aid distribution, police training, and elections monitoring, and it has additional capabilities including technical support for weapons of mass destruction elimination, vessel and cargo tracking software, crime scene software, and weather forecasting. According to PAE, its clients – as of 2016 – included the United Nations, New Zealand Defence Force, U.S. Department of Energy, UK Ministry of Defence, National Science Foundation, National Oceanic and Atmospheric Administration, U.S. Navy, U.S. Army Corps of Engineers, and U.S. Department of State, among others.

As of 2015, PAE was 57th in a list of the top 100 contractors of the United States government based on total value of contracts signed, receiving $1.04 billion in contract awards that year. The same year it, along with two sub-contractors, agreed to a $1.45 million out-of-court settlement with the United States over claims it had engaged in bid-rigging of a U.S. Army contract for support in Afghanistan. According to the U.S. Department of Justice, "former managers of PAE and RM Asia funneled subcontracts paid for by the government to companies owned by the former managers and their relatives by using confidential bid information to ensure that their companies would beat out other, honest competitors". A PAE program manager, his spouse, and two employees of a sub-contractor also pleaded guilty to criminal charges of procurement fraud over the matter. In 2017 it paid a $5 million fine to the U.S. government after it "failed to follow vetting requirements for personnel working in Afghanistan under a State Department contract for labor services"; $875,000 of the fine was awarded to a PAE whistleblower who first reported the issue.

=== Central Intelligence Agency ===
During the Vietnam War, PAE provided cover for the Central Intelligence Agency's Phoenix Program; Colston Westbrook was among Phoenix Program operators formally employed by PAE. PAE was also awarded the contracts for the construction of 44 Province Interrogation Centers (PICs) in South Vietnam.

=== National Aeronautics and Space Administration ===
According to PAE, since 2016 it has operated NASA's Stennis Space Center and Michoud Assembly Facility as part of a joint contract with BWX Technologies. As part of the joint contract, the two companies "do everything from cutting the grass to supporting advanced manufacturing and rocket engine testing" at the two facilities.

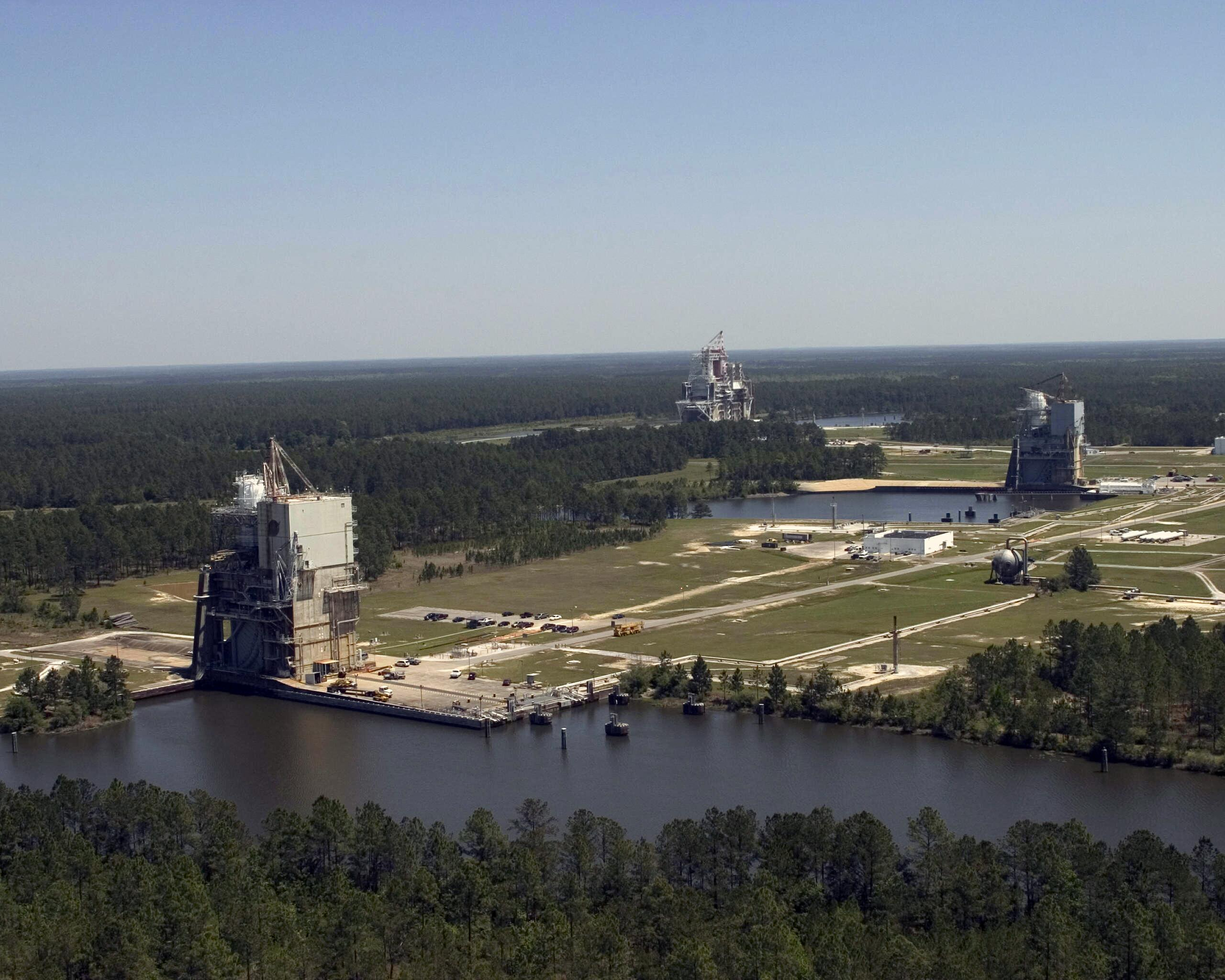
PAE runs NASA's Stennis Space Center (pictured).

=== National Oceanic and Atmospheric Administration ===
As of 2017, PAE was supplying approximately 130 technical support personnel to the National Oceanic and Atmospheric Administration's National Data Buoy Center.

=== National Science Foundation ===
In 2012, PAE was awarded a $100 million contract to support the United States Antarctic Program for the National Science Foundation. Under the terms of the contract, PAE was tasked with providing medical support, facility construction and management, and equipment and personnel transportation to sites in Antarctica.

=== New Zealand Defence Force ===
In 2014, PAE was awarded a NZ$72 million contract by the New Zealand Defence Force (NZDF) for "building and facility construction and maintenance services". According to PAE, it was the "first facilities provider to support Land, Sea and Air operations simultaneously for the NZDF". Specific projects undertaken by PAE for the New Zealand Defence Force have included refurbishment of the RNZAF Survival Training Centre at RNZAF Base Auckland and renovation of classrooms at the New Zealand Defence College.

=== United Nations ===
In 2006, the UN awarded PAE a $250 million no-bid contract for the construction of camps for use by UN peacekeepers in the Sudan. PAE has also provided contract police to UN missions in Haiti and Liberia.

=== U.S. Customs and Border Protection ===
In 2012, PAE was among the top five companies in terms of value of contracts awarded by U.S. Customs and Border Protection (CBP). That year its contract for developing CBP operational systems was valued at $97 million.

=== U.S. Department of State ===
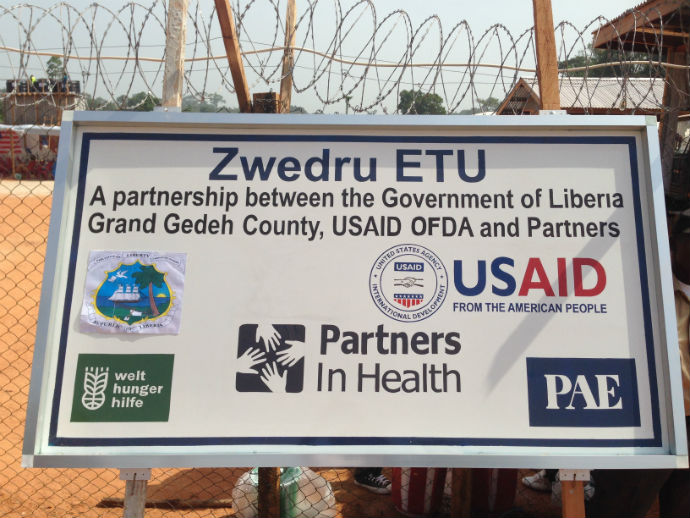
The PAE logo shown on a sign at a U.S.-funded, and PAE-operated, ebola treatment center in Liberia in 2015.

In 2007, Thomas P. M. Barnett called PAE the "KBR of the State Department". (Note: KBR, a government services contractor, was known for its umbrella contract to provide "everything from showers to rebuilding airfields" to the U.S. Department of Defense.)

According to PAE, its earliest work for the State Department began in the 1950s and included design of the Kandahar International Airport and Kabul University, and construction of the U.S. Embassy in Laos.

In 1986, PAE was contracted to provide support staff to the United States Embassy in Moscow and Consulate General in Leningrad.

Since 2000, PAE has been responsible for recruiting and hiring elections observers to fill the United States quota to OSCE elections monitoring missions. Under a separate contract with the U.S. State Department, PAE provided almost "all of the logistical support for the deployment of AMIS" (Note: African Union Mission in Sudan) beginning in 2004. In the early 21st century it also supported, via the State Department, ECOWAS missions in Liberia, Sierra Leone, and the Democratic Republic of the Congo.

In 2015, when the U.S. Agency for International Development supported a program by the German NGO Welthungerhilfe to build four ebola treatment centers in Liberia, PAE was awarded contracts for the management of the sites.

In 2017, according to the company, it received a $423 million contract from the State Department to "provide administrative, technical, maintenance, training, safety and logistics/procurement support for the Colombian National Police's" aviation unit.

== See also ==
- Chemonics
