= Fortinet =

American network security corporation

Fortinet, Inc.
- Type: Public
- Traded as: Nasdaq: FTNT; Nasdaq-100 component; S&P 500 component
- Industry: Cloud Security; Cybersecurity; Network Security
- Founded: 2000; 26 years ago
- Founders: Ken Xie; Michael Xie
- Headquarters: Sunnyvale, California, U.S.
- Key people: Ken Xie (CEO); Michael Xie (CTO); Keith Jensen (CFO)
- Products: Fortinet Security Fabric; FortiGate NGFW; FortiGate enterprise; FortiGate carrier; FortiSwitch; FortiAP; FortiWeb; FortiSIEM; FortiSandbox; FortiClient; FortiManager; FortiAnalyzer; FortiEDR; FortiAuthenticator; FortiDeceptor; FortiNAC; FortiGate VM; FortiPAM; FortiCamera; FortiVoice; FortiMail; FortiSOAR; FortiADC; FortiCASB; FortiDDoS; FortiToken; FortiDLP
- Services: Next generation firewalls; Antivirus programs; Intrusion-prevention system; Antispyware; Antispam; VPN; Wireless security; Application control; Web filtering; Security information and event management
- Revenue: ▲US$6.80 billion (2025)
- Net income: ▲US$1.85 billion (2025)
- Number of employees: 14,138 (2024)
- Website: fortinet.com

Fortinet, Inc. is an American cybersecurity company headquartered in Sunnyvale, California. It develops and sells security products including firewalls, endpoint security and intrusion detection systems. Fortinet has offices in the US, Canada, and UK.

Founded in 2000 by brothers Ken Xie and Michael Xie, the company's first and main product was FortiGate, a physical firewall. The company later added wireless access points, sandbox and messaging security. The company went public in November 2009.

== History ==
=== Early history ===
In 2000, Ken Xie and his brother, Michael Xie, co-founded Appligation, Inc., later renaming it ApSecure and ultimately Fortinet (from the phrase "Fortified Networks"). Fortinet introduced its first product, FortiGate, in 2002, followed by anti-spam and anti-virus software.

The company raised $13 million in private funding from 2000 to early 2003. Fortinet's first channel program was established in October 2003. The company began distributing its products in Canada in December 2003 and in the UK in February 2004. By 2004, Fortinet had offices in Asia, Europe, and North America.

=== Growth and expansion ===
Fortinet became profitable in the third quarter of 2008. According to market research firm IDC, by November 2009, Fortinet held over 15 percent of the unified threat management market. Also in 2009, CRN Magazine's survey-based annual report card placed Fortinet first in network security hardware, up from seventh in 2007.

In November 2009, Fortinet had an initial public offering, opening on the NASDAQ Global Market under the ticker symbol FTNT. By the end of the first day of trading, the company had raised $156 million. The company later became listed on the NASDAQ Global Select Market, and became a component of the NASDAQ-100 index in December 2021.

By 2010, Fortinet had $324 million in annual revenues and held the largest share of the unified threat management market according to IDC.

=== Recent history ===
In July 2014, Fortinet announced a technical certification program called the Network Security Expert (NSE) program. In March 2016, Fortinet launched a Network Security Academy to help fill open cybersecurity jobs in the U.S. The company donated equipment and provided universities with information to help train students for jobs in the field. That same year, Fortinet also launched a program called FortiVet to recruit military veterans for cybersecurity jobs.

In January 2017, it was announced that Philip Quade, a former member of the NSA, would become the company's chief information security officer. In 2019, Fortinet's FortiGate SD-WAN and Next Generation Firewall received a "Recommended" rating from NSS Labs.

In September 2021, Fortinet pledged to train one million people in support of President Joe Biden's call to action to address the talent shortage in American cybersecurity. In March 2022, Fortinet announced the termination of operations in Russia. The company has stopped all sales, support, and professional services within Russia. The same year, NetworkWorld reported that Fortinet had introduced AI and ML-based security services utilizing telemetry from its network. In June 2025, Fortinet was added to Investor's Business Daily's Big Cap 20 list of top-rated large-cap growth stocks.

== Acquisitions ==
In 2008, the company acquired the intellectual property of IPLocks, a database security and auditing company. In August 2009, Fortinet acquired the intellectual property and other assets of Woven Systems, an Ethernet switching company.

In December 2012, Fortinet acquired app-hosting service XDN (formerly known as 3Crowd). A year later, Coyote Point, a developer of hardware load balancers, was acquired. In 2015, the company purchased Wi-Fi hardware company Meru Networks, and in June 2016, Fortinet acquired IT security, monitoring, and analytics software vendor AccelOps.

In June 2018, the company acquired Bradford Networks, a maker of access control and IoT security solutions. In October of that year, Fortinet acquired ZoneFox, a threat analytics company. In late 2019, Fortinet acquired enSilo and CyberSponse, and in 2020, Fortinet acquired SASE cloud provider OPAQ Networks, and automated incident management company Panopta.

Cloud and network security firm ShieldX was acquired in March 2021, and in July 2021, the company acquired application security company Sken.Ai to offer continuous application security testing. The company acquired Lacework, a data-driven cloud security company for an undisclosed amount in June 2024. Next DLP, a cloud based DLP provider company, was purchased in August of that year for an undisclosed amount.

In 2025, Fortinet acquired Everest, an Indian company focus in WIFI access points for high density environments.

== Products and research ==
=== Products ===
Fortinet released its first product, FortiGate, a firewall, in 2002, followed by anti-spam and anti-virus software. As functions like anti-spam were added, they were made available in a single product along with the firewall and other functions. FortiGate was updated later to use application-specific integrated circuit (ASIC) architecture. The company has used ASIC in several of its products, including to support its SD-WAN features.

Initially, FortiGate was a physical, rack-mounted product but later became available as a virtual appliance that could run on virtualization platforms such as VMware vSphere.

In April 2016, Fortinet began building its Security Fabric architecture so multiple network security products could communicate as one platform. Later that year, the company added Security Information and Event Management (SIEM) products. In September 2016, the company announced it would integrate the SIEM products with the security systems of other vendors.

In 2017, Fortinet announced the addition of switches, access points, analyzers, sandboxes and cloud capabilities to the Security Fabric, in addition to endpoints and firewalls. Later in 2017, Fortinet created a standalone subsidiary, Fortinet Federal, to develop cybersecurity products for government agencies. Fortinet has received security effectiveness certifications through NSS Labs.

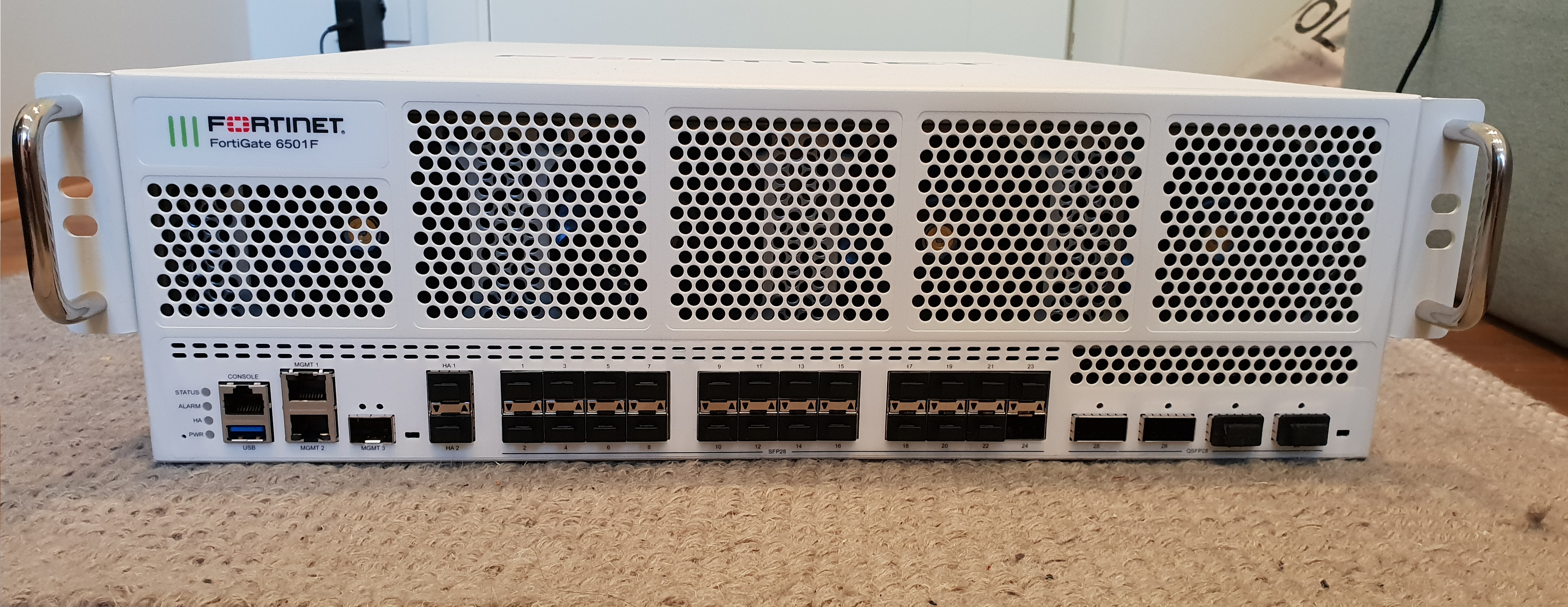
FortiGate 6501F

In 2019, Fortinet grew to 21,000 WAN edge customers, according to a Gartner report. In February 2020, Fortinet released FortiAI, a threat-detection program that uses artificial intelligence. In July 2020, Fortinet launched multi-cloud SD-WAN. That year, BT Security selected Fortinet and other Threat Alliance members as Critical Partners.

In 2026, Fortinet earned a Gold Award in Safety & Security from Control Engineering for its FortiGate Rugged 70G.

=== Vulnerabilities and credential leaks ===
In September 2021, almost 500,000 login names and passwords for Fortinet VPN devices were published on a hacking forum. The credentials were allegedly scraped from devices vulnerable to a 2018 exploit (CVE-2018-13379).

In January 2025, the credentials and configuration files of over 15,000 FortiGate devices were leaked on a hacking forum. The data is believed to have been obtained from devices vulnerable to a 2022 exploit (CVE-2022–40684). In November 2025, a critical vulnerability (CVE-2025-64446, 9.1 CVSS) became public affecting FortiWeb Web Application Firewall. The vulnerability allowed attackers to gain full control over the device by exploiting a path traversal vulnerability combined with an authentication bypass.

In June 2026, security researcher Volodymyr "Bob" Diachenko of SecurityDiscovery.com reported that he had gained access to a threat actor's infrastructure containing credentials for about 74,000 internet-facing FortiGate firewalls and VPN gateways across 194 countries, associated with 21,632 domains; the dataset was dubbed "FortiBleed". According to researchers, a Russian-speaking, financially motivated group sprayed FortiGate login endpoints with password combinations, intercepted SSL VPN authentication hashes and cracked them on a 45-GPU cluster, then used the recovered passwords to move into victims' internal networks, including Active Directory environments. Hudson Rock said the affected organizations included large corporations, government agencies and a Turkish NATO defense contractor from which classified documents had been exfiltrated. The cybersecurity firm SOCRadar later raised its estimate to 86,644 affected devices and linked the operation's infrastructure to the Lynx and INC ransomware groups. The US Cybersecurity and Infrastructure Security Agency, the UK National Cyber Security Centre and the Australian Cyber Security Centre issued advisories urging affected organizations to reset credentials and enable multi-factor authentication. Fortinet stated that the activity did not involve a new vulnerability, attributing it to the reuse of credentials from earlier incidents and to brute-force attacks against devices with weak passwords and no multi-factor authentication.

=== Cybersecurity research ===
In 2005, Fortinet created the FortiGuard Labs internal security research team. By 2014, Fortinet had four research and development centers in Asia, as well as others in the US, Canada and France. In March 2014, Fortinet founded the Cyber Threat Alliance (CTA) with Palo Alto Networks in order to share security threat data across vendors. It was later joined by McAfee and Symantec. In 2015, the CTA published a white paper on the CryptoWall ransomware, which detailed how attackers obtained $325 million through ransoms paid by victims to regain access to their files.

In April 2015, Fortinet provided threat intelligence to Interpol in order to help apprehend the ringleader of several online scams based in Nigeria. The scams, which resulted in compromise of business emails and CEO fraud, had cost one business over $15 million. The following year, in March 2016, Fortinet and Cisco joined NATO in a data-sharing agreement to improve their information security capabilities. Fortinet researchers discovered a spyware that scammed victims by impersonating the IRS. Also in 2017, researchers helped identify malware, called Rootnik, and ransomware, called MacRansom, that targeted Android and MacOS systems respectively.

== Controversies ==
In May 2004, Trend Micro filed a legal complaint against Fortinet, alleging the FortiGate product line violated their U.S. patent on server-based antivirus technology. Though the International Trade Commission initially ruled against Fortinet, the Trend Micro patents at the center of the dispute were later declared invalid in 2010.

In April 2005, a German court issued a preliminary injunction against Fortinet's UK subsidiary in relation to source code for its GPL-licensed elements. The dispute ended a month later after Fortinet agreed to make the source code available upon request.

In October 2005, an OpenNet study suggested that the military government of Myanmar, which was under which at the time was subject to U.S. sanctions for human rights violations, had begun using Fortinet's FortiGuard system for internet censorship. Fortinet stated that their products are sold by third-party resellers and that they acknowledged US embargoes; however, their sales director participated in a ceremony to deliver the firewall product to the prime minister.

In September 2019, Fortinet settled a whistleblower lawsuit regarding what the company has described as an "isolated incident" of sales of intentionally mislabeled Chinese-made equipment to U.S. government end users.

In 2023, Fortinet Fortiguard devices were revealed by Microsoft and members of the Five Eyes intelligence network to be the subject of a wide-ranging and ongoing cyberattack by a state-sponsored entity in China.

In September 2024, reports surfaced of an unknown person going by the nickname "Fortibitch" posting to an unnamed hacking forum that they allegedly stole 440 gigabytes of data from Fortinet's Microsoft SharePoint server. Fortinet confirmed the data breach to Bleeping Computer and said that the data breach included "limited data related to a small number of Fortinet customers".
