= Jeffrey Peterson =

American technology entrepreneur

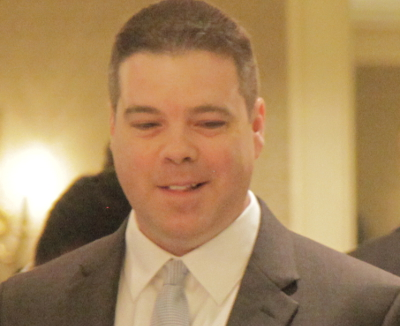
- Born: October 11, 1972 (age 54); Santa Barbara, California; United States
- Occupation: Technology entrepreneur
- Years active: 1997–present
- Known for: Hispanic Internet pioneer
- Political party: Democratic Party (Before 2016); Independent (2016–present)
- Call sign: KF7QGF
- Website: jeffreypeterson.com

Jeffrey Peterson (born October 11, 1972, in Santa Barbara, California) is an American technology entrepreneur and California born millionaire who is considered the pioneer of Hispanic internet in the United States. He is best known as the founder of Quepasa, the first Latin American online community to go public and trade on a stock exchange in the early dot-com internet era of the late 1990s. In 2012, Quepasa changed its corporate name to MeetMe and continued trading on the Nasdaq Stock Market under ticker symbol Nasdaq: MEET. MeetMe subsequently acquired the Skout, if(we), Tagged, and hi5 social networks and internet brands. As of mid 2018, renamed parent company the Meet Group had a market value of about U.S. $300 million.

== Early life and education ==
Peterson grew up in Santa Barbara, California. As a son of British mother and an American father, his paternal ancestors emigrated to Santa Barbara from Spain. Peterson was educated at public schools in the Santa Barbara area. He was raised next door to the director of the University of California, Santa Barbara computer laboratory, who introduced him to computer programming at an early age in 1978.

In 2017, Peterson's life story was featured in a book written by motivational speaker Brian Tracy about entrepreneurs. Peterson spent much of his early childhood remotely connecting to the UCSB mainframe computers via terminal and modem. Through early access to technology, Peterson learned to make his own Unix and VMS–based software applications on the campus PDP-11 and DEC VAX computer systems. In the early years of computing, the largely technical science of programming was a pastime overrun by the likes of college professors and engineers. To fit in, Peterson reportedly maintained an identity for login on the MIT Artificial Intelligence Laboratory PDP-10, where he was known by his peers as "Dr. Jeffrey Peterson", at the age of eleven.

In 1981, Peterson landed his first job, as a troubleshooter for a software company focused on Commodore computers. In 1983, he worked as a product tester for vintage hardware manufacturer LOBO Systems. During the mid-1980s, Peterson focused on the development of software for freely distributed bulletin board system and multi-user dungeon gaming applications. He was known among his colleagues as an expert at implementing customized kernel-level multitasking solutions, who regularly pushed early hardware beyond traditional limits. Peterson, already a seasoned assembly and C language developer in his early years, contributed heavily to the emerging F/OSS programming communities of the 1980s. He has published numerous texts, including articles on multiprocessing, quasi-empirical methods, and artificial intelligence.

Peterson was ridiculed about his early programming years in a satirical article published by TheStreet.com in 2004. The article, which highlights Peterson's public biography as filled in a Quepasa proxy statement on April 23, 2004, was suspicious about believing that he was programming computers when he was ten years old. Nonetheless, Peterson is credited at this age as a contributor on the inside cover of a best selling microcomputer software book in 1983.

Well acquainted with the college scene from his earlier programming years, Peterson worked as a disc jockey at UCSB college radio station KCSB-FM from 1986 to 1990. During the late 1980s, Peterson held the position of "traffic manager" on the sixteen-member executive committee at college radio station KCSB-FM that gave both Jim Rome and Sean Hannity their first radio broadcasting jobs.

Peterson dropped out of high school in 1988 at age 16, to pursue his career in investments. He continued postliminary studies in the areas of law and history.

== Career ==
=== Wall Street years ===
In 1989, Peterson started his first job at a Wall Street investment firm, Lehman Brothers, where he learned about the stock market. He would later pass the industry exams, becoming a stockbroker at age nineteen. After working for several Wall Street firms, he landed in the field of investment banking, where he gained experience in corporate finance. Peterson would go on to work with investment groups that financed hundreds of companies primarily through initial public offering transactions during the strong stock market conditions of the early 1990s.

=== Quepasa.com ===
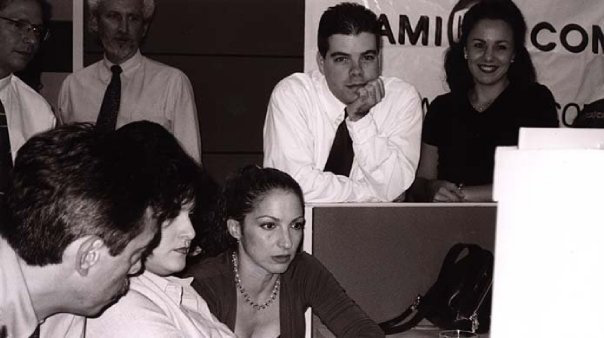
Jeffrey Peterson and Quepasa spokesperson Gloria Estefan at the Miami Herald in 1999

In 1997, Peterson founded Quepasa.com, Inc. The website was the first major online community to focus on United States Hispanic Internet users. A year later, he successfully persuaded Arizona sports mogul Jerry Colangelo to help raise in excess of $20 million of seed capital to launch the company. Phoenix Suns star Jason Kidd signed on as an investor as well as the former Denver Broncos quarterback John Elway, investing $500,000.

Within months, Costa Rican President José María Figueres joined the Quepasa board of directors. Peterson went on to sell a stake in the Spanish language website to Sony Pictures Entertainment and Telemundo LLC. CNBC chief business commentator and former FDIC chairman L. William Seidman joined Quepasa's board of directors. After meeting with Peterson during an online interview at the offices of the Miami Herald, seven-time GRAMMY award-winning Latina recording artist Gloria Estefan signed a contract to become Quepasa's official spokesperson and investor. Quepasa billboards were a frequent sight in Hispanic cities across the United States, encouraging millions of Latinos to join "El Mundo Nuevo" (Spanish: The New World) online.

On June 24, 1999, Quepasa went public on the Nasdaq stock market. By the end of the day, Quepasa was worth $272 million. The young company founder was featured in live interviews on CNN and CNBC. At age 26, Peterson had seen his net worth rise by $36 million.

A year later, Quepasa was named the most popular online destination for United States Hispanics, ahead of competitors Starmedia and Yahoo! Espanol.

=== Vayala Corporation ===
In July 2001, Peterson founded an Internet search company called Vayala Corporation, together with Brian Long Lu, son of Asian technology mogul Hong Liang Lu, and Mike Marriott. Vayala, a developer of large scale dynamic search technologies, was successful in securing venture capital financing with executives of Softbank Corp. In 2002, Vayala was acquired by Quepasa.

During this time, The Arizona Republic ran a photo of Peterson on the front cover of the Sunday edition, in a three-part feature about his career. The series ran on September 9–10, 2001, concluding on September 11, 2001.

=== Quepasa takeover and resurrection ===
By 2002, Quepasa shares had declined in value under the leadership of Trujillo. In media reports, Trujillo blamed the decline in Quepasa's market value on unfavorable market conditions and the ".com bubble". The Chicago Tribune wrote that "even with Internet Winter blowing cold wind across the digital landscape, many experts were surprised to hear the death rattle of America's once successful hispanic-centered Web operation, Quepasa.com." Later that year, Peterson led a group of investors through a proxy fight and hostile takeover of Quepasa, reportedly investing millions of his own money. Shortly after the takeover, Peterson was again named chairman and chief executive of Quepasa.

In January 2004, the Business Journal of Phoenix reported that Quepasa was in the midst of a revival led by Jeffrey himself. By 2006, Quepasa shares had increased in value by $150 million.

On November 5, 2006, Peterson again left the company, after selling 30% of Quepasa to then-multimillionaire investor Richard Scott, who would later become Governor of Florida.

=== Mobile Corporation ===
In April 2013, Peterson and Quepasa cofounder Michael Silberman launched Mobile Corporation. The company was a start-up venture focused on developing a freelancing platform for Mobile technology.

According to filings with the Securities and Exchange Commission, notable board members of Mobile Corporation included Univision Online CEO Javier Saralegui, son of Atari founder Nolan Bushnell, Brent Bushnell, former U.S. Attorney Dennis Burke and Senior Advisor to Mexican billionaire Carlos Slim, Marco A. López Jr.

Notable investors in Mobile Corporation included the venture fund of the Silicon Valley–based Wilson Sonsini Goodrich & Rosati law firm, Salt Lake City businessman Phil Marriott, Texas land Commissioner George P. Bush, and Prorsus Capital.

Mobile established a headquarters office in Cambridge, Massachusetts. Shortly thereafter, the company began developing branch offices at Plaza Carso in Mexico City, in Nogales, Sonora Mexico, and in the Philippines.

In August 2014, Mobile Corporation announced that "working together with its investor and intellectual property partner" it had acquired the internet domain name Mobile.co, at $239,000, the second largest ".co" domain sale in history at the time, after Overstock.com (o.co) at $350,000. The Mobile.co domain acquisition, performed by Peterson's investment company, gave rise to complex litigation including a highly publicized UDRP dispute. In an interview, Peterson stated that the original purchase price of the Mobile.co internet domain was $50,000, but the domain seller refused to complete the transfer after he learned who Peterson was, and instead demanded more money. When the UDRP dispute failed, Peterson initiated litigation in federal court and several international venues to secure the domain transfer. The litigation was followed by technology press and domain industry blogs. Shortly after the successful acquisition of Mobile.co, Peterson announced "we have acquired over 30 mobile related [internet domain] names over the last six months."

On October 10, 2014, Mobile Corporation named former U.S. Presidential Candidate and Democratic National Committee Chairman Governor Howard Dean as its Global Advocate. Dean, the previous Governor of Vermont, also joined the Advisory Board.

By 2015, Mobile had developed a fully operational Mobile freelancing platform.

In 2016, Mobile Corporation entered in to a definitive agreement to go public on the Toronto Stock Exchange through a merger transaction. The going-public transaction was not completed, with Mobile remaining a private company. In 2018, Peterson attributed the unsuccessful public transaction to "a combination of market conditions, regulatory issues and problems with former Board members." As of mid-2018, Peterson remained the chairman and CEO of Mobile Corporation.

=== Management controversies and litigation ===
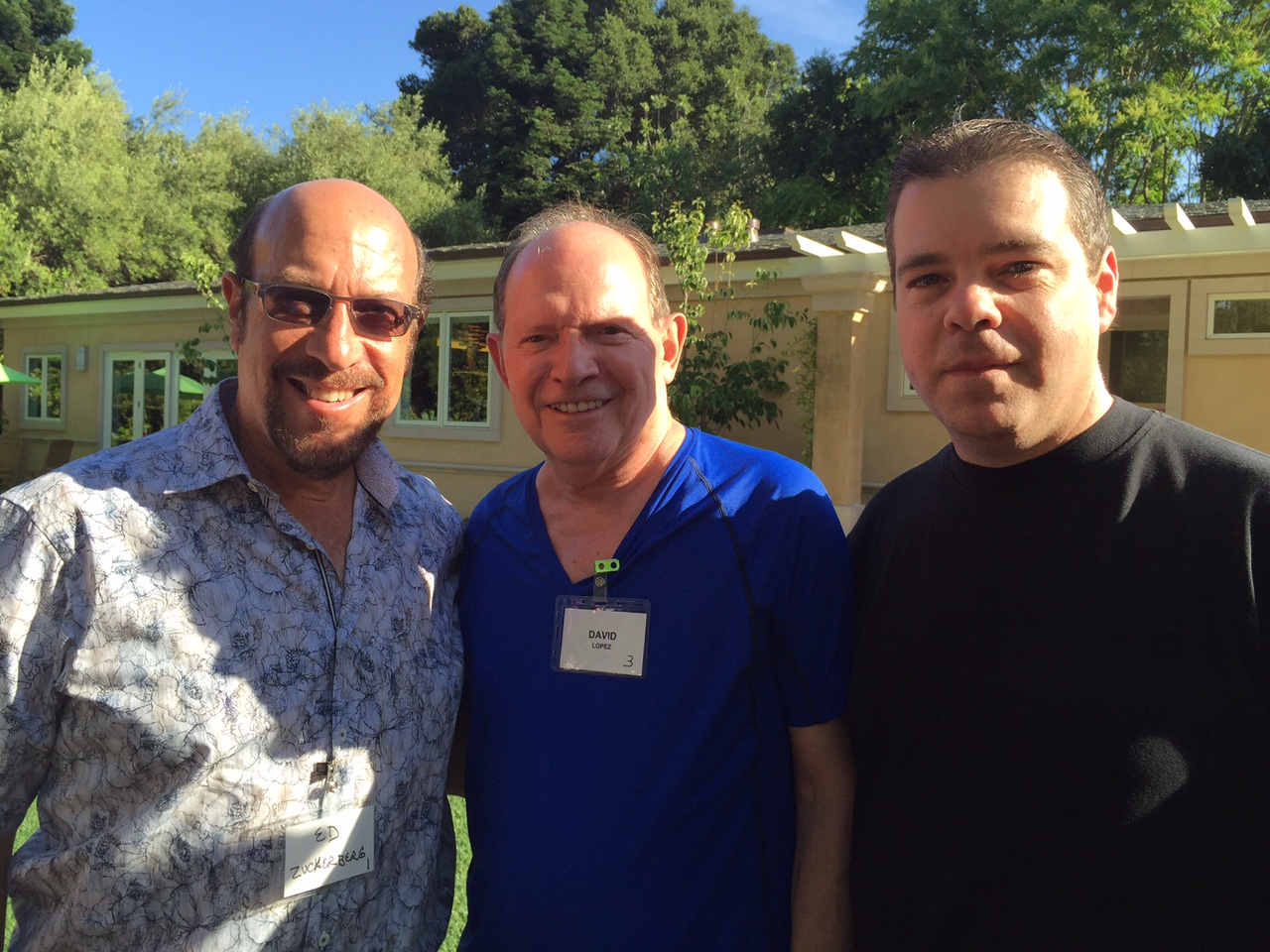
Jeffrey Peterson with David Lopez, father of Latina singer and actress Jennifer Lopez, and Edward Zuckerberg in 2014

In July 1999, shortly after the Quepasa public offering, Peterson was ousted from the company by Gary Trujillo, the new CEO that Peterson hired to run Quepasa sixty days prior to the incident. Speaking about the surprise management coup to the Arizona Republic newspaper, Peterson stated that Trujillo had "breached every ounce of his trust." In a lawsuit filed in Maricopa County Superior Court, Peterson was accused of competing with Quepasa. The lawsuit was settled 90 days later, with Quepasa paying $2.4 million to Peterson. Trujillo would later concede that the problem was of a "personality issue." Peterson resigned from the board of directors, still remaining Quepasa's largest single shareholder. According to news reports at the time, When Peterson resigned from Quepasa after settling the lawsuit, the company was left in the hands of a chief executive officer and a board of directors inexperienced in both the Internet and the technology that ran it.

In 2017, an article in the Arizona Republic newspaper questioned numerous disagreements with members of Peterson's board of directors. The article made public a dispute between Peterson and David Lopez, the father of Latina actress and musician Jennifer Lopez. Peterson's Quepasa had previously contracted with the J.Lo by Jennifer Lopez clothing line.

In December 2018, Peterson filed a $100 million defamation lawsuit in the U.S. District Court for Massachusetts against the Arizona Republic, parent company Gannett, reporter Craig Harris, and Dennis Burke, a former business colleague Peterson accuses of orchestrating an allegedly factually incorrect newspaper article as part of an "ongoing retaliatory campaign." According to Peterson's lawsuit, Burke, who resigned in 2011 as U.S. Attorney for the District of Arizona amid allegations of misconduct, had a history of improper retaliation against coworkers and attempted to manipulate the press by leaking documents in the Obama-era Operation Fast and Furious scandal. Peterson attributed his lawsuit against Burke to "a disgruntled former colleague who is a former federal prosecutor apparently willing to use his knowledge of prosecutorial methods to implement various schemes based on lies, innuendo and half truths meant to destabilize our business projects and create the false appearance of wrongs in order to cover up Burke's own bad acts."

== Political activities ==
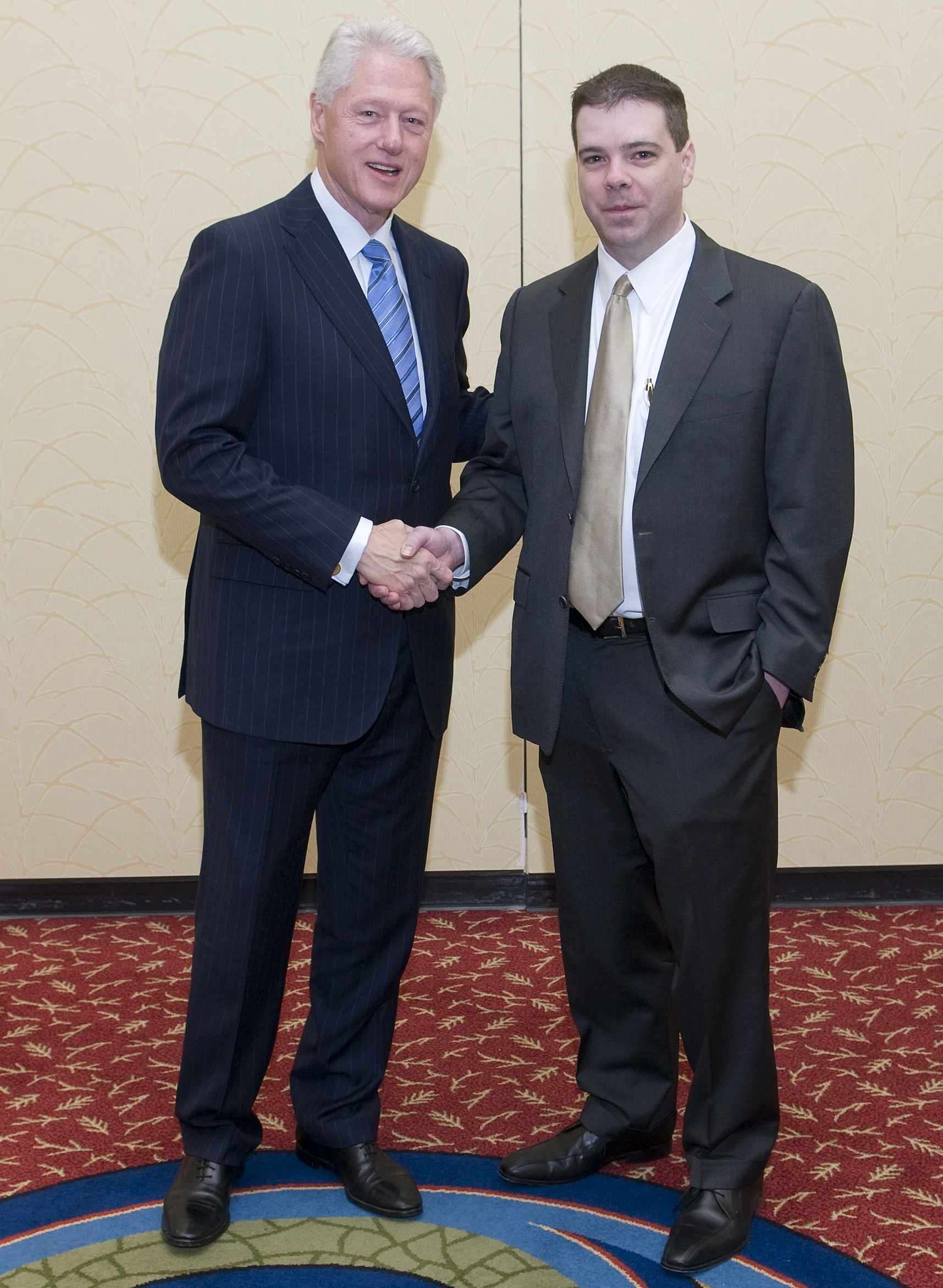
Jeffrey Peterson with President Bill Clinton in 2010

Peterson, a Democrat, has been involved in political circles. His political affiliations have often been related to Hispanic interests. According to an article published in the Arizona Republic newspaper, Peterson is a close associate of Hispanic marketing executive Lionel Sosa.

=== Arizona ===
In 2003, Peterson was appointed to the Arizona–Mexico Commission by former Arizona Governor Janet Napolitano. By 2005, he had been appointed to the Executive Committee.

In 2005, Peterson was appointed to the cross-border transactions committee of the Arizona Department of Real Estate. The committee is focused on international real estate transactions between residents of Arizona and Mexico. In the same year, he was appointed as the chairman of the Technology Subcommittee of the 2006 Executive Bond Committee, by Phoenix Mayor Phil Gordon. The $850 million bond initiative was approved by voters in March 2006. He also financially supported the March 25, 2006, and April 10, 2006, reform marches organized by immigrants and he was a co-host at a June 1, 2006, fundraiser for Arizona Senatorial candidate Jim Pederson, featuring former president, Bill Clinton. Jeffrey held a fundraiser at his residence for Barack Obama featuring Democratic National Committee Chairman Howard Dean and actress Scarlett Johansson on August 21, 2008. Peterson was named as a co-host at an October 19, 2016 fundraising event for Democratic candidate Hillary Clinton featuring Chelsea Clinton at a private residence in Phoenix.

According to Maricopa County's property records, Peterson owned a residence in the same condominium as Arizona Senator John McCain.

=== Washington, D.C. ===
In 2013, Peterson was appointed to the board of directors of the U.S. Philippines Society, a Washington, D.C.–based private sector initiative chaired by U.S. Ambassador John Negroponte and former AIG Chairman Maurice "Hank" Greenberg. A prominent picture of Peterson with Benigno Aquino III, former president of the Philippines, was set at the Malacañang Palace and featured in a 2017 print publication.

=== Skybridge activism ===
On February 10, 2021, Peterson appeared in a cable television news segment, questioning influence of the Mexican Institutional Revolutionary Party on Skybridge Arizona, the first American cross-border cargo port with 'pre-authorization screening' between the United States and Mexico.

== Hollywood ties ==
Peterson signed Gloria Estefan as Quepasa's spokesperson and investor in 1999. Movie producer Paul Mazursky was an investor in Peterson's startup, Vayala Corp. A newspaper article associated Peterson with Hawk Koch, former president of the Academy of Motion Picture Arts and Sciences. The co-founder of rock band Dishwalla is listed as a member of the board of directors in an early Quepasa registration statement. Peterson is a childhood friend of rap music producer Damizza. In September 2005, Quepasa announced a marketing deal with Jennifer Lopez. Former Van Halen lead singer Sammy Hagar, founder of the Mexican tequila brand, Cabo Wabo, was reported to have forged ties with Peterson's Quepasa.

== Career activities ==
Peterson is considered to be amongst the top authorities on Hispanic Internet culture in the United States. He maintains a presence in a number of IT industry advisory roles. Peterson serves on the Hispanic committee of the Interactive Advertising Bureau in New York City. According to his public biography, he acts as a technology consultant to the Federal government of Mexico.

In 2007, a scholarship fund was established at the University of Texas, San Antonio, in Peterson's name. The fund grants scholarships to Hispanic students pursuing technology related degrees.

Peterson, together with former MySpace CEO Richard Rosenblatt and PayPal co-founder Peter Thiel, was reported to be among the founding investors of Vator, with his $250,000 angel investment in the start-up company led by Filipina-American entrepreneur and former CBS Marketwatch lead internet reporter Bambi Francisco in May 2007.

On July 20, 2009, Peterson sold the Internet domain name demand.com to Demand Media Inc., a company controlled by former Myspace Chairman Richard Rosenblatt.

In 2017, Peterson was credited as a producer of a biographical film about entrepreneur and best-selling author Jack Canfield.
