= Quepasa =

Social media technology company

Quepasa Corporation
- Company type: Public; Previous Stock Symbol (NYSE: QPSA)
- Available in: Spanish; English; Portuguese
- Founded: 1997
- Area served: USA, Latin America
- Founders: Jeffrey Peterson; Michael Silberman, EVP, CFO
- Key people: John Abbott, CEO; Michael Matte, CFO; Louis Bardov, CTO
- Industry: Social media
- Employees: ~75 (2006)
- Website: quepasa.com
- Commercial: Yes
- Registration: Free
- Users: ▲32 million (March 3, 2011)
- Current status: Offline

Quepasa Corporation was a US-based social media technology company catering to Latino Audiences worldwide. Quepasa owned and operated Quepasa.com, a social network, Quepasa Games (formerly Techfront), a social game development studio, and Quepasa Contests, a social media advertising solution (formerly Quepasa DSM). Initially founded as a Hispanic web portal and later revived by its founder as a social network that grew to over 30 million users, Quepasa was the first publicly traded company focused on the bilingual English/Spanish language U.S. Hispanic internet demographic.

In 2012, Quepasa suspended operations after a $100 million acquisition, name change and sale to MeetMe.

== About ==
Founded in Phoenix, Arizona, and later with headquarters in West Palm Beach, Florida (with offices in Scottsdale, Dallas, Los Angeles, Miami and Mexico), Quepasa Corporation owned Quepasa.com, one of the world's largest, bicultural and bilingual Latino Social Networks on-line. Quepasa.com, and sister site Corazones.com served users in the U.S., Mexico, Latin America and the world in Spanish, English, and Portuguese. In July, 2011, the company merged with teen social network myYearbook

== History ==
Quepasa Corporation was founded by Jeffrey Peterson and co-founded by Michael Silberman in 1997. The company was headquartered in Phoenix, Arizona, with offices in Los Angeles, California and West Palm Beach, Florida.

In 1998 Quepasa raised US$20 million from private investors, including television broadcaster Telemundo and Phoenix sports businessman Jerry Colangelo. Costa Rican president Jose Maria Figueres and former CNBC chief business commentator William Siedman joined the board of directors.

Quepasa had its initial public offering on the Nasdaq Stock Market on June 24, 1999, selling 4.6 million shares at $12 per share. During the first two weeks the value increased to $26 per share. By July 1999, Quepasa had raised over $100 million. Quepasa shares registered billions of dollars per month in trading volume on Nasdaq during the dot-com Internet boom.

In July 2011, the company led a merger with myYearbook a teen focused social network.

=== Growth ===
In 1999 Quepasa invested tens of millions of dollars in thousands of outdoor Spanish-language billboard advertisements, network radio promotions and various national television brand-building campaigns featuring the music of its corporate spokesperson and investor, Gloria Estefan.

At the peak of the Internet boom in the year 2000, market research firm Cheskin Research ranked Quepasa as the most popular destination for U.S. Hispanics, despite costly marketing campaigns by Starmedia and Terra. Shares of Quepasa rose on Nasdaq to a market value of $400 million at their peak.

In 2010, an article published by Adweek noted "record setting numbers for Quepasa" in a "fierce latin social networking climate" with Facebook, Hi5, Tagged.com, Sonico and others.

In 2011 Quepasa announced a partnership with PRISA Digital, a Spanish media conglomerate. The agreement designates PRISA as a reseller of Quepasa advertising products.

In 2011, Quepasa also acquired XtFt Games, owner of Brazil-based social game development studio TechFront. In May 2011 Quepasa launched its first social gaming title after the acquisition, Wonderful City - Rio, on Quepasa.com and Orkut.com. Quepasa launched the game in partnership with Mentez, a Latin American-focused social network game publisher based in Miami.

=== Management controversy ===
Shortly after Quepasa went public in late 1999, Quepasa founder Jeffrey Peterson was ousted by a new CEO while co-founder Michael Silberman remained during a short transition period.

During the .com bust of 2001, Quepasa shares lost practically all of their value on Nasdaq. When existing management attempted to liquidate company assets, Peterson with Silberman gained control of Quepasa through a successful hostile takeover and proxy fight subsequent to a lawsuit filed against the company and the current board of directors by Silberman. Peterson was reinstated in 2002 as chairman and CEO and Silberman as the executive vice president, chief financial officer and secretary of the company. The company was rebuilt and the share value during the following two-year period increased to $12 per share.

=== Events ===
- June, 1997: Quepasa is incorporated as Internet Century Inc. The business is initially operated as a high end web applications developer, with offices in Las Vegas, Nevada, and Los Angeles, California.
- December 18, 1998: Changes name to Quepasa.com, Inc.
- June 24, 1999: Quepasa goes public on Nasdaq, selling 4 million shares at $12.
- August 2, 1999: New Quepasa CEO Gary Trujillo fires founder Peterson, accusing him of starting a competing venture.
- September, 1999: Quepasa signs Gloria Estefan as its spokesperson, partner, and investor
- March, 2000: Gateway Computer invests $10 million in Quepasa
- April 17, 2000: Cheskin Research ranks Quepasa as #1 for U.S. Hispanics online
- June, 2002: Founder Jeffrey Peterson and co-founder Michael Silberman again gain control of Quepasa through a takeover, reorganizing the business
- December, 2002: co-founder Michael Silberman resigns as executive vice president, chief financial officer, and secretary and is appointed as the chairman of the audit committee by the board of directors.
- August, 2005: Quepasa launches its social network site, allowing users to switch between its news portal and the social site, formerly named w1 because it used to reside in subdomain (www1.quepasa.com).
- March, 2006: Billionaire investor Richard Scott acquires stake in Quepasa

=== First publicly traded social network ===
In 2010 and 2011, several media publications reported that Quepasa was the "only publicly traded social network" meaning Quepasa was the only social network trading on a stock exchange at that time.

Later in 2011, an article claimed that following its initial public offering on May 4, 2011, Renren became the first publicly traded social network. Yet at the time of RenRen's IPO, Quepasa was already a well-known publicly traded company with over 30 million users on its social network that had been operating since at least 2006.

This is especially noteworthy as the initial public offering for the best-known social network in history, Facebook, was Friday, May 18, 2012, a year after RenRen's IPO. If these historical dates prove correct, Quepasa may have been the first social network to go public and trade on a stock exchange in history.
