= Brasil Game Show =

Video game convention

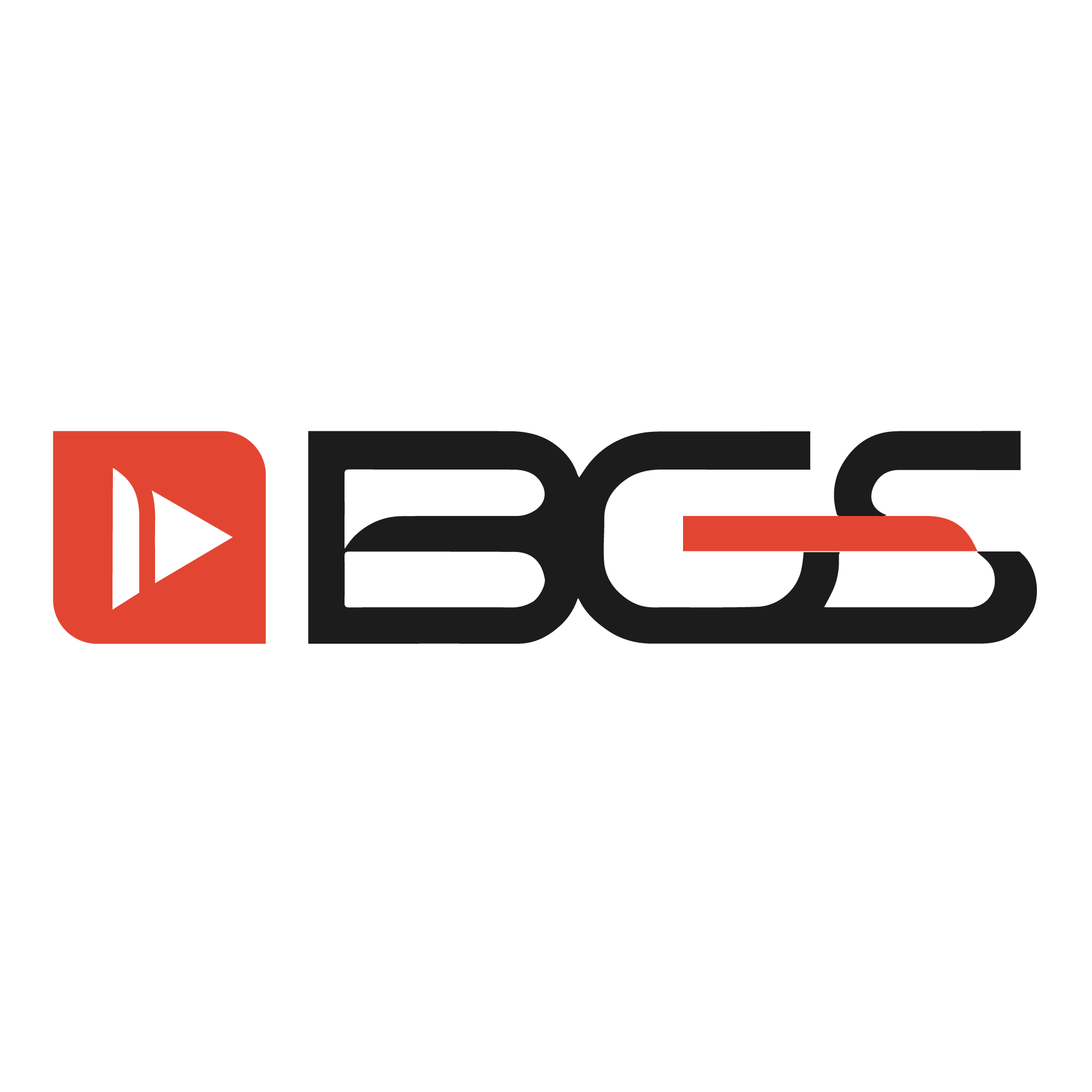
- Nickname: BGS
- Status: Active
- Genre: Video games
- Venue: Expo Center Norte
- Locations: São Paulo, São Paulo
- Coordinates: 23.511366°S 46.612562°W
- Country: Brazil
- Years active: 2009-Present
- Inaugurated: 21 June 2009; 17 years ago
- Most recent: 9 October 2025; 12 months ago
- Next event: 9 October 2026; 26 days ago
- Attendance: ▲325,000 (2018)
- Organizer: Marcelo Tavares
- Sponsors: Banco do Brasil
- Website: www.brasilgameshow.com.br

Brasil Game Show (BGS) is a yearly Brazilian video game convention organized by business executive Marcelo Tavares, that is currently held in São Paulo and is the largest gaming convention in Latin America and one of the largest in the world. It was originally titled Rio Game Show (RGS).

The first edition of the event was held on June 21, 2009 in Rio de Janeiro, with an attendance of 4,000. Since moving from Rio de Janeiro to São Paulo, the event has been held at the Expo Center Norte, in the Vila Guilherme district of the city.

== History ==
Brasil Game Show was first held on June 21, 2009, in Rio de Janeiro where it ran under the name of Rio Game Show and had an attendance of 4,000 participants. Until that year, Brazil had been holding no similar events for about 3 years. The attendance doubled in the second edition, November 28 and 29, 2009. In the following year the convention retitled itself to the current name of Brasil Game Show and had an attendance of 30,000 convention goers. In 2011 the convention received over 60,000 convention goers, exceeding the 50,000 attendees expectation for that year.

Still in 2011, it was announced that the 2012 convention would be held in São Paulo.

In 2012 the expectation was of about 80,000 visitors for the convention. But the Event once again exceeded expectations, hitting the 100,000 attendees mark and consolidating its biggest Latin American games convention title.

The 2013 edition was held in São Paulo, October 25 (press only), 26, 27, 28 and 29 (open to the public). The expectations of 150,000 attendees were once again exceeded and the space allocated to the convention was doubled in comparison with the previous year.

In 2014, the space allocated to the Event was once again doubled, and took all five pavilions of Expo Center Norte, in São Paulo. The Event occurred on October 8 (press and business only), 9, 10, 11 and 12 (open to the public), and there was an estimated attendance of 250,000. Until half March, big companies had already announced their presence in the Event, like Ubisoft, Ongame, Razer and others.

== Events ==
Dates	Venue	Unique Attendees	Some of the Guests
June 21, 2009	Rio de Janeiro	4,000	-
November 28–29, 2009	Rio de Janeiro	8,000	-
November 20–21, 2010	SulAmerica Convention Center, Rio de Janeiro	30,000	Sony, Warner, Blizzard, NC Games, Seven Computação Gráfica, Warner, Mauricio de Sousa
October 5–9, 2011	Rio de Janeiro	63,119	Sony, NC Games, Seven Computação Gráfica, Microsoft, M-Coin, Vostu, Hazit Online Games, Level-up!, Mentez, Warner, EA, Codemasters, Yoshinori Ono, Zafer Coban
October 11–14, 2012	Expo Center Norte, São Paulo	100,599	Sony, Microsoft, Nintendo, Riot Games, Activision, Konami, Warner Games, EA, Codemasters, Capcom, Ecogames, Gamérica, NC Games, Level Up!, ZAP Games, Razer, Hoplon Infotainment, AMD, House Games, Razor Games, 1337 Entertainment, Global Collect, The Castle Builder, PlayTV, 3D Voyage, Action Prime Games, Disney, Insane Media, Gametel, LG, Incomm, Baixaki, Rocket Store
October 25–29, 2013	Expo Center Norte, São Paulo	151,564	Sony, Seven Computação Gráfica, Warner Games, Activision, EA, Blizzard Entertainment, NVidia, Razer, Level Up!, Hoplon Infotainment, NC Games, Ubisoft, Kingston, Baixaki, Install Core, Incomm, InnoGames, Rixty, PlayTV, Furfle, Corsair, Game Insight
October 8–12, 2014	Expo Center Norte, São Paulo	252,966	Razer, Ongame, Ubisoft, Mad Catz, Playphone, Kingston, Tanki Online, EA
October 8–12, 2015	Expo Center Norte, São Paulo	300,138	PlayStation, Xbox, Ubisoft, Capcom, EA, Warner Bros. Games, Activision, Razer, HP, Mad Catz, Nvidia, EVGA, Azubu, YouTube, Rixty, Taiwan Excellence Awards, Com2uS, Gunnar Optiks, Planeta DeAgostini, Lojas Americanas, Copag, Minecraft
September 1–5, 2016	Expo Center Norte, São Paulo	301,136	PlayStation, Xbox, Capcom, Razer, Livraria Saraiva, Warner Bros. Games, Supercell, Ubisoft, Kingston, EA, Gigabyte
October 11–15, 2017	Expo Center Norte, São Paulo	More than 317,000	PlayStation, Xbox, Livraria Saraiva, Vivo, Samsung, Activision, RedFox Games, HyperX, Lojas Americanas, Ubisoft, Intel, Warner Bros. Games, Acer, AORUS/Gigabyte, Canon, CD Projekt Red, Com2uS, Dazz, DXRacer, Kinoplex, KOCCA, Piticas, Razer, Supercell, Cinemark, Dell, Fini, TNT Energy Drink, Casas Bahia, Cup Noodles
October 10–14, 2018	Expo Center Norte, São Paulo	325,000	Banco do Brasil, Cube TV, 2 AM, Cinemark, Fini, PlayStation, Free Fire, Cup Noodles, TNT, Activision, HyperX, Logitech, Xbox, Lojas Americanas, Nintendo, PUBG, RedFox Games, Riachuelo Geek, Samsung, WB Games, YouTube Gaming, AORUS/Gigabyte, Corsair, Dazz, GameMax, Intel, Mixer, Piticas, Razer, Warrior, Crokíssimo, DXRacer, Lenovo, Magic: The Gathering, Nerd ao Cubo, Nvidia, OEX Game, Old Spice, Pichau, Pontofrio, Rawar, StreamCraft, Zona Criativa
October 10–13, 2019	Expo Center Norte, São Paulo	325,078	Epic Games, YouTube, Xbox, Nintendo, PlayStation, Facebook, Logitech, WB Games, Acer, Aorus, Asus, DxRacer, Piticas, Falkol, Warrior, Razer, Pichau Gaming, Intel, Corsair, Legion by Lenovo, Marvel, Kalunga Red Canids, Fanta, Lupo, Sunny, Redragon, OexGame, MicroCamp, Magic: The Gathering, Panini, Matic Entretenimento, Dazz, Saga, Veloe, Fini, Free Fire, Submarino, Western Digital, Dell Gaming, Gillette, Old Spice, Magazine Luiza, Outback SteakHouse, Banco do Brasil, TNT Energy Drink, Vivo, Smilegate Entertainment, AOC, Cup Noodles, HyperX
October 6-12, 2022	Expo Center Norte, São Paulo	-	
