= If(we) =

American technology company

if(we)
- Available in: English
- Owner: The Meet Group
- CEO: Dash Gopinath
- Employees: 150 (October 2011)
- Website: www.ifwe.co
- Launched: October 2004; 22 years ago

if(we) is a social and mobile technology company based in San Francisco, California and owned by The Meet Group. It was originally known as Tagged Inc. and owns and operates social networks Tagged.com and Hi5.com and animated iOS messaging app Nod.

The company operates as an incubator of new social technology and apps seeking to find the next big thing. The firm has been ranked the #3 Best Place to Work in the Bay Area for medium size companies and has 140 employees.

== History ==
The company was created when it acquired Tinode and announced that it would begin working on additional social products besides Tagged and Hi5. It also announced that it would drop plans of pursuing an IPO and concentrate on new social opportunities. If(we) is planning to release a messaging app as its first new product. The company had $57 million in revenue in 2013 and has been profitable since 2008. In March 2017 the company was acquired by MeetMe.

== Online Brands ==
=== Nod ===
The company released Nod in the app store in July 2015. Nod is a messaging app that features customizable avatars and emoji animations. Apple selected Nod as a best new app.

=== Digsby ===
Digsby is a real-time communications download that connects multiple Instant Messaging services such as AIM, MSN, ICQ and Facebook in one application. It was founded at The Rochester Institute of Technology and was bought in April 2011 as the first acquisition by the company. Digsby was subsequently open sourced by if(we) in 2012.

=== hi5 ===
Once one of the top 3 social networks, the company acquired hi5 in December 2011 and merged it into the features on Tagged while operating it as a separate site and brand.

=== Sidewalk ===
Sidewalk is a stand-alone app for local neighborhood discovery. It is available only in San Francisco.

=== Swoon ===
Swoon is an Android dating app similar to Tinder application where people swipe through photographs and indicate their interest in meeting similar to the site Hot or Not. When two people both express mutual interest a match is made and people are invited to online chat with each other.

=== Tagged ===
Tagged is a social discovery service available on the web and mobile apps designed for meeting new people and dating. It was originally a social network but pivoted to be a site to meet new people in 2007. It also offers social games as part of its features. It became profitable in 2008 and had $43 million in revenue in 2011.

== See also ==
- List of digital distribution platforms for mobile devices
- List of mobile software distribution platforms
- HTML5
- JQuery Mobile
- Mobile application management
- Mobile business intelligence
- Mobile computing
- Mobile Marketing
- Multi-channel app development
