= Greg Tseng =

American Internet entrepreneur (born 1979)

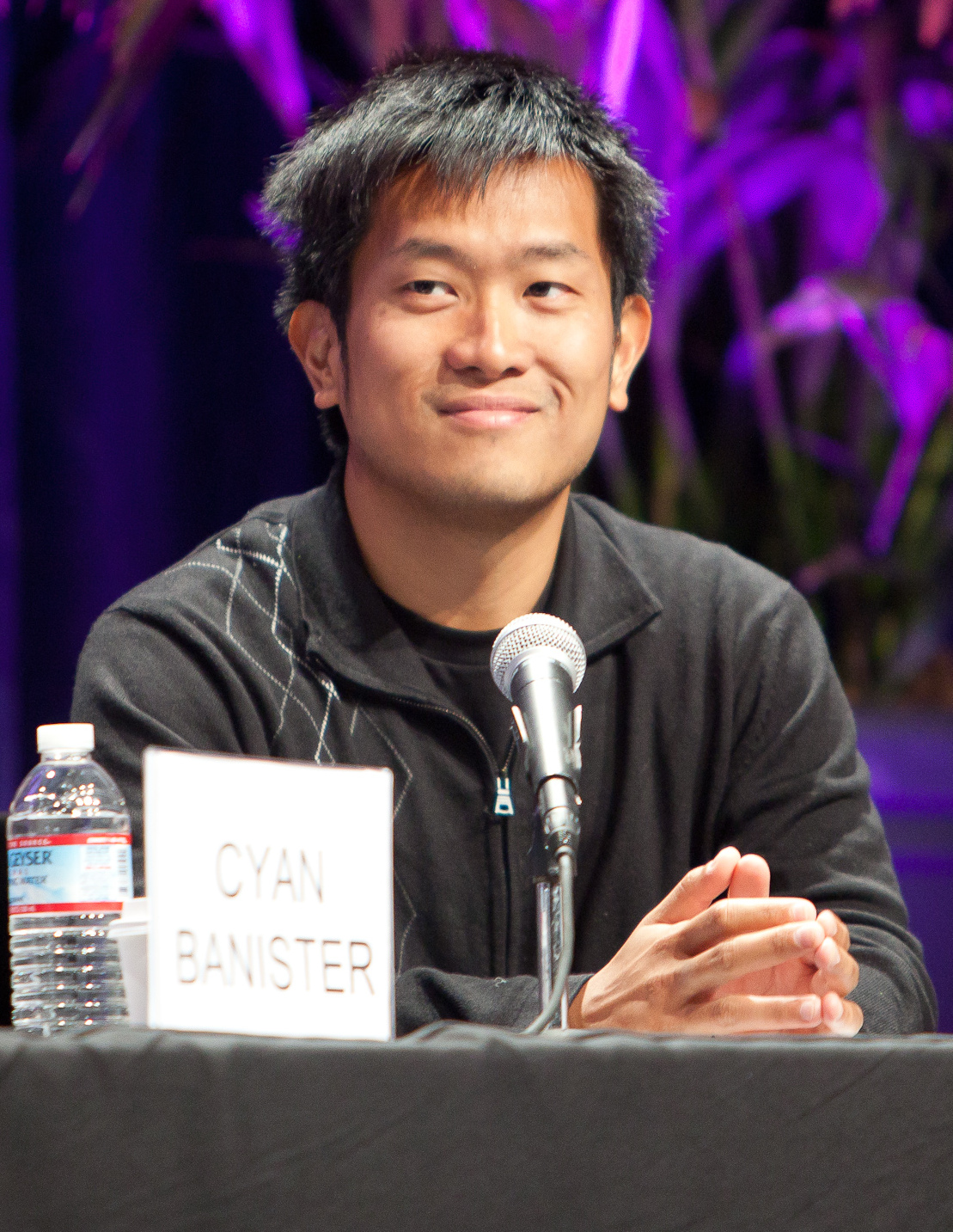
- Tseng in 2011
- Born: Greg Yuchang Tseng; November 14, 1979 (age 46); Taipei, Taiwan
- Education: Harvard University (BA); Stanford University (PhD)
- Occupation: American Internet entrepreneur
- Title: CEO of Tagged; Co-founder of Jumpstart Technologies

Greg Yuchang Tseng (born November 14, 1979) is a Taiwanese-born American Internet entrepreneur. He is co-founder and current CEO of social networking website Tagged and was CEO of JumpStart Technologies, LLC.

== Early life and education ==
Tseng was born in Taipei, Taiwan, and raised in Washington, Virginia. His family was Taiwanese American. Tseng attended Thomas Jefferson High School for Science and Technology and won numerous awards in mathematics and science. He placed 9th in the 1993 national MathCounts competition, tied for 1st place (with a perfect score) in the 1994 American High School Mathematics Exam, and qualified for the United States of America Mathematical Olympiad every year from 1994 to 1997. He was a Finalist in the 1997 Westinghouse Science Talent Search for a project titled "Development of a Fiber Optic Evanescent Wave Ion Sensor With Interchangeable Probes Adaptable for Field Application" and received official commendation from the Fairfax County School Board. For this project, Tseng was also featured in The American Physical Society's A Century of Physics Timeline and inducted into The National Gallery for America's Young Inventors.

From 1997 to 2004, Tseng was an active researcher in nanotechnology at The MITRE Corporation, Harvard University, and Stanford University. At MITRE, he co-authored a Science journal article entitled "Toward Nanocomputers".

In 2001, Tseng earned a Bachelor of Arts in chemistry, physics, and mathematics from Harvard University and co-authored a Science perspective entitled "Carbon Nanotube-Based Nonvolatile Random Access Memory for Molecular Computing" which is the technology behind the company Nantero. At Stanford, he conducted research in the Goldhaber-Gordon group. He then pursued a doctorate in physics under a National Defense Science and Engineering Graduate Fellowship at Stanford University, earning a Ph.D. in 2004.

== Entrepreneur ==
At Harvard, Tseng was director of the Harvard Entrepreneurs Club (HEC) from 1998 to 2000, and co-wrote The Harvard Entrepreneurs Club Guide to Starting Your Own Business (Wiley, 1999). In the fall semester of 1999, Tseng and two classmates launched flyingchickens.com, a price comparison shopping engine for Harvard textbooks. In the spring semester of 2000, flyingchickens.com was merged with Limespot.com and the textbook shopping service was revamped and expanded to over 80 college campuses. In late 2000, Tseng and three other college entrepreneurs were interviewed and featured in The New York Times and Fast Company. While at Harvard, Tseng also co-founded Jumpstart Technologies with longtime friend and business partner Johann Schleier-Smith. Jumpstart was an incubator of Internet businesses including online matchmaker CrushLink and social networking site hi5. In October 2004, Tseng and Johann Schleier-Smith co-founded Tagged, and were both named by BusinessWeek as one of Tech's Best Young Entrepreneurs. They jointly received a U.S. patent for their invention "User created tags for online social networking" which has led to over 200,000 user-created tags on Tagged. As of July 2014, Tseng is CEO of Tagged and advises several other Silicon Valley startup companies.

At first Tagged was a site meant for just teenagers but Tseng realized that he wanted to expand and help the business grow. He expanded his demographic to those who were 13 years old up in all countries. In 2007, he decided to change Tagged's business model and evolve into a social network site that allows you to meet new people and he called it "social discovery"

== Controversies ==
Two of Tseng's companies, Jumpstart and Tagged, have been criticized for their alleged misuse of commercial email and have been the subject of legal action. In 2006, Jumpstart Technologies settled with the Federal Trade Commission on alleged violations of the CAN-SPAM Act which included a $900,000 fine but no admission of guilt. The FTC alleged that "in its FreeFlixTix promotion, Jumpstart violated the law by disguising its commercial e-mails as personal messages, and by misleading consumers as to the terms and conditions of the promotion" and stated "Deceptive subject lines and headers not only violate the CAN-SPAM Act, but also consumer trust." Between April and June 2009, Tagged sent tens of millions of spam emails that falsely stated that a contact sent photographs to the recipient. State Attorney General Andrew Cuomo announced his intention to sue Tagged for "deceptive email marketing and invasion of privacy". Tagged paid or agreed to pay separate settlements of $250,000, $500,000, and $650,000 relating to these practises.

Additionally, in 2002, Salon.com published a negative review of Jumpstart's CrushLink website. CrushLink was alleged to harvest e-mail addresses for later use in spam e-mail in exchange for deceptively offering the name of a "crush" that in the vast majority of cases did not exist.
