= CNN Airport =

Out-of-home television network (1991-2021)

- Country: United States
- Broadcast area: Available in select airports
- Headquarters: Atlanta, Georgia, U.S.

Programming
- Language: English
- Picture format: 480i (SDTV)

Ownership
- Owner: CNN (WarnerMedia News & Sports)
- Sister channels: CNN; CNN-News18; CNN en Español; CNN International; HLN

History
- Launched: June 3, 1991; 35 years ago
- Closed: March 31, 2021; 5 years ago
- Former names: CNN Airport Network (1991–2010)

Links
- Website: edition.cnn.com/CNN/Programs/airport.network/homepage.html

CNN Airport was an American out-of-home television network owned and operated by AT&T's WarnerMedia through CNN, hence its name. The service broadcast general news, weather, stock market updates, entertainment, and travel content to airports across the United States. The founding management was led by Jon Petrovich and Scott Weiss. Deborah Cooper was the inaugural vice president/general manager.

CNN Airport's 24-hour schedule consisted of roughly 16% live news, 19% live sports, 24% lifestyle, 24% travel, and 10% for local inserts from airports if they warrant.

The network discontinued operations on March 31, 2021.

== History ==
CNN Airport logo from 1991 to 2010.

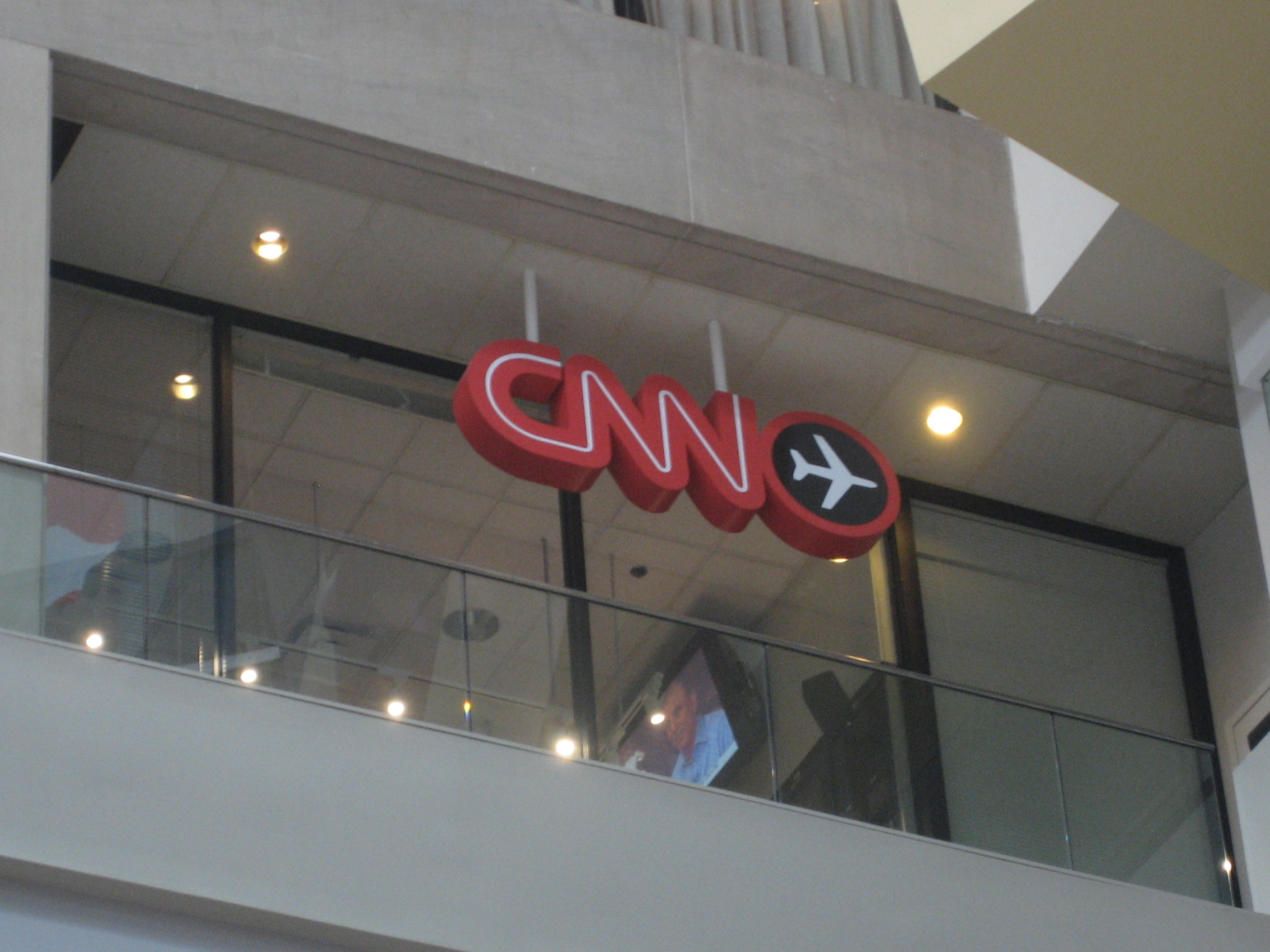
CNN Airport control room at the CNN Center in Atlanta, Georgia.

The network originally was test launched from June 3 to July 14, 1991, at Dallas/Fort Worth International Airport, Hartsfield-Atlanta International Airport and O'Hare International Airport, and officially debuted on January 20, 1992, as the CNN Airport Network.

CNN Airport was available in 58 airports in the United States. CNN would pay local airport authorities for the exclusive rights to run its programming on monitors throughout their terminals.

Its breakfast and early fringe schedule included news programming from CNN and HLN, broadcast on a 10-second delay. The network also aired air travelers-designed weather, business and travel segments. CNN Airport broadcast 24/7, with around-the-clock technical and editorial staffing, including three of its own reporters. Due to the network's prominence in public waiting areas, the network had stricter content standards than the regular CNN; for instance, stories involving commercial aviation incidents and crashes did not appear on the network, and were overlaid with automated weather conditions. Stories that involved sexual content and graphic violence are similarly overlaid. The network's digital on-screen graphics were designed larger than industry standards, to allow readability of fonts at a distance. The network also carried sports coverage from Turner Sports properties, along with other sports rights such as the NFL and the Super Bowl from other networks which were contractually bound to only air on airport screens. Commercial breaks instead carried interstitials from other Turner and Time Warner properties, and the ability to break into programming for airport-wide advisory messages.

In 2018, Republican Iowa congressman Steve King accused CNN Airport of having a monopoly on partisan grounds, proposing an unsuccessful amendment to the FAA Reauthorization Act of 2018 to prohibit a single broadcaster from holding a monopoly over television programming screened at airport terminals. Most American international airports and larger train stations also have shops managed by Paradies Lagardère or other vendors which license the names of other cable networks such as CNBC and Fox News (along with CNN itself) to brand those shops, and likewise screen those channels on the televisions within their premises inexclusive of an airport's advertising and screen deals.

On January 12, 2021, CNN's president Jeff Zucker announced that CNN Airport would cease operations on March 31; Zucker cited several factors and changes in consumer behavior, including the ubiquity of streaming video on mobile devices, as having made the network's purpose outdated.
