= Marcelo Tavares =

Marcelo Tavares may refer to:

- Marcelo Tavares (footballer)
- Marcelo Tavares (entrepreneur), Brazilian videogames collector
