= KCSB-FM =

Radio station by UC Santa Barbara students

- Santa Barbara, California; United States
- Frequency: 91.9 MHz
- Branding: Independent

Programming
- Format: Free-form radio
- Affiliations: Pacifica Radio Network

Ownership
- Owner: Associated Students of UCSB

History
- First air date: 1962
- Call sign meaning: Community Service Broadcasting (derived from UCSB)

Technical information
- Licensing authority: FCC
- Facility ID: 69081
- Class: B
- ERP: 620 watts
- HAAT: 879 metres (2,884 feet)
- Transmitter coordinates: 34°31′31″N 119°57′33″W

Links
- Public license information: Public file; LMS
- Webcast: Listen live
- Website: www.kcsb.org

KCSB-FM (91.9 MHz) is a non-commercial educational radio station located on the UC Santa Barbara campus. KCSB is designed to be educational for both programmers and listeners. UCSB students and other programmers are provided an opportunity to learn the fundamentals of radio broadcasting, both technically and in terms of broadcast content, and to explore more advanced aspects of broadcasting and the audio medium. The station has a range that reaches as far south as Los Angeles County and as far north as San Luis Obispo, California.

== History ==
KCSB was started by student Bill Harrison as Navajo Radio, named for Navajo Hall, a 2nd-floor wing in the Anacapa men's dormitory from which it began broadcasting in 1962, broadcasting 3 – 4 hours of daily programming to the UCSB dorms at 5 watts. It was the first University of California station to be licensed. It gradually grew into the station it is today, changing frequency in 1976 and undergoing wattage expansions in 1964 and 1983.

On April 18, 1970, KCSB was shut down by the Santa Barbara County Sheriff's Office. The department took the measure as a precaution against rioting, which they felt would occur if the UCSB and Isla Vista community became aware of the events of the Isla Vista riots, an outgrowth of anger originating with the Vietnam War that was ignited by the firing of a popular professor. The incident is the only record of a police force shutting down a radio station.

In 1989, the station was embroiled in a controversy revolving around the dismissal of volunteer host Sean Hannity for featuring a guest who made offensive remarks about homosexuals. The Santa Barbara chapter of the American Civil Liberties Union defended Hannity's right to free speech, and the station offered Hannity his slot back. He did not accept the offer, instead demanding more airtime.

KCSB celebrated its 50th anniversary in 2012. The year-long celebration included a design contest, a nostalgic addition to the KCSB program which aired archived shows, an alumni reunion, an audio exhibit, and a radio-themed film series.

== Programming ==
The KCSB schedule of programming is pre-prepared each quarter by the PMRC (Program Mediation and Review Committee). New DJs are required to submit a demo tape, demonstrating an ability to provide alternative programming and a certain amount of skill using the mixing board. Slots are assigned according to programmer availability, quality of programming, and seniority. Before applying to KCSB, interested DJs must complete a quarter of training on KJUC, the AM training station that can only be heard in the dorms, and receive a passing score on the FCC test. Any member of the community may try for a spot on the schedule. Besides offering unique musical programming, KCSB is a conduit of community news and information, including UCSB athletics, and features the popular national news program Democracy Now. The station has been webcasting since the 1990s.

After 31 years employed at UCSB, KCSB Advisor Elizabeth Robinson retired at the end of Spring Quarter 2012. An executive committee made up of UCSB students administer various aspects of the station including promotions, publications, programming and engineering.

== Notable personalities ==
The following notable individuals have been featured by KCSB as on-air personalities:

- Sean Hannity, talk radio host and the host of Fox News Channel's program Hannity. Was on KCSB during the late 1980s.
- Edie Lambert, News anchor @ KCRA-TV in Sacramento, formerly @ KEYT-TV-3 in Santa Barbara. Edie was in the News Department at KCSB in the late 1980s.
- Jeffrey Peterson, famous technology entrepreneur. Was a DJ and Traffic Manager at KCSB from 1986 to 1990.
- Jim Rome, sports radio host syndicated by Clear Channel. Worked at KCSB during the mid-1980s and was Sports Director for one quarter. Was also sports director at KTMS-AM 1250 in Santa Barbara for two years after graduating from UCSB.
- Zan Stewart, award-winning jazz journalist, on air in 1964 and again 1972–1974.

== See also ==
- College radio
- List of college radio stations in the United States
- List of community radio stations in the United States
