= Jon Petrovich =

Journalist and television executive

Jon Petrovich (February 28, 1947 – February 10, 2011) was an American journalist and television executive. He is credited with founding numerous enterprises for CNN, including CNN.com, CNN Airport Network, and CNN en Español.

== Biography ==
Petrovich was born in Gary, Indiana. He earned a bachelor's degree from Indiana University and a bachelor's degree from the University of Alabama.

== Career ==
Petrovich began as a reporter for WHAS-TV in Louisville, Kentucky, before moving on to become assistant News Director for WDIV-TV in Detroit, Michigan. He was news director at WBAL-TV in Baltimore, Maryland, and later vice president and general manager of KTVI-TV in St. Louis, Missouri.

Petrovich was executive vice president for CNN's Headline News (now HLN) in Atlanta, Georgia. Ted Turner hired him to lead Headline News in the mid-1980s. He oversaw CNN Radio and was directly involved in business development and marketing for all CNN networks. In 1994, he funded the establishment of CNN.com, and helped create CNN Airport Network and CNN en Español. He is widely credited with launching CNN Radio Noticias and CNN NewsSource. While executive vice president of CNN Headline News, the network incorporated factoids into its on-air half-hour news wheel format. In addition, In 1993 Headline News was the first cable or TV network in the U.S. to incorporate a news ticker crawl into its telecast.

After his role at CNN, Petrovich became president of Turner Broadcasting System Latin America. Petrovich was the head of international networks for Sony Television after leaving CNN. Thereafter he was Professor and Broadcast Chair at the Medill School of Journalism at Northwestern University. In 2007 he became the head of U.S. broadcast operations for the Associated Press, where he oversaw the day-to-day domestic operations, working directly with AP's broadcast wire, online, radio and television operations.

== Death ==
Petrovich, died February 10, 2011, in New York City from complications due to cancer and diabetes, leaving behind his wife Karen and two grown children.
