= Fernando Espuelas =

American businessman

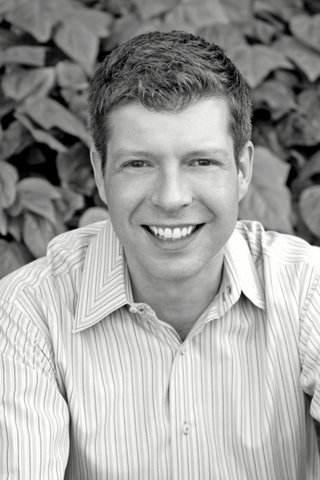
- Political analyst, host and managing editor of "The Fernando Espuelas Show"
- Born: August 6, 1966 (age 60); Montevideo, Uruguay
- Education: Connecticut College
- Spouse: Ann Clark Espuelas
- Awards: New York Magazine New York Award (1999); Hispanic Business Magazine 100 Most Influential Hispanics (1999); Hispanic Business Magazine 100 Most Influential Hispanics (2000); Crain's New York magazine "2000 All-Star Business Leader" (2000); Latin Trade Magazine's Bravo Award, "Internet CEO of the Year" (2000); Hispanic Business Magazine "Hispanic Entrepreneur Award"(2000); The Hollywood Reporter "THR's Latino Power 50" (2007); U.S. Hispanic IT Executive Council "100 Most Influential Hispanics and Rising Stars in Information Technology" (2008 & 2009); Poder Magazine "The Nation's 100 Most Influential Hispanics" (2012)
- Website: fernandoespuelas.com

Fernando Espuelas (born August 6, 1966) is an American entrepreneur, author, and journalist.

Espuelas is one of the pioneers of the consumer Internet. He is the co-founder (along with Jack Chen) and first CEO of Starmedia, the first pan-Latin Internet portal, launched in 1996 and now part of Orange, France Telecom's Internet services company.

By the year 2000, Starmedia was the world's leading Latin portal, serving over 25 million Spanish and Portuguese speakers every month across Latin markets in America and Europe, making it one of the top sites by audience size in the world.

Espuelas is a Henry Crown Fellow at the Aspen Institute.

Espuelas has been part of the "power-list" of such diverse media as The Hollywood Reporter The Industry Standard, Latino Leaders Magazine, Red Herring Magazine, Silicon Alley Reporter, Hispanic Business Magazine, CNN, Upside Magazine, and Hispanic Magazine. Espuelas was also named "Immigrant of the Day" by Immigration Daily in 2008.

Espuelas was the co-founder and Chairman of the StarMedia Foundation which, in partnership with the Inter-American Development Bank and Microsoft, built technology training schools in poor neighborhoods in Brazil, Colombia and Uruguay. Espuelas served on the board of directors of the Educational Broadcasting Corporation, operators of PBS' New York flagship television station Thirteen (WNET) and sister station WLIW, as well as on the Board of Trustees of Connecticut College. In 2009, Espuelas became a spokesman for the Los Angeles Parent's Union, also known as Parent Revolution, a non-profit group that seeks to reform public education across the United States. In 2010, Espuelas was elected to the Board of Directors of Parent Revolution.

In 2008, Espuelas created Radio Espuelas, a daily bilingual talkshow broadcast on the Univision Radio Network.

Espuelas also writes for the Huffington Post, The Hill, and CNN and is a frequent commentator on television, such as CBS News, radio on Univision and NPR, as well in print across the world.

== Biography ==
He was born in Montevideo, Uruguay, Espuelas and his mother escaped political and economic turmoil, arriving in the U.S. in 1976 with just $100.

Espuelas attended Greenwich High School, graduating in 1984. At Greenwich High, Espuelas was the President of the Debate Team, the Connecticut State Champion debater in 1982, and the Chairman of the Political Action Club. Espuelas hosted the local Public-access television cable TV show "The Bottom Line with Fernando Espuelas", interviewing Greenwich personalities.

Espuelas worked a series of jobs while going to junior high and high school: gardener, gas station attendant, Woolworth's clerk, restaurant worker; movie usher; newspaper delivery boy, messenger, Chinese food delivery person, pet shop cleaner, baby sitter, electronics board assembler in an electronic church organ manufacturing company, clerk at a soda fountain; greeting card salesman, and as an intern at Philip Morris' headquarters in New York.

In 1988, Espuelas graduated "with distinction" from Connecticut College with a degree in history. While at Connecticut College, Espuelas was first Managing Editor, then Editor-in-Chief and eventually Publisher of the college's newspaper, The College Voice and its associated publications. Espuelas also served as the President of Branford House, as well as on several college-wide faculty-student-administration committees, including the College's Education Committee. He was later elected to the board of trustees of Connecticut College.

== Career ==
In 1988, Espuelas was hired as an assistant account executive by Wunderman Worldwide, a division of the Young & Rubicam advertising agency. While at Wunderman, Espuelas worked on the American Express, General Foods Gevalia and Weight Watchers accounts. After a year at Wunderman, he became an account executive at Interpublic Group of Companies's Lowe & Partners to work on the agency's Citibank Visa account. In 1991, Espuelas returned to South America to work at Ogilvy & Mather's Argentine operations. In Argentina, Espuelas was the founding Managing Director of Ogilvy & Mather Direct. Starting with one account, Espuelas led the company to be O&M Argentina's single largest source of profit by the second year of operations. After two months in Argentina, Espuelas was additionally named head of the company's Unilever account, responsible for a portfolio of global brands such as Dove and Pond's. The Unilever business was one of the most important accounts for O&M in Argentina and across its worldwide network. At the end of 1991, Espuelas was elected to the Board of Directors of Ogilvy & Mather Argentina, at the age of 25.

In 1994 AT&T recruited Espuelas to lead the roll-out of the AT&T brand throughout Latin America. Within a year, he was promoted to Managing Director of Marketing Communications for the Latin American and Caribbean region, becoming one of the youngest executives of that rank at the company. While at AT&T, Espuelas conceived and launched AT&T Hola (in Spanish) and AT&T Ola (in Portuguese), the company's first online service. A combination of news feeds from Reuters, interactive forums, online games and the first search engine that searched in Spanish and Portuguese, AT&T Hola/Ola was positively received by both the media and consumers across Latin America.

In 1996, Espuelas envisioned the portal that would "unite" Latin America: Starmedia. "With the Internet, we're talking about a fundamental shift in the power structure from the institution to the individual," Espuelas said.

After a frustrating year and a half of approaching venture capitalists to invest in his vision, only to have them uniformly refuse, many avowing that Latins "did not like technology" and would never use the Internet, the company went on to raise $2.5 million in 1997.

"They have managed to come up with a pretty big capital raising at the intersection of two of the most volatile investment themes in America: the Internet and Latin America", said Lanny Baker, an analyst of on-line media industry for Salomon Smith Barney in San Francisco."

In 1999, the company went public on the Nasdaq, the first Latin Internet company ever to do so, eventually reaching a market valuation of over $3.8 billion USD at its peak. Starmedia had over 1,200 employees in 18 offices across 12 countries in the Americas and Europe. Today, Starmedia is France Telecom's single largest Internet operation in the world, according to company statements.

Espuelas later launched Voy, a multi-platform media company focused on young Latino consumers. "Among younger, second-generation Hispanics, English is the preferred language, even as they celebrate their Latin backgrounds", reported The New York Sun. "What we wanted to do by launching Voy Music was really take advantage of two dynamics", said Voy Chairman Fernando Espuelas. "The majority of Latinos in this country are bilingual or English dominant, and there are millions of non-Latinos who love Latino music", Espuelas told the Associated Press in 2005.

Espuelas told The New York Sun in 2006. According to The Sun Sentinel, "Voy Music executives say they're tapping a strong market. A study this year by AOL/Roper that found that 55 percent of U.S. Hispanics like to listen to music when online, compared with 41 percent for the general U.S. population. And 37 percent of Latinos had downloaded music, vs. 25 percent for the U.S. population." Voy was named winner of the best "Start-Up Company" award at the Multicultural Media Expo in 2006. In 2007, Forrester Research's study "Hispanic Social Computing Takes-off" ranked Voy's sites as the leading Latin social network pure-play brand in the United States.

Voy also released the award-winning documentary, Favela Rising through its Voy Pictures unit. The film received widespread critical acclaim. Espuelas said at the time of the release, "Favela Rising encapsulates the Voy philosophy of optimism and self-empowerment. The film's message of hope transforms people, motivates and inspires us to action." Telling the true story of one man's struggle against violence and racism to start a social movement for peace, Favela Rising won more than 35 major international awards and was short listed for an Academy Award nomination. It premiered at the Tribeca Film Festival in 2005 and was seen around the world through the film festival circuit. In 2006 it opened in theaters across the U.S. and Brazil and later made its U.S. television debut on HBO/Cinemax.

Squeezed by the 2008 capital markets crisis and unable to raise additional venture funding, Voy restructured its operations, including lay-offs of staff in the U.S. and Latin America, and put itself up for sale. VOY however did not close transactions with competing buyers and ceased operations. The Deal magazine reported, "Espuelas couldn't have picked a more challenging era in which to launch a media company. The Internet has transformed everything from distribution to consumer behavior. Ironically, Espuelas erred in underestimating the one medium he should have understood best, the Internet. It took a middle-of-the-night epiphany to remind him of what he should have known all along: It's the Internet, stupid.

In 2007, Espuelas was named a Henry Crown Fellow.

Espuelas created in 2008 The Fernando Espuelas Show, a drive-time, daily radio talkshow on Univision Radio Los Angeles, the nation's second largest radio market and biggest market for Latino radio. Espuelas hosts and is managing editor of the radio program which is distributed nationally by the Univision Radio Network. Espuelas is also a political analyst and social commentator on television, Internet and in print.

Espuelas was CEO of American Latinos United, a political SuperPac created to drive Latino voting during the 2020 elections. He co-founded American Latinos United with former LA Mayor Antonio Villaraigosa. He was named in 2017 Co-Chairman of Mercury Public Affairs in Washington DC.

=== The Fernando Espuelas Show ===
Fernando Espuelas created, hosts and is the managing editor of his eponymously named radio talk show on Univision America Network. Launched in Los Angeles in July 2008, with Univision Radio, The Fernando Espuelas Show is now broadcast nationally on the Univision America Network, streams on the Internet and mobile devices through Univision Radio apps.

Centered on politics and controversial social issues, Espuelas has interviewed on The Fernando Espuelas Show diverse political leaders, including: President Barack Obama, Nancy Pelosi, Chairman of the Republican National Committee Reince Priebus, Chair of the Democratic National Committee Debbie Wasserman Schultz, Obama for America Chief Campaign Spokesman Ben LaBolt, U.S. Senator & Majority Leader Harry Reid, U.S. Secretary of the Interior Ken Salazar, U.S. Senator Michael Bennet, former Florida Governor Jeb Bush, Former Obama White House Press Secretary Robert Gibbs, U.S. Trade Representative Ambassador Ron Kirk, Director of the Earth Institute at Columbia University Dr. Jeffrey Sachs, Democratic National Committee Executive Director Patrick Gaspard, Chairman of the American Conservative Union Al Cardenas, Special Assistant to the President & White House Deputy Director of the National Economic Council Brian Deese, Governor Buddy Roemer, Congressman Luis Gutierrez, California Governor Arnold Schwarzenegger, Obama "Car Czar" Steve Rattner, Bishop William Henry Willimon of the Methodist Church of Alabama, U.S. Secretary of Labor Hilda Solis, Congressman Mario Díaz-Balart, U.S. Secretary of Education Arne Duncan, former Speaker of the United States House of Representatives Newt Gingrich, California Governor Jerry Brown, former New Mexico Governor and Libertarian Party 2012 Presidential candidate Gary Johnson, candidate Meg Whitman, Congressman Francisco Canseco, Congressman Xavier Becerra, Congresswoman Maxine Waters, Congressman Mario Díaz-Balart, Congresswoman Jan Schakowsky, Congresswoman Loretta Sanchez, Congressman David Rivera, Congressman George Miller, Congresswoman Judy Chu, Lt. Governor of California and former Mayor of San Francisco Gavin Newsom, Mayor of Los Angeles Antonio Villaraigosa, Mayor of Palm Springs Steve Pougnet, Mayor of Costa Mesa Allan Mansoor, Republican National Committee Director of Hispanic Outreach Bettina Inclán, Obama for America Director of Hispanic Press Gabriela Domenzain, U.S. Department of Labor Chief Economist Adriana Kugler, California Lt. Governor & State Senator Abel Maldonado, Leader of the California State Assembly Majority, Assemblyman Alberto Torrico, Leader of the Hispanic Caucus in the California Assembly Senator Gil Cedillo, and Rosario Marin former Treasurer of the United States, among other national political figures.

He emerged as a vocal defender of President Obama on immigration, often countering criticisms from within the Latino community. When a prominent Latino leader labeled Obama the "deporter-in-chief," Espuelas quickly fired back, accusing activists like NCLR’s Janet Murguia of "urging Obama to break the law."

Over time, Espuelas’ stance appeared to shift. As the Obama administration hinted at possible executive actions, he voiced support for such measures, urging Obama to "be ready to act." When Obama ultimately postponed these actions, Espuelas commented that "President Obama should wait on immigration executive action," and later, praised Obama as "ascendant" when the policies were announced.

Poder Magazine named Espuelas one of "The Nation's 100 Most Influential Hispanics" in 2012 for the show's empowering of "...Latinos to be part of the American political system.

Also in 2012, The Fernando Espuelas Show was re-launched as part of the new talk-radio Univision America Network.

=== StarMedia ===
In a highly publicized moment of inspiration that was recounted in numerous articles and television segments, Espuelas envisioned a "virtual plaza to connect the peoples of Latin America" while hiking atop a mountain in Nepal. Soon after, Espuelas founded Starmedia with his Chinese-American childhood friend, Jack Chen.

As Starmedia's Chairman and CEO, collaborating with co-founder and Starmedia President Jack Chen, Espuelas created the first Internet media company for Spanish- and Portuguese-speaking audiences worldwide. Using a combination of their 12 credit cards, family savings, and loans from friends, the pair managed to piece together the first $100,000 used to launch the Latin portal in September 1996.

"Shares of StarMedia Networks, the most highly anticipated of last week's offerings, closed 74 percent above its initial offering price of $15 per share on Wednesday, its first day of trading," reported The New York Times at the time of StarMedia's IPO. Gail Bronson, an analyst at IPO Monitor, said on CNN, "StarMedia is the behemoth south of the border."

Starmedia's success served as an important catalyst in the development of the Latin Internet market by encouraging both entrepreneurs and financiers to back the development of the sector. According to Computerworld, "StarMedia's success is credited with igniting the vibrant enthusiasm that the Latin America Internet market currently enjoys, and which has led a number of companies to follow in StarMedia's footsteps, including big guns like Spain's Telefonica SA, America Online Inc. (AOL), Yahoo, Lycos, Brazil's UOL Inc. and Microsoft Corp., as well as cocky startups like Patagon.com International Ltd., Zona Financiera Inc. and Yupi Internet Inc." As of 2011, there were an estimated 212+ million Internet users in Latin America.

According to Institutional Investor, "the $110 million IPO in May [1999] for StarMedia Networks, the Internet company [Espuelas] founded three years earlier, marked a watershed in the history of Latin America's financial markets. For the first time, a pan-regional company built from scratch and headquartered in New York has sold shares on the Nasdaq Stock Market to mainly United States investors to finance its expansion in Latin America." "Today, New York City-based StarMedia is widely seen as a market pioneer and, so far, as the player to beat in the Latin America portal market. The company has about 700 employees, operations in 9 countries and partnerships with companies such as AT&T, Visa International Inc. and Hewlett-Packard Co," added Computerworld. Speaking to The New York Times, New York Mayor Rudolph W. Giuliani said "I applaud the company for contributing to the continued growth of the city's high-tech community."

At the time of the IPO, Espuelas told CNET: "I think we present a unique story, where maybe the other companies were versions of companies that already existed. We also have market leadership, we have a big brand, we're the first mover into a really big market with a lot of growth potential, and I think the market recognized that and sort of differentiated us from just another Internet IPO."

"The strategy is simple: Build on being the first Internet service to cater to Latin American PC owners on a regional basis rather than country by country, and try to keep a step ahead of the inevitable competition. So far, the positioning has allowed StarMedia to make deals with Fox Latin America for sports and children's programming, with Dow Jones for financial news, and with Viacom Spelling Entertainment Group for TV show Melrose Place and other nighttime soap operas", explained Business Week in the article "Welcoming Spanish Speakers to the Web: Fast-growing StarMedia is Racing to Fill the Niche First"

Espuelas added: "We are literally creating an industry, we have built, but will continue to construct, the biggest brand in Latin America."

In the 1999 story in The New York Times, "C.E.O. Round Table- Online Pioneers: The Buzz Never Stops", Espuelas explained his approach: "I spent a lot of time learning how Winston Churchill ran the Second World War. I bring that up as a metaphor—not having information, not having clarity, the stakes being very high. Of course, the stakes he had to deal with were somewhat higher than what we have to do. But that was part of the encouragement—to think that something so important could be managed, and all the mistakes that were made and the chaos of the moment. And the other thing, which he said, which I love as a philosophy, is: You don't have to get it right all the time. You just have to get it right 51 percent of the time, and that will carry you through. And that's a very, very liberating philosophy."

According to a Harvard Business School case, written by professors Thomas Eisenmann and John K. Rust, "by the fall of 1999, StarMedia had sprinted to a sizable lead in the race to acquire Latin American Internet users. Its pan-regional, horizontal portal was the first to target Spanish- and Portuguese-language speakers on the Internet, registering 1.2 billion page views in the third quarter of 1999. Thirty-three-year-old StarMedia co-founder Fernando Espuelas was the toast of "Silicon Alley" and a recognized hero throughout Latin America. A picture of him on the cover of Internet World magazine--ripping his shirt open to show the StarMedia logo, like Superman, summed up the spirit of the company."

Espuelas created a communications culture to connect StarMedia's 18 offices in 12 countries. "[Espuelas]... will set a goal at one meeting, and by the time the next one rolls around, we've made tremendous progress.... Each meeting has a clear goal—to deliver quarterly results, to announce a major initiative or partnership, to clarify our strategic vision. Whenever possible, Fernando and other executives make their comments trilingually. That sometimes generates good-natured teasing about accents, but our employees really appreciate the effort. To make certain that nothing is lost in the translations, someone from each office recaps the entire announcement in that country's native tongue. Then we follow up with an online chat, during which the management team fields questions from employees", said Gally Bar-on, chief of staff, StarMedia Network Inc. and president, StarMedia Foundation.

"Our overriding goal is to communicate clearly across language barriers and geographic boundaries. By connecting with all of our offices -- and by addressing everyone in three languages -- we're able to unite our employees around one company vision...The one thing that we hear consistently from our employees is, 'We want more Fernando.' They want to know what he's thinking. This meeting allows him to communicate his vision", added Bar-on.

In a Computerworld interview Espuelas said, "What we have to do is remain absolutely focused on giving our users the best possible experience, and giving our partners and advertisers a mutually profitable relationship. We're really looking forward, not backwards. All of this competition has stimulated the market in a very dramatic fashion, in terms of marketing, in terms of growing the market, in terms of the attention of advertisers, partners and Wall Street. So we see it very positively. We just need to make sure we're never satisfied with ourselves, and we're not. We can always be better and faster and more efficient."

In the Business Week cover story "La Vida Loca of a Latin Web Star" Espuelas is described as: "If ever there were a poster boy for the bilingual, bicultural executive of the Internet age, it's Fernando J. Espuelas, the 33-year-old chairman and chief executive of New York-based StarMedia Networks Inc. The Spanish- and Portuguese-language portal offers everything from chat rooms to shopping. Born in Uruguay, Espuelas moved to the U.S. at age 10. He has worked much of his adult life in Latin America, but when wooing investors, he's all Wall Street."

The company's high profile, as manifested in its thousands of press articles across the world, ensured that the whole Latin Internet sector benefited from a constant source of positive attention and relevance. Billions of dollars were subsequently invested in Latin America by foreign and local companies, international venture capitalists and buy-out firms seeking to capitalize in the fast growth of this new segment.

Myriad companies were created and funded, telecommunications companies made significant investments in infrastructure to meet the demand, and governments and other key sectors of the society, specifically the news media, adopted Web tools to modernize. Espuelas sought to "...redefine history – and I think that, in fact, is what happened...The StarMedia idea of Pan Latin Americanism, an idea with deep historical roots, was a profound turning point for Latinos across the world."

Espuelas, a skilled marketer armed with cash from his successful IPO, was the mastermind of massive marketing campaigns promoting the StarMedia brand.

"We want to be the Coca-Cola of the Internet in Latin America," Espuelas said.

In the process, Espuelas became iconic as the "poster boy" of the Latin Internet, appearing on the cover of magazines, in television shows and even in CNN's own promotions: a brief image of Espuelas was included, amongst other renowned politicians and celebrities, within the 15 second top-of-hour CNN on-air network ID.

On May 25, 1999, StarMedia completed the first public offering on Nasdaq for a Latin Internet company, selling 7 million shares at $15. The company went on to raise hundreds of millions more capital over the next two years. By 2000, at age 34, Espuelas was acknowledged as one of the main players in Silicon Alley and the Latino Internet industry. Uruguay's leading newspaper, El País, dubbed him "The Emperor of the Internet" on its front page.

CNN filmed a documentary on Espuelas’ life that was broadcast across the world. The media referred to Espuelas as "The Hispanic Bill Gates" and the "Simón Bolívar of the Internet", terms that would be often recapitulated in thousands of articles and interviews referencing Starmedia.

In February 2000, Starmedia created Latin America's first free, ad-supported regional internet service provider with a $200 million investment from CMGI Inc., Flatiron Partners, Chase Capital Partners and 1stUp.com.

On August 5, 2001, after a disagreement with the Board regarding the strategic direction of the company, Espuelas resigned as CEO of StarMedia but agreed to stay on as Chairman until November 15, 2001 to effect an orderly management transition. At that time, he was replaced by Susan Segal as head of the company; Segal was a venture capitalist, representing Chase Manhattan Bank's Chase Capital Partners, which had given Starmedia its first round of institutional financing in 1997. Segal then led the company's new strategy to divest itself of its market leading portal assets, including the StarMedia brand and network of websites, and focus the company on its mobile unit, StarMedia Mobile. The resulting new company, Cyclelogic, was led by Segal until it filed for bankruptcy in 2003.

As part of Segal's new strategy, in July 2002, StarMedia was sold for $8 million to EresMas, a Spanish ISP. EresMas was then sold to a unit of France Telecom, Internet subsidiary Wanadoo, 10 days later for $255 million euros. EresMas' new leadership of the Latin Internet (through the purchase of StarMedia the previous week) was cited by France Telecom as the reason for the acquisition.

Espuelas writes in Life in Action: "Because I believed in our company and our mission, I had never sold a single StarMedia share or stock option. I personally lost close to $500 million."

In 2006, the U.S. Securities and Exchange Commission sued Espuelas and the rest of StarMedia's senior executive team alleging in a civil lawsuit that the accounting treatment of a certain transaction relating to StarMedia's Mexican subsidiaries did not meet GAAP accounting standards. The civil lawsuit relates to accounting decisions made by StarMedia and its outside accounting firm Ernst & Young, and approved by the Starmedia Board of Directors' Audit Committee in 1999 and 2000. In 2011, Espuelas settled the suit "without admitting or denying the allegations in the amended complaint".

At the time of the filing, Espuelas, who cooperated with the SEC investigation over five years, told Adweek magazine: "I know that I did nothing wrong....It [the lawsuit] is related to accounting issues at the company. I personally was not involved in accounting at the company. I'm very confident that the company did things right. We had a rather elaborate control function, both internal and external, and to my knowledge that was undertaken correctly."

In company announcements made in 2006, StarMedia, now part of France Telecom's Orange subsidiary, the company claimed to be the global leader in Spanish language Internet services. In 2006, the company stated, Starmedia was serving over 22 million unique users a month and continued to expand by launching new services, such as finance and entertainment channels, and opening offices across Latin America.

In the Hispanic Business article "The Kings of Comebacks", Espuelas said, "...we [at StarMedia] wanted to redefine history - and I think that... is what happened", Mr. Espuelas writes in his 2004 book Life in Action. "The StarMedia idea of Pan Latin Americanism, an idea with deep historical roots, was a profound turning point for Latinos across the world." But in the spring of 2000, StarMedia suffered what the book calls "the near-complete collapse of the Internet economy." By his own calculation, Mr. Espuelas' StarMedia holdings at one point had a value of nearly $500 million, but he never sold a single share. "I lived a full cycle", he tells Hispanic Business. "It was the best business and personal experience I could have had at this point in my life. "

"What Fernando has been credited with is a vision that may be ahead of his time", says Adele Morrissette, a former angel investor in Starmedia and now a managing director at investment bank BMO Capital Markets Corp. of Toronto. "People who invested with Fernando early did well if they sold their stock when it went public. It was a good investment for me", reported The Deal.

== Awards ==
In 2012, Espuelas was named one of "The Nation's 100 Most Influential Hispanics" by Poder Magazine. Time included Espuelas on their list of the "Leaders of the Millennium", and he was recognized as a "2000 All-Star" business leader by Crain's New York Business magazine. He was also a recipient of Latin Trade Magazine 's Bravo Award, being named "Internet CEO of the Year". He received a New York Award in 1999. Hispanic Business magazine gave Espuelas its Hispanic Entrepreneur Award in 2000. He was also named a "Latin American Leader of the Internet" by CNN en Español

Latinvision.com selected Espuelas as one of the "Top 50 Who Matter Most!" list of Latino media executives in 2008. The U.S. Hispanic IT Executive Council named Espuelas in 2009 and 2010 to its HITEC 100, the list of "Most Influential Hispanics and Rising Stars in Information Technology".
