= The Meet Group =

Social media conglamerate

The Meet Group, Inc.
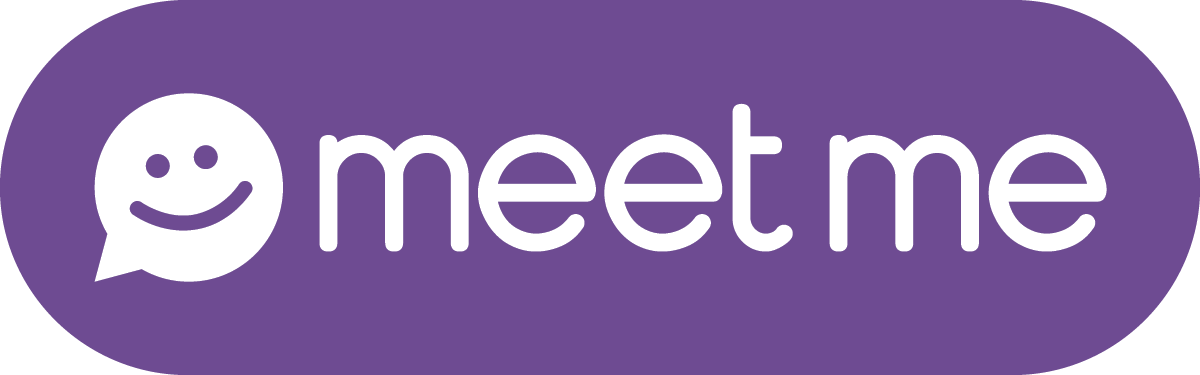
- Company type: Public
- Website type: Social networking service
- Available in: English, Portuguese, Spanish, French, Italian, German, Chinese, Russian, Japanese, Korean, Dutch, Turkish, Malay, Indonesian.
- Traded as: Nasdaq: MEET (2014–2020)
- Founded: April 2005; 21 years ago (as MyYearbook)
- Headquarters: New Hope, Pennsylvania, U.S.
- Owner: ProSiebenSat.1 Media
- Founders: Geoff Cook; David Cook; Catherine Cook
- Parent: ParshipMeet Group
- Website: www.themeetgroup.com
- Advertising: Banner ads, custom ads
- Registration: Required
- Current status: Active
- Written in: PHP

The Meet Group, Inc. (formerly MeetMe) owns several dating app networking services including MeetMe, hi5, LOVOO, Growlr, Skout, and Tagged. The company has offices in New Hope, Pennsylvania, Philadelphia, San Francisco, Dresden, and Berlin.

== History ==
The myYearbook logo, which was used from 2005 to 2012

Two siblings, Dave and Catherine Cook, created myYearbook during their Spring break of 2005. They persuaded their older brother Geoff, who had founded EssayEdge and ResumeEdge from his Harvard dorm room, to invest in their project. At the launch of the site, Dave was a junior in high school and Catherine was a sophomore; the project was initially activated at Montgomery High School, in suburban New Jersey where they attended. The site was created entirely by workers in India.

In 2006, myYearbook raised $4.1 million from U.S. Venture Partners and First Round Capital. In 2008, it raised $13 million in a Series B round.

In July 2011, myYearbook announced it had agreed to be acquired by Latino social networking site Quepasa. In June 2012, the company formed from the combination of myYearbook and Quepasa was renamed MeetMe.

In October 2016, MeetMe acquired Skout for $55 million.

On April 3, 2017, the company acquired if(we) and rebranded to The Meet Group.

In September 2017, Meet Group acquired German dating app Lovoo for US$70 million.

In 2020, The Meet Group was acquired by ProSiebenSat.1 Media with a parent company, ParshipMeet Group, being formed to manage both The Meet Group and Parship.

In 2022, Tumblr announced its livestreaming service Tumblr Live, based on The Meet Group's product Livebox. In 2024, Tumblr announced that they would be discontinuing Tumblr Live as of January 24, with options for users to migrate to MeetMe.

== See also ==
- Facebook
- Myspace
- List of social networking services
