= Fini (company) =

Spanish candy company

The Fini Company
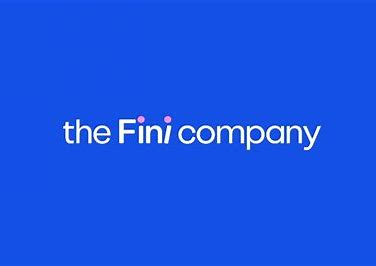
- Logo of The Fini Company used in Europe
- Trade name: Fini
- Company type: Private
- Founded: 1971; 55 years ago in Murcia, Spain
- Founder: Manuel Sánchez Cano
- Headquarters: Murcia, Spain
- Area served: Worldwide
- Products: Gummy candies, marshmallows, popsicles, tubes, jelly candies and other candies.
- Brands: Fini
- Owner: Grupo Sánchez Cano
- Website: www.finicompany.com www.finistore.com.br

Fini is a Spanish confectionery company founded in 1971 by Manuel Sánchez Cano in Murcia, Spain. It is one of the largest confectionery companies in the world.

Its biggest market is Brazil where the company's products are present in more than 85,000 Brazilian points of sale and operates a production facility, making Fini the confectionary market leader in Brazil.

== History ==
In 1953, Manuel Sánchez Cano founded a small chewing gum factory. 1971, Manuel started to manufacture sweets. In 1980, the company began to expand, opening distribution centers in Portugal and Spain.

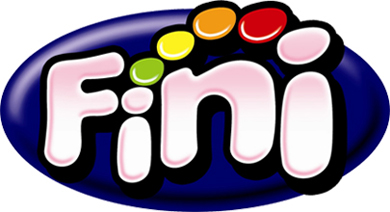
Fini logo used in 2001

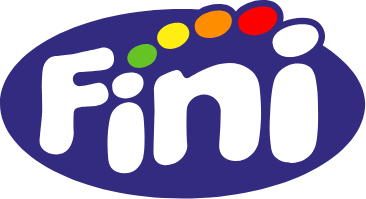
Fini logo used in 2020

In 1998, the company arrived in Brazil. In 2001, the company's factory in Jundiaí was inaugurated. The factory in Jundiaí is the only outside Europe.

In 2018, Fini launched its brand of candies aimed at well-being and health.

In 2019, Fini launched an ice cream line in Brazil, in partnership with the company Froneri.

In 2023, the company launched a line of lip moisturizers in partnership with the company Cimed.

== Recognition ==
In 2024, Fini Golosinas received the Pioneer Award at the Kantar Outstanding Innovation Awards. The recognition highlighted the company's creativity and its innovative approach to expanding into new markets beyond its traditional confectionery business.

== See also ==
- Candy
- Candy Shop
