= Scott Weiss =

American businessman

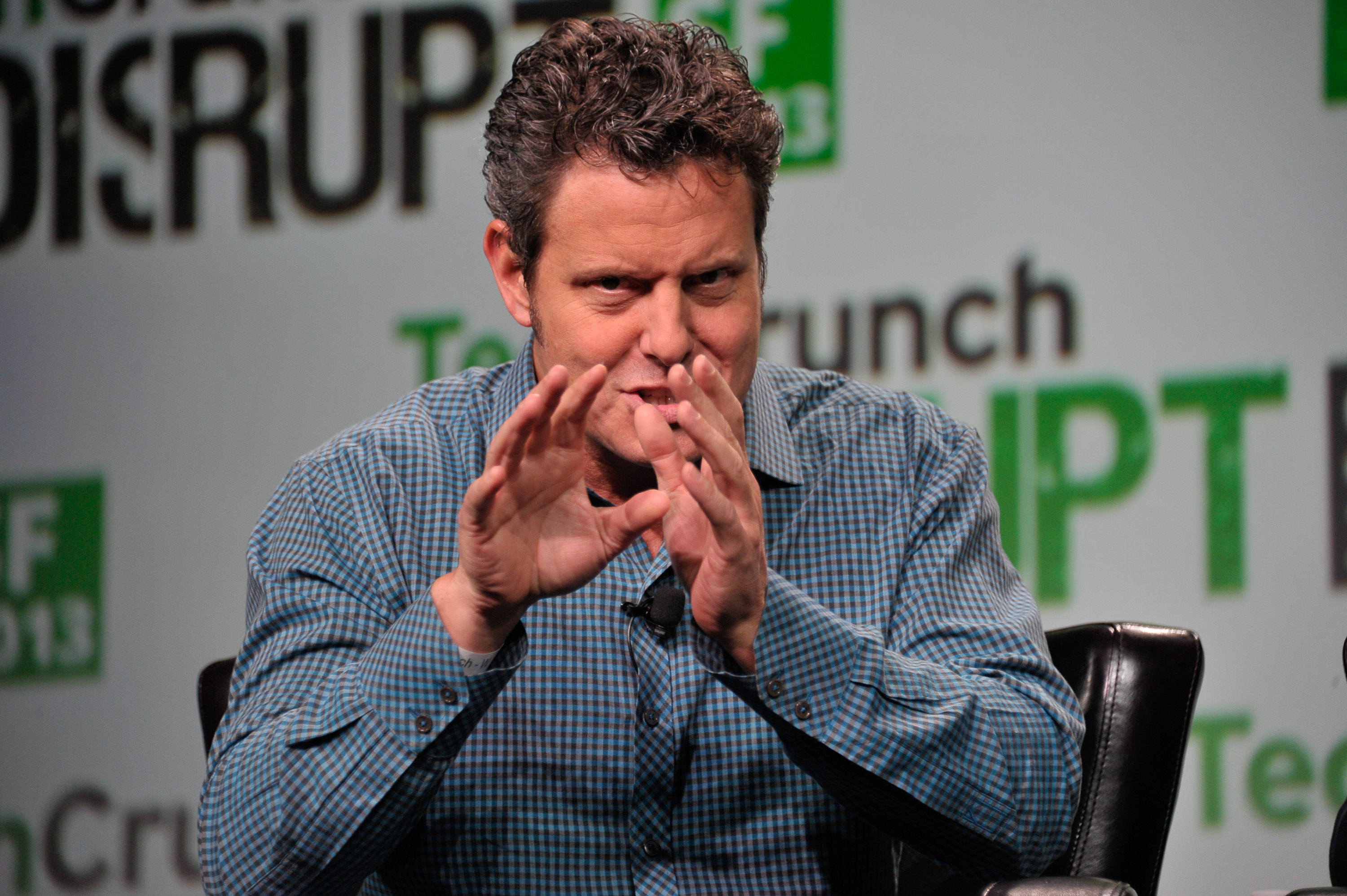
- Weiss in 2013
- Education: University of Florida (B.A.); Harvard University (M.B.A.)
- Occupation: Venture capitalist
- Known for: General Partner at Andreessen Horowitz

Scott Weiss is an American venture capitalist at the Silicon Valley firm Andreessen Horowitz, joining in April 2011 as the firm's fourth general partner. A native of Sarasota, Florida, he founded and was CEO of IronPort Systems, which Cisco acquired in 2007 for $830 million.

== Education ==
Weiss received a Bachelor of Arts from the University of Florida and an M.B.A. from Harvard Business School.

== Early career ==
Weiss was an associate at McKinsey & Company and spent his first five years out of college at Electronic Data Systems. He then headed MSN business development at Microsoft and was employee no. 13 at Hotmail, an email provider that Microsoft acquired in 1998. At Hotmail, Weiss was responsible for partnership and revenue generating business development efforts.

Prior to 2001, Weiss was the managing director and entrepreneur in residence at Idealab, a business incubator.

Weiss was vice president and general manager of Cisco's Security Technology Group, a position he assumed following Cisco's acquisition of email appliance provider IronPort Systems. Weiss co-founded IronPort Systems in 2001 with Scott Banister, with whom he had worked at Idealab. Over the next six years, IronPort Systems grew from two people into a company with 450 employees and a $200 million run rate.

== Andreessen Horowitz ==
He serves on the boards of Distelli, Platfora, Silver Tail Systems, Bluebox, and Jumio as well as Skout, App.Net, and Return Path.

Weiss is credited with bringing to the firm 360-degree feedback performance reviews of partners by other partners, venture firms and entrepreneurs of the companies in Andreessen Horowitz's portfolio. This type of performance review is an unusual practice for venture capital firms.

Scott Weiss joined the Board of Directors of Optimizely as part of Andreesen Horowitz's Series B round in the company.

Weiss was previously on the Board of Directors of Skout, the social mobile company that was sold in 2016 to The Meet Group.
