= Marcelo Tavares (entrepreneur) =

Videogames specialist

- Born: 1979 (age 46–47); Niterói, Rio de Janeiro, Brazil
- Occupations: Journalist and entrepreneur
- Known for: Organizer of largest Brazilian video gaming convention, the Brasil Game Show

Marcelo Tavares is a Brazilian journalist and entrepreneur who is a video game specialist and one of the biggest videogames collector in Brazil. He is the organizer of Brasil Game Show (BGS), the largest gaming convention in Latin America. He was interviewed by many popular TV shows in Brazil including Danilo Gentili (SBT) and Jô Soares (TV Globo).

Tavares has collected more than 350 video game consoles, around 3,500 games, and hundreds of accessories. Among the devices are the classic videogames concoles Atari 2600, Teleplay, Odyssey, Master System, NES, Famicom, SNES, Mega Drive, and Game Boy. There are also some rare ones including Virtual Boy, Pippin, Microvision, Channel F, Game & Watch, 3DO, Vectrex and Amiga CD 32.

== Early years ==
Tavares was born in Niterói, Rio de Janeiro. He first encountered video games in 1986, when he played an Atari console for the first time. A decade later, in 1996, he began what would become one of Brazil's largest private video game collections.

== Career ==
In 2002, he organized a small event called Game Churrasco, a gathering of friends where video games were the central theme.

In 2003, Tavares expanded his involvement in gaming culture by producing and hosting the television program Game News on Channel 36. His passion for games and journalism continued into 2005, when he wrote for the newspaper Jornal da Cidade and created a video game column for the JB Online.

In 2008, Tavares exhibited part of his collection at the Museu Nacional de Belas Artes (National Museum of Fine Arts) in Rio de Janeiro and served as editor of the GameNews Magazine. That same year, he also contributed articles to the Fluminense newspaper.

The year 2009 marked a turning point in his career: he organized the first Rio Game Show in Niterói, which laid the groundwork for what would become the Brasil Game Show. During that period, he also worked as a columnist for the TI Digital Magazine and contributed to the Topblog Awards’ video game column.

In 2010, the Rio Game Show evolved into the Brasil Game Show (BGS), with its inaugural edition held at the SulAmérica Convention Center in Rio de Janeiro. That same year, Tavares also wrote for O Globo's youth magazine Megazine.

The following year, saw the rapid growth of BGS, which attracted around 60,000 visitors and 92 exhibitors, establishing itself as the largest video game event in Latin America.

By 2012, the event had moved to Expo Center Norte in São Paulo, drawing over 100,000 attendees. Attendance rose to 150,000 in 2013, when the fair occupied two full pavilions.

The show continued expanding in 2014, welcoming more than 250,000 visitors over five days and occupying all five pavilions of the Expo Center Norte. During that edition, BGS collected over 70 tons of food for the charity Casa de David. The shows continued and by 2024, it celebrated 15 years with over 2.8 million visitors in total.
