= Skout =

Social networking website

- Type: Private
- Industry: Software development
- Founded: (2007)
- Founder: Christian Wiklund; Niklas Lindstrom
- Headquarters: San Francisco, United States
- Key people: Christian Wiklund, (CEO); Niklas Lindstrom, (CTO)
- Products: SKOUT; Fuse; Nixter
- Website: skout.com

SKOUT is the developer of a location-based social networking and dating application and website. SKOUT was one of the first dating and mobile people discovery applications to emphasize generalized user location. SKOUT is available on both iOS and Android operating systems. Other SKOUT properties include Nixter, a nightlife app, and Fuse, an ephemeral group messaging app. SKOUT reported that over 500 million connections were made using its app in 2013.

SKOUT uses a cellphone's global positioning system to help users to find other users within a general radius of one another. SKOUT does not identify a user's precise location, and users can choose to opt out of the location-tracking features of the app. GPS location is only enabled in the adult community. While searching for people, users can view the profile and recent activities of others that they find interesting. The application also allows users to instant message or send virtual gifts to one another. The company segregates its adult and teen communities. SKOUT is available in 189 countries and 16 languages.

== History ==
The service was founded as a mobile web social network in 2007 by Christian Wiklund and Niklas Lindstrom. The two, Skout's chief executive officer and chief technology officer respectively, relaunched the network in 2009 as a dating and people discovery application and website after recognizing over 80% of the site's users were using it as a dating platform. SKOUT launched its iOS application in February 2009 at the 2009 DEMO conference. At the time, SKOUT was available for users on non-iOS mobile internet devices through its website. Skout's Android app launched in August 2010.

SKOUT raised $22 million in venture capital from Andreessen Horowitz in April 2012. Prior to this investment, SKOUT had raised a collective $4.6 million in angel investment. In June 2012, SKOUT suspended its service for minors, after three separate incidents in which minors were allegedly raped by adults posing as teenagers. It later resumed its services for teenagers in July 2012 with after introducing additional safety measures.

SKOUT announced a travel feature that allows users to meet people in another city while traveling in 2013. SKOUT Travel is a premium paid feature. Another feature available on SKOUT is "Shake to Chat." Shake to Chat connects users to others who are shaking their phones at the same time. User profiles are anonymous for 40 seconds after the Shake to Chat conversation begins. In 2015, SKOUT launched Interested? - it uses the ‘Meet People’ search settings and instantly matches Skouters who share similar interests. SKOUT extended its services from 14 languages to 16 languages including Malay and Vietnamese in 2016.

In May 2014, the company acquired Nixter, a nightlife app which allows users to find nightlife events, buy tickets, and see guest lists for events in New York City, San Francisco, and Los Angeles. SKOUT launched Fuse, an app that gives users tools to construct their own social network that functions off the address book on their smartphone or tablet, in June 2014. In 2015, SKOUT announced that it had reached more than 10 million members.

== Funding ==
SKOUT has received $22 million in investment from Andreessen Horowitz and has been funded by early-stage investors including Jan Brandt, former vice chair of AOL; Jarl Mohn, founding president and CEO of Liberty Digital; and Hans Akerblom, founder and chair of Scandinavian Leadership AB. The board of directors includes, in addition to the founders, Stan Chudvosky, Scott Weiss, Herbert Madan and Board Observer Marc Andresseen. SKOUT reported that it became profitable in December 2013.
