= Starmedia =

Latin American Internet brand

- Website type: Latin internet
- Owners: Fernando Espuelas, first CEO & co-founder; Jack Chen, co-founder, Giuliano Stiglitz, CEO
- Website: www.starmedia.com
- Launched: 1996
- Current status: Active

StarMedia (stylized as starMedia) is a Latin American Internet brand, co-founded in August 1996 by Fernando Espuelas and Jack Chen as the first pan-regional Internet portal for Spanish and Portuguese speaking audiences.

== History ==
During the dot.com boom of the 1990s, StarMedia raised the first dollar of venture capital for a Latin Internet company which followed with the first IPO in its sector, while becoming one of the top 10 biggest websites on the Internet, measured by audience which is the site not written in English.

Under Espuelas' leadership, StarMedia launched a massive marketing effort to attract the very first Internet users, advertisers, and e-commerce companies across the Latin world. Called the "Espuelas Effect" by leading Brazilian news weekly Exame, StarMedia was the catalyst for the Internet industry throughout Latin America. While Espuelas was CEO, Starmedia was the leading Latin portal, serving over 25 million Spanish and Portuguese speakers every month across the Latin world.

In total, StarMedia raised over $500 million in a series of private and public offerings, reaching a market capitalization of over $3.8 billion at its peak. According to the Harvard Business School Case StarMedia: Launching a Latin American Revolution, by 1999 StarMedia was the Latin American market leader. StarMedia is now owned by France Telecom subsidiary Orange, serving "more than 24 million" Hispanic Internet users per month, according to company statements in 2008.

In 1996, Espuelas envisioned the portal that would “unite” Latin America: Starmedia. "With the Internet, we're talking about a fundamental shift in the power structure from the institution to the individual," Espuelas said.

After a frustrating year and a half of approaching venture capitalists to invest in his vision, only to have them uniformly refuse, many avowing that Latins "did not like technology" and would never use the Internet, the company went on to raise $2.5 million in 1997.

It was the first venture capital ever invested in a Latin Internet company. Over the next 4 years, the company raised over $500 million in investments, including capital from Chase Manhattan Bank, GE Capital, eBay, the Hearst Corporation, Intel Capital, NBC and David Rockefeller.

According to the New York City Investment Fund, "[Espuelas]...spoke about the impact, similar to that of economic integration on European nations, that his business would have unifying Latin American people separated by national borders. A board member interrupted him. It was David Rockefeller, retired head of Chase Manhattan, brother of Nelson, and a longtime pillar-the pillar-of corporate involvement in New York City life. Rockefeller wanted to hear more. He invited Espuelas to his office."

"It was the most exciting thing in my life," says the entrepreneur. He recalls how the meeting went: "I didn't close the sale with him until I showed him a map of Latin America without any borders. He said, 'Oh, that's good.'" Rockefeller and the Fund became investors in StarMedia, which moved its headquarters from Connecticut to the city and quickly grew to more than 700 employees worldwide. Espuelas tells this story at a reception that New York's corporate elite was throwing for Rockefeller's 86th birthday. He introduces Rockefeller as his "shareholder, partner, and inspiration."

"They have managed to come up with a pretty big capital raising at the intersection of two of the most volatile investment themes in America: the Internet and Latin America," said Lanny Baker, an analyst of on-line media industry for Salomon Smith Barney in San Francisco."

In 1999, the company went public on the Nasdaq, the first Latin Internet company to do so, eventually reaching a market valuation of over $3.8 billion USD at its peak. Starmedia had over 1,200 employees in 18 offices across 12 countries in the Americas and Europe. Today, Starmedia is France Telecom's single largest Internet operation in the world, according to company statements.

StarMedia, acquired by France Telecom in 2002, is a free-to-web global service connecting Spanish-speakers through the Internet as well as providing consumers relevant and extensive information and services. StarMedia has local operations in Colombia, Mexico, Peru, Spain, and throughout the United States (Los Angeles, Miami and New York)

== Founding, capitalization and growth ==
Fernando Espuelas and his childhood friend, Jack Chen, founded StarMedia in 1996 with $100,000 in personal savings, credit cards, and loans from friends and family.

A year later, after being turned down by over 50 venture capitalists across the U.S., the pair were successful in raising $3.5 million from Susan Segal, general partner of Chase Capital Partners and its technology affiliate Flatiron Partners. Soon after, StarMedia raised additional venture capital from WarburgPincus, the New York City Investment Fund and David Rockefeller. In 1998, StarMedia made history when it raised an additional $80 million in the largest private placement for an Internet company up to that time. David Rockefeller, wealthy Latin American families, Intel, the Hearst Corporation, Intel, NBC, and GE Capital were the principal investors in that round.

StarMedia went on to raise over $500 million in a combination of public and private offerings. Well before the twin stock market and Latin American collapses of 2000–2001, which severely impacted StarMedia's business and share price, major StarMedia investors had realized significant profits on their StarMedia investments. Investors such as WarburgPincus, Intel, GE Capital, Hearst and many other institutions and individuals sold their StarMedia shares at or near the peak of the market. Espuelas writes in his book Life in Action: “Because I believed in our company and our mission, I had never sold a single StarMedia share or stock option. I personally lost close to $500 million.”

According to the Harvard Business School case StarMedia: Launching a Latin American Revolution, written by professors Thomas Eisenmann and John K. Rust, "by the fall of 1999, StarMedia had sprinted to a sizable lead in the race to acquire Latin American Internet users. Its pan-regional, horizontal portal was the first to target Spanish and Portuguese-language speakers on the Internet, registering 1.2 billion page views in the third quarter of 1999. Thirty-three-year-old StarMedia co-founder Fernando Espuelas was the toast of "Silicon Alley" and a recognized hero throughout Latin America. A picture of him on the cover of Internet World magazine--ripping his shirt open to show the StarMedia logo, like Superman, summed up the spirit of the company."

StarMedia implemented Espuelas' relentless innovation strategy. StarMedia launched web-based email, chat, and streaming video in Spanish and Portuguese before its U.S.-focused competitors such as Yahoo, Excite, Lycos or AOL did in English.

StarMedia's webmail service, branded as LatinMail was a popular free email service, launched in 1997, 7 years before the creation of Gmail in 2004 as an early beta webmail service. LatinMail services were discontinued suddenly in 2017 with no prior notice from Starmedia.

StarMedia's chat was first introduced in 1999 and branded as LatinChat. StarMedia's chat service was very popular for some years and visited from all over Latin America since its launch until StarMedia discontinued the service in late 2017, disabling the website.

LatinMail and LatinChat websites and brands were registered as independent trademarks, operated as a service by StarMedia.

In 1996, Espuelas launched the first ever television campaign across Latin America promoting the Internet and the StarMedia brand, helping to spark the subsequent explosion of Internet use in the region. Along with CBS News, it launched the Web's first video news channel in 1997. Other innovations included the first instant messaging system in Latin America; in partnership with HP the first out-of-the-box e-commerce platform for small businesses; and with IBM, the first free ISP in the region. As part of Espuelas' push, StarMedia acquired 12 other media and technology companies in the U.S., Latin America, and Spain. At its peak, StarMedia had over 1,200 employees in 18 offices across 12 countries.

== First Public Offering of a Latin Internet Company ==
StarMedia went public on Nasdaq under stock symbol STRM, on May 25, 1999, in an IPO of 7 million shares priced at $15 per share, reaching a market capitalization of $1.2+ billion on its first day of trading. It was the first Latin Internet company to go public, creating what Brazil's leading business magazine Exame called the "Espuelas Effect", eventually reaching a market capitalization of more than $3.8 billion. According to the New York Times in an article from May 31, 1999, Espuelas, who had immigrated with his mother from Uruguay with $100, was worth over $160 million at the end of the first day of trading; at its peak, Espuelas' holdings in StarMedia were valued at over $500 million. He never sold any shares or stock options, as Espuelas wrote in Life in Action.

StarMedia became the best known, most highly traded Latin Internet Stock on Nasdaq during the late 1990s dot-com boom. Other stocks in the sector included Terra Networks and AOL Latin America.

== Technology market blow-up, Latin American regional bust and sale ==
During the .com bust of the early 2000s, which coincided with the worst Latin American economic collapse in a generation, StarMedia lost almost all of its market value and was the subject of class-action shareholder litigation. After an independent investigation initiated by a special committee of the Board of Directors found no wrongdoing by management, the Board's Audit Committee, and StarMedia's outside accountants, the class-action suit was settled by the Board and its insurance company. As part of the settlement, a full release was given by the shareholders to the former management, the company's outside accountants, Ernst & Young, and the Board's Audit Committee. The lawsuit was subsequently dismissed by the Federal judge.

In August 2001, Espuelas resigned as CEO after conflicts over strategy with the board of directors. Enrique Narciso was named CEO of the company. The Board, led by Chase Capital Partners' Susan Segal, decided to abandon Starmedia's core business to focus on the mobile solutions subsidiary, StarMedia Mobile. The StarMedia network of websites, related intellectual property, and over 25 million unique users per month audience were sold to the Spanish ISP eresMas Interactive for US$8 million in cash on July 3, 2002. The following week eresMas, now claiming to be the leader of the Spanish-language Internet industry because of its acquisition of StarMedia, was acquired by France Telecom subsidiary Wanadoo SA (now called Orange after a rebranding in 2006) for more than $255 million euros.

According to Orange, StarMedia is the leading Spanish-language portal in the world. Since 2009 Starmedia is part of Orange Advertising Network Americas, run by CEO Giuliano Stiglitz. Orange Advertising Network Americas is one of the leading players in US Hispanic and Latin American online marketing.

In 2002, led by Board of Directors Chair Susan Segal, StarMedia Mobile was renamed CycleLogic and shareholders approved a one-for-1,000 reverse stock split. Shortly thereafter, CycleLogic deregistered its shares from NASDAQ. Segal ran the company until it filed for bankruptcy in 2003.

In March 2004 the assets of CycleLogic were acquired out of bankruptcy by an international group of investors, becoming a part of the IMS group of companies, Intelligent Mobile Solutions Inc.
