= Mentez =

Mentez logo

Mentez is a Latin American-focused social network game publisher based in Miami.

Mentez is significant because the company is the leading social game publisher in Latin America, a rapidly growing social network and gaming area of the world. Paymentez processes more than 45,000 transactions a day.

As of August 2010, the company had 21 games on Orkut and 7 games on Facebook, with more than 22 million weekly active players.

Mentez signed a distribution agreement with Zynga in 2011 be a distributor of Zynga Game Cards and PINS at more than 1 million retail locations and Internet cafes across.

Mentez signed a distribution agreement with Disney-owned Playdom in 2010 to publish several games in Latin America. These include Tiki Resort and Bola.

Mentez operates an alternative payments network in Brazil called Paymentez. As of August 2010, users could buy Paymentez credits at 25,000 internet cafes or 100,000 retail locations across Brazil.

Mentez received an undisclosed amount of funding in 2010 from Insight Venture Partners.

Juan F Franco is currently Mentez CEO, Jaime Roldan is Mentez CTO and Juan Roldan is Mentez VP Content. The company was founded by Juan Franco, Jaime Roldan and Tahiana D'Egmont in Brazil.
