= Tagged (website) =

Social discovery website

- Website type: Social networking service
- Available in: English, Spanish, Portuguese, Dutch, French, German, Malay
- Owner: The Meet Group
- Founders: Greg Tseng; Johann Schleier-Smith
- Employees: 150 (October 2011)
- Website: www.tagged.com
- Registration: Required
- Launched: October 2004; 22 years ago

Tagged is an American social discovery website based in San Francisco, California, founded in 2004. It allows members to browse the profiles of any other members, and share tags and virtual gifts. Tagged claims it has 300 million members as of 2014. As of September 2011, Quantcast estimates Tagged monthly unique users at 5.9 million in the United States, and 18.6 million globally. Michael Arrington wrote in April 2011 that Tagged is most notable for the ability to grow profitably during the era of Facebook.

In 2009, Tagged was criticized for sending deceptive Email spam and paid $1.4 million in legal settlements regarding those practices. The company has since adopted privacy reforms and changed its invitation processes.

Owned by Ifwe, Inc., it is an Inc. 500 company ranking #476 on the 2010 Inc. list of fastest-growing independent U.S. private companies and #80 on Forbes' 2011 list of America's Most Promising Companies.

On April 3, 2017, the company was acquired by The Meet Group.

== History ==
Tagged Inc. was co-founded in mid-2004 by entrepreneurs Greg Tseng and Johann Schleier-Smith, who wanted to build a "Teen Yahoo! or the next MTV". The pair had formerly co-founded internet incubator Jumpstart Technologies, which was later fined $900,000 for alleged violations of the CAN-SPAM Act, then the largest-ever penalty for spam.

In September 2005 the company raised $1.5 million in angel investor funding and three months later raised an additional $7 million from Mayfield Fund, a venture capital firm.

Originally an under-18 site, Tagged allowed users of any age to join from October 2006.

In March 2008, Microsoft announced a commercial partnership with social networking sites Tagged, Facebook, LinkedIn, Bebo, and hi5 regarding email contacts APIs, which has since been implemented. Other past and current Tagged partnerships have included Slide, RockYou, PhotoBucket, Meebo, Razz, and Jangl. In February 2009, following complaints from the public Tagged was blocked in Qatar by the only ISP, Qtel, due to inappropriate content that Qtel could not selectively filter. Tagged.com had been one of the top ten most visited sites in Qatar.

In January 2010, Tagged announced that it was donating $50,000 to the Yéle Haiti Earthquake Fund, partly stemming from user donations. In the same month, Tagged won a $200,000 judgment against Erik Voegler, who was spamming other Tagged users.

In October 2010, Tagged ranked #100 on Deloitte's list of the top 500 fastest growing technology, media, telecommunications, life sciences and clean technology companies in North America.

In April 2011, Tagged acquired Digsby, a multi-protocol instant messenger and social network notification client for Windows with 3 million registered users.

As of October 2011, Tagged had 150 employees, an increase from 55 employees at the beginning of 2011. CEO Greg Tseng continues to interview employees, cater lunch and dinner, and hold office-wide meetings every Friday. Tagged is a member of the Social Media Advertising Consortium, a trade industry association that aims to increase advertising revenue and to facilitate collaboration among social networking sites, advertisers, and marketing researchers.

In September 2011, Tagged made a second acquisition, the gaming application WeGame.

In November 2011, Tagged was named to the Forbes list of "America's Most Promising Companies".

In December 2011, Tagged acquired Hi5 Networks Inc., which was once the third-largest social network behind Facebook and MySpace. The deal, whose terms were not disclosed, added Hi5's 230 million members to Tagged's base of 100 million registered users.

Also in December 2011, Tagged acquired Topicmarks, a natural language processing and machine learning company.

=== Deceptive bulk email ===
Between April and June 2009, Tagged sent tens of millions of misleading spam emails like this one, which falsely stated that a contact sent photographs to the recipient.

In June 2009, Time magazine columnist Sean Gregory called Tagged "The world's most annoying website". Tagged asked users for their email username and password, retrieved email addresses from their address books, and repeatedly sent email invitations to people who were not registered on Tagged, falsely stating that they have been "added as a friend" or that the inviter had sent them photos on Tagged. This process has been labelled an "e-mail scam" by consumer anti-fraud advocates and drawn criticism in the technology press and from users. The emails were discussed as possible spam by Black Web 2.0 and the resemblance to a virus was noted by Snopes.com. The New York Times referred to the practice as "contact scraping".

In July 2009 New York State Attorney General Andrew Cuomo announced his intention to sue Tagged for "deceptive email marketing and invasion of privacy". Tagged reached a settlement in which it agreed to pay $500,000 and to modify its promotional practices. Simultaneously, Tagged settled an enforcement action by the state of Texas, agreeing to pay $250,000 in penalties and fees. Conditions of the settlement included "clear and conspicuous" disclosure of the use of information in the user's email address book, providing a clear method to skip the step and display to users the specific emails to be sent. Tagged has adopted these reforms and changed its invitation processes.

In February 2010, Tagged settled a class action lawsuit about its former registration process with California residents Miriam Slater and Sara Golden and awarded them $10,000 each. Tagged also agreed to destroy email addresses that were collected from users between April and June 2009, if those users did not mean to invite their contacts to the site.

In April 2010, San Francisco District Attorney Kamala Harris announced that Tagged agreed to pay $650,000 to settle claims of deceptive emails. This settlement related to emails sent from April 2009 through June 2009.

=== Aborted IPO, shift in focus ===
In October 2014, Tagged aborted plans to perform an initial public offering, citing decreased revenue due to the proliferation of mobile devices. On October 16, 2014, Tagged performed a number of changes at the corporate level, including acquiring the social messaging startup Tinode and naming its co-founders, Dash Gopinath and Gene Sokolov, to the positions of chief product officer and senior vice president of engineering, respectively. Tagged also announced that its parent company would be re-named Ifwe, Inc. (stylized If(we), and that the company overall would focus on becoming an incubator for new mobile software, although it will continue to run Tagged and Hi5.

== Website ==
After registering a free account, Tagged users can customize their profile page, to which they can post a biography about themselves and their interests, post status updates, upload photos, and send and receive messages. There is also an option to upgrade the membership for a monthly fee, which allows users to see which other users have recently viewed their profile, among other additional features. They can also sort videos by most viewed, top rated, and most liked, and send virtual gifts to their friends. Virtual gifts are bought with "gold" which users buy with actual money or receive by completing special offers or tasks. There are chat rooms where users engage in real time online chat according to their age and mood. Designed to facilitate relationships and dating, Tagged allows users to send and receive notifications for "Luv", "Winks", and "Meet Me", a rating engine that allows users to rate the attractiveness of photos submitted by others. On October 30, 2009, Tagged announced a simpler signup process.

=== Mobile versions ===
Tagged developed a mobile version of its site in April 2011, making Tagged more usable by smartphones with a mobile internet browser. This version allows users to send and receive friend requests, play games, and send messages. This mobile version also offers location-based, real-time chat for users. Tagged began offering an iPhone application from July 2010, which was downloaded more than 100,000 times in its first week. Tagged's Android application became available in March 2011. By April 2011, the Android versions, had slightly more users than on the iPhone application, and in May 2011 it was the number three social networking application on the Android. In the latest update of their iOS and Android Apps, Tagged has added the capability of refreshing data by using the "pulling down" gesture and loading more data by using the "pulling up" gesture. In June 2011 Tagged launched its first BlackBerry application. Being a native application, it runs on a mixture of HTML and the device systems.

=== Social games ===
Social games on Tagged differ from those on other social networking services, because players are encouraged to make new friends through the games. In May 2010, Tagged opened its own in-house gaming division. Leading the division is Andrew Pedersen, former vice president of the Pogo division of Electronic Arts. Tagged plans to create more social games, several of which are already in development. Together with its acquisition of Digsby, Tagged's focus on social games signals an attempt to add more social communication options to its platform.

Launched in 2008, Pets was Tagged's first game and, as of May 2011, remains the most popular. Similar to a fantasy sports league, players use virtual money to "buy" others and own them like pets, then barter them with other players or sell at a set price. Virtual cash can be earned by players in several ways, such as frequently logging into Tagged, converting Tagged gold at the Pets Cash Bar into Pets Cash and using real money.

Farm was introduced in May 2011. Unlike Zynga's Farmville on Facebook, there is no animation or farmer. Advancement is based on virtual money earned by harvesting plants and animals in the game. Other past games on Tagged included Zynga games such as Mafia Wars and Poker and Crowdstar's Happy Aquarium.

== Child safety ==
Initially targeting U.S. teens, Tagged opened to users worldwide aged 13 and older in October 2006 and still maintains security measures for users under 18. Users over 16 and the public cannot view the profiles of 13- and 14-year-olds, and profiles for 15- and 16-year-olds are private to the public and to users over 18. The only way to add teens as friends is by knowing the email address or surnames to request the friendship, and the younger user must accept the friendship request.

However, the security measures are not entirely successful. In February 2009, a high-school teacher was arrested after having sex with a 14-year-old girl he had met on Tagged. The 32-year-old teacher, who was not listed on either state or national sex offender websites, had over 100 female friends below the age of 17.

In December 2009 New York State Attorney General Andrew Cuomo announced that Tagged and 13 other social networking sites agreed to remove registered sex offenders under the New York Electronic Securing and Targeting of Online Predators Act. Nevertheless, a 2010 undercover investigation by Cuomo's office claimed that graphic images of children being sexually abused were readily accessible on Tagged. Investigators registered accounts at Tagged and reported inappropriate content to Tagged administrators following procedures described on the site. They found "significant lapses" in Tagged's response to these reports. At a news conference, Cuomo referred to Tagged as "one of the worst social networking sites that we've encountered".

As of February 20, 2014, users must be at least 18 years old to have an account on Tagged.

== User demographics and site traffic ==
As of April 2011, Alexa rankings suggest the popularity of Tagged peaked in early 2009 and has been declining since. Each month Tagged is visited by 5.9 million American users and 18.6 million users worldwide. Hitwise data shows that between December 2008 and December 2009 Facebook drove category growth, and the only other site to grow in market share during that period was Tagged, which increased its share by 35%. In September 2009, Tagged had a 2.38% share of the social networking site market in the United States based on monthly visits.

Though originally a teen-only site, Tagged now has more members in the 35- to 49-year-old group than in any other; as of 2011, teens in the United States accounted for 10% of its members. Sixty-four percent of users earn under $60,000 per year and 60% have less than a college education. In the United States, users of Tagged are more likely than Internet users in general to be female or African American.

Eighty percent of Tagged users also use Facebook. According to ComScore December 2009 data, users spent two minutes longer on average on Tagged than Facebook users do on Facebook.

In May 2010, ComScore reported that Tagged entered the top 10 U.S. Online Display Ad Publishers for the first time. Tagged.com was ranked at number 10 with a 0.6% share of the total market, having served 6.8 billion ads in the United States in the first quarter 2010.

In September 2010, Tagged surpassed 100 million registered members, of whom a quarter to a third were active monthly. Revenue grew to over $30 million, and 2011 revenue was predicted by Tseng to be over $50 million.

== See also ==
- The Meet Group
- Hi5
- Online dating service
