= Hi5 =

American social networking service

hi5

- Screenshot Screenshot of Hi5's sign up/log in
- Website type: Social networking service
- Available in: Multilingual
- Owner: The Meet Group
- Founder: Ramu Yalamanchi
- Website: hi5.com
- Commercial: yes
- Registration: Required
- Launched: June 27, 2003; 23 years ago
- Current status: Discontinued

Previous Hi5 logo used until 2010.

Map of countries with most users of Hi5

hi5 was an American social networking service based in San Francisco, California. It is owned by The Meet Group.

Users could create a profile and provide personal information including interests, age, photos, and hometown. Users could also send friend requests via email to other users. When a person received a friend request, they could accept or decline it, or block the user altogether. If the user accepts another user as a friend, the two would be connected directly or in the 1st degree. The user would then appear on the person's contact list and vice versa. Users could opt to make their profile viewable to everyone on hi5, or only viewable to people in their network. hi5 was marketed to users interested in flirting, dating, and making new friends. In order to join hi5, users had to be at least 18 years or older.

In a 2009 redesign, hi5 added features oriented toward gaming and entertainment. The site featured over 200 games in a variety of genres, and was adding games at a rate of 2-3 per week. Due to hi5's shift in focus to social gaming, Comscore reclassified hi5 as an online gaming site in early 2011. According to comScore, hi5 ranked as the 6th most trafficked online gaming site.

== History ==
The company was founded in 2003 by Ramu Yalamanchi. It was profitable in its first year.

By 2006, it had become the 8th largest social networking service.

Prior to 2004, the company had raised $250,000 from angel investors.

By 2007, it was the 2nd largest social networking service after Myspace.

In 2007, the company raised $20 million in a series A round from Mohr Davidow Ventures, as well as $15 million in venture debt.

In 2008, comScore reported that hi5 was the third most popular social networking service in monthly unique visitors behind Facebook and MySpace. It was also the fastest growing social network. However, international growth of Facebook later hurt hi5. It was most popular in Latin America.

The company had gained significant market share in Europe, Latin America, and Asia, and Mary Meeker had cited hi5 as the 10th largest site in the World in her 2007 Technology / Internet Trends report.

Bill Gossman was appointed CEO in April 2009, and at that time, hi5 refocused itself as a social-network game platform and opened itself to new game developers.

In early 2010, hi5 acquired social gaming company Big Six.

In 2010, it announced it had raised $3 million convertible note from existing investor Mohr Davidow, bringing the funding up to $38 million.

In October 2010, hi5 announced Sociopath, a set of developer tools designed to make it easier for developers to bring their game to the hi5 platform. A major part of the program was the implementation of Facebook compatible APIs, which simplified the process of bringing games already developed for Facebook to hi5. Sociopath also introduced anonymous play to the site, making it easier for gamers to play games immediately without first having to provide registration info. Sociopath was initially introduced at GDC Online in 2010.

In July 2010, the company raised $14 million from Crosslink Capital.

In January 2011, Alex St. John joined the company as President and CTO.

As a companion to Sociopath, hi5 introduced Sociopay in early 2011. Sociopay was intended to help hi5 to better monetize users, increasing revenues for themselves and developers. Sociopay automatically adjusts the prices for hi5 coins based upon a user's region, capitalizing on hi5's international success and helping to monetize users from many different economies. Sociopay also helps monetize users less likely to purchase coins by instead serving them advertisements.

In December 2011, the assets of the company were acquired by Tagged.

After selling to Tagged, the management team of hi5 formed magi.com as a pure gaming site open to other game developers. Magi.com was shut down in June 2012.

With Tagged's acquisition of hi5, the gaming platform changed from third-party developed games to games developed by Tagged's in-house team. Tagged noted that hi5's games weren't as "vibrant" as they could be.

In 2017, Tagged and hi5 were acquired by The Meet Group for $60 million. The Meet Group would later end support for hi5. The site's URL now re-directs to Tagged.

== See also ==
- List of social networking services
- VK
- Facebook
- Friendster
- Orkut
