= Fred Mossler =

American business executive (born 1966)

Fred Mossle
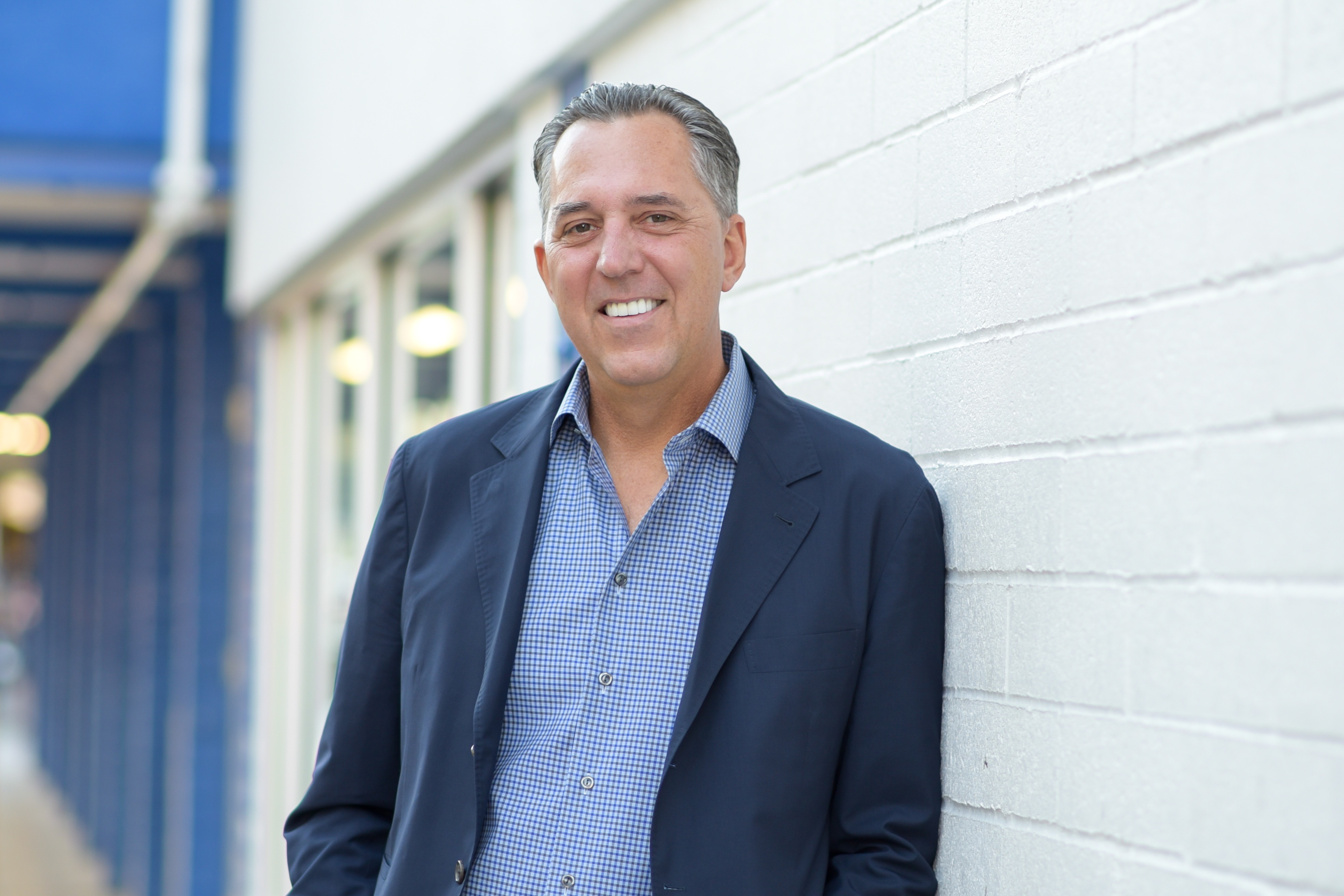
- Mossler in 2020
- Born: Fred Mossler; July 2, 1966 (age 59); San Francisco, California
- Citizenship: United States
- Occupations: business executive, fashion guru, philanthropist.
- Known for: Zappos Executive, Founder of Honus Capital, LLC, Co-founder of Ross and Snow

Fred Mossler (born July 2, 1966) is a business executive, fashion guru and philanthropist. He is best known as a former high-ranking executive at online shoe retailer Zappos, where he played a significant role in the company’s growth, as well as being the founder of Las Vegas-centric investment fund Honus Capital, LLC and co-founder of luxury fashion brand Ross and Snow.

== Business ==
After graduating with a business degree from Southern Oregon University in 1990, Mossler moved to Seattle and joined Nordstrom in 1991. He spent the next eight years at Nordstrom, living in Sacramento, Hawaii, and San Francisco.

In 1999, while working for Nordstrom in San Francisco, Mossler was contacted by Zappos founder Nick Swinmurn to join his new company, then known as ShoeSite.com. Initially the Senior Vice President of Merchandising at Zappos, Mossler’s responsibilities expanded to overseeing a variety of departments, including the Customer Loyalty Team, Human Resources, Recruiting, Benefits, and Marketing. His wide range of duties led to his official position with the company to be known as “No Title”. During Fred Mossler's tenure at Zappos, the company abolished its traditional hierarchy and adopted holacracy.

In April 2016, Mossler announced his departure from Zappos after nearly 17 years at the company, citing his desire to pursue full-time entrepreneurship. In the email announcing his departure, Mossler stated that he would remain with the company until June 3, 2016, to aid with the transition, and would remain in Las Vegas to focus on several projects in the area, including the Downtown Project (a downtown revitalization project started by Zappos CEO Tony Hsieh), Mexican restaurant chain Nacho Daddy, area cultural festival Life is Beautiful and “close air support” training company Blue Air Training. As co-founder of Nacho Daddy, Mossler has overseen the growth of the chain to three Las Vegas-area locations, and has made a food-donation program central to the restaurant's ethos: via the "Buy One, Give One" program, the chain has donated over 110,000 meals to local Vegas-area foodbank Three Square. In addition, as a partner in the Downtown Las Vegas music festival, Life is Beautiful, he has helped oversee the festival's growth into one of the regions most important arts events, with over 100,000 attendees in 2016 and music stars from an international roster of Platinum acts performing on stage (Stevie Wonder, Duran Duran, Snoop Dogg, Imagine Dragon).

On March 24, 2017, Footwear Daily reported that Mossler would be launching a footwear brand in Las Vegas, Nevada. Former Zappos executives, Fred Mossler and Meghan Mossler founded Ross & Snow, a luxury fashion brand with its factories being shared with couture brands in Italy.

As of March 21, 2018, Mossler has joined with partners Tony Hsieh, Cory Harwell and Keith Glynn to form Eleven Hospitality Group, an entity created to take popular Downtown Las Vegas restaurant Carson Kitchen from a local favorite to a national brand. A letter of intent has already been signed to open an Atlanta location.

Mossler and his partners have also been involved in the creation of and investment in Discount Italian Shoes, offering Italian fashion brands at lower price points to international consumers.

== Philanthropy ==
Mossler serves as an honorary director of the Goodie Two Shoes Foundation, an organization that provides disadvantaged children and children in crisis with new shoes and socks. He holds a role on the Finance Committee of the Two Ten Footwear Foundation, which offers financial assistance, counseling, community resources, and scholarships to those working in the footwear industry. In this role he recently helped the foundation raise over $4 million at their 2019 gala. In addition, Mossler was involved with the Movember Foundation, a charity raising funds for promoting and researching men’s health.

== Community involvement and other ventures ==
Mossler has participated in the TED conference series, presenting a TEDx talk in Las Vegas titled “Flourishing Communities: Live, Work, and Play” that outlines the transformation of a previously unused area of downtown Las Vegas into a cultural and economic hotspot.

He is on the board of the Downtown Project, a $350 million revitalization project in downtown Las Vegas. In addition to real estate, the project also invests in small businesses, arts and culture, education, healthcare, and tech startups. Tech investments are handled through the Downtown Project’s tech investment arm, VegasTechFund, in which Mossler holds the title of Limited Partner.

Mossler is an investor in Silver State Production Services, a Las Vegas-based film production company that has worked on projects such as Looking Glass (2017) and The Hangover Part III. He is also an executive producer on the movie Viena and the Fantomes released in 2020.

Mossler contributed to Zappos CEO Tony Hsieh’s book, Delivering Happiness, discussing how Zappos approaches vendor relationships. The book reached #1 on the New York Times and USA Today bestseller lists.

In 2012, Mossler founded Honus Capital LLC, a hands-on investment fund for Las Vegas-area entrepreneurs.

In May 2017, Mossler became an active member of the Board of Directors of LivePerson, a mobile and online messaging and analytics solutions provider. As the company enters a growth and expansion phase, Mossler is expected to provide digital sales and growth strategy expertise.

In August 2019, Mossler and his wife were featured in Footwear News magazine as "local guides" to their home, Las Vegas, offering their recommendation for "go-to Vegas hangs." Mossler was also in attendance this same month at the FN Platform, a gathering for Footwear Industry "power players."

In October, 2019, Mossler was included in a team of expert judges to ascertain the "Startup of the Year," choosing re:3D for their advancements in the 3D market. In October 2020, Mossler joined The Board of Trustees for his alma mater, Southern Oregon University where he serves on the Development Committee.
