= Scott Banister =

American entrepreneur and angel investor

- Born: 1975 (age 50–51); Kansas City, Missouri
- Education: University of Illinois at Urbana-Champaign (no degree, dropped out)
- Occupations: Entrepreneur, investor
- Known for: Co-founder of IronPort
- Spouse: Cyan Banister

Scott Banister (born 1975) is an American entrepreneur, startup founder, and angel investor. He cofounded the anti-spam company IronPort, and he was an early advisor and board member at PayPal. Ali Partovi credits him with the conception of paid search advertising via keyword auction, a core business model for internet advertising companies.

Banister is a marijuana rights activist and was a supporter of Republican Senator Rand Paul in the 2016 presidential race.

== Early life and career ==
Banister is the son of Debbie and Bruce Banister (1951–2006), a civil engineer who lived in Kansas City, Missouri. According to Jimmy Soni,

Hailing from Missouri, Banister took to technology early. In high school, and then college, he kindled a passion for creating websites and came to UIUC because of its exceptional reputation in computer science... Banister also chafed against the confines of traditional education, and he began to treat college as a target to hack. He devised workarounds to UIUC rules, including an audacious scheme in which he created a company, hired himself as an intern, then used the internship to earn course credit.

Banister's original intent in attending UIUC was to become a professor of computer science. Michael Ellsberg wrote that like other entrepreneurs, Scott Banister relentlessly looked at the outcome he wanted to produce in the world and relentlessly focused on how to achieve that outcome. Characterizing Banister as a "self-educated serial entrepreneur", Ellsberg quotes Banister: "I found quickly that, by day I was going to class, learning a bunch of abstract, theoretical stuff, whereas by night, I was working on a business. I could see that business is how things actually get done in the world, and how people make money in the world: you build stuff, things that consumers want."

Computerworld reported that Banister got his first idea to capitalize on existing search engine workhorses to help retailers advertise their presence on the Web. He and friends posted a free registry service, ListServe, the precursor of Submit It!.

In the summer of 1995, while still attending University of Illinois at Urbana–Champaign, Banister cofounded SponsorNet New Media, Inc., with friends, fellow students Max Levchin and Luke Nosek. The three had set up office at the university's chapter of the Association for Computing Machinery (ACM), and the Department of Computer Science newsletter reported they had "installed a microcontroller on a vintage Dr Pepper vending machine and hooked it up to the internet so that students could buy soda by swiping their student ID cards".

Outside the classroom, Banister had taught himself HTML, got a job as a webmaster working with faculty member Burks Oakley, and according to UIUC's Department of Computer Science, Alumni News, started three web companies: SponsorNet, the first advertising network and the first online auction for advertising space, Permalink.com, a provider of lifetime URLs and lifetime e-mail addresses, and Submit lt!, an advertising tool for websites.

Banister was the first of the three friends to leave for Silicon Valley and the first to sell a start-up. He left college during his sophomore year in 1996 to cofound Submit It!, the free, automated resource to advertise on multiple search engines. Ali Partovi called it "a simple but elegant concept that turned out to be one of the best business ideas in history". Submit It! was acquired by LinkExchange in June 1998, and Microsoft acquired LinkExchange in December 1998. Submit lt!, ListBot, and Banister's ClickTrade then became a part of MSN's LinkExchange.

In December 2000, with Scott Weiss, Banister cofounded IronPort to stop porn from flooding corporate in-boxes. The anti-spam company was acquired in 2007 by Cisco for US$830 million.

Banister has worked with other start-ups as a board member and investor, including eVoice, the first email-enabled home voicemail service acquired by AOL in 2001. He served as VP of Ideas at idealab!, where he contributed the unique bid-for-placement search engine model that powers Overture.

He was an early investor in Powerset, a startup building a natural language search engine. His other angel investments include Uber, Zappos.com, LiveOps, Facebook, Hi5.com, Tagged.com, iLike, Causes.com, Topsy Labs, Teleport, Inc. and TekTrak. Banister also cofounded Zivity, an adult-themed social networking site, with his wife, Cyan Banister, and Jeffrey Wescott.

David Gelles has identified Banister as one of the PayPal Mafia, former board members of PayPal, influential investors in "a collection of some of the most valuable technology start-ups ever seen". He invested in PayPal's earliest version, and he served as a founding board member. In a 2019 VentureBeat article, Andrew Ganato and Scy Yoon wrote that Peter Thiel and Scott Banister had been the most prolific investors, each responsible for investing in more than 100 companies. In that article, Ganato and Yoon provide a net graph showing the interconnections among PayPal Mafia members' investments.

== Personal life ==
Banister met his wife Cyan when she was managing IronPort's blacklist of spammers, and they married two years later.

Banister is a marijuana rights activist, supporting legalization in Arizona and other states. At UIUC, he served as president of the College Libertarians, and co-founded Campus Atheists & Agnostics.

He was a supporter of Republican Senator Rand Paul. In 2015, Banister donated $3 million to a Super PAC supporting Paul's presidential bid. He later switched his endorsement to Ted Cruz after Paul suspended his campaign.

Banister lives in Half Moon Bay, California.

== Awards and honors ==
Cyan and Scott Banister won the Angel of the Year Crunchie award at the 2016 TechCrunch ceremonies. Jessi Hempel of Wired wrote that they "won TechCrunch's Angel of the Year award last spring for prescient bets on SpaceX, Uber, and DeepMind Technologies".

In 2015, Eugene Volokh announced that the UCLA First Amendment Amicus Brief Clinic would be renamed the Scott & Cyan Banister First Amendment Clinic, "in recognition of the Banisters' very generous gift in support of the clinic".
