= Amy Jo Martin =

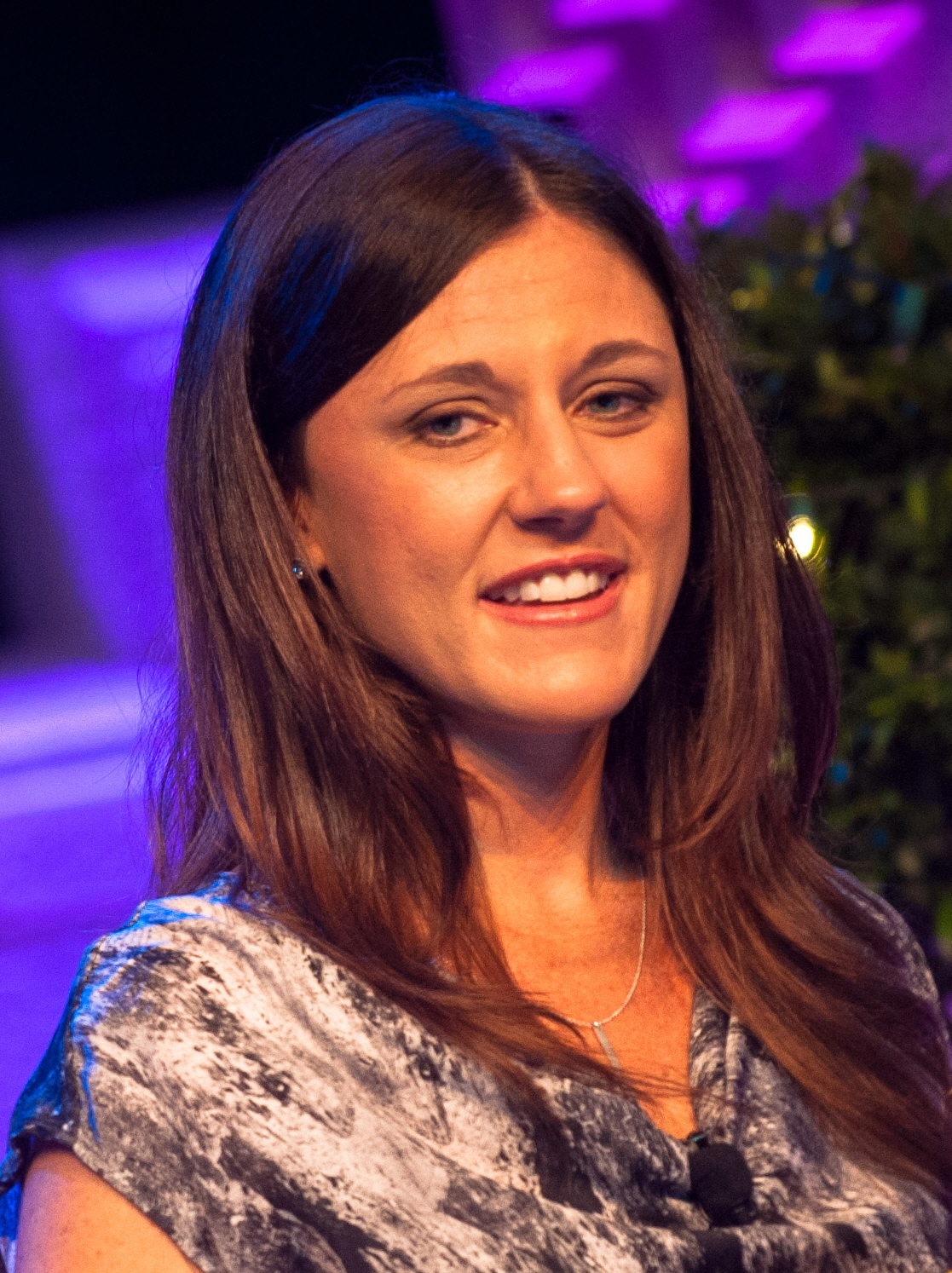
- Born: July 5, 1979 (age 47); Green River, Wyoming, U.S.
- Education: Arizona State University (BS)
- Website: amyjomartin.com

Amy Jo Martin (born July 5, 1979, in Green River, Wyoming), is an American author, speaker, entrepreneur, and investor. She is the author of the New York Times best-selling book Renegades Write the Rules, Founder and CEO of Renegade Global, host of the Why Not Now? podcast and founder of the Renegade Accelerator.

Martin is an investor in Kitu Life Inc. Super Coffee, CourtAvenue, AnthemIQ, beam, and Elevate Growth Partners.

In October 2012, Martin published her first book, Renegades Write the Rules, which reveals the innovative strategies behind the social media success of today's top celebrities, brands, and sports icons. During its first week of publication, Renegades Write the Rules made The New York Times Best Seller list.

With more than 1.2 million Twitter followers, Martin travels the world speaking and educating audiences on the power of social media, the latest social media trends, how to build a personal brand using social media and on personal and business innovation. Speaking events vary from TEDx, Social Media Mom's Celebration at Walt Disney World, MasterCard Worldwide HQ and espnW Women + Sports Summit to the Harvard Business School and BlogHer 2012.

She is a regular contributor to Fast Company, Harvard Business Review, Sports Business Journal and Self. She has been mentioned in publications such as Forbes, Self, Mashable, Sports Illustrated, Men's Journal, ESPN, MSNBC, Fast Company, The New York Times, USA Today, GQ, Vanity Fair, CNBC, Time, and BusinessWeek, among others.

Martin founded and served as CEO of Digital Royalty. Headquartered in downtown Las Vegas, Nevada, Digital Royalty was a social media and education company that helped individuals and brands build, measure and monetize their digital universe. Tony Hsieh, CEO of Zappos, and Baron Davis, NBA player, invested in Amy Jo's agency, and after a successful seven-year run growing the business in ten different countries, Amy Jo exited that company in 2016.

Martin began her career in account management at an advertising firm. In 2006, she went to work for the NBA's Phoenix Suns and became the director of digital media and research. During her time at the Suns, Martin pioneered how NBA teams integrate social media and organized the first ever NBA Tweet Up with Shaquille O'Neal. Martin and O'Neal were of the first accounts on Twitter to become verified.

In 2009, Martin founded Digital Royalty, where she helped former Suns player Shaquille O'Neal develop a strategy for his Twitter presence. He has since become one of the most influential celebrities using social media, with more than 6.2 million Twitter followers, and 3.1 million Facebook likes.

Martin's other clients have included Dwayne "The Rock" Johnson, Dana White, the Ultimate Fighting Championship, DoubleTree by Hilton, Delivering Happiness, Self, Chicago White Sox, FOX Sports, Los Angeles Kings, Monte Carlo Resort and Casino, Hard Rock Hotel & Casino, Texas A&M, WWE, Jabbawockeez, Strikeforce, Station Casinos, Century Martial Arts, Discount Tire Company, and the Cleveland Indians.

In 2011, Martin launched Digital Royalty University, which offered customized education programs including strategic and tactical social media training for all individuals within a company. Digital Royalty University trained thousands of employees worldwide for global brands such as DoubleTree by Hilton and FOX Sports among others.

In 2012, New York Knicks player Baron Davis and Zappos CEO Tony Hsieh partnered with Amy Jo Martin. As a result, Digital Royalty relocated its headquarters to Las Vegas to become part of the Downtown Las Vegas Revitalization Project.

Also in October 2012, Digital Royalty launched a new online, automated education platform as part of Digital Royalty University, which offered social media, culture, and personal innovation classes that taught individuals, small businesses and entrepreneurs how to increase their influence online and strengthen their brands. In conjunction with the launch, Digital Royalty partnered with non-profit organization Teach for America to introduce its Buy One Give One Program. For every hour of social media education purchased, Digital Royalty University gave an hour of social media education to a teacher.

Martin currently lives in Austin, Texas, with her husband and son.

== Accomplishments ==
- In April 2009, Martin launched Digital Royalty where she is the founder and CEO. Shaquille O'Neal was her first client. In December 2009, Martin was named one of Arizona's "35 Entrepreneurs 35 & Younger" by The Arizona Republic.
- Soon after, Martin was featured in a Vanity Fair article titled "America's Tweethearts" which featured six women, including Felicia Day and Sarah Austin, who use Twitter.
- In April 2010, Martin and the major league baseball team Cleveland Indians launched an in-stadium social media section called the "Tribe Social Deck" available to bloggers and social media influencers.
- In August 2010, Martin was named one of the 20 Best-Branded Women on Twitter by Forbes along with businesswoman and socialite Ivanka Trump, television news journalist Ann Curry and actress Alyssa Milano.
- During the summer of 2010, Martin and Digital Royalty developed and integrated a cross-platform social media campaign to promote the eight-week cross-country bus tour of New York Times #1 bestseller Delivering Happiness.
- In January 2012, Martin was invited to speak at TEDx 2012, where she discussed how to innovate your personal and professional life.
- Forbes covered Amy Jo's innovative idea "Ready, Set, Pause", which encourages people to take 8-minute breaks during the workday to reduce stress and boost productivity.
- In January 2022, Amy Jo and Team Renegade launched Renegade Global, designed to propel corporate teams and independent female leaders, executives, and founders to success in a rapidly shifting workplace and economy.
