= Billboard charts =

Music sales rankings by the trade magazine Billboard

Billboard logo

The Billboard charts tabulates the relative weekly popularity of songs and albums in the United States and globally. The results are published in Billboard magazine. Billboard biz, the online extension of the Billboard charts, provides additional weekly charts, as well as year-end charts. The three main charts are the Billboard Global 200 for songs globally, the Billboard Hot 100 for songs in the United States, and the Billboard 200 for albums in the United States. In addition to these, other Billboard charts exclusively feature a specific genre such as R&B, country, or rock, or cover all genres. The charts can be ranked according to sales, streams, or airplay, and for main song charts such as the Hot 100 or Global 200 song charts, all three sources are used in their compilation. For the Billboard 200 album chart, streams and track sales are included in addition to album sales.

The weekly sales and streams charts have been monitored on a Friday-to-Thursday cycle since July 2015; previously it was on a Monday-to-Sunday cycle. Radio airplay song charts, however, follow the Monday-to-Sunday cycle (previously Wednesday-to-Tuesday). The charts are released each Tuesday with an issue date the following Saturday.

== History ==
The first chart published by Billboard was "Last Week's Ten Best Sellers Among The Popular Songs", a list of best-selling sheet music, in July 1913. Other early charts listed popular song performances in theatres and recitals in different cities. In 1928, "Popular Numbers Featured by Famous Singers and Leaders" appeared, which added radio performances to in-person performances. On January 4, 1936, Billboard magazine published its first pop chart based on record sales. Titled "Ten Best Records for Week Ending", it listed the ten top-selling records of three leading record companies as reported by the companies themselves. In March 1937, the "Songs with the Most Radio Plugs" chart debuted with data from a separate company. In October 1938, a review list, "The Week's Best Records", was retitled "The Billboard Record Buying Guide" by incorporating airplay and sheet music sales, which eventually became the first trade survey of record popularity.

In the July 27, 1940, issue, the first "Billboard Music Popularity Chart" was published for the week ending July 20, with separate listings covering retail sales, sheet music sales, jukebox song selection and radio play. Among the lists were the ten songs of the "Best Selling Retail Records", which is the fore-runner of today's pop chart, with "I'll Never Smile Again" by Tommy Dorsey (featuring vocals by Frank Sinatra) its first number one. This best-seller chart (also known as "Best Sellers in Stores" and "Best Selling Pop Singles in Stores") is considered the true guide to a song's popularity until the creation of the Hot 100 in 1958. Another accolade of a successful song was a position on the "Honor Roll of Hits", introduced on March 24, 1945, initially as a ten song list, later expanded to 30 songs, which ranked the most popular songs by combining record and sheet sales, disk jockey, and jukebox performances as determined by Billboard's weekly nationwide survey. This chart amalgamated different records of the same song by different performers as one, and topping the first chart was "Ac-Cent-Tchu-Ate the Positive".

In November 1955, a composite standing chart that combined retail sales, jukebox and disk jockeys play charts but counted individual records separately was created as "The Top 100" chart, with "Love Is a Many-Splendored Thing" by The Four Aces its first number 1. This chart is the direct predecessor to the current Hot 100 chart. The jukebox chart was discontinued after the June 17, 1957, issue, the disk jockey chart after July 28, 1958, and the best-seller chart after October 13, 1958. After July 28, 1958, the composite chart the "Top 100" chart was also discontinued; and the "Hot 100" began the following week on August 4, 1958, listing "Poor Little Fool" by Ricky Nelson as its first number 1. The methodology for compiling the chart has changed over the years, currently the Hot 100 combines singles sales, radio airplay, digital downloads, and streaming activity (including data from YouTube and other video sites). Many Billboard charts use this basic formula apart from charts dedicated to the three data sources: sales (both physical and digital), airplay and streaming.

In the early period, the issue dates and the chart dates given in Billboard were different until January 13, 1962, when the issue dates and the chart dates both referred to the week ending dates. The Honor Roll of Hits chart was discontinued after November 16, 1963.

Billboard also publishes various music genre charts. "Harlem Hit Parade" was created in 1943, which became "Best-Selling Race Records" in 1948 and "Best-Selling Rhythm & Blues Records" in 1949, and then "Soul Singles" in 1969 (currently Hot R&B/Hip-Hop Songs). "Best-Selling Folk Records" was published in 1948, and this morphed into "Best-Selling Country & Western Records" in 1949, "Best-Selling C&W Records" in 1956 and "Hot Country Singles" in 1963 (now Hot Country Songs). MOR charts has been published since 1961, variously called "Easy Listening", "Middle-Road Singles" and "Pop-Standard Singles" and currently known as Adult Contemporary. Billboard charts have expanded to cover these music genres: rock, pop, country, dance, bluegrass, jazz, classical, R&B, rap, electronic, Latin, Christian, world and holiday music, as well as ringtones for mobile phones.

An album chart, the "Best Selling Popular Record Albums", was first published on March 24, 1945, with The King Cole Trio its first number 1. The first chart had ten albums, before reducing to five in the following weeks, then increasing again to ten in 1948. The album chart was split into 33-8 and 45 rpm lists in 1950, before they recombined in 1954, then divided into mono and stereo classifications in 1959, before they merged into a 150-item pop album chart in 1963. It was eventually expanded into a 200 album list on May 13, 1967. Various genre album charts were also published: Country LP chart in January 1964, R&B chart in 1965, jazz in 1969, Latin in 1973, Gospel in 1974, and Rock in 1981. Other charts include Classical albums, Comedy Albums, Holiday Albums, Soundtracks, Independent Albums, Catalog Album and many others.

At the end of each year, Billboard tallies the results of all of its charts, and the results are published in a year-end issue and heard on year-end editions of its American Top 40 and American Country Countdown radio broadcasts. The first such annual charts released were for the year 1946, published in the January 4, 1947, issue, although annual listing of songs had been published some years prior, such as the undifferentiated annual chart based on "Honor Roll of Hits" for 1945. Between 1991 and 2006, the top single/album/artist in each of those charts was/were awarded in the form of the annual Billboard Music Awards, which were held in December until the awards was discontinued in 2007. The awards returned in May 2011.

=== Chart compilation methodology ===
For many years, a song was required to be commercially available as a single to be considered for any of the Billboard charts. At the time, instead of using Luminate (formerly Nielsen SoundScan or Nielsen Broadcast Data Systems, BDS), Billboard obtained its data from manual reports filled out by radio stations and stores. For different musical genres, which stations and stores are used separates the charts; each musical genre has a core audience or retail group. Each genre's department at Billboard is decided by a chart manager, who makes these determinations. According to the 100th anniversary issue of Billboard, prior to the official implementation of SoundScan tracking in November 1991, many radio stations and retail stores removed songs from their manual reports after the associated record labels ended promotion of a particular single. Therefore, songs fell quickly after peaking and had shorter chart lives. In 1990, the country singles chart was the first chart to use SoundScan and BDS. They were followed by the Hot 100 and the R&B chart in 1991. As of 2026, all of the Billboard charts use this technology.

Before September 1995, singles were allowed to chart in the week they first went on sale based on airplay points alone. The policy was changed in September 1995, to only allow a single to debut after a full week of sales on combined sales and airplay points. This allowed several tracks to debut at number one.

In December 1998, the policy was further modified to allow tracks to chart on the basis of airplay alone without a commercial release. This change was made to reflect the changing realities of the music business. Previous to this, several substantial radio and MTV hits had not appeared on the Billboard chart at all, because many major labels chose not to release them as standalone singles, hoping their unavailability would spur greater album sales. Not offering a popular song to the public as a single was unheard of before the 1970s. The genres that suffered most at the time were those that increasingly impacted pop culture, including new genres such as trip hop and grunge. Among the many pre-1999 songs that had not appeared or charted low on the Hot 100 include The Cardigans' "Lovefool", Natalie Imbruglia's "Torn" (which peaked at number 42), Goo Goo Dolls' "Iris" (which peaked at number 9), OMC's "How Bizarre", Sugar Ray's "Fly", and No Doubt's "Don't Speak".

On June 25, 2015, Billboard made changes in its chart requirements. The official street date for all new album releases was moved from Tuesday to Friday in the United States. For all sales-based charts (ranking both albums and tracks), Billboard and Nielsen changed the chart reporting period to cover the first seven days of an album's release. As a result of the changes, The Billboard 200, top albums sales, genre-based albums, digital songs, genre-based downloads, streaming songs, and genre-focused streaming surveys ran on a Friday-to-Thursday cycle. Radio Songs, which informs the Hot 100, synced to the Monday-to-Sunday period after formerly covering Wednesday to Tuesday. All other radio charts and genre tallies followed the Monday-to-Sunday cycle. The move was made to coincide with the IFPI's move to have all singles and albums released globally on Fridays.

=== Incorporation of digital platforms ===
Starting on February 12, 2005, Billboard changed its methodology to include paid digital downloads from digital music retailers such as Rhapsody, AmazonMP3, and iTunes. With this policy change, a song could chart based on digital downloads alone.

On July 31, 2007, Billboard changed its methodology for the Hot 100 chart to include digital streams, which at the time was obtained from Yahoo and AOL's streaming platforms. This change was made exclusively to the Billboard Hot 100 chart. The effect of this chart change was minuscule at the time because it was estimated to account for five percent of the chart's total points.

In October 2012, Billboard significantly changed the methodology for its country, rock, Latin, and rap charts, when it incorporated sales of digital downloads and streaming plays into what had previously been airplay-only charts. Another change was that rather than measuring airplay only from radio stations of a particular genre, the new methodology measures airplay from all radio formats. This methodology was extended to their Christian and gospel charts in November 2013. These methodology changes resulted in higher positions on the genre charts for songs with crossover appeal to other genres and radio formats (especially pop) at the expense of songs that appeal almost exclusively to core fans of the given genre, a change that proved controversial with those devotees.

On February 20, 2013, Billboard announced another change in the methodology for its charts that incorporated YouTube video streaming data into the determination of ranking positions on streaming charts. The incorporation of YouTube streaming data enhanced a formula that includes on-demand audio streaming and online radio streaming. The YouTube video streams that used in this methodology are official video streams, Vevo on YouTube streams, and user-generated clips that use authorized audio. Billboard stated this change was made to further reflect the divergent platforms of music consumption in today's world.

=== Greatest Artists of All Time (1963–2015) ===
In 2015, Billboard compiled a ranking of the 125 best-performing artists over the 52 years of the charts, based on the combined point totals of all their Hot 100 and Billboard 200 charts. Shown below are the top ten artists on the list, through October 2015.

Rank	Artist
1	The Beatles
2	The Rolling Stones
3	Elton John
4	Mariah Carey
5	Madonna
6	Barbra Streisand
7	Michael Jackson
8	Taylor Swift
9	Stevie Wonder
10	Chicago

== Songs ==
=== All-genre ===
Chart title	Chart type	Number of positions	Description
Billboard Hot 100	Sales, airplay, streaming	100	The US music industry standard song popularity chart
Bubbling Under Hot 100	Sales, airplay, streaming	25	Ranks the top 25 songs below number 100 that have not previously appeared on the Hot 100.; Positions do not directly correspond to positions 101–125 of an extended Hot 100, but many sources use this notation
Radio Songs	Airplay (audience)	50	Measures radio airplay audience impressions on 1,233 radio stations encompassing all formats.; One of the component charts of the Hot 100; Formerly called Top 40 Radio Monitor (1986–1991) and Hot 100 Airplay (1991–2014)
Digital Song Sales	Digital sales	25	Ranks top-selling digital song sales; Combines different versions of songs for a summarized figure; One of the component charts of the Hot 100
Streaming Songs	Streaming	50	Ranks top-streaming songs; Combines different versions of songs for a summarized figure; One of the component charts of the Hot 100

=== Adult/Pop ===
Chart title	Chart type	Number of positions	Description
Pop Airplay	Airplay (spins)	40	Measures airplay detections (spins) on 157 contemporary hit radio stations. These stations also contribute to the Dance Airplay panel. Formerly known as the Mainstream Top 40.
Adult Contemporary	Airplay (spins)	30	Measures airplay spins on 85 adult contemporary stations
Adult Pop Airplay	Airplay (spins)	40	Measures airplay spins on 90 hot adult contemporary stations

=== Christian and Gospel ===
Chart title	Chart type	Number of positions	Description
Hot Christian Songs	Sales, streaming, all format airplay	50	Combines sales, airplay from all radio formats, and streaming data
Christian Streaming Songs	Streaming	25	Most streamed Christian songs
Christian Airplay	Airplay (audience)	40	Audience impressions from Christian AC, Hot AC, CHR/Pop, Soft AC, and Christian Rock stations.
Christian AC Airplay	Airplay (spins)	30	Measures airplay spins on Christian adult contemporary stations
Hot Gospel Songs	Sales, streaming, all format airplay	25	Combines sales, airplay, and streaming data of Gospel songs
Gospel Airplay	Radio (airplay)	30	Measures airplay spins of Gospel stations
Gospel Streaming Songs	Streaming	15	Top-streamed Gospel songs, ranked by sales data as compiled by Luminate.

=== Country ===
Chart title	Chart type	Number of positions	Description
Hot Country Songs	Sales, all format airplay, streaming	50	Combines sales, airplay from all radio formats and streaming data
Country Airplay	Airplay (audience)	60	Measures airplay audience impression on 128 country music stations
Country Streaming Songs	Streaming	50	Most streamed country songs.

=== Dance/Electronic ===
Chart title	Chart type	Number of positions	Description
Hot Dance/Electronic Songs	Continuous airplay, single sales, digital downloads, online streaming	50	A chart which uses the same methodology as the Hot 100, which tracks the top dance/electronic songs based on monitored airplay, single sales, digital downloads and monitored online streaming.; The songs are used to determine eligibility for entry into the Hot 100.; Criteria is based on the song's tempo.; Remixed versions of pop, rock, R&B, hip-hop or songs of other genres are ineligible for this chart.; Starting with the chart dated January 18, 2025, songs are only eligible if they are "primarily recorded by DJs or producers with an emphasis on electronic-based production".
Hot Dance/Pop Songs	Continuous airplay, single sales, digital downloads, online streaming	15	A chart which uses the same methodology as Hot Dance/Electronic Songs.; First launched with the charts dated January 18, 2025, the eligible songs have "dance-centric vocals, melody and hooks by artists not considered rooted in the dance/electronic genre".
Dance Airplay	Continuous airplay (Spins from exclusive reporters)	40	Originally called Hot Dance Radio Airplay when it was launched in 2003. A monitored dance music radio chart of six dance stations that came about as a result of the small but influential impact of dance music on the radio and the stations that program it.; Renamed Dance/Mix Show Airplay on November 19, 2011. The chart includes the 157 Mainstream Top 40 and 67 Rhythmic Top 40 reporters that features mix shows in their programming.; Expanded to 40 positions, effective with the December 6, 2014 issue.; On July 4, 2026, renamed back to Dance Airplay and returned to its original methodology without mix show programming.
WARM Global Dance Radio	Airplay (audience)	40	A weekly international music chart and syndicated radio countdown that ranks the most-played electronic dance music tracks on specialized radio stations worldwide.
Dance Streaming Songs	Streaming	25	A chart that tracks the week's top Dance/Electronic streamed radio songs and on-demand songs and videos on leading online music services.

=== Holiday ===
Chart title	Chart type	Number of positions	Description
Holiday 100	Airplay, sales, and streaming	100	Combines airplay, sales and streaming data.; Annual survey runs for 5–6 weeks beginning early December.
Holiday Airplay	Airplay (audience)	50	Holiday Song chart from 2001 until 2010.; Annual survey of audience impressions from all radio stations.; Annual survey runs for 5–6 weeks beginning early December.
Holiday Streaming Songs	Streaming	50	Annual survey of most streamed Holiday songs.; Annual survey runs for 5–6 weeks beginning early December.

=== Internet charts ===
Chart title	Number of positions	Description
Social 50	50	A ranking of the most active artists on the world's leading social networking sites. Artists' popularity is determined by a formula blending their weekly additions from the public along with artist page views and weekly song plays, as measured by Next Big Sound.
LyricFind Global	25	Most-searched songs on LyricFind.
LyricFind U.S.	25	Most-searched songs on LyricFind.
Top Gabb Music Songs	25	Most-played songs streamed through Gabb Music by Gabb Wireless, which features songs appropriate for young people, first presented November 2024, and updated monthly. Gabb Music streams are not included on any other Billboard chart.

=== Jazz ===
Chart title	Chart type	Number of positions	Description
Smooth Jazz Airplay	Airplay (spins)	30	Measures airplay spins on 14 smooth jazz stations

=== Latin ===
Chart title	Chart type	Number of positions	Description
Hot Latin Songs	Sales, airplay, streaming	50	Ranks the top fifty Spanish-language singles in the American music market. It was established as an airplay-only chart by Billboard in 1986. As of October 11, 2012, the chart is based on airplay across all formats, digital downloads, and streaming of Latin songs. Only predominately Spanish-language songs are eligible to rank on the chart.
Hot Latin Pop Songs	Sales, airplay, streaming	25	Ranks the top twenty-five Spanish-language pop songs in the American music market. Launched on the issue dated April 12, 2025, the chart is based on airplay, digital downloads, and streaming of Latin pop songs.
Hot Latin Rhythm Songs	Sales, airplay, streaming	25	Ranks the top twenty-five Latin rhythm songs in the American music market. Launched on the issue dated April 12, 2025, the chart is based on airplay, digital downloads, and streaming of Latin rhythm songs.
Hot Regional Mexican Songs	Sales, airplay, streaming	25	Ranks the top twenty-five regional Mexican songs in the American music market. Launched on the issue dated April 12, 2025, the chart is based on airplay, digital downloads, and streaming of regional Mexican songs.
Hot Tropical Songs	Sales, airplay, streaming	25	Ranks the top twenty-five Spanish-language tropical music songs in the American music market. Launched on the issue dated April 12, 2025, the chart is based on airplay, digital downloads, and streaming of Latin tropical songs.
Latin Airplay	Airplay (spins)	50	Ranks the most played songs on Latin radio stations in the United States and Puerto Rico regardless of genre or language.
Latin Pop Airplay	Airplay (audience)	25	Ranks the most-listened to Spanish-language pop songs on Latin music radio stations. It was established in 1994, initially measuring airplay of songs being played on Latin pop radio stations.
Regional Mexican Airplay	Airplay (spins)	40	Ranks the most performed song on Regional Mexican radio stations in the United States. It includes musical styles originating from Mexico as well as the Mexican-American community in the US such as Tejano. This chart is based on airplay from 65 regional Mexican radio stations compiled using information tracked by BDS. It was established in 1994.
Tropical Airplay	Airplay (audience)	25	Ranks the most-listened to Spanish-language tropical music songs on 140 Latin music radio stations. It was established by the magazine in 1994, initially measuring airplay of songs played by a small panel of tropical music radio stations.
Latin Rhythm Airplay	Airplay (audience)	25	Ranks the most-listened to Spanish-language Latin rhythm songs. Latin rhythm is a music radio format that includes Spanish-language urban genres such as Latin hip hop and reggaeton. Established in 2005, it initially measured airplay of songs being played on 15 Latin rhythm radio stations.
Latin Streaming Songs	Streaming	25	Ranks play of Spanish-language streamed radio songs and on-demand songs and music videos on leading online music services.

=== R&B/Hip-Hop ===
Chart title	Chart type	Number of positions	Description
Hot R&B/Hip-Hop Songs	Airplay, sales, streaming	50 (Note: 100 positions prior to October 2012.)	Ranks the most popular by combining airplay from all formats of radio stations, digital download sales, streaming data and YouTube views of R&B and hip-hop songs.
R&B/Hip-Hop Airplay	Airplay (audience)	50	Measures airplay based on audience impressions from various R&B/hip-hop stations. Component of Hot R&B/Hip-Hop Songs chart.
R&B/Hip-Hop Streaming Songs	Streaming		Top-streamed R&B and hip-hop songs, ranked by sales data as compiled by Nielsen SoundScan. Component of Hot R&B/Hip-Hop Songs chart.
Mainstream R&B/Hip-Hop Airplay	Airplay (spins)	40	Ranks songs by combining airplay base on radio plays (spins) from 76 R&B/hip-hop stations. Component of R&B/Hip-Hop Airplay chart.
Adult R&B Airplay	Airplay (spins)	30	Measures airplay from 65 Urban AC radio stations. Component of R&B/Hip-Hop Airplay chart.
Rhythmic Airplay	Airplay (spins)	40	Measures airplay spins on 72 rhythmic stations. Rhythmic is a music radio format that includes of a mix of dance, upbeat rhythmic pop, hip hop and R&B hits. These stations also contribute to the Dance Airplay panel.
Hot Rap Songs	Airplay, sales, streaming	25	Ranks the top 25 hip-hop/rap songs by combining airplay from all formats of radio stations, digital download sales, streaming data and YouTube views of rap songs.
Rap Airplay	Airplay (spins)	25	Ranks the top 25 hip-hop/rap songs by airplay spins from R&B/hip-hop and rhythmic radio stations. Component of Hot Rap Songs chart.
Rap Streaming Songs	Streaming		Top-streamed rap songs, ranked by sales data as compiled by Nielsen SoundScan. Component of Hot Rap Songs chart.
Hot R&B/Hip-Hop Recurrents	Airplay (spins)	20	Ranks songs that have fallen below number 50 on Hot R&B/Hip-Hop Songs and have been on that chart for over 20 weeks.
Hot R&B/Hip-Hop Recurrent Airplay	Airplay (spins)	20	Ranks the songs that have fallen below number 25 on the Hot R&B/Hip-Hop Airplay chart and have been on that chart for over 20 weeks.
Hot R&B Songs	Airplay, sales, streaming	25	Ranks the top 25 R&B songs by combining airplay from all formats of radio stations, digital download sales, streaming data and YouTube views of R&B songs.
R&B Streaming Songs	Streaming	15	Top-streamed R&B songs, ranked by sales data as compiled by Nielsen SoundScan. Component of Hot R&B Songs chart.

=== Rock/Alternative ===
Chart title	Chart type	Number of positions	Description
Hot Rock & Alternative Songs	Sales, airplay, streaming	50	Ranks the top rock and alternative songs across all formats, based on radio airplay, sales data, and streaming activity
Rock & Alternative Airplay	Airplay (audience)	50	Airplay audience impressions on mainstream rock, alternative, and Triple A radio stations
Hot Rock Songs	Sales, airplay, and streaming	25	Ranks the top rock songs based on radio airplay across all formats, sales data, and streaming activity; debuted with the chart week dated July 2, 2022.
Rock Streaming Songs	Streaming	25	Top-streamed rock songs, ranked by sales data as compiled by Luminate.
Hot Alternative Songs	Sales, airplay, streaming	25	Ranks the top alternative songs based on radio airplay across all formats, sales data, and streaming activity
Alternative Airplay	Airplay (spins)	40	Measures airplay spins on 50 alternative/modern rock stations
Alternative Streaming Songs	Streaming	25	Top-streamed songs classified as alternative, ranked by sales data as compiled by Luminate.
Mainstream Rock Airplay	Airplay (spins)	40	Measures airplay spins on 77 mainstream rock radio stations encompassing active rock and heritage rock
Adult Alternative Airplay	Airplay (spins)	40	Measures airplay spins on 24 adult album alternative radio stations
Hot Hard Rock Songs	Sales, airplay, streaming	25	Ranks the top hard rock songs based on radio airplay across all formats, sales data, and streaming activity
Hard Rock Streaming Songs	Streaming	25	Top-streamed songs classified as hard rock, ranked by sales data as compiled by Luminate.

=== World music ===
Chart title	Chart type	Number of positions	Description
Billboard U.S. Afrobeats Songs	Streaming		Top US-streamed Afrobeats songs, ranked by sales data as compiled by Nielsen SoundScan.

=== International charts ===
==== Canadian charts ====
Chart title	Chart type	Number of positions	Description
Canadian Hot 100	Airplay, sales, streaming	100	Canadian music industry standard singles popularity chart
Canadian Albums	Sales and streaming	100	
Emerging Canadian Artist	Airplay, sales, streaming	30	Ranks most popular songs by emerging Canadian artists; Artists are considered emerging until 12 months after the date their first Canadian Hot 100 charting entry reaches the top 40.; No recurrent chart
Hot 100 Airplay	Airplay (audience)	75	Measures radio airplay audience impressions on 137 radio stations from five different formats; One of the component charts of Canadian Hot 100
All-format Airplay	Airplay (spins)	50	Measures radio airplay spins on 137 radio stations from five formats.; A 100-position chart was previously available at Jam! Canoe website.
CHR/Top 40 Airplay	Airplay (spins)	50	Measures radio airplay spins on 25 CHR radio stations
AC Airplay	Airplay (spins)	50	Measures radio airplay spins on 28 AC radio stations
Hot AC Airplay	Airplay (spins)	50	Measures radio airplay spins on 24 Hot AC radio stations
Country Airplay	Airplay (spins)	50	Measures radio airplay spins on 31 country radio stations
Rock Airplay	Airplay (spins)	50	Measures radio airplay spins on 29 rock radio stations

==== Other international charts ====
Chart title	Description
Arabic Hot 100	Ranks the top 100 singles based on streaming.
Argentina Hot 100	Ranks the top 100 singles in Argentina based on airplay, digital downloads, and streaming.
Billboard Global 200	Ranks the top songs based on sales and streaming data from more than 200 territories worldwide.
Billboard Global Excl. U.S.	Ranks the top songs based on sales and streaming data from territories outside the United States.
Billboard Korea Global K-Songs	Ranks the top songs by Korean artists based on sales and streaming data from more than 200 territories worldwide.
Brasil Hot 100	Ranks the top 100 singles in Brazil based on streaming.
China TME UNI Chart	Ranks the top 100 singles in China by China, Hong Kong and Taiwan artists based on digital downloads and streaming. Collaborates with Tencent Music Entertainment.
Colombia Hot 100	Ranks the top 100 singles in Colombia based on airplay, digital downloads, and streaming.
Hits of the World	Ranks the top 25 songs in more than 40 countries.
Japan Hot 100	Ranks the best-selling singles and tracks in Japan.
Korea Hot 100	Ranks the best-selling singles and tracks in South Korea.
Luxembourg Songs	Ranks the best-selling singles and tracks in Luxembourg.
Mexican Airplay	Ranks the most listened singles in Mexico.
Mexico Español Airplay	Ranks the most listened singles in Spanish-language in Mexico.
Mexico Ingles Airplay	Ranks the most listened singles in English-language in Mexico.
Philippines Hot 100	Ranks the top 100 singles in the Philippines based on digital downloads and streaming.
Top Philippines Songs	Ranks the top 100 singles in the Philippines by Filipino artists based on digital downloads and streaming.
Top Thai Songs	Ranks the top 100 Thai songs in Thailand based on digital downloads and streaming.
Top Thai Country Songs	Ranks the top 50 luk thung songs in Thailand based on digital downloads and streaming.
Vietnam Hot 100	Ranks the top 100 singles in Vietnam based on digital downloads and streaming.
Vietnam Top Vietnamese Songs	Ranks the top 100 singles in Vietnam by Vietnamese artists based on digital downloads and streaming.

== Albums ==
Chart title	Number of chart positions	Description
Billboard 200	200	Industry standard, includes albums from any genre.; Includes both new and catalog albums.; Includes data from on-demand streaming services
Top Album Sales	50	A pure album sales chart.
Top Alternative Albums	25	Ranks the most popular alternative albums of the week, as compiled by Nielsen Music.; Based on multi-metric consumption (blending traditional album sales, track equivalent albums, and streaming equivalent albums)
Top Bluegrass Albums	15	
Top Blues Albums	15	
Cast Albums		Measuring sales of cast recordings
Top Christian Albums	50	
Top Classical Albums	50	
Classical Crossover Albums	15	
Top Comedy Albums	10	
Compilation Albums	20	
Contemporary Jazz Albums	15	Debuted on February 28, 1987, with 25 positions.
Top Country Albums	50	
Top Dance Albums	25	Known as Top Dance/Electronic Albums until the week dated January 11, 2025.
Top Gospel Albums	40	
Top Hard Rock Albums	25	Ranks the most popular hard rock albums of the week, as compiled by Nielsen Music.; Based on multi-metric consumption (blending traditional album sales, track equivalent albums, and streaming equivalent albums)
Top Holiday Albums	50	Combined with single sales, debuted November 30, 1963 as Christmas Records. Name changed to Best Bets For Christmas in 1966. No charts published between 1974 and 1982. Resumed December 17, 1983 as Christmas Hits.; The album only chart renamed Top Christmas Albums in 1990, then Top Holiday Albums in 2000.; Surveys run for 12–15 weeks each holiday season beginning in October.
Independent Albums	50	Ranks top 50 albums released through independent record labels.
Jazz Albums	25	Also titled "Best Selling Jazz LP's".
Top Latin Albums	50	Ranks the best-selling Latin albums weekly. An album must have at least 51% of its content recorded in Spanish to rank on this chart.
Top R&B/Hip-Hop Albums	50	
Rap Albums	25	
Top Rock Albums	50	Ranks the most popular rock albums of the week, as compiled by Nielsen Music.; Based on multi-metric consumption (blending traditional album sales, track equivalent albums, and streaming equivalent albums)
Top Rock & Alternative Albums	50	Ranks the most popular rock and alternative albums of the week, as compiled by Nielsen Music.; Based on multi-metric consumption (blending traditional album sales, track equivalent albums, and streaming equivalent albums)
Top Soundtracks	30	
Americana/Folk Albums	25	
Kid Albums	15	
Latin Rhythm Albums	25	
Latin Pop Albums	20	
New Age Albums	10	
R&B Albums	25	Ranks top R&B albums by sales as compiled by Nielsen Music. Albums must be less than 18 months old, or if older than 18 months then they must reside on the Billboard 200's top 100.
Reggae Albums	10	
Indie Store Album Sales		Ranked albums based on "an influential panel of indie stores and small regional chains."
Traditional Classical Albums		
Traditional Jazz Albums	15	
Tropical Albums	20	
Vinyl Albums	25	
World Albums	25	Debuted on May 19, 1990.; Ranks biggest-selling world music albums, including catalog titles.; Initially featured 15 positions, but was extended to 25 starting from the week of January 18, 2025.
Regional Mexican Albums	20	

== Discontinued charts ==
Chart title	Discontinuation date	Chart type	Number of positions	Description
Active Rock	November 25, 2013	Sales and airplay		Assimilated into the Mainstream Rock Airplay chart.
Best Sellers in Stores	October 13, 1958	Physical sales		Ranked records in order of national selling importance at the retail level. Three charts: Popular Records, Rhythm & Blues Records, Country & Western Records
Bubbling Under R&B/Hip-Hop Songs	2012	Sales, airplay, streaming	15	Ranked the top 15 songs below number 50 that have not previously appeared on the Hot R&B/Hip-Hop Songs chart.
Catalog Albums	January 2026		50	Ranked the best-selling catalog albums in the United States across all genres.
Christian Digital Song Sales	June 4, 2026	Digital sales	15	Top-downloaded Christian songs, ranked by sales data as compiled by Luminate.
Classical Budget/Midline Albums		Physical sales		
Comprehensive Music Video	2012	Physical sales		Ranked the best-selling music DVDs, including those not in full retail distribution.
Country Catalog Albums	January 2026	Physical sales		
Country Singles Sales	2005	Physical sales		Ranked the best-selling commercial country singles.
Country Digital Song Sales	June 27, 2026	Digital sales	50	Most-downloaded country songs, ranked by sales data as compiled by Luminate. First launched with the charts dated January 23, 2010.
China Top 100	2019	Sales, airplay, streaming	100	Ranked the best-selling local singles in China.
Dance Digital Song Sales	June 27, 2026	Digital sales	50	Tracked digital sales of dance/electronic music singles, including tracks exclusively available online only. This chart also included previously released dance and disco songs that became available for downloading.
Dance Singles Sales	November 30, 2013	Physical sales	10	Dual chart combined with the Dance Club Songs from 1985 until 2013. Devoted exclusively to 12-inch maxi single sales.
Dance/Electronic Album Sales		Physical sales		Similar to Dance/Electronic Albums, but more focused on core Dance/Electronic artists.
European Hot 100 Singles	December 11, 2010	Sales, airplay, streaming	100	Ranked the best-selling singles in Europe by combining sales from various countries in Europe.
Global Dance Tracks	June 29, 2013	Physical sales		A weekly international survey of the songs that were popular in dance clubs globally.
Gospel Digital Song Sales	June 27, 2026	Digital sales	25	Top-downloaded Gospel songs, ranked by sales data as compiled by Luminate.
Heatseekers Songs	December 6, 2014	Sales, airplay, streaming	25	Ranked songs from new and developing acts that had never attained the top 50 of the Hot 100. If a song reached the top 50, it and any of the artist's subsequent singles became ineligible for the chart.
Heatseekers Albums	January 2025	Sales, airplay, streaming	25	Ranked albums from new and developing acts that had never attained the top 100 of the Billboard 200. If an album reached the top 100, it and any of the artist's subsequent albums become ineligible for the chart.
Heritage Rock	November 25, 2013	Sales and airplay		Assimilated into the Mainstream Rock Airplay chart.
Hot Crossover 30	December 8, 1990	Airplay (spins)	30	Ranked the best-performing songs on rhythmic contemporary radio stations.
Holiday Digital Song Sales	June 27, 2026	Digital downloads	25	Annual survey of Top-downloaded Holiday songs, ranked by sales data as compiled by Luminate.
Hot Digital Tracks		Digital sales	75	Ranked digital song sales with different versions of songs listed. No recurrent chart
Hot Ringtones		Ringtone sale	40	Ranked weekly sales of polyphonic ringtones for mobile phones, launched in 2004
Hot RingMasters	December 6, 2014	Ringtone sale	40	Ranked weekly sales of master ringtones for mobile phones.
R&B/Hip-Hop Digital Song Sales	June 27, 2026	Digital sales		Top-downloaded R&B and hip-hop songs, ranked by sales data as compiled by Nielsen SoundScan. Component of Hot R&B/Hip-Hop Songs chart.
Rap Digital Song Sales	June 27, 2026	Digital sales		Top-downloaded rap songs, ranked by sales data as compiled by Nielsen SoundScan. Component of Hot Rap Songs chart.
R&B Digital Song Sales	June 27, 2026	Digital sales		Top-downloaded R&B songs, ranked by sales data as compiled by Nielsen SoundScan. Component of Hot R&B Songs chart.
Hot Singles Sales	November 21, 2017	Physical sales	15	Measured sales of commercial physical singles. One of the component charts of the Hot 100. No recurrent chart.
Hot Videoclips	2010		25	Ranked top 25 most popular music videos according to digital sales and television play on shows such as TRL and 106 & Park
Honor Roll of Hits	November 16, 1963			Comprised the nation's top tunes according to record sales and disk jockey performances as determined by Billboard's weekly nationwide survey.
Indonesia Top 100	2020	Sales, airplay, streaming	100	Ranked the top 100 singles in Indonesia based on digital downloads, airplay, streaming, and karaoke play.
K-Pop 100	April 2022	Sales, airplay, streaming	100	Ranked the best-selling singles by Korean artists in South Korea. Replaced by Hits of the World chart South Korea Songs.
Latin Digital Song Sales	June 27, 2026	Digital sales	50	Ranked the best-selling Spanish-language from digital music retailers as compiled by Nielsen SoundScan.
Most Played by Jockeys	July 28, 1958			Ranked records in order of the greatest number of plays on disk jockey radio shows throughout the country. Three charts: Popular Records, Rhythm & Blues Records, Country & Western Records
Most Played in Juke Boxes	June 17, 1957			Ranked records in order of the greatest number of plays nationally in juke boxes. Three charts: Popular Records, Rhythm & Blues Records, Country & Western Records
Pop 100	June 13, 2009	Sales, airplay	100	Ranked songs by combining airplay focused on pop radio and sales. The chart's importance is replaced by the Mainstream Top 40 chart
Pop 100 Airplay	June 13, 2009	Airplay (audience)	100	Measured airplay on pop music radio. One of three component charts of the Pop 100.
R&B/Hip-Hop Catalog Albums	January 2026	Physical sales		
Top 40 Tracks	March 2005	Airplay (audience)	40	Debuted in December 1998 ranking songs by audience impressions on Mainstream, Adult, and Rhythmic Top 40 radio stations. Discontinued with the introduction of the Pop 100 and Pop 100 Airplay charts.
Blues Digital Song Sales	January 2020	Digital sales		Top-downloaded blues songs, ranked by sales data as compiled by Nielsen SoundScan.
Classical Digital Song Sales	January 2020	Digital sales		Top-downloaded classical songs, ranked by sales data as compiled by Nielsen SoundScan.
Comedy Digital Track Sales	January 2020	Digital sales		Top-downloaded comedy songs, ranked by sales data as compiled by Nielsen SoundScan.
Euro Digital Song Sales	February 12, 2022	Digital sales		Ranked the best-selling digital singles and tracks in Europe.
Euro Digital Tracks	November 29, 2014	Digital sales		Ranked the best-selling digital tracks in Europe.
Luxembourg Digital Song Sales	2020	Digital sales		Ranked the most downloaded songs digitally in the country of Luxembourg for the week.
Jazz Digital Song Sales	January 2020	Digital sales		Top-downloaded jazz songs, ranked by sales data as compiled by Nielsen SoundScan.
Kid Digital Song Sales	January 2020	Digital sales		Top-downloaded children's songs, ranked by sales data as compiled by Nielsen SoundScan.
New Age Digital Song Sales	January 2020	Digital sales		Top-downloaded new age songs, ranked by sales data as compiled by Nielsen SoundScan.
Pop Digital Song Sales	January 2020	Digital sales	50	Top-downloaded pop songs, ranked by sales data as compiled by Nielsen SoundScan.
Reggae Digital Song Sales	January 2020	Digital sales		Top-downloaded reggae songs, ranked by sales data as compiled by Nielsen SoundScan.
Spotify Rewind		Streaming	30	Ranked top-streaming old/classic songs on Spotify.
Spotify Velocity		Streaming	30	Ranked top-streaming songs on Spotify.
France Digital Song Sales	February 2022	Digital sales	10	Ranked the best-selling digital singles and tracks in France. Replaced by Hits of the World chart collection component France Songs.
Spain Digital Song Sales	February 2022	Digital sales	10	Ranked the best-selling digital singles and tracks in Spain. Replaced by Hits of the World chart collection component Spain Songs.
Switzerland Digital Song Sales	February 2022	Digital sales	10	Ranked the best-selling digital singles and tracks in Switzerland. Replaced by Hits of the World chart collection component Switzerland Songs.
Rock Digital Song Sales	June 27, 2026	Digital sales	50	Top-downloaded rock songs, ranked by sales data as compiled by Luminate.
Alternative Digital Song Sales	June 27, 2026	Digital sales	25	Top-downloaded songs classified as alternative (or a combination of alternative and another genre), ranked by sales data as compiled by Luminate debuted with the chart week dated January 22, 2011.
Hard Rock Digital Song Sales	June 27, 2026	Digital sales	25	Top-downloaded songs classified as hard rock, ranked by sales data as compiled by Luminate.
Viral 50		Streaming	50	Ranked top-streaming independent songs on Spotify.
Digital Albums	2019	Digital sales		
TikTok Billboard Top 50	March 7, 2025		50	Most popular songs on TikTok in the United States, based on a combination of creations, video views and user engagement.
Top Current Album Sales	June 27, 2026		50	The same chart as Top Album Sales, with catalog titles removed.
Top Internet Albums	January 2020			Ranked physical albums ordered through Internet merchants.
Christian AC Indicator	2022	Airplay (spins)	30	
Christian Hot AC/CHR	2022	Airplay (spins)	30	Measured airplay spins on Christian CHR stations.
Christian Rock	2019	Airplay (spins)	30	Measured airplay spins on Christian rock stations.
Christian Soft AC	2018	Airplay (spins)	20	Measured airplay spins on Christian Soft AC stations.
World Digital Song Sales	June 27, 2026	Digital sales	10	Ranked the best-selling world music/foreign-language digital singles in the United States.
Music Video Sales		Physical sales	100	Industry standard, includes video albums from any genre.
Dance Club Songs	March 28, 2020	Reports from DJs	50	Compiled exclusively from playlists submitted by nightclub disc jockeys, who applied and met certain criteria to become Billboard-reporting DJs.

== Other charts ==
In December 2010, Billboard announced a new chart titled Social 50, which ranks the most active artists on the world's leading social networking sites. The Social 50 chart tallies artists' popularity using their weekly additions from the public, along with weekly artist page views and weekly song plays on Myspace, YouTube, Facebook, Twitter and iLike. In January 2011, Billboard introduced another chart called Uncharted, which listed new and developing artists, who had not appeared on any major Billboard chart, "regardless of their country of origin."

In May 2014, after the Korea K-Pop Hot 100 chart was discontinued in the U.S., the Billboard K-Town column continued to provide chart information for K-pop artists on all Billboard charts. The Artist 100 debuted in July 2014. In June 2019, Billboard launched the Top Songwriters Chart and the Top Producers Chart, based on weekly activity on the Hot 100 and other "Hot" genre charts. Dance/Pop Songwriters and Dance/Pop Producers charts are scheduled to be launched in January 2025, based on the Hot Dance/Pop Songs chart. In October 2021, Billboard launched the Hot Trending Songs charts, utilising real-time music-related trends and conversations on Twitter.

== See also ==
- Official Singles Chart
- List of record charts
