= Submit It! =

- Type: Internet advertising service
- Inventor: Scott Banister
- Inception: 1995
- Manufacturer: Submit It!
- Available: No
- Website: submit-it.com

Submit It! was a search-business internet advertising product that Scott Banister created in 1995, while he was a student at the University of Illinois Urbana-Champaign. Co-founded by Bill Younker and Larry Gormley, it was acquired by LinkExchange in June 1998.

== Description ==
The New York Times reported, "Scott Banister started Submit It, a free, automated resource for bringing your page to the attention of many Web-searching outfits at once."

In 1996, Business Wire said, "Submit It!, Inc. is a privately held company headquartered in Bedford, Mass. The company's services today are used by Web site developers and marketers throughout the world who are responsible for promoting Web sites on the Internet. Submit It!'s mission is to develop and market services and products that allow anyone to easily submit and send information on the Internet."

According to Ali Partovi, Banister created a search-business model, "a simple but elegant concept that turned out to be one of the best business ideas in history". Partovi wrote that Banister created Submit It! as a service that

...helped website owners submit their URLs to multiple search engines and directories. Banister saw how badly his customers wanted to secure placement on search results. In 1996, he brilliantly conceived an idea he called Keywords: to sell search listings based on pay-for-placement bidding – more or less the same as today's AdWords. Banister began pitching the idea to anybody who would listen to him, including, among others, Bill Gross of IdeaLab, and the principals of LinkExchange: Tony Hsieh, Sanjay Madan, and me.

— Ali Partovi

== History ==
Banister was still a student at UIUC in 1995 when he created ListServe. Eventually he and his friends added a bot tool to manage lists, and they renamed the company SubmitIt/Listbot, the precursor of Submit It!

In 1996, LinkExchange became partners with Submit It! Business Wire described the resulting partnership as "the world's most popular service for registering web sites with search engines and directories. The two companies will join forces to provide web site owners with the most powerful, simple and effective solutions to promote their sites online." In 1998, LinkExchange announced acquisition of Submit It! and its developers.

Microsoft subsequently acquired LinkExchange, including integration of its employees, in December 1998. According to Partovi, none of the former LinkExchange employees "...received a meaningful role at Microsoft. Not one stayed at Microsoft more than a few months." According to UIUC's Department of Computer Science, Alumni News, "Both Submit It and ListBot and another Web service that Banister created called ClickTrade live on as part of MSN LinkExchange."

== See also ==
- Search engine marketing
