= Pediped Footwear =

Children's footwear company

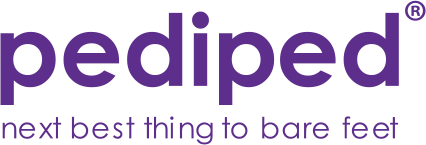
- Industry: Apparel
- Founded: 2004
- Headquarters: Henderson, Nevada, U.S.
- Products: Footwear
- Website: www.pediped.com

Pediped is a marketer of soft-sole children's footwear.

== History ==
Pediped was founded in Henderson, Nevada in 2004 by husband-and-wife business partners, Angela and Brian Edgeworth after the birth of their first child.

In 2008, the firm hired Rudy Glocker, a former vice president at Goldman Sachs, as its chief operating officer (COO).

== Retail and distribution ==
Pediped's first retail store, located in Las Vegas, Nevada, opened its doors in 2013. Additional retail stores are located in Shanghai and Beijing. The company sells its products to over 2,000 stores in the United States, has distribution in over 41 countries and employs 270 staff members worldwide. Pediped also distributes its product on online retailers Amazon.com and Zappos.

The company's main manufacturing and distribution factory is located in Suzhou, China, with an additional 35,000 square-foot facility located in Henderson, Nevada.
