= Amy Martin =

Amy Martin may refer to:

- Amy Jo Martin (born 1969), American microblogger
- Amy Martin (rower) (born 1974), American rower
