= Firouz Partovi =

Iranian physicist

- Born: 1936 (age 89–90); Tabriz, Iran
- Citizenship: Iran, United States
- Education: Alborz High School, Rensselaer Polytechnic Institute, Massachusetts Institute of Technology
- Children: Ali Partovi; Hadi Partovi
- Awards: Michael S. Feld Biophotonics Award
- Scientific career
- Fields: physicist, Professor

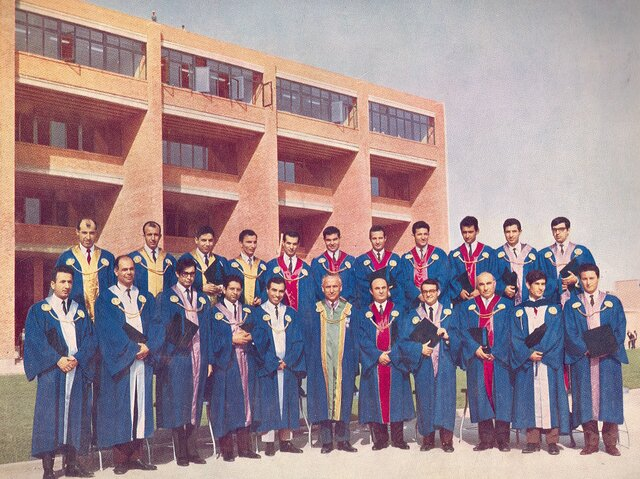

Firouz Partovi (also written as Firooz Partovi, Persian: فیروز پرتوی) was born in 1936 in Tabriz, East Azerbaijan. He is an Iranian-American physicist and university professor. Partovi received his PhD from the Massachusetts Institute of Technology in 1963, majoring in physics. He founded the faculty of physics at Sharif University of Technology and he is the second professor employed by the university, after Mohammad Ali Mojtahedi in Sharif University. Ali Partovi and Hadi Partovi are the sons of Firouz Partovi. He taught at Sharif University of Technology, Amirkabir University of Technology, Massachusetts Institute of Technology and Harvard University.

Partovi was an employee at Sharif University. He was a physics professor at Polytechnique University when he was approached by Dr. Mojtahedi about the establishment of the then Aryamher University. Together they managed to recruit the first generation of the staff and faculty for the university. Partovi founded the physics department and was its professor from 1965 to 1985, as well as its chairman for a number of years. Moreover, he designed the program to computerize the student registration and record keeping.

Partovi is a graduate of MIT and in addition to Sharif University, has worked at MIT, Harvard, Tehran Polytechnique, and Mazandaran University (where he was one of the founders), in areas covering nuclear physics, laser surgery, voice recognition, and computer science as applied to financial markets. it is said that Partovi is highly respected among his peers and former students.

Partovi currently lives in Seattle. In 2018, he won the Dr. Amin Lifetime Achievement Award from Sharif University of Technology Association (SUTA).
