= ListBot =

Former Email List Hosting Service

ListBot was a large email list hosting service originally created by Submit It! Inc., a privately held company based in Bedford, Massachusetts. In June 1998, ListBot became part of LinkExchange, which acquired Submit It! Inc. In November 1998, ListBot became a Microsoft property via the acquisition of LinkExchange.

As of January 2000, ListBot was used by over a half million individuals and businesses, sending email to more than 20 million subscribers. In August 2001, Microsoft shuttered the site in favor of the Redmond-developed ListBuilder.
