= TekTrak =

Security and tracking app

- Developer(s): TekTrak, Inc.
- Type: "Utility"

TekTrak is a mobile application created by TekTrak, Inc. for the Apple iOS and Android operating systems. It enables the user to remotely track their smartphone and secure any information stored on the device, if it gets lost or misplaced. Currently, the application can be downloaded as a free, 'lite' version, or a paid, 'pro' version from Apple's App Store and the Android Market.

== Features ==
TekTrak allows users to locate a phone, track its previous locations and remotely ring the handset from any web browser. To use the application, one needs to download the application from the iTunes Store and register a login to use on the TekTrak website. The application can track a phone from any web browser through the TekTrak website as the location is checked at predetermined time intervals. From the web browser, the continuous tracking function can be activated so a phone may be tracked in real time, instead of the pre-set check-in intervals. TekTrak utilizes the Assisted GPS hardware located within smartphones to display the location of the device on a map. With adjustable interval checking, TekTrak may access the full location history of the phone.

During the 2011 Tōhoku earthquake and tsunami, the application's location history feature allowed a Japanese family to track the location of their daughter, and follow her progress from her school to her home during the disaster.

== History ==
TekTrak was founded by Arik Waldman, Luka Sklizovic, and Dan Russ during the summer of 2009 as part of their master's thesis at the UCLA Anderson School of Management. TekTrak was one of the recipients of the Wolfen Award at UCLA Anderson, giving the team the initial capital to start developing a prototype. The company was first incorporated as an LLC during March 2010, and was subsequently incorporated as a Delaware C corporation in November 2010. During 2010 the company raised angel funding from a series of investors, including Scott Banister, Wasabi Ventures, Barney Pell, Kima Ventures, Dovi Frances and Sergey Grishin. The initial application developed by TekTrak was for the iPhone, and two versions, one free and one paid, were released in 2010 and 2011.

In June 2012, TekTrak formally shut down, citing no particular reasons.
