= Delivering Happiness =

2010 book by Tony Hsieh

Delivering Happiness: A Path to Profits, Passion, and Purpose
- Author: Tony Hsieh
- Language: English
- Genre: Business, non-fiction
- Publication date: 2010 (USA)
- Publication place: United States
- Media type: Print (hardback and paperback)
- Pages: 277 p. (US hardcover edition)

Delivering Happiness: A Path to Profits, Passion, and Purpose (2010) is a book by Zappos CEO Tony Hsieh. It details his life as an entrepreneur, with emphasis on the founding of LinkExchange and Zappos.

== Background ==
In 2009, Hsieh began writing Delivering Happiness over Labor Day in Lake Tahoe. He wrote most of the book stream of consciousness, often completing 3,000-word chunks a day that he would send to his editor in New York City. While writing the book, Hsieh was still acting CEO of Zappos as well as a corporate speaker. Due to this gruelling schedule, he would often write for 20 to 24 hours at a time, sleep for four hours or less, and then resume working. To stay awake, Hsieh says that "we tried coffee. And alcohol. And then coffee and alcohol. We actually put coffee beans in a vodka bottle." The entire writing process took two and a half weeks.

== Synopsis ==
The book is divided into three sections: Profits; Profits and Passion; and Profits, Passion, and Purpose. It is written in narrative form and includes short 1–2 page entries from Hsieh's friends and employees. In the first section, Hsieh details his entrepreneurial adventures from when he was young until he was in college. These include his attempt to start an earthworm breeding business at the age of 9, a mail order button business in middle school, and a grille at Harvard University. After college, Hsieh founded LinkExchange, which he sold to Microsoft for $265 million two years later. He founded Venture Frogs, an investment fund, of which Zappos was one of the investments.

The second section, Profits and Passion, details Hsieh's involvement with Zappos, beginning with joining the company full-time as CEO in 2000. The third section, Profits, Passion, and Purpose, covers Zappos sale to Amazon, as well as lessons Hsieh learned in public relations and public speaking.

== Release and reception ==
Before the release of Delivering Happiness, Hsieh gave away free copies of the book to bloggers in exchange for a review and the ability to give away a free book. Hsieh and his team also partnered with Livestrong, with the goal of raising $33,333 for cancer research. For a $33 donation to the fund, entries got a copy of the book as well as a chance to win a trip to New York City.

Delivering Happiness was profiled in The Washington Post, CNBC, TechCrunch, The Huffington Post, and The Wall Street Journal It debuted at No. 1 on the New York Times Best Seller List, and stayed on the list for 27 consecutive weeks. It also spent nine weeks in the USA Today Besteller list, where it peaked at 9, and was one of the Top 10 Amazon Bestsellers for June and July. At least part of the commercial success of Delivering Happiness can be attributed to ResultSource, who undertake best-seller campaigns on behalf of authors, meaning they purchase books in bulk to game The New York Times bestseller list and others. Hsieh is quoted on ResultSource's homepage as stating that ResultSource was "a key to the success of my book".
