= LinkExchange =

Internet advertising cooperative

The LinkExchange logo, circa 1998

LinkExchange was a popular Internet advertising cooperative, similar in function to a webring, originally known as Internet Link Exchange or ILE.

== History ==
It was founded in March 1996 by 23-year-old Harvard graduates Tony Hsieh (who later went on to invest in and become the CEO of Zappos) and Sanjay Madan. Ali Partovi later joined them as a third partner in August 1996. Alfred Lin dropped out of his Stanford PhD program to join as CFO. In November 1996, when the company consisted of about 10 people, it moved from Hsieh's and Madan's living room to an office in San Francisco. In May 1997, the company received US$3 million in funding from Sequoia Capital.

In June 1998, LinkExchange acquired MerchantPlanet, an early shopping cart and credit card application. That same month it also acquired Submit It! Inc., developers of Submit It!, ClickTrade, and ListBot.

A LinkExchange in-house advertising banner, circa 1998

In November 1998, when LinkExchange had 100 employees, it was acquired by Microsoft for US$265 million.

LinkExchange stopped taking new applications on November 15, 2006. On June 4, 2007 it stopped serving banners.
