= Gabb Wireless =

American technology company

Gabb Wireless Inc.
- Type: Private
- Industry: Consumer technology; Telecommunication
- Founded: 2018
- Founder: Steve Dalby
- Headquarters: Lehi, Utah
- Website: https://gabb.com/

Gabb Wireless is a technology corporation headquartered in Lehi, Utah that makes smartphones and smartwatches for children aged 8 to 16. It was founded in 2018 by Steve Dalby.

== History ==
Gabb was founded as Tyndale Technology in 2018 by Steve Dalby, a father of eight. After he failed to find a smartphone that he felt safe giving to his 12 year old child, Dalby, a former schoolteacher, founded Tyndale. The company name was changed to Gabb Wireless later that same year.

The company was originally successful, raising funds through the growth equity funds AIM and Sandlot. However, Dalby’s relationship with the AIM and Sandlot board of directors soon went south. The directors voted to remove Dalby from his role of CEO after two years. Dalby sued, and the parties settled. Following the agreement, Dalby assumed a position on the board of directors, and, per the settlement, could not be removed from this position. Nate Randle succeeded Dalby as CEO.

Further tensions arose, however, when Dalby replaced one director with his wife Jana. Upon realizing that company funds were being used in a secret effort to remove Dalby from the company entirely, Dalby sued again. The case (Stephen Dalby, et al. v. David Kastner, et al.) went to court in 2025. It was ruled that Dalby’s removal from the position of CEO was unlawful.

Dalby has been reinstated as CEO and Randle has left the company.

== Products ==
Gabb’s smartphones have basic functions, like calling, texting, taking pictures, and playing music. They do not, however, provide access to the internet or have the ability to download social media and games. Gabb smartwatches have similar functions, as well as a step counting feature. There has been at least one reported incident, however, of a Gabb smartwatch overheating to the point of combustion.

== Gabb Music ==
Gabb Wireless also runs Gabb Music, a family friendly music streaming service available on Gabb devices, as well as on iPhones and Android smartphones. Gabb Music was named a National Parenting Product Awards winner in 2026. Top artists on Gabb Music’s song charts (as of 2026) include Josiah Queen, Alex Warren, Zara Larsson, and Benson Boone.
