= Ali Partovi =

Iranian-American entrepreneur and investor

- Born: 1972 (age 53–54); Tehran, Iran
- Education: Harvard University
- Occupations: Entrepreneur, investor
- Known for: Neo, Code.org, LinkExchange, iLike
- Children: 4
- Parent: Firouz Partovi (father)
- Relatives: Hadi Partovi (twin brother), Dara Khosrowshahi (cousin)
- Website: www.partovi.org

Ali Partovi (Persian: علی پرتووی; born 1972) is an Iranian-American entrepreneur and investor. He is the chief executive officer of Neo, a venture capital firm and mentorship community he founded in 2017. Partovi made the first investment in the AI code editor Cursor. In 2026, SpaceX acquired Anysphere, the maker of Cursor, for $60 billion in stock, one of the largest acquisitions of a venture-backed company on record. The same year, Forbes ranked him first among U.S.-based investors and second worldwide on its Midas Seed list of early-stage investors.

Before Neo, Partovi co-founded the internet advertising company LinkExchange, which Microsoft acquired in 1998, and the music service iLike, which Myspace acquired in 2009. In 2013, he and his twin brother, Hadi, co-founded Code.org, a computer science education nonprofit. He was an early investor in companies including Facebook, Dropbox, and Airbnb.

== Early life and education ==
Ali Partovi and his twin brother, Hadi, were born in Tehran in 1972. Their mother was a computer scientist who studied at Boston University, and their father, Firouz Partovi, helped found Sharif University of Technology. When they were ten, the twins began coding on a Commodore 64 their father had brought back from a seminar abroad. They grew up during the Iran–Iraq War, and the family left Iran for the United States in 1984. Both earned bachelor's and master's degrees in computer science from Harvard University, where they were members of Sigma Chi.

== Career ==
=== LinkExchange ===
Partovi co-founded the internet advertising company LinkExchange in 1996 with Tony Hsieh and Sanjay Madan. Alfred Lin later joined as CFO. Microsoft acquired the company in 1998 for $265 million. At the time, LinkExchange placed ads on about 400,000 websites and reached about 21 million consumers.

Partovi has said he was among the first to recognize the commercial potential of paid search. He noted that small business owners were eager to appear in search results. In 1998, LinkExchange acquired Submit It!, a service started by college dropout Scott Banister that helped website owners submit URLs to search engines. After the acquisition, Partovi stayed at Microsoft, where paid search launched in 2000 as an MSN Search feature called Keywords. Microsoft shut it down after a few months. However, executives at Microsoft, Yahoo, Excite, and other search companies had pinned their hopes on banner ads.

=== iLike ===
iLike, an online platform for discovering new artists, grew out of GarageBand. GarageBand was established in 1999 as a site where an independent artist could post their music, and other users would discover them. Partovi acquired the assets of GarageBand in 2002. When he and his brother attempted to re-invent the company, iLike was founded in 2006.

iLike built its application on the Facebook Platform, where it became the top music application, gathering millions of users within weeks of its debut. The application included a predecessor to the "like" button; according to The Washington Post, Facebook later built its own "like" button modeled after iLike's. The service let users make playlists and buy music downloads, merchandise, and concert tickets, and artists including U2, Beyoncé, 50 Cent, and Keith Urban used it to release music and videos directly to fans. iLike had a "post-once publish-everywhere" dashboard for artists.

iLike grew to be the largest music application across social networks, with 55 million users. According to legal filings reported by The Washington Post, Facebook executives had told Partovi to sell iLike to Facebook or be shut down; after he refused, Facebook discontinued features the app relied upon. Myspace acquired iLike in 2009 for $20 million, a price the newspaper described as "a fraction of its previous value".

=== Neo ===
From 1998 to 2017, Partovi backed technology companies including Facebook, Airbnb, Dropbox, and Zappos. In 2017, Partovi founded Neo, a venture fund that identifies top computer science students and invests in their startups. He stopped angel investing around this time. In April 2025, Neo closed a $320 million fund.

In 2023, Neo led Bluesky's $8 million seed round. Partovi made the first investment in Cursor, and Neo was a seed investor in the prediction market Kalshi. In June 2026, SpaceX agreed to acquire Anysphere, the maker of Cursor, for $60 billion in an all-stock deal. The acquisition was completed in August 2026. PitchBook ranked it as the second-largest acquisition of a venture-backed company on record, behind SpaceX's earlier merger with xAI.

In 2026, Forbes ranked Partovi first among U.S.-based investors and second worldwide on its Midas Seed list of early-stage investors, and cited his early investment in Cursor. He also ranked 67th on the magazine's main Midas List. In April 2026, The Wall Street Journal reported that Neo had turned a $150 million fund raised in 2021 into $1.2 billion, a rare result for venture funds from that year.

In October 2026, Partovi launched Confession with Ali Partovi, an interview podcast in which technology executives talk about setbacks and lessons from their careers. The first two episodes featured Microsoft CEO Satya Nadella and Uber CEO Dara Khosrowshahi.

== Philanthropy ==
Partovi's philanthropic work focuses on computer science education. He also served on the board of directors of FoodCorps, a school-food nonprofit.

=== Code.org ===
Partovi created Code.org in 2013 as a non-profit initiative to promote computer science, and the two brothers funded the initiative. Partovi believes that everyone in the world should be able to read and write code, yet many American public schools do not offer computer science classes. Code.org launched a short video featuring Mark Zuckerberg, Bill Gates, Jack Dorsey, and others to inspire kids to learn how to code. This video garnered over 15 million views on YouTube. Code.org also established Hour of Code, a tutorial that introduces students to programming.

== Personal life ==
Partovi grew up playing the piano with his brother and is an avid musician.

As an immigrant himself, he has spoken publicly about legislation affecting immigrant populations, including immigration and educational policies. In his op-ed "Immigrants are Humans," Partovi wrote that he and other immigrants had been deported as 12-year-olds and that such policies do not help anybody and hurt America.

As of 2019, Partovi has four children from two marriages. Partovi's cousins include Dara Khosrowshahi, Amir Khosrowshahi (co-founder of Nervana Systems), and Farzad "Fuzzy" Khosrowshahi (co-founder XL2Web which was acquired to become Google Sheets).
