= Tony Hsieh =

American businessman (1973–2020)

- 謝家華
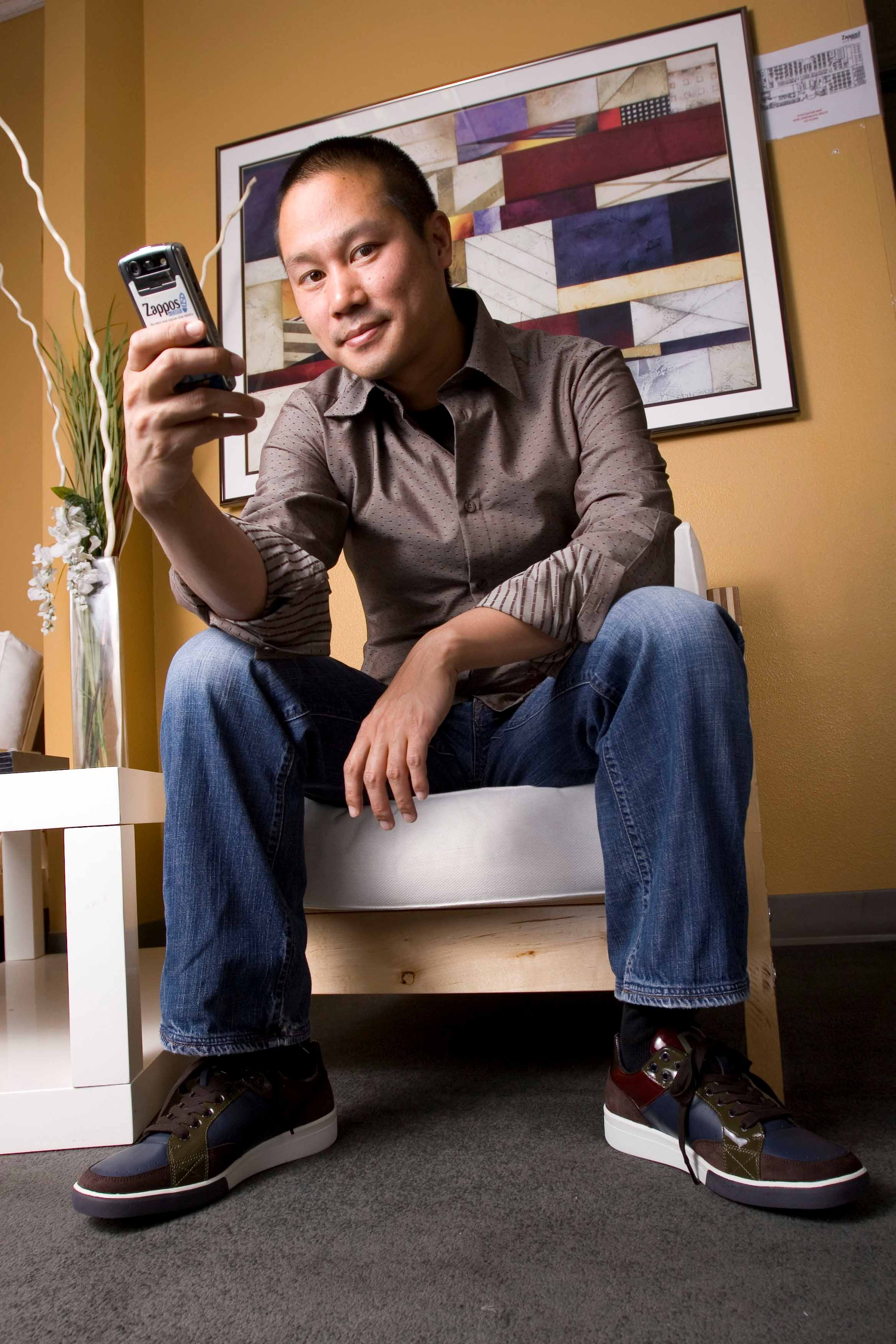
- Hsieh in 2009
- Born: December 12, 1973; Urbana, Illinois, U.S.
- Died: November 27, 2020 (aged 46); Bridgeport, Connecticut, U.S.
- Education: Harvard University (BA)
- Occupation: Businessman
- Years active: 1995–2020
- Known for: CEO of Zappos (1999–2020)

Anthony Hsieh (/ʃeɪ/ SHAY; December 12, 1973 – November 27, 2020) was an American Internet entrepreneur and venture capitalist. He retired as the CEO of the online shoe and clothing company Zappos in August 2020 after 21 years. Prior to joining Zappos, Hsieh co-founded the Internet advertising network LinkExchange, which he sold to Microsoft in 1998 for $265 million.

== Early life ==
Hsieh was born to a Taiwanese American family in Urbana, Illinois. His parents were Richard and Judy Hsieh, immigrants from Taiwan who met in graduate school at the University of Illinois. Hsieh's family moved to the Lucas Valley area of Marin County, California, when he was five. His mother was a social worker, and his father a chemical engineer at Chevron Corp. He had two younger brothers, Andy and Dave. Hsieh attended the Branson School.

In 1995, Hsieh graduated from Harvard University with a degree in computer science. While at Harvard, he managed the Quincy House grill selling pizza to the students in his dorm; his best customer, Alfred Lin, would later become Zappos's chief financial officer and chief operating officer. After college, Hsieh worked for Oracle Corporation. After five months, he left to co-found the LinkExchange advertising network.

== Career ==
=== LinkExchange ===
In 1996, Hsieh started developing the idea for an advertising network called LinkExchange with his college classmates Sanjay Madan and Ali Partovi. LinkExchange allowed members to advertise on other members' sites in exchange for placing LinkExchange banner advertisements on their own sites. They launched in March 1996, with Hsieh as CEO, and found their first 30 clients by direct emailing webmasters. The site grew, and within 90 days LinkExchange had over 20,000 participating web pages and had had its banner ads displayed over 10 million times. By 1998, the site had over 400,000 members and 5 million ads rotated daily. In November 1998, LinkExchange was sold to Microsoft for $265 million; Hsieh personally netted $40 million from the sale.

=== Venture Frogs ===
After LinkExchange sold to Microsoft, Hsieh co-founded and owned Venture Frogs, an incubator and investment firm, with his business partner, Alfred Lin. The name originated from a dare. One of Hsieh's friends said she would invest everything if they chose "Venture Frogs" as the name, and the pair took her up on the bet, although they had not seen any money as of 2011. They invested in a variety of tech and Internet startups, including Ask Jeeves, OpenTable and Zappos.

=== Zappos ===
In 1999, Nick Swinmurn approached Tony Hsieh and Alfred Lin with the idea of selling shoes online. Hsieh was initially skeptical and almost deleted Swinmurn's initial voice mail. After Swinmurn mentioned that "footwear in the US is a $40 billion market, and 5% of that was already being sold by paper mail order catalogs," Hsieh and Lin decided to invest through Venture Frogs. Two months later, Hsieh joined Zappos as the CEO, starting with $1.6 million of total sales in 2000. By 2009, revenues reached $1 billion.

Without a precedent to guide him, Hsieh learned how to make customers feel comfortable shopping for shoes online. Zappos offered free shipping and free returns, sometimes of several pairs. Hsieh rethought Zappos structure, and in 2013 it became for a time a holacracy without job titles, reflecting his belief in employees and their ability to self-organize. The company hired only about 1% of all applicants. Named for the Spanish word for 'shoes', zapatos, Zappos was often listed in Fortune as one of the best companies to work for, and beyond high salaries and being an inviting place to work it delivered extraordinary customer service.

Hsieh loved the game of poker and moved Zappos headquarters to Henderson, Nevada, and eventually to downtown Las Vegas.

On July 22, 2009, Amazon announced the acquisition of Zappos.com in a deal valued at approximately $1.2 billion. Hsieh is said to have made at least $214 million from the sale, not including money made through his former investment firm Venture Frogs.

On August 24, 2020, Hsieh retired as the CEO of Zappos after 21 years at the helm.

=== JetSuite ===
Hsieh joined JetSuite's board in 2011. He led a $7 million round of investment in the growing private "very light jet" field with that company. The investment allowed JetSuite to add two new Embraer Phenom 100 jets which have two pilots, two engines and safety features equivalent to large commercial passenger jets but weigh less than 10,000 pounds (4,500 kg) and are consequently highly fuel-efficient.

=== Real estate rejuvenation projects ===
==== Downtown Project (DTP) – Las Vegas ====
From 2009 until his death, Hsieh, who was still running the downtown Las Vegas-based Zappos.com business, organized a major re-development and revitalization project for downtown Las Vegas, which had been for the most part left behind compared to the Las Vegas Strip's growth. Hsieh originally planned the Downtown Project as a place where Zappos.com employees could live and work, but the project grew beyond that to a vision where thousands of local tech and other entrepreneurs could live and work. Projects funded include The Writer's Block, the first independent bookseller in Las Vegas and Downtown Container Park, made of shipping containers.

==== Park City, Utah ====
After stepping down as CEO of Zappos in August 2020, Hsieh bought multiple properties in Park City, Utah, with a total market value around $56 million.

== Awards ==
Hsieh was a member of the Harvard University team that won the 1993 ACM International Collegiate Programming Contest in Indianapolis, ranking first of 31 entrants.

Hsieh received an Ernst & Young Entrepreneur of the Year award for the Northern California region in 2007.

== Bibliography ==
Hsieh's 2010 book Delivering Happiness focused on his entrepreneurial endeavors. It was profiled in many world publications, including The Washington Post, CNBC, TechCrunch, The Huffington Post and The Wall Street Journal. It debuted at No. 1 on the New York Times Best Seller List and stayed on the list for 27 consecutive weeks.

== Personal life ==
Hsieh resided primarily in Downtown Las Vegas, and also owned a residence in Southern Highlands, Nevada. Hsieh was known for taking extreme challenges regarding his body, including starving himself of oxygen to induce hypoxia, using nitrous oxide, and fasting to the point where he was under 100 pounds (45 kg). Singer Jewel said that she was aware of Hsieh's extreme drug abuse and sent him a letter months before his death to warn him.

=== Death ===
On the morning of November 18, 2020, Hsieh was injured in a house fire in New London, Connecticut, although his identity was not revealed at the time. It has been reported that he was visiting family for Thanksgiving, and he either became trapped in a pool shed during the fire, or barricaded himself inside and would not answer the door. He was rescued by firefighters and transported to the Connecticut Burn Center at Bridgeport Hospital to undergo treatment for burns and smoke inhalation, where he died on November 27, at age 46. The Connecticut medical examiner determined that Hsieh died from smoke inhalation, and ruled his death accidental. News sources have suggested that his drug use and nitrous oxide use may have played a role in his death.

The Wall Street Journal reported that, according to property records, Hsieh was staying at a house that was possibly owned by a former Zappos employee, Rachael Brown.

Hsieh died unmarried, without children and without a known will. As a result his parents Richard and Judy took over his estate and his brother Andrew was appointed a co-administrator. The estate was soon badgered for money due to erratic promises Hsieh had made before he died and claims of unpaid debts. In March 2025, a will dated to 2015 arrived at a Reno law firm with a strange story and an anonymous sender. According to the cover letter, the will had been found in the home of a 91-year-old man in Pakistan named Pir Muhammad who had died of Alzheimer's. Hsieh's family has contested the validity of the will, calling it a forgery, saying that Hsieh had no connection to Pakistan, and that nobody knew a person named Pir Muhammad. Additionally, the four signed witnesses to the will have proven impossible to find, or were fictitious. Hsieh's schedule on the claimed date of the will signing was dug up, and he was scheduled to have been in Zappos-related meetings and calls the entire day. Despite this, the law firm the will was mailed to have proceeded with the case, with the family contesting the claimed will as fraudulent. Lawyers on both sides are expected to litigate the matter in court, expenses paid from the estate.
