= Nick Swinmurn =

American businessman

- Born: c. 1973; 53 years ago Swindon, United Kingdom
- Education: University of California, Santa Barbara
- Occupations: Entrepreneur, investor
- Known for: Founding of companies Zappos, Basecamp Fitness and investor in Golden State Warriors sports team

Nick Swinmurn is an American entrepreneur and investor who is best known as the founder of the online shoe store company Zappos. He started the company in 1999 and left in 2006, before it reached $1 billion sales in 2008 and was sold to Amazon. He is also an investor in a number of sports teams in the United States and Europe.

== Early life and education ==
Swinmurn was born in England and moved to the United States at the age of seven, growing up in the Bay Area of California. His father was an engineer and his mother was a teacher. He graduated from Los Altos High School and proceeded to earn a degree in Film Studies from the University of California, Santa Barbara, in 1995.

== Career ==
After college, Swinmurn initially worked in ticket sales for the San Bernardino Stampede minor-league baseball team and then for the San Diego Padres.

He then returned to northern California and worked at Autoweb.com, saying he was inspired by the 'anything is possible' attitude of the founders. He left Autoweb in 1998 and considered other options such as running a portal for students before finally deciding to start Zappos.

Swinmurn worked as a contractor for Silicon Graphics in order to raise funds for an online shoe store, initially called Shoesite.com. He started Zappos in 1999.

Swinmurn left Zappos in 2006 and started a number of companies, some successful and others not. He was the founder of Basecamp Fitness which was acquired by SE Brands in 2018. He also founded Dethrone Royalty, which is now owned by his brother Dan and caters to fans of mixed martial arts.

== Sports team ownerships ==
Swinmurn is an investor in the Golden State Warriors and Leeds United F.C. ownership groups.

He previously owned the San Jose Earthquakes affiliate Burlingame Dragons FC and was the majority investor in FC Helsingør prior to its sale to a local Danish group.
