= ILike =

iLike

- Company type: Subsidiary
- Website type: Social network service
- Founded: October 2006; 19 years ago
- Dissolved: 2012
- Headquarters: Beverly Hills, California, USA
- Owner: MySpace
- Key people: Ali Partovi, CEO and Founder; Hadi Partovi, President and Founder
- Website: www.ilike.com
- Current status: Defunct

iLike was an online service that allowed users to download and share music. Founded by brothers Ali Partovi and Hadi Partovi, the website made use of a sidebar that is used with Apple's iTunes or Microsoft's Windows Media Player. The program and sidebar are not required to use the site but allow for ease in discovering new artists. The site attracted around half a million users in the first four months after it was launched. According to the latest statements by the company, over 60 million consumers registered to use iLike either directly on iLike.com or using the apps built by iLike for third-party social networks such as Facebook. iLike also built a "post-once publish-everywhere" dashboard for artists – major label artists as well as independent artists.

In October 2007, iLike announced that it was teaming up with Billboard to create new charts that display the week's top 25 "most added" songs to personal music libraries.

On August 19, 2009, it was announced that MySpace was to acquire iLike.

As of February 7, 2012, the iLike website has been closed and instead redirects users to a special MySpace Music page which displays a banner announcing the closure.

== Funding ==
iLike received private funding from contributors including Ticketmaster, Khosla Ventures, Bob Pittman as well as various other investors.

== Facebook Application ==
iLike had a free Facebook application which allowed users to play clips of music they like on their profile, show concerts they are going to and play a music trivia quiz. The application had great success after its release, making it one of the most popular applications on the Facebook Platform. As of November 2007, iLike had more than 15 million users. With the launch of Facebook Pages, iLike created pages for bands. A similar feature was also available for the Bebo network.

In April 2009, iLike renamed this application to simply "Music" to maintain consistency with other Facebook apps.

The website and Facebook app no longer exist.

== Acquisition talks by Apple ==
In 2008, iLike's founders were in talks for Apple to acquire it. Ali Partovi, Hadi Partovi, and Nat Brown from iLike met with Steve Jobs and Eddy Cue from Apple. Jobs was impressed by the product and team, and offered to buy the company for $50 million. Ali Partovi insisted "I think ... I know we’re worth three times as much," a deception that Jobs' picked up on and caused negotiations to end. In 2009, iLike sold for a lower valuation to MySpace.
