= Zappos =

Online shoe and clothing store

Zappos.com

- Type: Subsidiary
- Industry: Retail
- Founded: July 12, 1999; 27 years ago
- Founder: Nick Swinmurn
- Headquarters: Las Vegas, Nevada, U.S.
- Key people: Kim Fleissner (CEO); Kedar Deshpande (Ex CEO); Tony Hsieh (Ex CEO); Alfred Lin (Ex Chairman, COO); Fred Mossler; Steve Hill (Ex VP of Merchandising); Arun Rajan (Ex COO & ex CTO)
- Products: Shoes, handbags, eyewear, accessories, clothing
- Revenue: US$2 billion (2015)
- Number of employees: 1,500+
- Parent: Amazon
- Website: zappos.com

Zappos.com is an American online shoe and clothing retailer based in Las Vegas, Nevada, United States. The company was founded in 1999 by Nick Swinmurn and launched under the domain name Shoesite.com. In July 2009, Amazon acquired Zappos in an all-stock deal worth around $1.2 billion at the time. Amazon purchased all of the outstanding shares and warrants from Zappos for 10 million shares of Amazon's common stock and provided $40 million in cash and restricted stock for Zappos employees.

== Company history ==
=== Inception ===
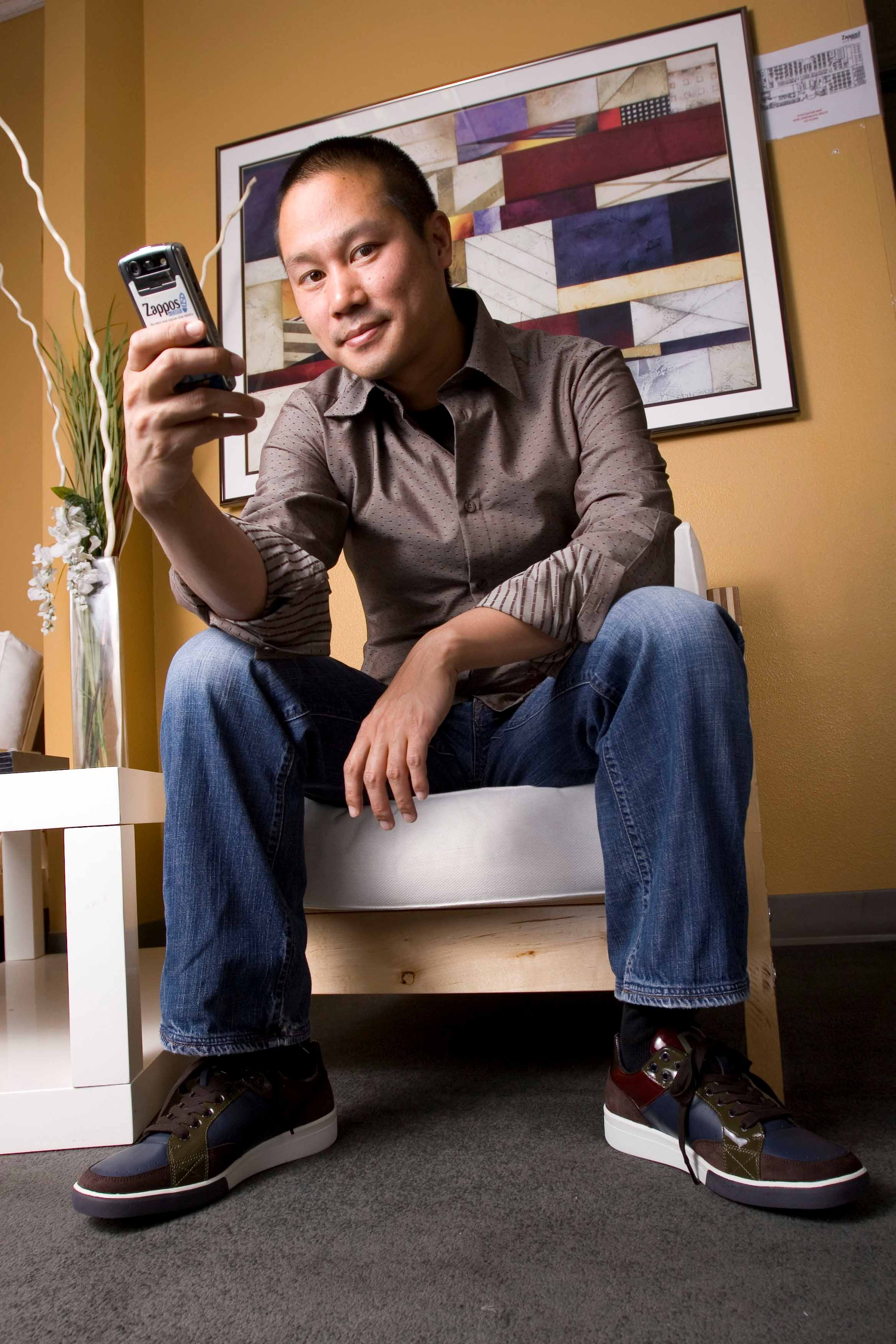
Zappos former CEO Tony Hsieh

Zappos was founded in 1999 by Nick Swinmurn. Swinmurn launched the company with Tony Hsieh and Alfred Lin, who invested $2 million through their investment firm Venture Frogs. The company was officially launched online in 1999 as ShoeSite.com.

In July 1999, the company's name was changed from ShoeSite to Zappos after "zapatos", the Spanish word meaning "shoes". In 2000, Venture Frogs invested in the business and Zappos moved into their office space. In 2001, Hsieh came on board as co-CEO with Nick Swinmurn.

=== Growth ===
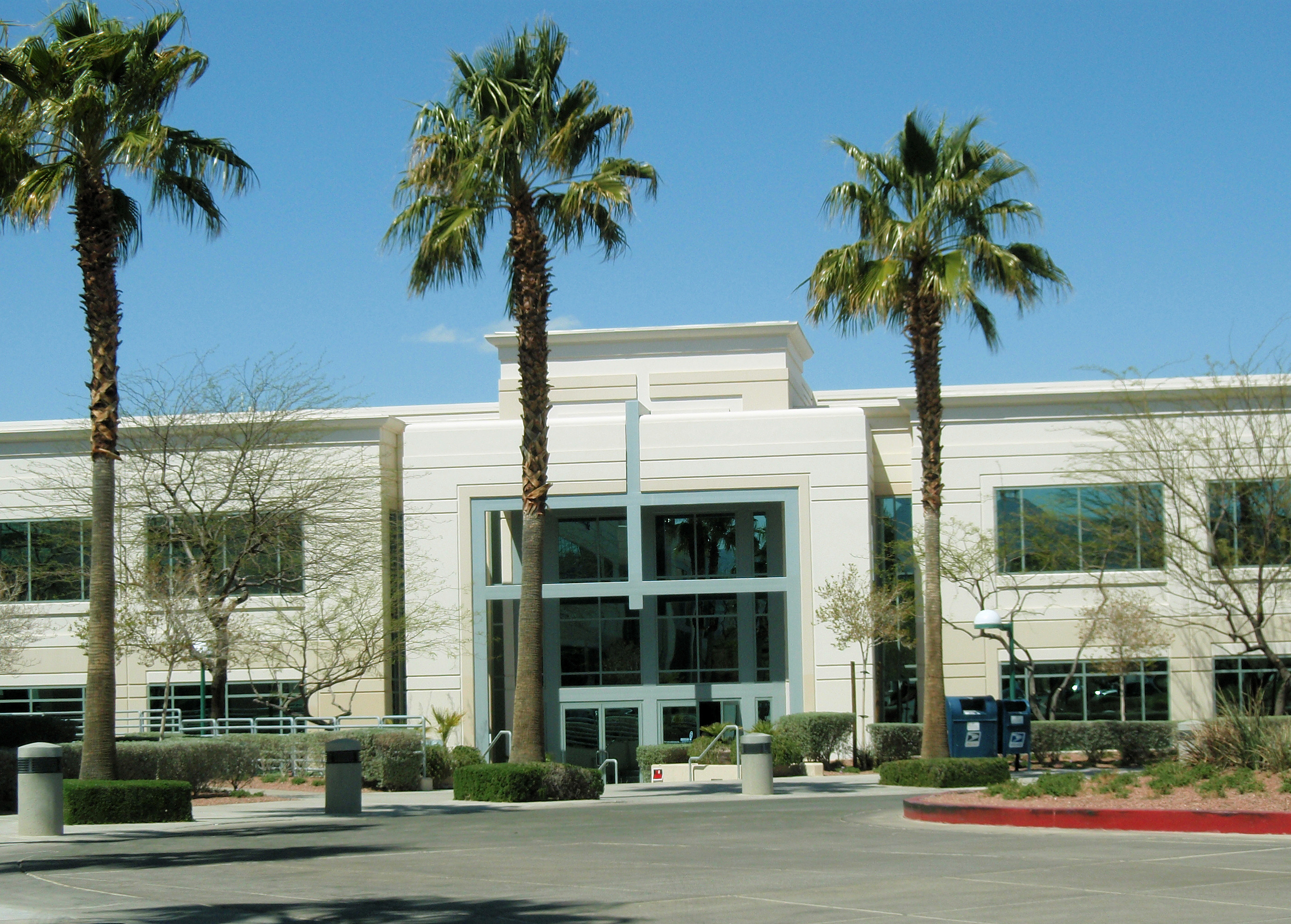
Zappos.com former headquarters in Henderson

From 1999 to 2000, Zappos earned $1.6 million in gross sales. In 2001, Zappos brought in $8.6 million, a significant increase from the previous year. In 2004, Zappos reached $184 million in gross sales and received a $35 million investment from Sequoia Capital. That same year, they moved their headquarters from San Francisco to Henderson, Nevada. Over the next three years, Zappos doubled their annual revenues, hitting $840 million in gross sales. By 2007, the company expanded to include handbags, eyewear, clothing, watches, and kids’ merchandise.

In 2008, Zappos hit $1 billion in annual sales. One year later, they debuted at No. 23 on Fortune's Top 100 Companies to Work For. In the early 2000s, Zappos made the decision to move away from its original business model wherein the company does not manage any inventory. Hsieh noted, "Even though it was hard to walk away from sales at a time when nobody is offering you money, we couldn't distinguish ourselves in the eyes of our customers if we weren't going to control the entire experience. We had to give up the easy money, manage the inventory, and take the risk." In 2015 Forbes reported Zappos produces "in excess of $2 billion in revenues annually".

=== Amazon subsidiary ===
In 2009, Zappos announced an acquisition by Amazon. Within Zappos’ board of directors, two of the five—Hsieh and Alfred Lin—were primarily concerned with maintaining Zappos company culture, whereas the other three wanted to maximize profits in the 2008 financial crisis. Initially, Hsieh and Lin planned to buy out their board of directors, which they estimated would cost $200 million. In the midst of this, Amazon executives approached Zappos with the proposition of buying the company outright. After an hour-long meeting with Amazon CEO Jeff Bezos, Hsieh sensed that Amazon would be open to letting Zappos continue to operate as an independent entity, and started negotiations.

On July 22, 2009, Amazon announced that it would buy Zappos for $940 million in a stock and cash deal. Owners of shares of Zappos were set to receive approximately 10 million Amazon.com shares, and employees would receive a separate $40 million in cash and restricted stock units. The deal was eventually closed in November 2009 for a reported $1.2 billion.

On June 22, 2012, Zappos announced it would be handing operations of its Kentucky warehouse to Amazon on September 1, 2012. The outlet housed in the Kentucky warehouse remains open, but the name was changed to 6pm Outlet.

=== 2012 hacking incident ===
On January 16, 2012, Zappos announced that its computer systems were hacked, compromising the personal information of 24 million customers. In response, the company required all of its customers to change their passwords on the site, though it noted that it was highly unlikely that password information was obtained due to encryption. This incident led to a class action suit In re Zappos.com, Inc., Customer Data Security Breach Litigation, with plaintiffs claiming that Zappos did not adequately protect their personal information. After the case was initially dismissed, plaintiffs appeal was upheld by the Ninth Circuit Court of Appeals. Zappos appealed the decision to the Supreme Court, but this was ultimately rejected. A settlement was reached in October 2019. Customers received a 10% discount on one order. Zappos denied wrongdoing, but is expected to pay $1.6 million in court costs.

=== New headquarters ===
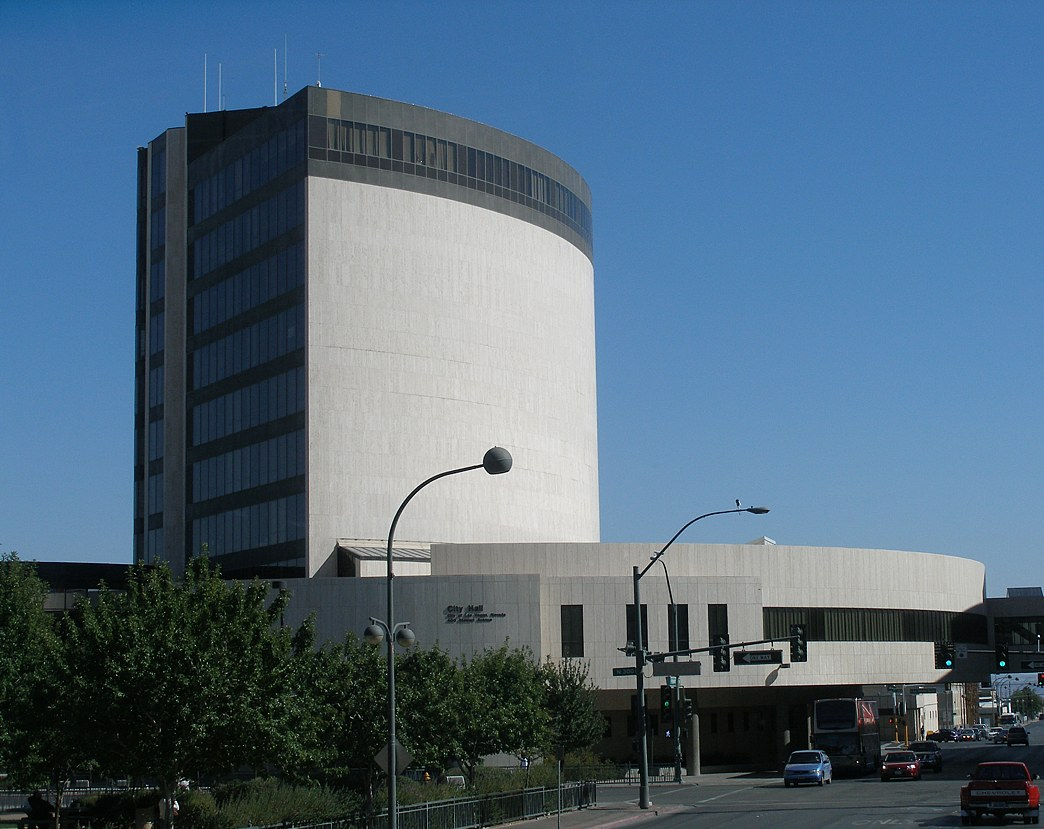
Old Las Vegas City Hall prior to renovation and becoming new headquarters

On September 9, 2013, Zappos moved their headquarters from Henderson, Nevada, to the former Las Vegas City Hall building in downtown Las Vegas. CEO Tony Hsieh, at the time stated that he wanted "to be in an area where everyone feels like they can hang out all the time and where there's not a huge distinction between working and playing." The move was lauded by Las Vegas mayor Oscar Goodman who said "This move will bring about a critical mass of creative persons to the inner core of Las Vegas in addition to causing a significant shot in the arm for the economy and for new jobs."

=== Tony Hsieh steps down as CEO ===
On August 24, 2020, Tony Hsieh retired as CEO after 21 years at the helm. COO Kedar Deshpande took over as the new CEO. On November 27, 2020, Tony Hsieh died from smoke inhalation suffered in a house fire. After Deshpande left Zappos, Scott Schaefer, the company's VP of finance, was named Zappos CEO on April 6, 2022.

== Products ==
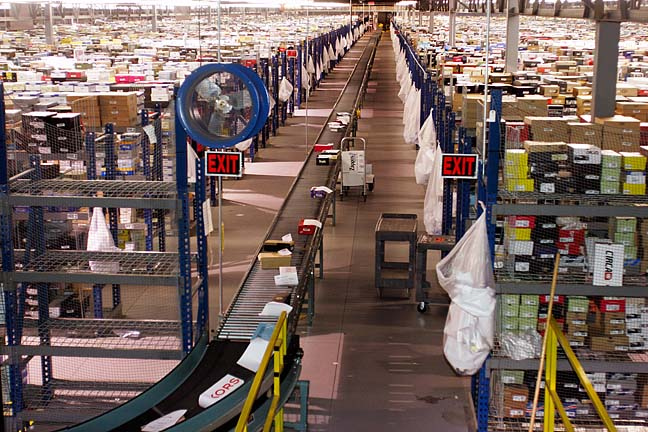
The Zappos fulfillment center in Kentucky

As of 2010, shoes accounted for about 80% of Zappos' business. As of 2007, Zappos had expanded their inventory to include clothing, handbags and other accessories, which accounted for 20% of annual revenues. Zappos executives stated that they expected that clothing and accessories would bring in an additional $1 billion worth of revenue, as the clothing market is four times the size of the footwear market.

The company sells many different types of footwear, including vegan shoes. In 2004, they launched a second line of shoes called Zappos Couture.

== Social media ==
CEO Tony Hsieh encouraged his employees to use social media networks to put a human face on the company and engage with customers, following their core value #6: "Build Open and Honest Relationships With Communication". Zappos employees maintain an active presence on:

- Twitter: Zappos runs its own Twitter microsite for its 500 employees registered on Twitter. Among them, Tony Hsieh was one of the most followed persons on Twitter with 2.75 million followers. Employees are encouraged to use their Twitter accounts for casual communication rather than promotions or marketing pitches, in an effort to humanize the company, like when Hsieh tweeted before going onstage at a tech conference: "Spilled Coke on left leg of jeans, so poured some water on right leg so looks like the denim fade."
- Instagram: Zappos has six verified Instagram accounts: one main account, one for kids, one charity account ("For Good"), one account for running, one about the company culture and one that is "Adaptive", about disability rights. In 2020, they announced on the Adaptive account that they would be selling single shoes after public pressure from disability activist groups.
- Corporate blogs: Zappos runs several blogs covering topics related to its business.

== Corporate programs and sponsorships ==
In 2008, Zappos launched Zappos Insights, a video subscription service aimed at Fortune 1 million companies that are looking to improve their company operations and customer service. The service allows participants to ask questions to and receive answers from Zappos employees. Zappos Insights also offers a three-day bootcamp where participants visit the headquarters and have meetings with Zappos executives. In 2007, Zappos acquired 6pm.com from eBags. The site sells shoes and accessories. Zappos sponsors the "Zappos Rock 'n' Roll Las Vegas Marathon and ½ Marathon", which draw 28,000 runners each year. They also sponsor the Zappos WCC basketball championships. During the tournament, Zappos hosts "Kidz Day", which outfits local Las Vegas kids with a new pair of shoes and an event T-shirt.

== Recognition ==
Zappos was ranked 23rd on the Fortune magazine's list of "100 Best Companies to Work For" in 2009, 15th in 2010, sixth in 2011, dropping slightly to 11th in 2012.

== See also ==
- MatchesFashion.com
- Overstock.com
- Asos
- Farfetch
